= Jon Bon Jovi discography =

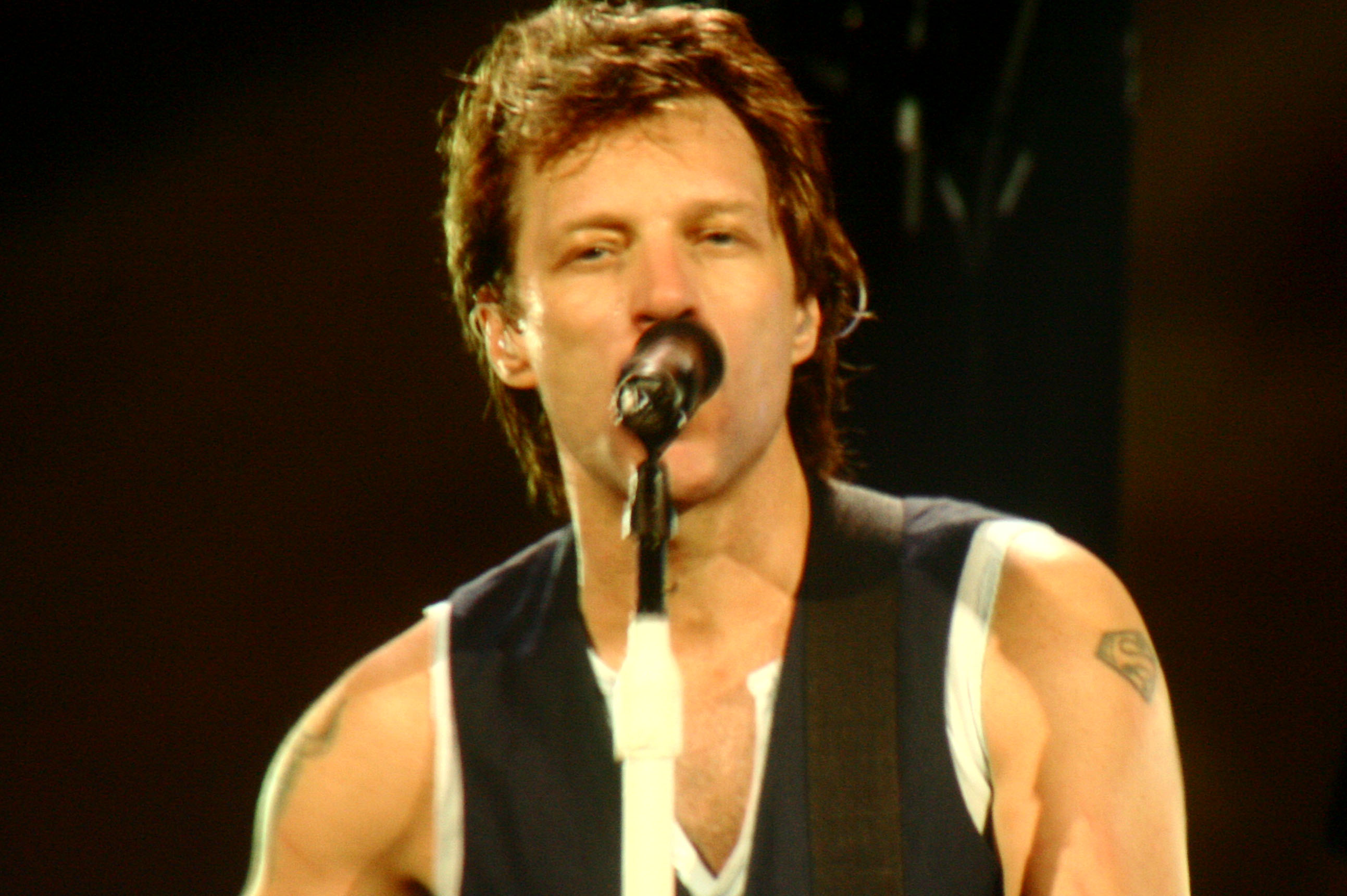
- Studio albums: 2
- Live albums: 1
- Compilation albums: 2
- Singles: 17
- Music videos: 12

The discography of American singer Jon Bon Jovi includes two released studio albums, one live album, two compilations and sixteen singles.

== Albums ==
=== Studio albums ===
Title	Album details	Peak chart positions										Certifications (sales threshold)
Title	Album details	US	AUS	AUT	CAN	FIN	GER	NZ	SWE	SWI	UK	Certifications (sales threshold)
Blaze of Glory	Released: July 26, 1990; Label: Mercury	3	2	1	1	3	4	3	1	4	2	RIAA: 2× Platinum; ARIA: Platinum; BPI: Gold; CAN: 2× Platinum
Destination Anywhere	Released: June 17, 1997; Label: Mercury	31	4	1	6	2	1	34	7	1	2	BPI: Gold; MC: Platinum

=== Live albums ===
Title	Album details
At the Starland Ballroom Live	Released: 2009; Label: BackstageJBJ.com

=== Compilation albums ===
Title	Album details
John Bongiovi: The Power Station Years	Released: 1998
The Power Station Years: The Unreleased Recordings	Released: September 18, 2001; Label: Mercury

== Singles ==
Title	Year	Peak chart positions										Certifications	Album
Title	Year	US	US Rock	AUS	FIN	GER	IRE	NLD	SWE	SWI	UK	Certifications	Album
"Blaze of Glory"	1990	1	1	1	2	16	3	16	3	5	13	RIAA: Platinum; ARIA: Platinum; BPI: Silver; NZ: Platinum	Blaze of Glory
"Miracle"	1990	12	20	8	20	47	20	65	15	20	29	ARIA: Gold	Blaze of Glory
"Never Say Die"	1991	—	—	60	—	—	—	—	—	—	—		Blaze of Glory
"Dyin' Ain't Much of a Livin'" (with Elton John)	1991	—	—	—	—	—	—	—	—	—	—		Blaze of Glory
"Santa Fe" (Promo)	1991	—	—	—	—	—	—	—	—	—	—		Blaze of Glory
"Levon"	1992	*	27	—	—	—	—	—	—	—	—		Two Rooms
"Please Come Home for Christmas"	1994	—	—	—	20 ^{+}	—	6 ^{+}	—	—	—	7 ^{+}	BPI: Silver	A Very Special Christmas 2
"Midnight in Chelsea"	1997	*	—	17	2	9	13	16	49	5	4		Destination Anywhere
"Queen of New Orleans"	1997	—	—	40	—	66	27	40	41	50	10		Destination Anywhere
"Janie, Don't Take Your Love to Town"	1997	*	—	—	—	38	—	61	—	40	13		Destination Anywhere
"Ugly"	1998	—	—	—	—	75	—	—	—	41	—		Destination Anywhere
"Staring at Your Window with a Suitcase in My Hand" (Promo)	1998	—	—	—	—	—	—	—	—	—	—		Destination Anywhere
"More Than We Bargained For" (Promo)	1998	—	—	—	—	—	—	—	—	—	—		The Power Station Years
"It's Only Rock 'n Roll (But I Like It)" (as part of Artists for Children's Promise)	1999	—	—	—	—	—	—	55	—	95	19		Charity single
"Everybody Hurts" (as part of Helping Haiti)	2010	—	—	28	—	16	1	—	25	16	1		Charity single
"Not Running Anymore"	2012	—	—	—	—	—	—	—	—	—	—		Stand Up Guys
"Love Song to the Earth" (as part of Global Warming Awareness)	2015	—	—	—	—	—	—	—	—	—	—		Charity single
"Beautiful Day"	2015	—	—	—	—	—	—	—	—	—	—		Finding Neverland
* Airplay/Radio & Records Chart, "—" denotes the single failed to chart or not released

- ^{+} "Please Come Home for Christmas" was originally credited as a solo recording by Jon Bon Jovi when included on the Christmas compilation A Very Special Christmas 2 in 1992, but when released as a single in UK, Ireland and Europe in 1994, it was released as a Bon Jovi single under the band name. The cover artwork of the single was a still from the music video of Jon Bon Jovi and Cindy Crawford and the same Bon Jovi logo as was used on the albums Keep the Faith and Cross Road and the singles taken from them.

=== Guest singles ===
Year	Single	Artist	US Country	Album
1998	"Bang a Drum"	Chris LeDoux	68	One Road Man

In 1980 Jon Bon Jovi made his recording debut singing on a 'Star Wars' themed Christmas album. Along with a number of other children, he featured on the track 'R2-D2, We Wish You a Merry Christmas'. RSO Records went out of business on the eve of the album's release so its run was limited to its initial 150,000 copy pressing.

== Music videos ==
Year	Song
1990	"Blaze of Glory"
1990	"Miracle"
1991	"Dyin' Ain't Much of a Livin'"
1994	"Please Come Home for Christmas"
1997	"Midnight in Chelsea"
1997	"Queen of New Orleans"
1997	"Janie, Don't Take Your Love to Town"
1997	"Ugly"
1998	"Staring at Your Window with a Suitcase in My Hand"
1998	"It's Just Me"
1998	"Bang a Drum"
2012	"Not Running Anymore"
