= Mark Pellington =

American film director, writer, and producer

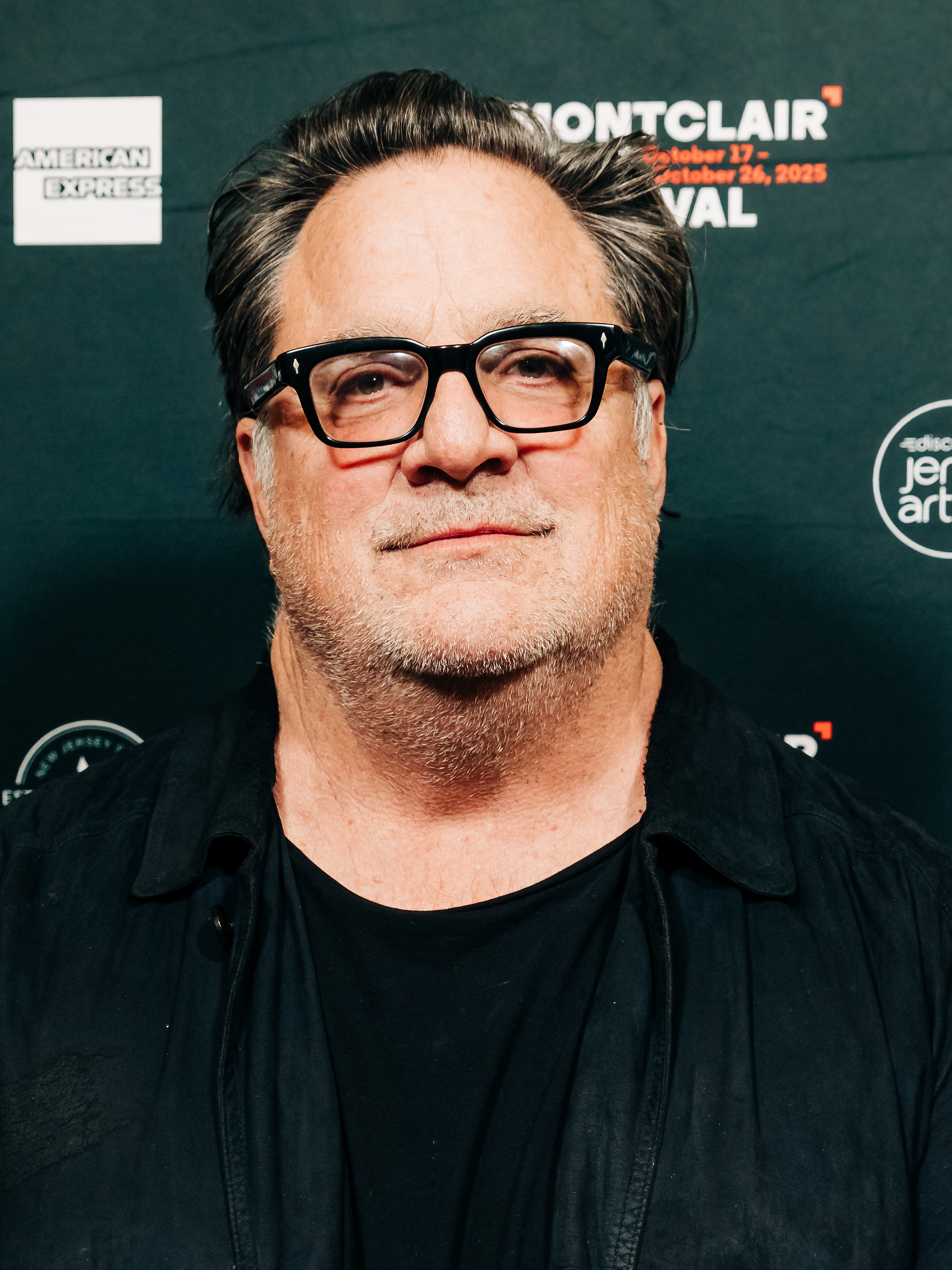
- Pellington in 2025
- Born: March 17, 1962 (age 64); Baltimore, Maryland, U.S.
- Occupations: Film director, producer, writer, photographer
- Years active: 1990–present
- Website: markpellington.com

Mark Pellington (born March 17, 1962) is an American film director, writer, and producer.

== Early life ==
Pellington was born in Baltimore, Maryland, the son of Bill Pellington, an All-Pro linebacker who played football with the Baltimore Colts for 12 seasons. He graduated from the University of Virginia in 1984.

== Career ==
Pellington started out working at MTV and directing music videos, for bands including U2, Pearl Jam, and Public Enemy. He then began directing feature films, including Going All the Way (1997), starring Ben Affleck and Rachel Weisz, Arlington Road (1999), starring Tim Robbins and Jeff Bridges, as well as The Mothman Prophecies (2002), starring Richard Gere dealing with mysterious deaths foretold by a strange red-eyed flying creature, Mothman.

== Personal life ==
In 2004, Pellington's wife, Jennifer Barrett-Pellington, died of complications from a ruptured colon. They have one daughter.

== Filmography ==
=== Director ===
==== Feature films ====
Year	Title	Awards and nominations	Ref.
1997	Going All the Way	Nominated – Sundance Film Festival Grand Jury Prize	
1999	Arlington Road	Nominated – Grand Prix Award at the Paris Film Festival; Nominated – Saturn Award for Best Action/Adventure/Thriller Film	
2002	The Mothman Prophecies		
2007	U2 3D		
2008	Henry Poole Is Here		
2011	I Melt with You		
2017	The Last Word		
2018	Nostalgia		
2022	The Severing		
TBA	Lone Wolf		

==== Short films & documentaries ====
Year	Title	Notes
1992	U2: Achtung Baby: the Videos, the Cameos and a Whole Lot of Interference from ZOO-TV	
1995	United States of Poetry	PBS documentary mini-series
1997	Destination Anywhere	Bon Jovi short film
1998	Pearl Jam: Single Video Theory	
1999	Alice in Chains: Music Bank: The Videos	
1999	Of Time and Memory	
2002	The Place We Call Earth	
2003	Day by Day: A Director's Journey Part 1 & 2	
2004	I'm Only Looking – The Best of INXS	
2005	The Flaming Lips: VOID (Video Overview in Deceleration)	
2005	Keane: Strangers	Video: "Everybody's Changing" (U.S. version)
2014	Lone	Featuring Chelsea Wolfe
2017	"Soul of the Machine"	Aston Martin promo, featuring Tom Brady
2018	"Mirror/Shadow" documentary	
2020	Nightwalkers	

==== Television ====
Year	Title	Notes
1990	Buzz	
1990	Red Hot + Blue	ABC TV special (The Jungle Brothers: "I Get a Kick Out of You")
1991	Alive from Off Center	1 episode - "Words in Your Face"
1992	Punch and Judy Get Divorced	
1997	Homicide: Life on the Street	1 episode – "Blood Ties: Part 3"
2003–2007	Cold Case	7 episodes
2009	Back	
2013	Secret Lives of Husbands and Wives	
2013	Anatomy of Violence	
2013	Red Widow	1 episode – "Pilot"
2014	Cocaine Cowboys	1 episode – "Pilot"
2015	Blindspot	4 episodes
2018	The Enemy Within	1 episode - "Pilot"
2019	Star Trek: Short Treks	2 episodes
2020	Survive	

==== Music videos ====
Year	Song	Artist	Ref
1985	"Dance Me to the End of Love"	Leonard Cohen	
1986	"Stay Right Here"	Deep 6	
1987	"Silent Morning"	Noel	
1988	"What's on Your Mind (Pure Energy)"	Information Society	
1988	"Walking Away"	Information Society	
1989	"Say No Go"	De La Soul	
1989	"Repetition"	Information Society	
1990	"Stone Cold Yesterday"	The Connells	
1990	"Love & Tears"	Maggie's Dream	
1990	"Pretty White"	Deep 6	
1991	"Gypsy Woman (She's Homeless)"	Crystal Waters	
1991	"Swing It"	J.T.	
1991	"Set Adrift on Memory Bliss"	P.M. Dawn	
1992	"One"	U2	
1992	"Reality Used to Be a Friend of Mine"	P.M. Dawn	
1992	"Television, the Drug of the Nation"	The Disposable Heroes of Hiphoprisy	
1992	"Jeremy"	Pearl Jam	
1992	"Shut 'Em Down"	Public Enemy	
1992	"Drive"	R.E.M.	
1992	"Peace and Love Inc."	Information Society	
1993	"Beautiful Girl"	INXS	
1993	"Independent"	Sacred Reich	
1993	"Rooster"	Alice in Chains	
1993	"Black Lodge"	Anthrax	
1993	"Butterfly"	Screaming Trees	
1994	"'74–'75"	The Connells	
1994	"Hobo Humpin' Slobo Babe"	Whale	
1994	"Hey Baby"	Maggie Estep & I Love Everybody	
1994	"Trigger Inside"	Therapy?	
1995	"Waydown"	Catherine Wheel	
1995	"Tomorrow"	Silverchair	
1995	"Kickin'"	Whale	
1996	"Ladykillers"	Lush	
1996	"Low"	Sacred Reich	
1996	"Beautiful Girl"	Pete Droge & the Sinners	
1997	"Midnight in Chelsea"	Jon Bon Jovi	
1997	"Queen of New Orleans"	Jon Bon Jovi	
1997	"Janie, Don't Take Your Love to Town"	Jon Bon Jovi	
1997	"Staring at Your Window with a Suitcase in My Hand"	Jon Bon Jovi	
1998	"Ugly"	Jon Bon Jovi	
1999	"We're in This Together"	Nine Inch Nails	
2002	"Lonesome Day"	Bruce Springsteen	
2002	"Do You Realize??" (UK version)	The Flaming Lips	
2002	"Half Light"	Low featuring Tomandandy	
2003	"Wasted Time"	Kings of Leon	
2004	"Gravedigger"	Dave Matthews	
2004	"She Has No Time"	Keane	
2005	"Everybody's Changing"	Keane	
2005	"Best of You"	Foo Fighters	
2006	"How to Save a Life"	The Fray	
2006	"Falling by the Wayside"	People in Planes	
2007	"Soulmate"	Natasha Bedingfield	
2008	"Girls in Their Summer Clothes (Winter Mix)"	Bruce Springsteen	
2008	"Henry Poole Is Here"	Ron Irizarry	
2008	"We're Not Beautiful"	Emma Ejwertz	
2009	"One Time We Lived" (version 2)	Moby	
2010	"Syndicate"	The Fray	
2010	"New Morning"	Alpha Rev	
2010	"Laredo"	Band of Horses	
2010	"Infinite Arms"	Band of Horses	
2010	"Hold My Hand"	Michael Jackson	
2010	"Spanking Machines"	Permission	
2011	"Care"	Kid Rock	
2011	"Skyscraper"	Demi Lovato	
2012	"I Won't Give Up"	Jason Mraz	
2014	"Final Masquerade"	Linkin Park	
2014	"Cigarette Daydreams"	Cage the Elephant	
2014	"Cool Kids"	Echosmith	
2014	"Giants"	Bear Hands	
2014	"Feral Love"	Chelsea Wolfe	
2014	"The Waves Have Come"	Chelsea Wolfe	
2014	"Let the Fireflies Fly Away"	Mark Mulcahy	
2014	"Young Blood"	Bea Miller	
2014	"Why Not Me"	The Indecent	
2015	"Human Race"	Three Days Grace	
2015	"Where's the Indifference Now?"	Mark Mulcahy	
2015	"Nightlight"	Silversun Pickups	
2016	"Dynasty"	MIIA	
2016	"Lost Boy"	Ruth B	
2017	"Gold"	The Shelters	
2017	"Tell Me You Love Me"	Demi Lovato	
2018	"Fly"	Low	
2018	"Next to Me"	Imagine Dragons	
2018	"Autumn Leaves"	Damian Marley	
2019	"You're Somebody Else"	Flora Cash	

=== Producer ===
==== Feature films ====
Year	Title	Role	Ref.
2000	No Maps for These Territories	Executive Producer	
2002	OT: Our Town	Executive Producer	
2003	Day by Day: A Director's Journey Part I	Producer	
2003	Day by Day: A Director's Journey Part II	Producer	
2004	Time Well Spent	Executive Producer	
2003–2007	Cold Case	Consulting Producer (77 episodes)	
2007	The Man from Earth	Executive Producer	
2008	Henry Poole Is Here	Executive Producer	
2009	Shipping and Receiving (short)	Executive Producer	
2011	I Melt with You	Producer	
2017	The Last Word	Producer	
2018	Nostalgia	Producer	
2022	The Severing	Producer	
