= List of UK Rock & Metal Singles Chart number ones of 1997 =

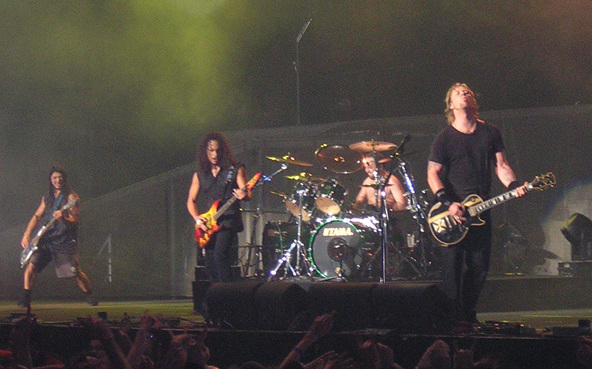
"The Memory Remains" by Metallica was the longest-running number one of 1997, spending six weeks atop the chart.

The UK Rock & Metal Singles Chart is a record chart which ranks the best-selling rock and heavy metal songs in the United Kingdom. Compiled and published by the Official Charts Company, the data is based on each track's weekly physical sales, digital downloads and streams. In 1997, there were 21 singles that topped the 52 published charts. The first number-one single of the year was "In the Meantime", the debut single by alternative rock band Spacehog, which spent the first three weeks of the year at number one. The final number-one single of the year was "The Memory Remains" by American heavy metal band Metallica.

The most successful song on the UK Rock & Metal Singles Chart in 1997 was "The Memory Remains" by Metallica, which spent the last six weeks of the year at number one. Reef's "Come Back Brighter" was number one for five weeks, while the band also spent two weeks atop the chart with "Yer Old". Green Day's "Hitchin' a Ride" also spent five weeks at number one, while Jon Bon Jovi was number one for five weeks with "Midnight in Chelsea" (three weeks) and "Queen of New Orleans" (two weeks). Marilyn Manson's "Tourniquet" spent three weeks at number one and one week with "The Beautiful People", while "In the Meantime" by Spacehog, "Song 2" by Blur and "Monkey Wrench" by Foo Fighters were all number one for three weeks. Five singles – "Swallowed" by Bush, "Falling in Love (Is Hard on the Knees)" by Aerosmith, "Freak" by Silverchair, "Afraid" by Mötley Crüe and "Anthem" by The Wildhearts – spent two weeks each at number one on the chart during 1997.

== Chart history ==
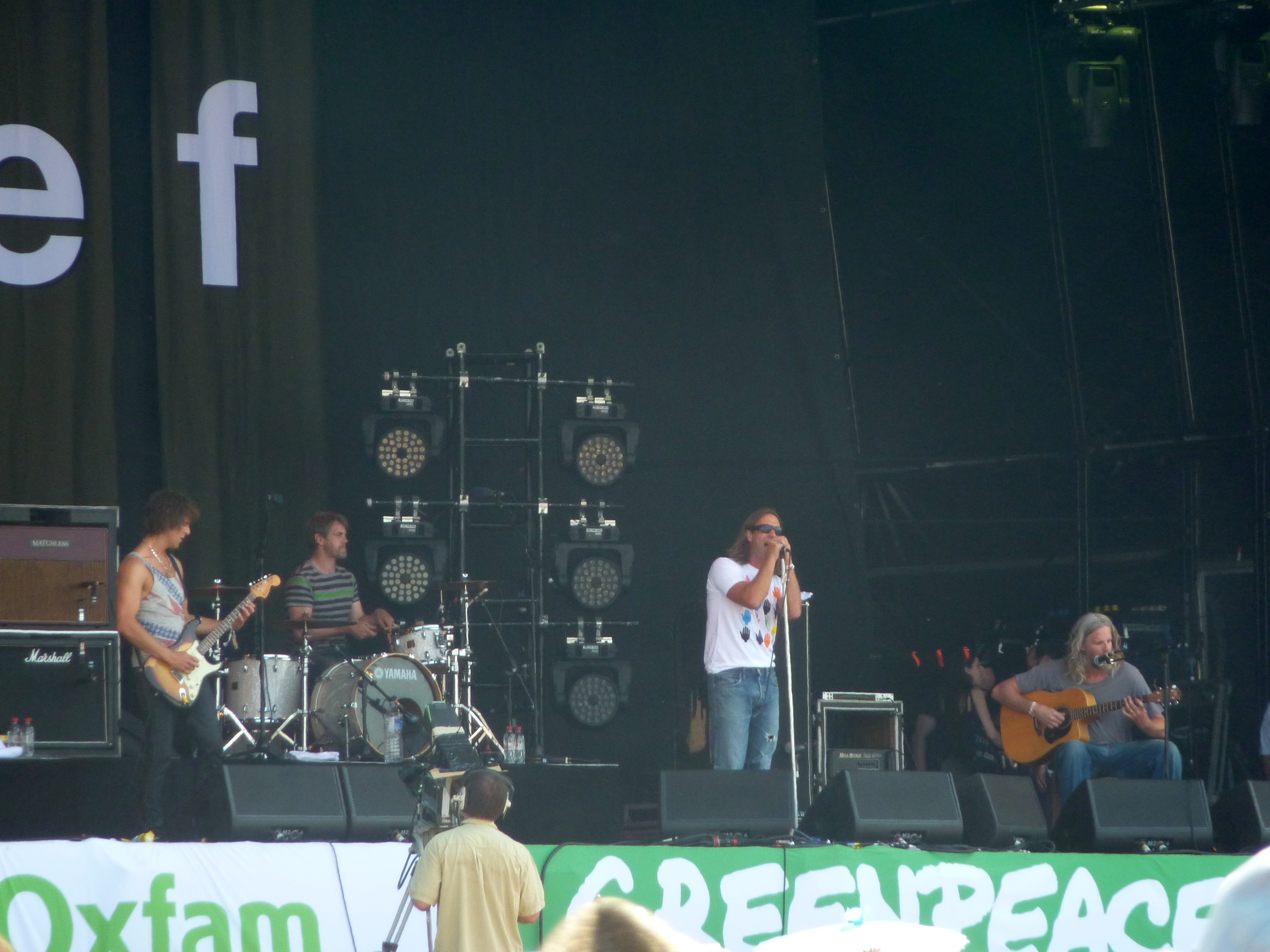
Reef spent five consecutive weeks at number one with "Come Back Brighter" and two weeks with "Yer Old".

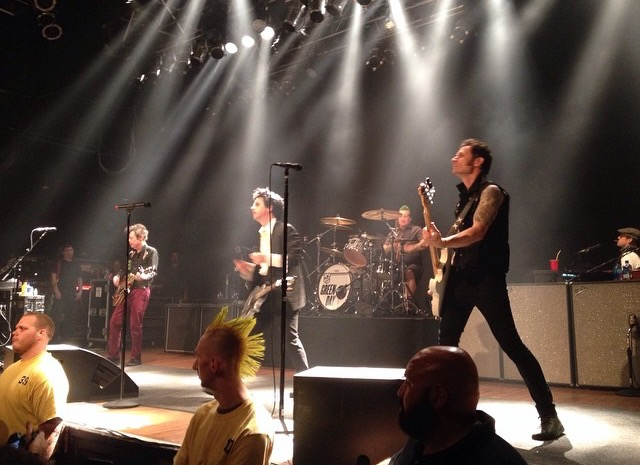
Green Day spent five weeks in 1997 at number one with "Hitchin' a Ride".

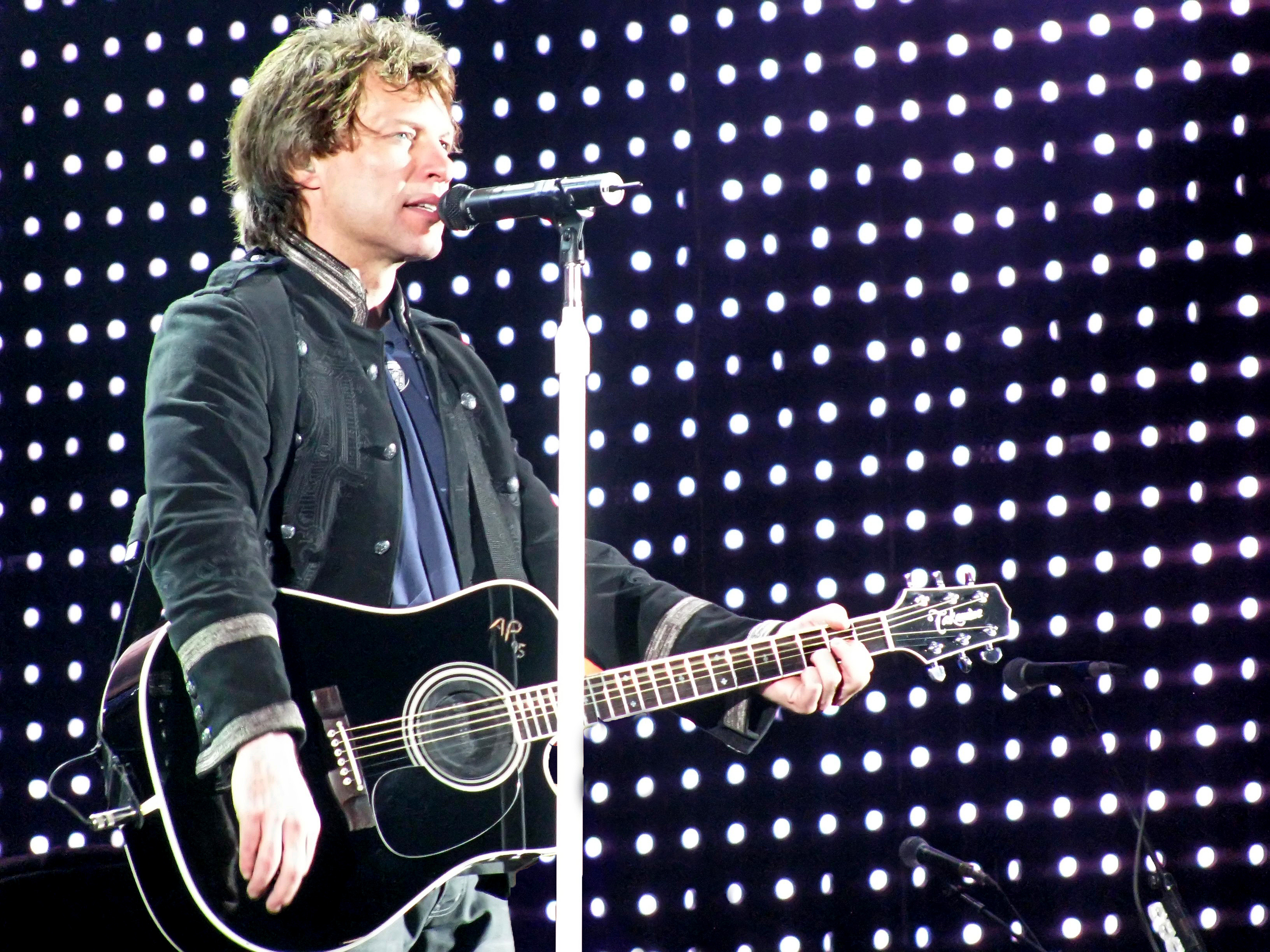
Jon Bon Jovi topped the chart for three weeks with "Midnight in Chelsea" and two weeks with "Queen of New Orleans".

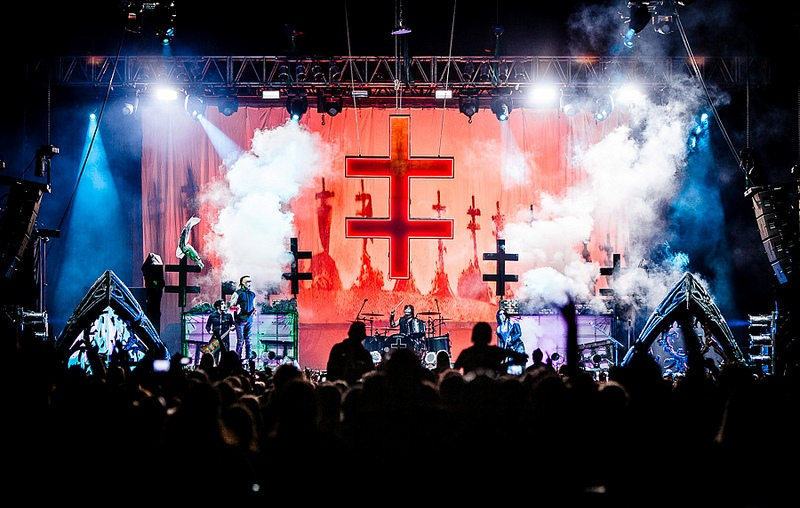
Marilyn Manson was number one for three weeks with "Tourniquet" and one week with "The Beautiful People".

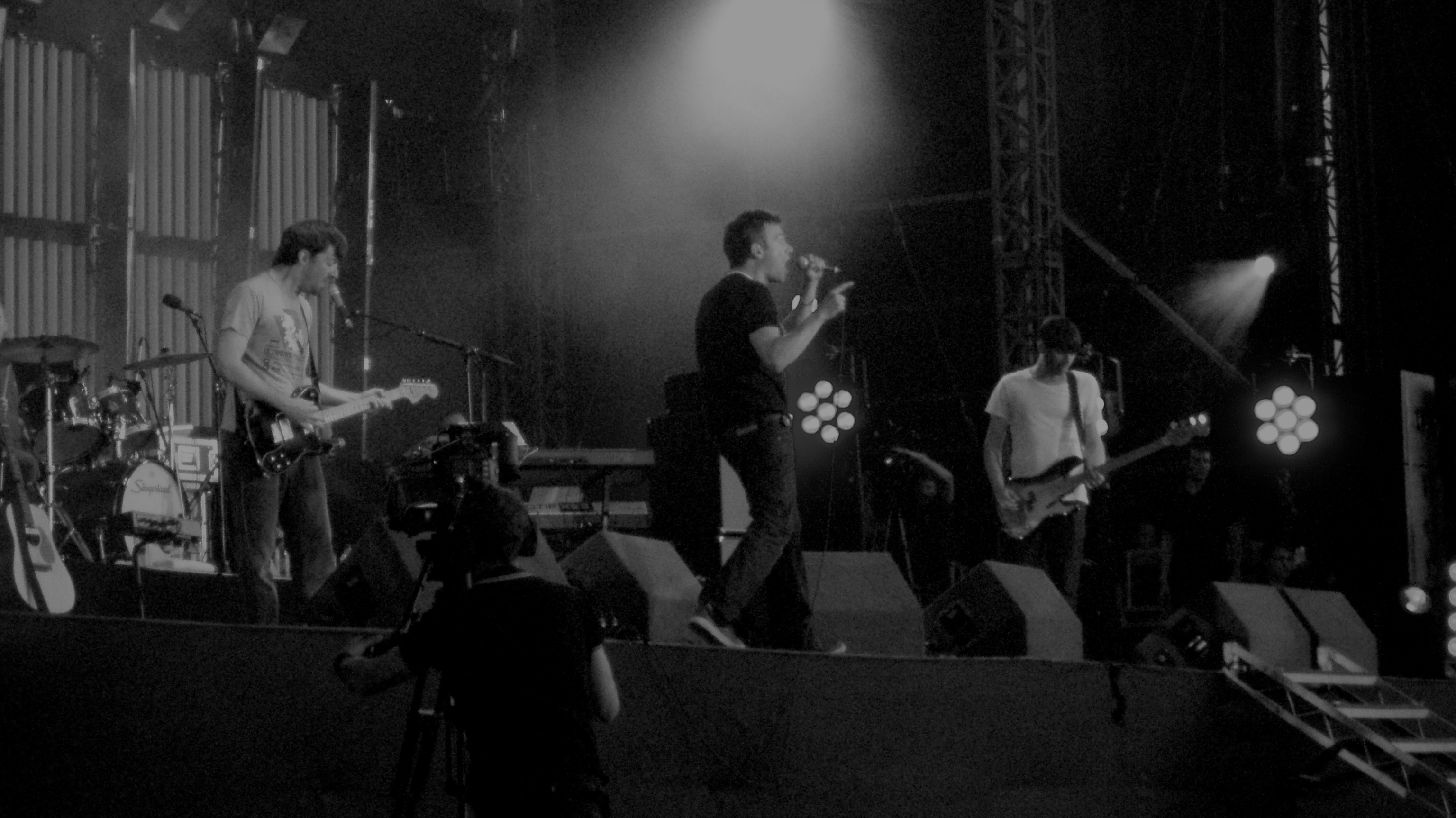
Blur's "Song 2" spent three weeks at number one on the chart.

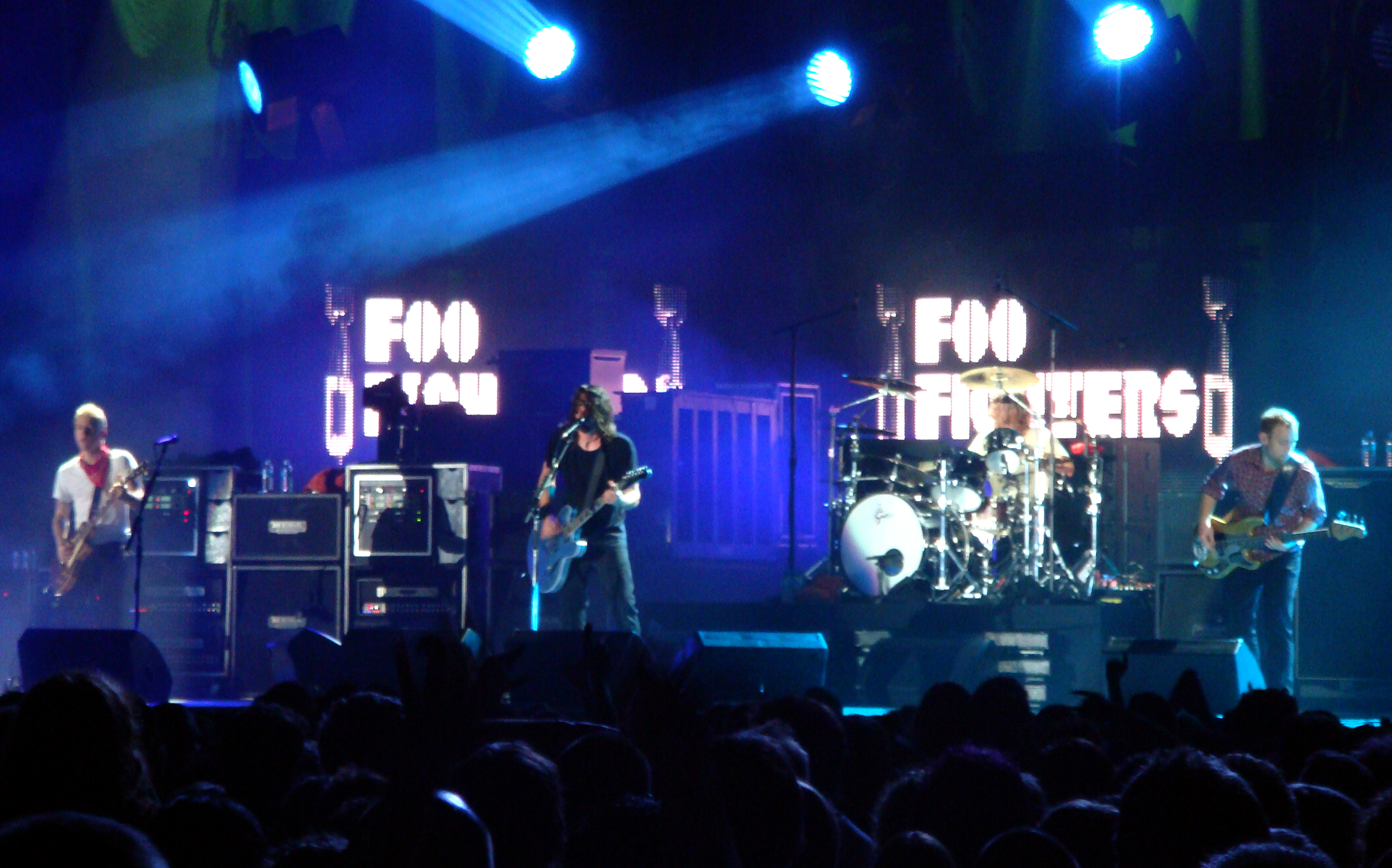
"Monkey Wrench" by Foo Fighters was number one for three weeks in 1997.

Issue date	Single	Artist(s)	Record label(s)	Ref.
4 January	"In the Meantime"	Spacehog	Elektra	
11 January	"In the Meantime"	Spacehog	Elektra	
18 January	"In the Meantime"	Spacehog	Elektra	
25 January	"Come Back Brighter"	Reef	S2	
1 February	"Come Back Brighter"	Reef	S2	
8 February	"Come Back Brighter"	Reef	S2	
15 February	"Come Back Brighter"	Reef	S2	
22 February	"Come Back Brighter"	Reef	S2	
1 March	"Swallowed"	Bush	Interscope	
8 March	"Swallowed"	Bush	Interscope	
15 March	"Lakini's Juice"	Live	Radioactive	
22 March	"Falling in Love (Is Hard on the Knees)"	Aerosmith	Columbia	
29 March	"Falling in Love (Is Hard on the Knees)"	Aerosmith	Columbia	
5 April	"Freak"	Silverchair	Murmur	
12 April	"Freak"	Silverchair	Murmur	
19 April	"Song 2"	Blur	Food	
26 April	"Song 2"	Blur	Food	
3 May	"Song 2"	Blur	Food	
10 May	"Monkey Wrench"	Foo Fighters	Roswell	
17 May	"Monkey Wrench"	Foo Fighters	Roswell	
24 May	"Monkey Wrench"	Foo Fighters	Roswell	
31 May	"Ashes to Ashes"	Faith No More	Slash	
7 June	"The Beautiful People"	Marilyn Manson	Interscope	
14 June	"Midnight in Chelsea"	Jon Bon Jovi	Mercury	
21 June	"Midnight in Chelsea"	Jon Bon Jovi	Mercury	
28 June	"All I Want to Do Is Rock"	Travis	Independiente	
5 July	"Midnight in Chelsea"	Jon Bon Jovi	Mercury	
12 July	"The End Is the Beginning Is the End"	The Smashing Pumpkins	Warner Bros.	
19 July	"Afraid"	Mötley Crüe	Elektra	
26 July	"Afraid"	Mötley Crüe	Elektra	
2 August	"Yer Old"	Reef	S2	
9 August	"Yer Old"	Reef	S2	
16 August	"Anthem"	The Wildhearts	Mushroom	
23 August	"Anthem"	The Wildhearts	Mushroom	
30 August	"Queen of New Orleans"	Jon Bon Jovi	Mercury	
6 September	"Queen of New Orleans"	Jon Bon Jovi	Mercury	
13 September	"Whole Lotta Love"	Led Zeppelin	Atlantic	
20 September	"Tourniquet"	Marilyn Manson	Interscope	
27 September	"Tourniquet"	Marilyn Manson	Interscope	
4 October	"Tourniquet"	Marilyn Manson	Interscope	
11 October	"Hitchin' a Ride"	Green Day	Reprise	
18 October	"Hitchin' a Ride"	Green Day	Reprise	
25 October	"Hitchin' a Ride"	Green Day	Reprise	
1 November	"Hitchin' a Ride"	Green Day	Reprise	
8 November	"Hitchin' a Ride"	Green Day	Reprise	
15 November	"Simple Sincerity"	Radish	Mercury	
22 November	"The Memory Remains"	Metallica	Vertigo	
29 November	"The Memory Remains"	Metallica	Vertigo	
6 December	"The Memory Remains"	Metallica	Vertigo	
13 December	"The Memory Remains"	Metallica	Vertigo	
20 December	"The Memory Remains"	Metallica	Vertigo	
27 December	"The Memory Remains"	Metallica	Vertigo	

== See also ==
- 1997 in British music
- List of UK Rock & Metal Albums Chart number ones of 1997
