= List of UK Rock & Metal Albums Chart number ones of 1997 =

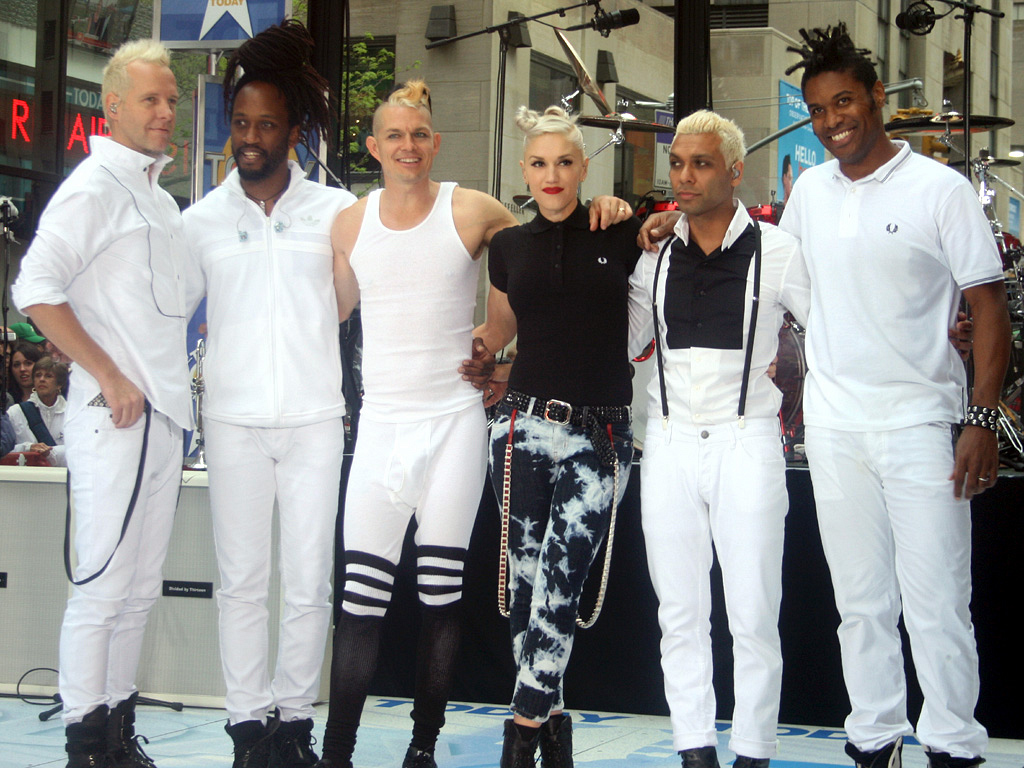
Tragic Kingdom by No Doubt was the longest-running UK Rock & Metal Albums Chart number-one album of 1997, spending 13 weeks atop the chart.

The UK Rock & Metal Albums Chart is a record chart which ranks the best-selling rock and heavy metal albums in the United Kingdom. Compiled and published by the Official Charts Company, the data is based on each album's weekly physical sales, digital downloads and streams. In 1997, there were 17 albums that topped the 52 published charts. The first number-one album of the year was the self-titled debut album by Garbage, which spent the first three weeks of the year atop the chart. The final number-one album of the year was the Queen compilation album Queen Rocks, which spent the last four weeks of the year (and the first one of 1998) at number one.

The most successful album on the UK Rock & Metal Albums Chart in 1997 was No Doubt's third studio album Tragic Kingdom, which spent a total of 13 weeks at number one over four different spells. It was also the best-selling rock album of the year, ranking 26th in the UK End of Year Albums Chart. Led Zeppelin spent eight weeks at number one in 1997 – seven with Remasters and one with BBC Sessions – Queen's Queen Rocks was number one for six weeks, and Skunk Anansie's Stoosh topped the chart for five weeks. Three albums – Garbage's self-titled debut album, Glow by Reef and The Colour and the Shape by Foo Fighters – were number one for three weeks each, while two albums – Jon Bon Jovi's second solo album Destination Anywhere and Green Day's fifth studio album Nimrod – both spent two weeks at number one during the year.

== Chart history ==
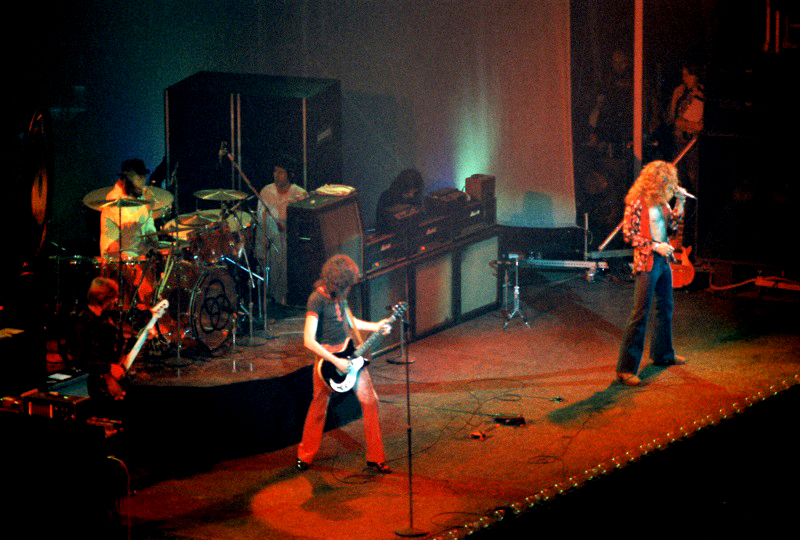
Led Zeppelin spent a total of eight weeks at number one in 1997 with Remasters and BBC Sessions.

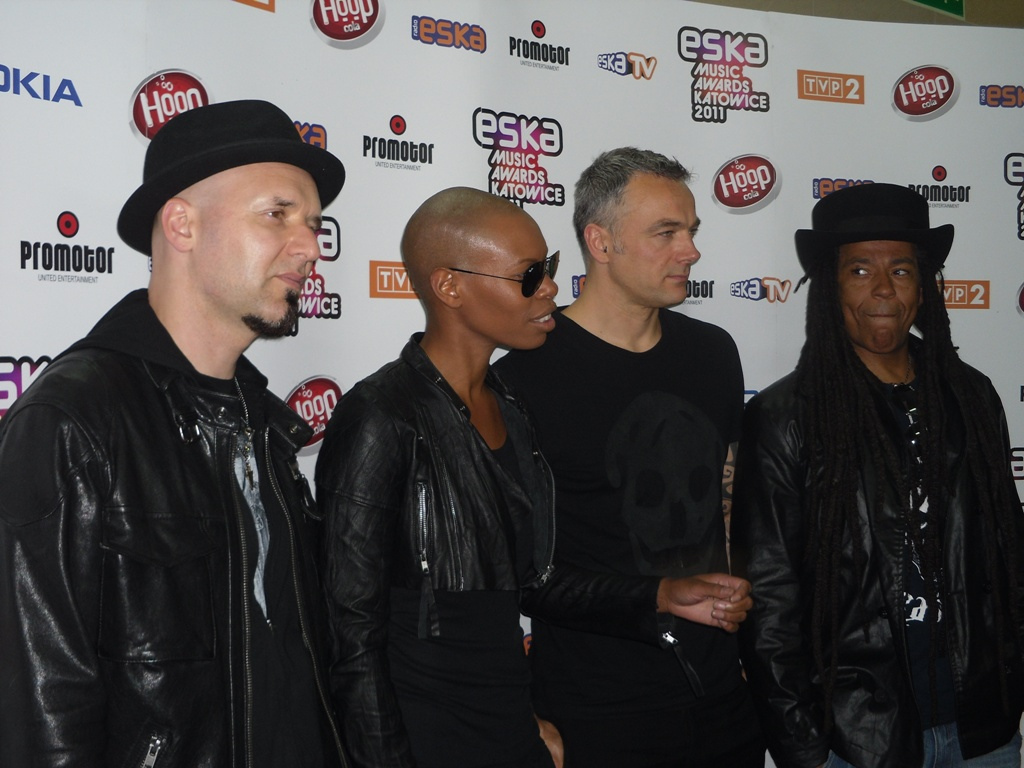
Skunk Anansie's second studio album Stoosh returned to number one on the chart in 1997 for five weeks.

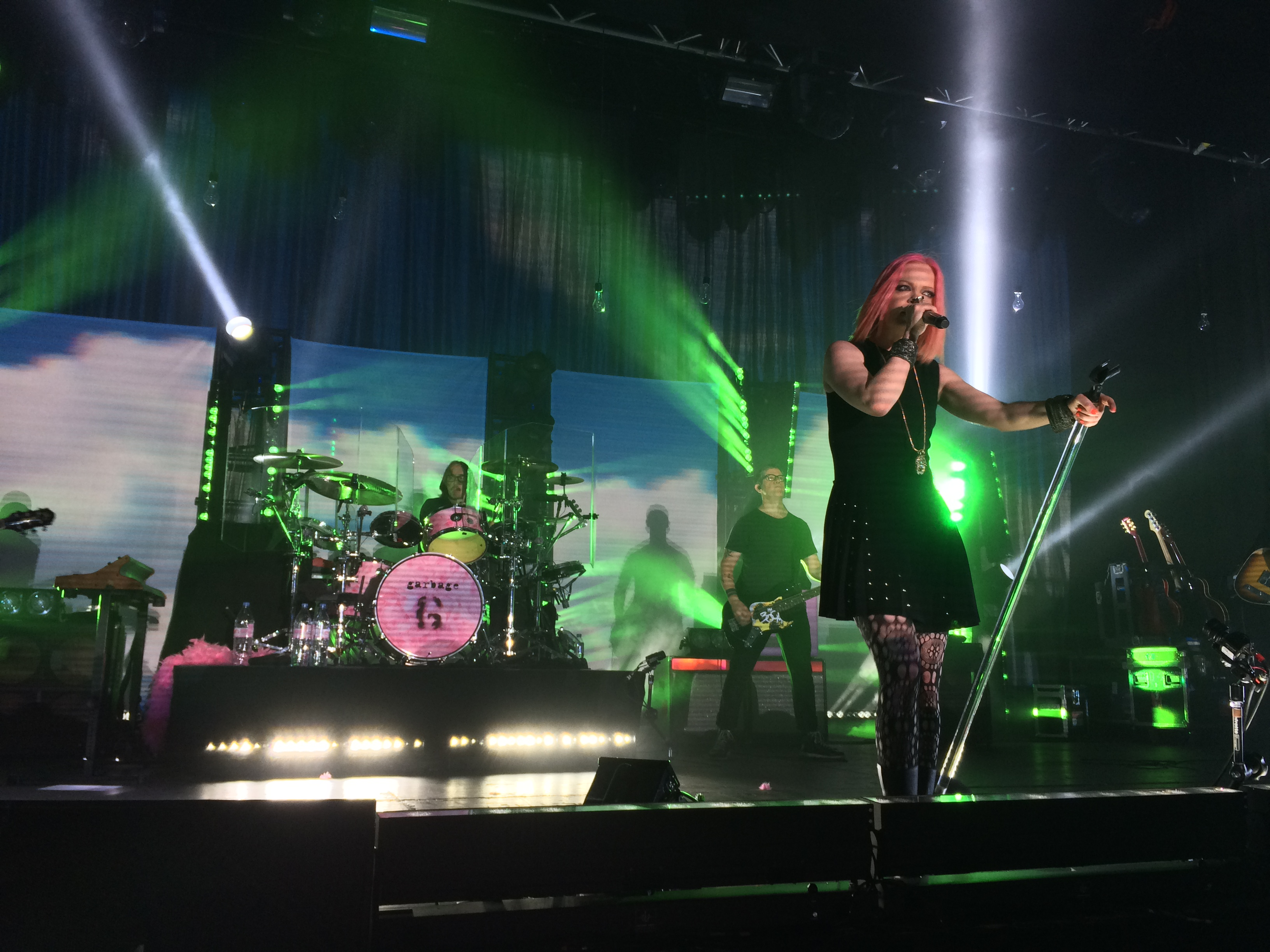
The self-titled debut album by Garbage spent three weeks at number one.

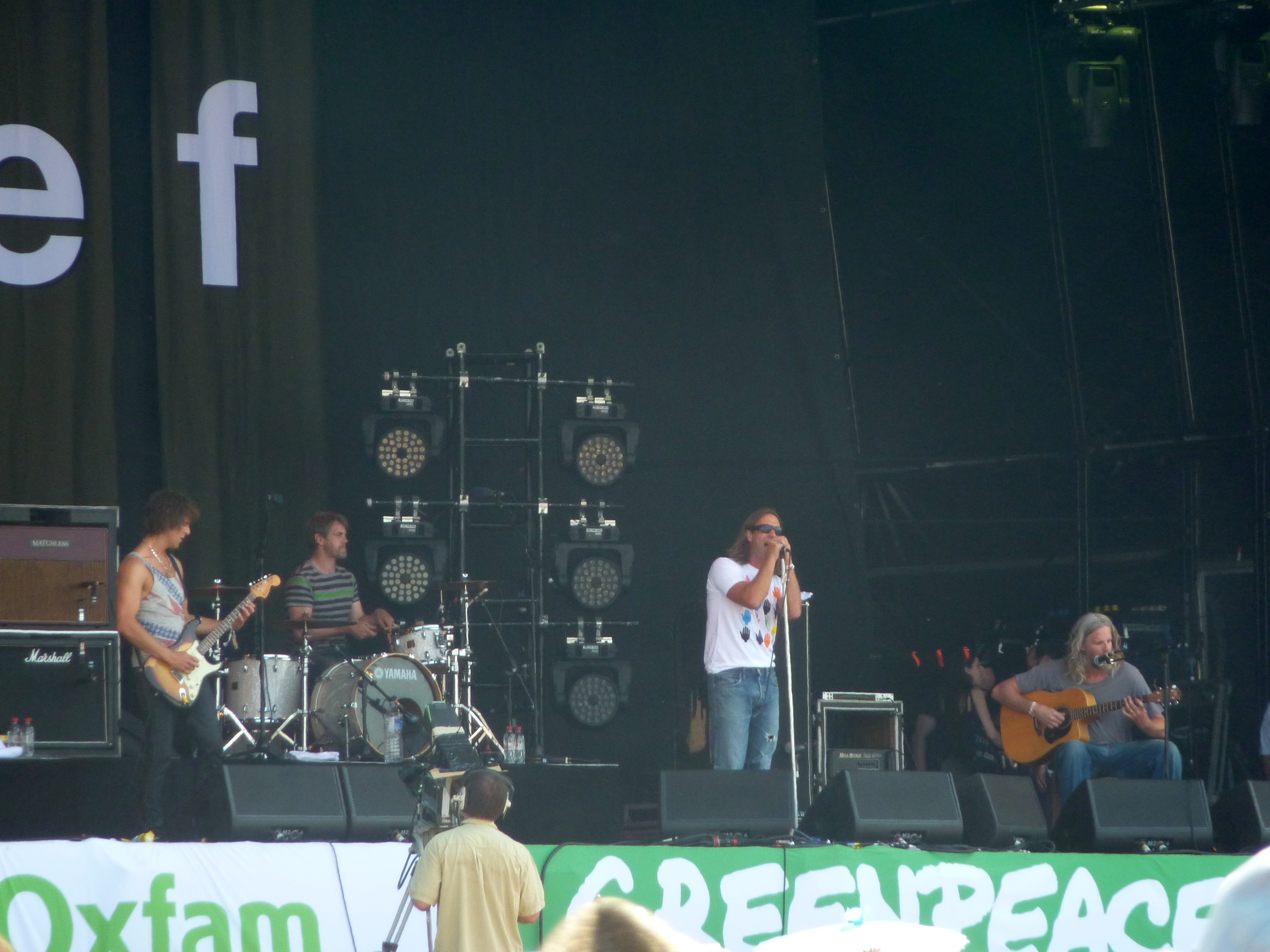
Reef's second album Glow was number one for three weeks in February.

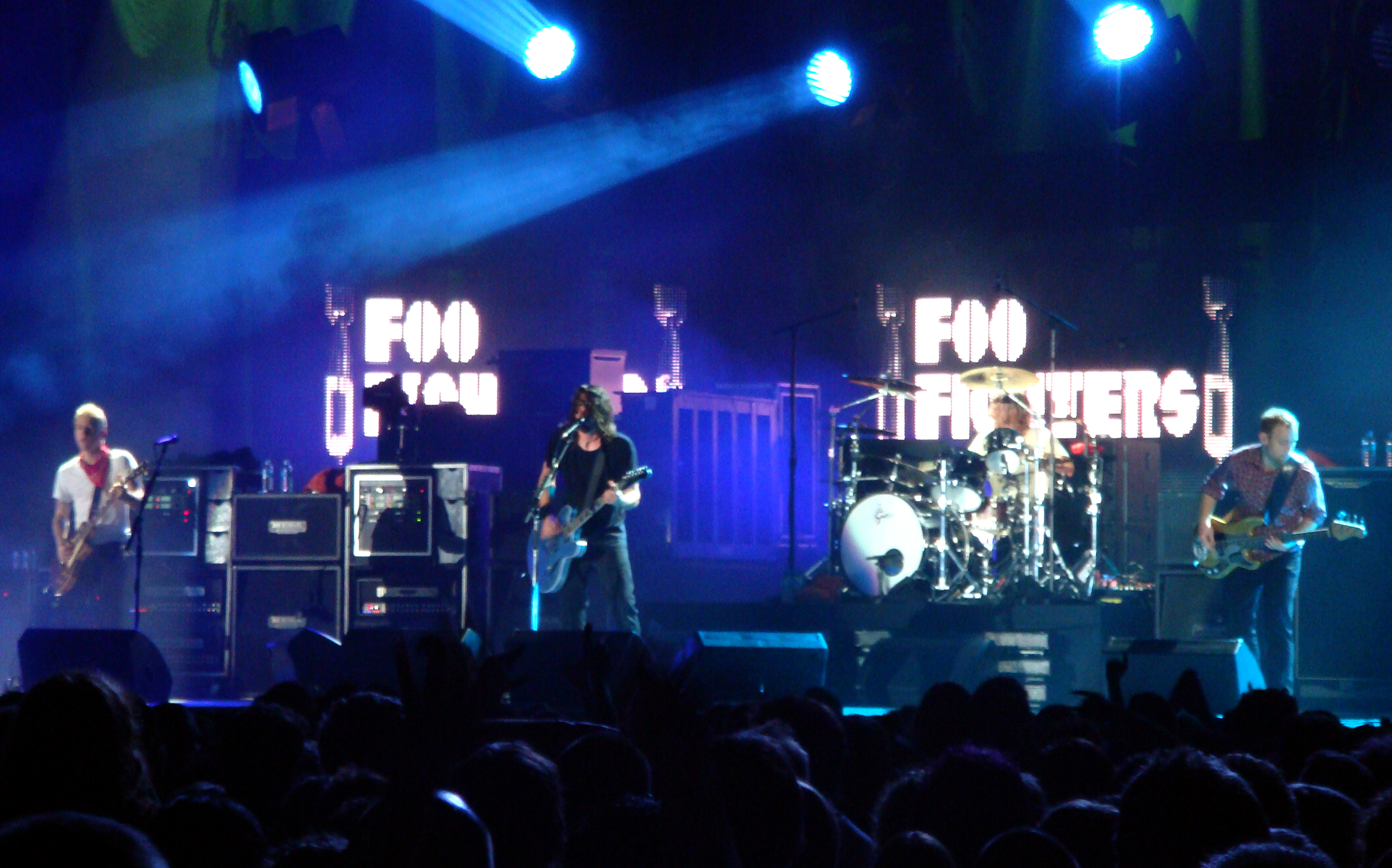
Foo Fighters spent three weeks at number one in 1997 with their second album The Colour and the Shape.

Key
†	Indicates best-selling rock album of 1997

Issue date	Album	Artist(s)	Record label(s)	Ref.
4 January	Garbage	Garbage	Mushroom	
11 January	Garbage	Garbage	Mushroom	
18 January	Garbage	Garbage	Mushroom	
25 January	Greatest Hits: Feel the Noize	Slade	Polydor	
1 February	Razorblade Suitcase	Bush	Interscope	
8 February	Glow	Reef	S2	
15 February	Glow	Reef	S2	
22 February	Glow	Reef	S2	
1 March	Tragic Kingdom †	No Doubt	Interscope	
8 March	Tragic Kingdom †	No Doubt	Interscope	
15 March	Tragic Kingdom †	No Doubt	Interscope	
22 March	Nine Lives	Aerosmith	Columbia	
29 March	Tragic Kingdom †	No Doubt	Interscope	
5 April	Tragic Kingdom †	No Doubt	Interscope	
12 April	Tragic Kingdom †	No Doubt	Interscope	
19 April	Tragic Kingdom †	No Doubt	Interscope	
26 April	Tragic Kingdom †	No Doubt	Interscope	
3 May	This Strange Engine	Marillion	Raw Power	
10 May	First Rays of the New Rising Sun	Jimi Hendrix	MCA	
17 May	Tragic Kingdom †	No Doubt	Interscope	
24 May	The Colour and the Shape	Foo Fighters	Roswell	
31 May	The Colour and the Shape	Foo Fighters	Roswell	
7 June	The Colour and the Shape	Foo Fighters	Roswell	
14 June	Stoosh	Skunk Anansie	One Little Indian	
21 June	Album of the Year	Faith No More	Slash	
28 June	Destination Anywhere	Jon Bon Jovi	Mercury	
5 July	Destination Anywhere	Jon Bon Jovi	Mercury	
12 July	Stoosh	Skunk Anansie	One Little Indian	
19 July	Tragic Kingdom †	No Doubt	Interscope	
26 July	Tragic Kingdom †	No Doubt	Interscope	
2 August	Tragic Kingdom †	No Doubt	Interscope	
9 August	Tragic Kingdom †	No Doubt	Interscope	
16 August	Stoosh	Skunk Anansie	One Little Indian	
23 August	Stoosh	Skunk Anansie	One Little Indian	
30 August	Stoosh	Skunk Anansie	One Little Indian	
6 September	Remasters	Led Zeppelin	Atlantic	
13 September	Remasters	Led Zeppelin	Atlantic	
20 September	Remasters	Led Zeppelin	Atlantic	
27 September	Remasters	Led Zeppelin	Atlantic	
4 October	Remasters	Led Zeppelin	Atlantic	
11 October	Remasters	Led Zeppelin	Atlantic	
18 October	Remasters	Led Zeppelin	Atlantic	
25 October	Nimrod	Green Day	Reprise	
1 November	Nimrod	Green Day	Reprise	
8 November	Endless Nameless	The Wildhearts	Mushroom	
15 November	Queen Rocks	Queen	Parlophone	
22 November	Queen Rocks	Queen	Parlophone	
29 November	BBC Sessions	Led Zeppelin	Atlantic	
6 December	Queen Rocks	Queen	Parlophone	
13 December	Queen Rocks	Queen	Parlophone	
20 December	Queen Rocks	Queen	Parlophone	
27 December	Queen Rocks	Queen	Parlophone	

== See also ==
- 1997 in British music
- List of UK Rock & Metal Singles Chart number ones of 1997
