= Emma Ejwertz =

Swedish musician and singer-songwriter

- Born: Emma Lovisa Katarina Ejwertz; November 22, 1987 (age 38)
- Origin: Båstad, Sweden
- Genres: Rock, electronica, pop
- Occupations: Musician, singer-songwriter
- Instruments: Vocals, guitar, keyboards, piano
- Years active: 1998–present
- Label: Mouse Driven Music
- Formerly of: Nerviosa
- Website: emmaejwertz.net

Emma Lovisa Katarina Ejwertz (born November 22, 1986) is a Swedish musician and singer-songwriter.

== Biography ==
=== Early years ===
Emma Ejwertz is a Swedish singer/songwriter who grew up in southwest Sweden. In recent years she has been living in Los Angeles. Emma has been writing songs since she started listening to Fleetwood Mac, Janis Joplin and Nirvana in her early teens. She studied music at a performance arts high school in Sweden before coming to Los Angeles as an exchange student in her senior year of high school. After graduating high school, Emma was briefly married and shortly divorced retaining dual citizenship.

=== L.A. Life (2002–Present) ===
While pursuing her music career in Los Angeles, Emma met Scott Weiland and Douglas Grean. She performed for them at their recording studio in Burbank and they recorded a demo with her after being impressed with her voice and guitar playing. Scott sang backup on many songs, including a cover of "Heart Shaped Box".

When Emma's vision for her demo differed and Scott became unavailable, she began to look around for a new producer. Emma was introduced to Steve Gryphon in 2004 through an A&R representative. They completed work on a new demo with a more pop direction in December 2004, but Emma returned to Sweden when a Swedish version of one of her demo tracks allowed her to be awarded the Ted Gärdestad scholarship in Sweden. That offered Emma the chance to appear on television in Sweden and perform her song, "Tilda", in front of audiences there.

Emma returned to the US in 2005 and started a new band, Nerviosa. The band parted ways in 2007 and Emma focused once more on her solo career. She reunited with producer Steve Gryphon to record her first independent release, "Dizzy Arms". The album included one song she had originally written for Nerviosa, "Pavement", and showcased Emma's guitar playing and unique sound, as well as her haunting vocals.

In 2008, Emma was chosen to sing the main title for season 2 of the FX network Dirt TV series. Many songs from her album were used in the show, which starred Courteney Cox, and "We're Not Beautiful" gathered public interest when it was used to score a steamy scene between Cox and her co-star, Josh Stewart. "It Makes Sense" was used in The Starter Wife (TV series) from USA Network and scores the conclusion of that series.

After the release of "Dizzy Arms", Emma made the acquaintance of Mark Pellington when she submitted a song to the contest promoting his film "Henry Poole Is Here". Mark directed a video for the song "We're Not Beautiful", and the publicity from the contest brought Emma in touch with David Neibla, who directed a video for the song "Killer".

In 2012 Emma Ejwertz released her second record "Tondra".

Her song "Dizzy Arms" was featured in the hit TV show 'It's Always Sunny in Philadelphia' in 2012.

Emma also shoot music videos from her second record for the tunes Vultures, Here and Aura. She is planning an upcoming tour in 2013 in the US and Scandinavia.

Emma is currently working on a new album, this album will be a collection of self written songs, and collaboration with late Scott Weiland, to be released in the year 2024.

== Discography ==
- 2008: Dizzy Arms
- 2012: Tondra
