= Destination Anywhere (Jon Bon Jovi album) =

Studio album by Jon Bon Jovi
- Released: June 16, 1997
- Recorded: February – November 1996
- Studio: Chapel Studios (Los Angeles, California); A&M Studios (Hollywood, California); The Sanctuary (Caldwell, New Jersey); Right Track Recording and Quad Recording Studios (New York City, New York); The Gentlemen's Club (Miami Beach, Florida); Studio 4 Recording (Conshohocken, Pennsylvania); Ding Bat Sound (Pennsylvania); Sarm West Studios (London, UK)
- Genre: Rock; indie rock
- Length: 63:08
- Label: Mercury
- Producer: Dave Stewart; Stephen Lironi; Jon Bon Jovi; Desmond Child; Eric Bazilian

Jon Bon Jovi chronology
Blaze of Glory (1990)	Destination Anywhere (1997)	The Power Station Years: The Unreleased Recordings (2001)

Singles from Destination Anywhere
- 1. "Midnight in Chelsea" Released: June 2, 1997; 2. "Queen of New Orleans" Released: August 18, 1997; 3. "Janie, Don't Take Your Love to Town" Released: September 26, 1997; 4. "Ugly" Released: April 6, 1998

Professional ratings
Review scores
Source	Rating
AllMusic	4/5 stars
Entertainment Weekly	B+
NME	3/10
The Rolling Stone Album Guide	3/5 stars
Uncut	4/5 stars

Destination Anywhere is the second solo studio album by Jon Bon Jovi, released on June 16, 1997 and features music from the film Destination Anywhere released in the same year. It follows his successful 1990 soundtrack Blaze of Glory, from the film Young Guns II.

The production and style for Destination Anywhere departs from the hard rock sound of his albums with the group Bon Jovi, such as featuring drum loops, female backing vocals and Jon Bon Jovi himself singing in a lower register in most of the tracks. Only one of his longtime bandmates, keyboardist David Bryan, contributed to the album; though Desmond Child, cowriter of hits such as "Livin' on a Prayer", plays the tuba in the song "Ugly" and is also one of the producers.

== Reception ==
=== Commercial ===
The album charted at number 31 on the Billboard 200, number 6 on the Top Canadian albums chart and number two on the UK Albums Chart. The first single "Midnight in Chelsea" was Jon Bon Jovi's highest-charting solo single in the UK, reaching number four on the UK Singles Chart. Also charting in the UK was the second single "Queen of New Orleans" at number 10 and the third single "Janie, Don't Take Your Love to Town" at number 13. The fourth single "Ugly" charted in some European countries but not in the UK. "Staring at Your Window with a Suitcase in My Hand" was released as a promo single.

=== Critical ===
AllMusic critic Stephen Thomas Erlewine described it as "a fine example of late-'90s mainstream pop" and "a breakthrough for Bon Jovi, because it is the first time he sounds like he's come to terms with adulthood." Nevertheless, he criticized the presence of fillers on the record. Chuck Eddy of Entertainment Weekly wrote: "Almost every track on Destination Anywhere could be faster, shorter, and less world-weary, but Bon Jovi's melodies feel indelible nonetheless."

== Film ==
Destination Anywhere: The Film (also released in 1997) was produced and incorporated music and concepts from the album. It stars Jon Bon Jovi and Demi Moore as a young couple struggling with alcoholism and the death of their young child. It debuted on both MTV and VH1 in 1997 and also stars Kevin Bacon, Whoopi Goldberg, and Annabella Sciorra. Directed by Mark Pellington, it was released on DVD on April 11, 2005, and contains the film, Destination Anywhere, the EPK for the album, and five promotional videos for the singles of the album. The track "It's Just Me" also features in full during the film.

== Track listing ==
All songs written and composed by Jon Bon Jovi, except where noted.

No.	Title	Writer(s)	Length
1.	"Queen of New Orleans"	Jon Bon Jovi, Dave Stewart	4:31
2.	"Janie, Don't Take Your Love to Town"	Jon Bon Jovi	5:18
3.	"Midnight in Chelsea"	Jon Bon Jovi, Dave Stewart	4:58
4.	"Ugly"	Jon Bon Jovi, Eric Bazilian	3:24
5.	"Staring at Your Window with a Suitcase in My Hand"	Jon Bon Jovi	4:26
6.	"Every Word Was a Piece of My Heart"	Jon Bon Jovi	5:16
7.	"It's Just Me"	Jon Bon Jovi	6:44
8.	"Destination Anywhere"	Jon Bon Jovi	4:56
9.	"Learning How to Fall"	Jon Bon Jovi	4:04
10.	"Naked"	Jon Bon Jovi, Mark Hudson, Greg Wells	4:42
11.	"Little City"	Jon Bon Jovi	4:58
12.	"August 7, 4:15"	Jon Bon Jovi	4:59
13.	"Cold Hard Heart"	Jon Bon Jovi	4:42

Japan bonus track
No.	Title	Writer(s)	Length
14.	"I Talk to Jesus"	Jon Bon Jovi	5:20

Argentina bonus track
No.	Title	Writer(s)	Length
14.	"Miro a tu Ventana" (Spanish version of "Staring at Your Window...")	Jon Bon Jovi	4:26

France bonus track
No.	Title	Writer(s)	Length
15.	"Sad Song Night"	Desmond Child, Jon Bon Jovi, Eric Bazilian	3:52

=== Limited edition ===
CD2: Jon Bon Jovi – Live
No.	Title	Writer(s)	Length
1.	"Queen of New Orleans"	Jon Bon Jovi, Dave Stewart	5:16
2.	"Midnight in Chelsea"	Jon Bon Jovi, Dave Stewart	5:41
3.	"Destination Anywhere"	Jon Bon Jovi	5:26
4.	"Ugly"	Jon Bon Jovi, Eric Bazilian	3:31
5.	"It's Just Me"	Jon Bon Jovi	7:15
6.	"August 7, 4:15"	Jon Bon Jovi	5:26
7.	"Jailbreak"	Phil Lynott	4:28
8.	"Not Fade Away"	Charles Hardin, Norman Petty	3:38
9.	"Janie, Don't Take Your Love to Town (Acoustic)"	Jon Bon Jovi	3:23

== Personnel ==
- Jon Bon Jovi – vocals, acoustic guitar (2, 4, 12), electric guitar (2, 12), backing vocals (2, 3, 6, 9), guitars (3, 6, 8–11), harmonica (4), acoustic piano (8, 12)
- Imogen Heap – keyboards (1)
- Andy Wright – programming (1, 7)
- Guy Davis – acoustic piano (2), Hammond organ (2)
- Stephen Lironi – programming (2, 6, 8–11), loops (2, 5, 6, 9, 10), keyboards (5), electric guitar (5, 6, 8), synthesizers (8, 9, 11), acoustic guitar (9, 10)
- Alex Silva – keyboards (3), programming (3)
- Rob Hyman – Wurlitzer electric piano (4)
- David Bryan – acoustic piano (5), accordion (5)
- Jerry Cohen – organ (5, 6, 8), keyboards (10, 11)
- Terry Disley – keyboards (7, 12)
- Paul Taylor – programming (12)
- David A. Stewart – guitars (1, 3, 7)
- Bobby Bandiera – lead guitar (2, 10), guitars (6), slide guitar (8)
- Eric Bazilian – electric guitar (4), lead guitar (7)
- Lance Quinn – guitars (5, 8, 11)
- Aldo Nova – guitars (10)
- Kurt Johnston – dobro (9)
- Hugh McDonald – bass
- Kenny Aronoff – drums
- Desmond Child – tuba (4)
- David Campbell – string arrangements (2)
- Teese Gohl – string arrangements (3)
- Alexandra Brown – backing vocals (1)
- Bridgette Bryant – backing vocals (1)
- Maxayne Lewis – backing vocals (1)
- Zhana Saunders – backing vocals (3)
- Helena Christensen – backing vocals (6)
- Dean Fasano – backing vocals (10)
- Mark Hudson – backing vocals (10)
- Mardette Lynch – backing vocals (12)

=== Production ===
- Steve Greenberg – A&R
- David A. Stewart – producer (1, 7, 12)
- Jon Bon Jovi – producer (2, 3, 5, 6, 8–13)
- Stephen Lironi – producer (2, 3, 5, 6, 8–11)
- Desmond Child – producer (4)
- Eric Bazilian – producer (4)
- Jeff Schulz – design
- Anton Corbijn – photography
- Bruce Weber – photography

Technical

- George Marino – mastering at Sterling Sound (New York, NY)
- John "Obie" O'Brien – engineer (1, 3, 4, 7, 12, 14), mixing (1–8, 10–14), remixing (2, 3, 12)
- Niven Garland – engineer (2, 6, 8–11), mixing (9)
- Lee Manning – assistant engineer (1, 4, 7, 12)
- Mike Woglom – assistant engineer (1, 7, 12)
- Marc Lane – mix assistant (1, 7, 12)
- Mark Springer – assistant engineer (2, 5, 6, 8–11, 13)
- Jim Labinski – mix assistant (2, 3)
- Ann Mincieli – remix assistant (2, 3, 12), mix assistant (4–6, 8, 10, 11)
- Mike Rew – remix assistant (2, 3, 12), mix assistant (4–6, 8, 10, 11)
- Pete Karam – assistant engineer (3)
- Mikey Malak – assistant engineer (4)
- Robert Valdez – assistant engineer (4)
- Matt Curry – mix assistant (9)
- Charles Dye – additional recording (4)
- Cage Gondar – additional recording (4)
- Andrew Roshberg – additional recording (4)
- José Cristobal Ulloa – additional recording (4)
- John Hougdahl – technicIan
- Michael Bilkoski, Tony Blanc, Tony Bongiovi, Pat Brannon, Rick Britton, David Davidian, Bobby Deluca, Mike Farese, Marty Gelhaar, Moe Haggedone, Rocky Holman, Mark Springer and Danny Stewart – technical support

== Charts ==
=== Weekly charts ===
Chart (1997)	Peak position
Australian Albums (ARIA)	4
Austrian Albums (Ö3 Austria)	1
Belgian Albums (Ultratop Flanders)	6
Belgian Albums (Ultratop Wallonia)	21
Canadian Albums (Billboard)	6
Dutch Albums (Album Top 100)	4
Finnish Albums (Suomen virallinen lista)	2
French Albums (SNEP)	15
German Albums (Offizielle Top 100)	1
Hungarian Albums (MAHASZ)	12
New Zealand Albums (RMNZ)	34
Norwegian Albums (VG-lista)	15
Scottish Albums (OCC)	4
Swedish Albums (Sverigetopplistan)	7
Swiss Albums (Schweizer Hitparade)	1
UK Albums (OCC)	2
US Billboard 200	31

=== Year-end charts ===
Chart (1997)	Position
Australian Albums (ARIA)	89
Austrian Albums (Ö3 Austria)	23
Belgian Albums (Ultratop Flanders)	82
Dutch Albums (Album Top 100)	56
German Albums (Offizielle Top 100)	26
Swiss Albums (Schweizer Hitparade)	26
UK Albums (OCC)	83

== Certifications ==
Region	Certification	Certified units/sales
Argentina (CAPIF)	Gold	30,000^{^}
Australia (ARIA)	Gold	35,000^{^}
Austria (IFPI Austria)	Gold	25,000^{*}
Brazil (Pro-Música Brasil)	Gold	100,000^{*}
Canada (Music Canada)	Platinum	100,000^{^}
Germany (BVMI)	Platinum	500,000^{^}
Japan (RIAJ)	Platinum	200,000^{^}
Spain (Promusicae)	Platinum	100,000^{^}
Switzerland (IFPI Switzerland)	Platinum	50,000^{^}
United Kingdom (BPI)	Gold	100,000^{^}
Summaries
Europe (IFPI)	Platinum	1,000,000^{*}
^{*} Sales figures based on certification alone.^{^} Shipments figures based on certification alone.
