= Janie, Don't Take Your Love to Town =

1997 single by Jon Bon Jovi

Single by Jon Bon Jovi

from the album Destination Anywhere
- Written: June 1996 (Amsterdam)
- Released: September 26, 1997
- Recorded: August 1996
- Studio: Sanctuary (New Jersey)
- Length: 3:53
- Label: Mercury
- Songwriter: Jon Bon Jovi
- Producers: Stephen Lironi; Jon Bon Jovi

Jon Bon Jovi singles chronology
| "Queen of New Orleans" (1997) | "Janie, Don't Take Your Love to Town" (1997) | "Ugly" (1998) |

"Janie, Don't Take Your Love to Town" is a song by American rock singer Jon Bon Jovi. It was released in September 1997 as the third single from his second solo album, Destination Anywhere (1997). Commercially, the song reached number 13 on the UK Singles Chart and number 18 on Canada's RPM 100 Hit Tracks chart. The song features a music video that was included on the DVD Destination Anywhere: The Film.

== Critical reception ==
British magazine Music Week rated "Janie, Don't Take Your Love to Town" three out of five, adding, "Written after a row with Mrs Bon Jovi, the third single from Destination Anywhere is a plaintive cry, delivered with passion. Simple but nicely effective."

== Track listings ==
All songs were written by Jon Bon Jovi.

- UK CD1
1. "Janie, Don't Take Your Love to Town" (radio edit) – 3:53
2. "Talk to Jesus" (demo) – 5:11
3. "Billy Get Your Guns" (live) – 5:07
4. "Janie, Don't Take Your Love to Town" – 5:17
- UK CD2
1. "Janie, Don't Take Your Love to Town" (album version) – 5:18
2. "Destination Anywhere" (live acoustic) – 4:43
3. "It's Just Me" (live acoustic) – 4:06
4. "Janie, Don't Take Your Love to Town" (live acoustic) – 3:23
- UK cassette single
1. "Janie, Don't Take Your Love to Town" (radio edit) – 3:53
2. "Talk to Jesus" (demo) – 5:11

== Credits and personnel ==
Credits are lifted from the Destination Anywhere album booklet.

Recording

- Written in Amsterdam in June 1996
- Recorded and produced at Sanctuary Studios (New Jersey) in August 1996
- Mixed at A&M Studios (Hollywood, California)
- Remixed at Quad Studios (New York City)
- Mastered at Sterling Sound (New York City)

Personnel

- Jon Bon Jovi – writing, vocals, backing vocals, electric and acoustic guitar, production
- Stephen Lironi – loops, production, programming
- Bobby Bandiera – lead guitar
- Hugh McDonald – bass
- Guy Davis – piano, Hammond organ
- Kenny Aronoff – drums
- David Campbell – string arrangement
- Obie O'Brien – mixing, remixing
- Jim Labinski – mixing assistance
- Ann Mincieli – remixing assistance
- Mike Rew – remixing assistance
- Niven Garland – engineering
- Mark Springer – engineering assistance
- George Marino – mastering

== Charts ==
| Chart (1997) | Peak position |
|---|---|
| Austria (Ö3 Austria Top 40) | 40 |
| Belgium (Ultratip Bubbling Under Flanders) | 13 |
| Canada Top Singles (RPM) | 18 |
| Europe (Eurochart Hot 100) | 65 |
| Germany (GfK) | 38 |
| Netherlands (Single Top 100) | 61 |
| Scottish Singles Sales (Official Charts) | 14 |
| UK Singles (Official Charts) | 13 |

== Release history ==
| Region | Date | Format(s) | Label(s) | Ref. |
|---|---|---|---|---|
| United States | August 5, 1997 | Contemporary hit radio | Mercury | |
| Japan | September 26, 1997 | CD | Mercury | |
| United Kingdom | November 3, 1997 | CD; cassette | Mercury | |
