= Destination Anywhere (film) =

Destination Anywhere: The Film
- Promotional poster
- Directed by: Mark Pellington
- Written by: Stuart Cohn; Mark Pellington; Tom Gorai
- Produced by: Tom Gorai
- Starring: Jon Bon Jovi; Demi Moore; Kevin Bacon; Whoopi Goldberg; Annabella Sciorra
- Cinematography: Bobby Bukowski
- Edited by: Leo Trombetta
- Music by: Jon Bon Jovi
- Release dates: June 1997 (VHS); April 11, 2005 (DVD)
- Running time: 45 minutes
- Country: United States
- Language: English

Destination Anywhere: The Film (also known simply as Destination Anywhere), is an American film inspired by and featuring music and concepts from Jon Bon Jovi's second solo record Destination Anywhere. The film and album were released in June 1997. The film stars Jon Bon Jovi and Demi Moore as a young couple struggling with alcoholism and the death of their young child. Directed by Mark Pellington, the film debuted on both MTV and VH1 in 1997 and also stars Kevin Bacon, Whoopi Goldberg and Annabella Sciorra. The film was released on DVD on April 11, 2005 and includes five promotional music videos and the track "It's Just Me" also features in full during the film.

== Plot ==
The film is a contemporary film noir set on the streets of a gritty, yet colorful Manhattan neighborhood. Jon Bon Jovi stars as Jon, a man on the run from his home, his gambling debts, and his marriage. He is summoned back to New York to deal with his emotionally estranged wife, Janie, an emergency room nurse who has never fully recovered from the hit-and-run death of their only child several years ago. Jon returns to chaos, Janie is out of control and his debts have caused his life to be in danger. He struggles to cope with the troubles at home, but has built walls that are too thick to penetrate and the problems only escalate between Jon and Janie. When an abandoned baby is found in a dumpster and brought to the hospital where Janie works, a series of events is set in motion that forces the couple to reassess the terms of their love, responsibility and commitment to one another.

== Cast ==
- Jon Bon Jovi as Jon
- Demi Moore as Janie
- Annabella Sciorra as Dorothy
- Kevin Bacon as Mike
- Whoopi Goldberg as Cabbie

== Soundtrack ==
The Soundtrack also released in 1997 charted at #31 on The Billboard 200, #6 on the Top Canadian albums chart and #2 on the UK Albums Chart

No.	Title	Writer(s)	Length
1.	"Queen of New Orleans"	Jon Bon Jovi, Dave Stewart	4:31
2.	"Janie, Don't Take Your Love to Town"	Jon Bon Jovi	5:18
3.	"Midnight in Chelsea"	Jon Bon Jovi, Dave Stewart	4:58
4.	"Ugly"	Jon Bon Jovi, Eric Bazilian	3:24
5.	"Staring at Your Window with a Suitcase in My Hand"	Jon Bon Jovi	4:26
6.	"Every Word Was a Piece of My Heart"	Jon Bon Jovi	5:16
7.	"It's Just Me"	Jon Bon Jovi	6:44
8.	"Destination Anywhere"	Jon Bon Jovi	4:56
9.	"Learning How to Fall"	Jon Bon Jovi	4:04
10.	"Naked"	Jon Bon Jovi, Mark Hudson, Greg Wells	4:42
11.	"Little City"	Jon Bon Jovi	4:58
12.	"August 7, 4:15"	Jon Bon Jovi	4:59
13.	"Cold Hard Heart"	Jon Bon Jovi	4:42

== Contents ==
- "Destination Anywhere" Film
- "Destination Anywhere"

Electronic Press Kit for the album.
Directed by Bruce Weber
A Little Bear Production

- "Midnight in Chelsea" Music video

Director: Wayne Isham

- "Janie, Don't Take Your Love to Town" Promo video (DVD version only)

Director: Mark Pellington

- "Ugly" Promo video (DVD version only)

Director: Mark Pellington

- "Queen of New Orleans" Promo video (DVD version only)

Director: Mark Pellington

- "Staring at Your Window with a Suitcase in My Hand" Promo video (DVD version only - Hidden video only viewable with the "Play All" function)

Director: Mark Pellington

== DVD bonus features ==
- Promo Videos for "Queen of New Orleans", "Janie, Don't Take Your Love to Town", "Ugly" and "Staring at Your Window with a Suitcase in My Hand", previously unreleased on VHS version.
- Digitally remastered picture and sound.
- DTS 5.1 Surround Sound.
