= Ugly (Jon Bon Jovi song) =

1998 single by Jon Bon Jovi

Single by Jon Bon Jovi

from the album Destination Anywhere
- Written: November 1996 (Philadelphia)
- Released: April 6, 1998
- Studio: Studio 4 (Philadelphia, Pennsylvania); Gentlemen's Club (Miami Beach, Florida); Sanctuary (New Jersey); Chapel (Los Angeles); Ding Bat Sound
- Length: 3:24
- Label: Mercury
- Songwriters: Jon Bon Jovi; Eric Bazilian
- Producers: Desmond Child; Eric Bazilian

Jon Bon Jovi singles chronology
"Janie, Don't Take Your Love to Town" (1997)	"Ugly" (1998)	""Bang a Drum" (with Chris LeDoux)" (1998)

"Ugly" is a song by American singer-songwriter Jon Bon Jovi that was the final single released from his second solo album, Destination Anywhere (1997).

== Promotion ==
“Ugly" was released only in German-speaking Europe on April 6, 1998, reaching number 39 in Austria, number 41 in Switzerland, and number 75 in Germany. The song features a music video that was released on the DVD Destination Anywhere: The Film.

== Track listing ==
German CD single

1. "Ugly" (radio edit) – 3:11
2. "Jersey Girl" (live) – 4:10
3. "Billy Get Your Guns" (live) – 5:15
4. "Ugly" (LP version) – 3:31

== Credits and personnel ==
Credits are lifted from the Destination Anywhere album booklet.

Recording

- Written in Philadelphia in November 1996
- Recorded and produced at Studio 4 (Philadelphia, Pennsylvania), Gentlemen's Club (Miami Beach, Florida), Sanctuary Studios (New Jersey), Chapel Studios (Los Angeles), and Ding Bat Sound
- Mixed at Quad Studios (New York City)
- Mastered at Sterling Sound (New York City)

Personnel

- Jon Bon Jovi – writing, vocals, acoustic guitar, harmonica
- Eric Bazilian – writing, electric guitar, production
- Hugh McDonald – bass
- Rob Hyman – Wurlitzer piano
- Kenny Aronoff – drums
- Desmond Child – tuba, production
- Charles Dye – additional recording
- Andy Roshberg – additional recording
- Cage Gondar – additional recording
- J. C. Ulloa – additional recording
- Obie O'Brien – mixing, engineering
- Ann Mincieli – mixing assistance
- Mike Rew – mixing assistance
- Robert Valdez – assistant engineering
- Mike Malak – assistant engineering
- Lee Manning – assistant engineering
- George Marino – mastering

== Charts ==
Chart (1998)	Peak position
Austria (Ö3 Austria Top 40)	39
Germany (GfK)	75
Switzerland (Schweizer Hitparade)	41
