= Bang a Drum =

1990 song by Jon Bon Jovi

Song by Jon Bon Jovi

from the album Blaze of Glory
- Released: August 7, 1990
- Genre: Rock
- Length: 4:44
- Label: Mercury
- Songwriter: Jon Bon Jovi
- Producers: Jon Bon Jovi, Danny Kortchmar

"Bang a Drum"

Single by Chris LeDoux and Jon Bon Jovi

from the album One Road Man
- Released: September 28, 1998
- Genre: Country rock, pop
- Length: 4:35
- Label: Capitol
- Songwriter: Jon Bon Jovi
- Producer: Trey Bruce

Chris LeDoux singles chronology
"Runaway Love" (1998)	"Bang a Drum" (1998)	"Life Is a Highway" (1999)

Jon Bon Jovi singles chronology
"Ugly" (1998)	"Bang a Drum" (1998)	"Not Running Anymore" (2012)

"Bang a Drum" is a country rock song written and originally performed by Jon Bon Jovi. Released in 1990, it featured on his Blaze of Glory album, which had songs that were inspired by the 1990 film sequel Young Guns II, and some songs directly from the film.

== Country version ==
In 1998, country singer Chris LeDoux covered "Bang a Drum", with Jon Bon Jovi performing guest vocals. The guitar solo was performed by guitar virtuoso Shawn Lane. It was featured on LeDoux's One Road Man album, produced by Trey Bruce and reached number 68 on the US Hot Country Songs. This version also features a music video.

== Charts ==
=== Chris LeDoux version ===
The song debuted at number 74 on the U.S. Billboard Hot Country Songs for the week of October 3, 1998.

Chart (1998)	Peak position
US Hot Country Songs (Billboard)	68

Chart (2022)	Peak position
Hungary (Single Top 40)	39
