= Midnight in Chelsea =

1997 single by Jon Bon Jovi

Single by Jon Bon Jovi

from the album Destination Anywhere
- Written: March 1996 (London)
- Released: June 2, 1997
- Recorded: December 1996
- Studio: Right Track (New York City)
- Genre: Funk rock
- Length: 4:53
- Label: Mercury
- Songwriters: Jon Bon Jovi; Dave Stewart
- Producers: Dave Stewart; Jon Bon Jovi

Jon Bon Jovi singles chronology
| "Never Say Die" (1991) | "Midnight in Chelsea" (1997) | "Queen of New Orleans" (1997) |

Music video
- "Midnight in Chelsea" on YouTube

"Midnight in Chelsea" is a song by American rock singer Jon Bon Jovi, released by Mercury Records as the first single from his second solo album, Destination Anywhere (1997), in June 1997. The song is written and produced by Bon Jovi and Dave Stewart, and is Bon Jovi's highest-charting solo single in the UK, reaching number four on the UK Singles Chart. The song also charted at number 57 on the US Billboard Hot 100 Airplay chart and number 11 on the Canadian RPM 100 Hit Tracks chart. Its highest peak was in Spain, where it reached number one for two weeks.

== Critical reception ==
Larry Flick from Billboard magazine wrote, "You may need to double-check the CD single sleeve to remind yourself that this is, in fact, a Jon Bon Jovi recording. The man who has made millions of teenage girls swoon with his pop/metal musings previews his forthcoming solo outing, Destination Anywhere, with a sharply time-sensitive slice of funk/rock. This richly textured track opens with a shuffling, hip-hop-spiked drum loop that will unlock many a top 40 door without turning off faithful mainstream rock stations. However, Bon Jovi and co-producer Dave Stewart wisely steer down an appropriately guitar-paved road after the first few bars of the song. Factor in a markedly more mature and restrained vocal and a maddeningly memorable la-la-la chorus, and you have the makings of a smash that will ring in a bright new career phase for the artist." David Sinclair from The Times viewed the song as a "middle-of-the-road taster" from Bon Jovi's solo album.

== Music video ==
The song's video was shot in the Chelsea neighborhood of Manhattan, with the Hotel Chelsea as a primary location. However, the song is actually about the London neighbourhood from which the Manhattan locale indirectly took its name, as evidenced by lyrics that refer to London topics such as Sloane Rangers, The Sun and "a big red bus". The usual description of lyrics do not include capital letters for The Sun. The music video was released on the DVD Destination Anywhere: The Film. At the time, the singer was filming "The Leading Man" in 1996 and was based in London which inspired the song.

== Track listings ==
All songs were written by Jon Bon Jovi. Additional writers are credited in parentheses.

- UK and Australian CD1
1. "Midnight in Chelsea" (single edit) (Dave Stewart) – 4:03
2. "Sad Song Night" (Eric Bazillian, Desmond Child) – 4:11
3. "August 7" (acoustic version) – 4:12
4. "Midnight in Chelsea" (album version) (Stewart) – 4:58
- UK and Australian CD2; Japanese CD single
1. "Midnight in Chelsea" (single edit) (Dave Stewart) – 4:03
2. "Drive" (demo) – 4:14
3. "Every Word Was a Piece of My Heart" (Dave Stuart mix) – 4:39
4. "Midnight in Chelsea" (album version) (Stewart) – 4:58
- UK cassette single and European CD single
1. "Midnight in Chelsea" (single edit) (Stewart) – 4:03
2. "Midnight in Chelsea" (album version) (Stewart) – 4:58

== Credits and personnel ==
Credits are lifted from the Destination Anywhere album booklet.

Recording

- Written in London in March 1996
- Recorded and produced at Right Track Studios (New York City) in December 1996
- Mixed at A&M Studios (Hollywood, California)
- Remixed at Quad Studios (New York City)
- Mastered at Sterling Sound (New York City)

Personnel

- Jon Bon Jovi – writing, vocals, backing vocals, guitar, production
- Dave Stewart – writing, guitar, production
- Zhana Saunders – backing vocals
- Hugh McDonald – bass
- Alex Silva – keyboards, programming
- Kenny Aronoff – drums
- Teese Gohl – string arrangement
- Obie O'Brien – mixing, engineering, remixing
- Jim Labinski – mixing assistance
- Peter Karam – engineering assistance
- Ann Mincieli – remixing assistance
- Mike Rew – remixing assistance
- George Marino – mastering

== Charts ==
=== Weekly charts ===
| Chart (1997) | Peak position |
|---|---|
| Australia (ARIA) | 17 |
| Austria (Ö3 Austria Top 40) | 8 |
| Belgium (Ultratop 50 Flanders) | 24 |
| Canada Top Singles (RPM) | 11 |
| Canada Adult Contemporary (RPM) | 14 |
| Europe (Eurochart Hot 100) | 4 |
| Finland (Suomen virallinen lista) | 2 |
| Germany (GfK) | 9 |
| Hungary (Mahasz) | 6 |
| Iceland (Íslenski Listinn Topp 40) | 21 |
| Ireland (IRMA) | 13 |
| Israel (Israeli Singles Chart) | 17 |
| Italy (Musica e dischi) | 13 |
| Italy Airplay (Music & Media) | 2 |
| Netherlands (Dutch Top 40) | 9 |
| Netherlands (Single Top 100) | 16 |
| Norway (VG-lista) | 14 |
| Scottish Singles Sales (Official Charts) | 4 |
| Spain (AFYVE) | 1 |
| Sweden (Sverigetopplistan) | 49 |
| Switzerland (Schweizer Hitparade) | 5 |
| UK Singles (Official Charts) | 4 |
| UK Rock & Metal (Official Charts) | 1 |
| US Radio Songs (Billboard) | 57 |
| US Adult Pop Airplay (Billboard) | 29 |
| US Pop Airplay (Billboard) | 30 |

=== Year-end charts ===
| Chart (1997) | Position |
|---|---|
| Canada Top Singles (RPM) | 80 |
| Canada Adult Contemporary (RPM) | 84 |
| Romania (Romanian Top 100) | 88 |
| UK Singles (OCC) | 145 |

== Release history ==
| Region | Date | Format(s) | Label(s) | Ref(s). |
|---|---|---|---|---|
| United States | May 13, 1997 | Adult contemporary; contemporary hit radio | Mercury | |
| United Kingdom | June 2, 1997 | CD; cassette | Mercury | |
| Japan | June 4, 1997 | CD | Mercury | |
