= Henry Poole Is Here =

- Promotional poster
- Directed by: Mark Pellington
- Written by: Albert Torres
- Produced by: Gary Gilbert; Tom Lassally; Tom Rosenberg; Gary Lucchesi; Richard S. Wright
- Starring: Luke Wilson; Radha Mitchell; Adriana Barraza; Cheryl Hines; George Lopez; Richard Benjamin
- Cinematography: Eric Schmidt
- Edited by: Lisa Zeno Churgin
- Music by: John Frizzell
- Production company: Lakeshore Entertainment
- Distributed by: Overture Films
- Release date: August 15, 2008
- Running time: 99 minutes
- Country: United States
- Language: English
- Box office: $1.8 million

Henry Poole Is Here is a 2008 American comedy-drama film directed by Mark Pellington. The screenplay by Albert Torres focuses on a dying man whose religious neighbor insists the water stain on the side wall of his house is an image of Jesus Christ.

The film premiered at the 2008 Sundance Film Festival and was shown at the Berlin International Film Festival before going into limited release in the US on August 15.

== Plot ==
Having been diagnosed as terminally ill, Henry Poole purchases a tract house in his hometown, a working class suburb of Los Angeles, and awaits the inevitable, fortified with whiskey and frozen pizza. His peaceful solitude and self-imposed exile are disrupted by his meddling neighbor Esperanza Martinez, who insists she sees the face of Christ embedded in the stucco wall of his home and is convinced the image has miraculous powers when it begins to exude drops of blood. Before long, she is leading pilgrimages to his backyard and inviting Father Salazar from the local parish to bless the supposedly sacrosanct blemish. To Henry, the image is only a water stain.

In addition to dealing with Esperanza, Henry finds himself interacting with Dawn and her taciturn six-year-old daughter Millie, who hasn't spoken a word since her father abandoned the family a year earlier. Dawn becomes convinced of the image's healing powers when Millie begins to talk after touching it. Another disciple is supermarket cashier Patience, who wears thick glasses and discovers her vision is perfect after she too comes in contact with the stain.

When Henry learns that Millie has gone silent after learning of his terminal illness while eavesdropping on his conversation with her mother, he resolves to remove the stain and disabuse the faithful of what he believes to be misplaced belief. Henry destroys the image with an axe and in the process destroys his house. With the structure weakened, a corner of the house collapses on him.

The film ends with Henry recovering in the hospital. Upon awakening in his hospital bed, he is greeted by Esperanza, Dawn and a talking Millie, who inform him that he is no longer ill. Surprised and rejuvenated, he finds himself ready to accept hope and belief and even the possibility of miracles.

== Cast ==
- Luke Wilson as Henry Poole
- Radha Mitchell as Dawn Stupek
- Adriana Barraza as Esperanza Martinez
- George Lopez as Father Salazar
- Cheryl Hines as Meg Wyatt
- Richard Benjamin as Dr. Fancher
- Morgan Lily as Millie Stupek - Age 8
- Rachel Seiferth as Patience
- Beth Grant as Josie

== Production ==
The film was shot on location in La Mirada, California.

The soundtrack includes "Not Dark Yet" by Bob Dylan, "Song 2" by Blur, "Promises" by Badly Drawn Boy and "All roads lead home" by Golden State.

== Reception ==
The film received generally negative reviews. Stephen Holden of The New York Times said the film "traffics in the kind of inspirational kitsch that only a true believer could swallow" and added, "Mr. Wilson offers a credible portrait of an angry, despairing man fending off a cult. But the film’s spiritual deck is stacked. In the mawkish tradition of movies like Simon Birch, Wide Awake, August Rush, and Hearts in Atlantis, Henry Poole Is Here is insufferable hokum that takes itself very, very seriously."

Roger Ebert of the Chicago Sun-Times rated the film 3½ out of four stars and said it "achieves something that is uncommonly difficult. It is a spiritual movie with the power to emotionally touch believers, agnostics and atheists - in that descending order, I suspect. It doesn't say that religious beliefs are real. It simply says that belief is real. And it's a warm-hearted love story . . . I fell for it."

Reyhan Harmanci of the San Francisco Chronicle called it "a strange and thoughtful little movie" and added, "The film manages to be successfully character-driven, but the characters ride on a flimsy plot."

Steve Persall of the St. Petersburg Times graded the film C− and commented, "Henry Poole Is Here is aimed at the Bible bunch, who will be more tolerant of its oversimplification of theological mystery. They'll see Henry as a lost soul resisting Christian power until that becomes impossible, then sing praises when it does. But that doesn't change the fact that Pellington's movie is draggy-dull and a bit annoying with its piety. Hollywood still does sin much better than salvation."

Josh Rosenblatt of the Austin Chronicle rated the film 1½ stars and asserted "good old disturbing Pellington has officially gone soft. Though his latest, Henry Poole Is Here, is full of all his usual ultrastylized, ultradark visual experimentation – an aesthetic that makes viewers feel like they’re drowning in an ocean of uncomfortable childhood memories – its story couldn’t be more corny, redemptive, or inspirational . . . I don’t know if Pellington found religion recently, but I do know you have to wonder about the artistic health and decision-making abilities of any filmmaker who looks for divinity in shots of sunlight pouring out from behind clouds. All that’s missing from the director’s new vision of the world is the pipe organ and the choir of angels."

Robert Koehler of Variety observed, "Because it's billed as a more personal project for Mark Pellington after a string of interesting, idiosyncratic thrillers (Arlington Road, The Mothman Prophecies), Henry Poole Is Here is all the more disappointing. [Its] tendency to lecture on the power of faith and religion and on the demerits of science seems to assume an almost childlike audience that needs to be spoon-fed Pablum. This tale . . . won't advance the profile of the always-likable Luke Wilson, and Christian moviegoers will have to show up in great numbers to keep the film from being doomed to something far less than sleeper status."

Rotten Tomatoes gives the film an approval rating of 39% based on 92 reviews; the average rating is 5.2. The consensus reads: "Full of Hallmark-truisms and pop songs presented with strained significance, this comic foible intends less to convert than to preach to the choir." Metacritic, which uses a weighted average, assigned the film a score of 44 out of 100, based on 25 critics, indicating "mixed or average" reviews.

Adriana Barraza won the Grace Award for Movies for her work on the film at the 2009 Movieguide Awards.

== DVD release ==
Anchor Bay Entertainment released the film on Region 1 DVD on January 20, 2009. Viewers have the option of watching it in fullscreen or anamorphic widescreen format with subtitles in English or Spanish. Bonus features include commentary by director Mark Pellington and screenwriter Albert Torres, The Making of Henry Poole Is Here, and two music videos. The film is available in Christian bookstores, but as a "Family Edited Version".
