= The Power Station Years: The Unreleased Recordings =

The Power Station Years

Compilation album by Jon Bon Jovi
- Released: 1998
- Recorded: 1980–1984
- Studio: Power Station, New York City
- Genre: Rock
- Length: 70:00
- Label: Mercury

Jon Bon Jovi chronology
Destination Anywhere (1997)	The Power Station Years (1998)	At the Starland Ballroom Live (2009)

Professional ratings
Review scores
Source	Rating
AllMusic	3/5 stars
Metal Hammer	1/10

The Power Station Years: The Unreleased Recordings, first released as John Bongiovi: The Power Station Years, is a compilation of previously unreleased songs recorded by vocalist/guitarist Jon Bon Jovi (then known by his given name of John Bongiovi) that was first released as a 10-track compilation in 1998. They were recorded in the early 1980s at The Power Station recording studio, where John worked basically as an intern for his cousin and then owner Toni Bongiovi, helping out running errands, cleaning, etc.

== Recordings ==
The songs were recorded prior to the formation of the now-famous band, Bon Jovi. The album has been reissued several times since in a 14-track version and the latest 20-track edition, released on 18 September 2001. The albums were produced and released by Tony Bongiovi – Jon's father's first cousin. The albums are unofficial and were originally released under the "Masquerade" record label and have been re-released with different packaging on several occasions, including as Hollywood Dreams on 9 July 2018.

"More Than We Bargained For" was released as a promotional single for the album and charted at number 7 on the UK Rock and Metal singles chart.

The song "Bobby's Girl" is about Jon's wife Dorothea Hurley. Dorothea was dating Jon's best friend Bobby at the time Jon and Dorothea first met.

The most notable song on the album is an instrumental version of the song "Runaway" (although it was not available on all releases), which went on to reach number 39 on the Billboard Hot 100 in 1984.

== Track listing ==
=== 1998 version ===
1. "Who Said It Would Last Forever" (Bon Jovi, Jim Polles)
2. "Open Your Heart"
3. "Stringin' a Line" (Ian Thomas)
4. "Don't Leave Me Tonight"
5. "Hollywood Dreams" (Bon Jovi, Polles)
6. "Don't You Believe Him"
7. "More Than We Bargained For" (Bon Jovi, Polles)
8. "Head Over Heels"
9. "What You Want"
10. "Talkin' in Your Sleep" (Bon Jovi, George Karakoglou)

=== 1999 version ===
1. "Who Said It Would Last Forever"
2. "Open Your Heart"
3. "Stringin' a Line"
4. "Don't Leave Me Tonight"
5. "More Than We Bargained For"
6. "For You"
7. "Hollywood Dreams"
8. "All Talk, No Action"
9. "Don't Keep Me Wondering"
10. "Head Over Heels"
11. "No One Does It Like You"
12. "What You Want"
13. "Don't You Believe Him"
14. "Talkin' in Your Sleep"

=== 2001 version ===
1. "Who Said It Would Last Forever" – 4:01
2. "Open Your Heart" – 3:46
3. "Stringin' a Line" – 3:46
4. "Don't Leave Me Tonight" – 4:53
5. "More Than We Bargained For" – 3:49
6. "For You" – 3:04
7. "Hollywood Dreams" – 3:16
8. "All Talk, No Action" – 3:29
9. "Don't Keep Me Wondering" – 2:57
10. "Head Over Heels" – 3:31
11. "No One Does It Like You" – 4:14
12. "What You Want" – 3:32
13. "Don't You Believe Him" – 3:13
14. "Talkin' in Your Sleep" – 4:20
15. "Bobby's Girl" – 1:39
16. "Gimme Some Lovin' Charlene" – 2:29
17. "Don't Do That to Me Anymore" – 3:47
18. "This Woman Is Dangerous" – 4:08
19. "Maybe Tomorrow" – 3:32
20. "Runaway" (instrumental demo) (Bon Jovi, George Karakoglou) – 3:39

== Personnel ==
=== Musicians ===
- Jon Bon Jovi – vocals, guitars, piano, percussion
- Bill Frank – lead guitar
- Jim McGrath – drums
- Charlie Mills – drums
- David Rashbaum – background vocals, keyboards, piano
- Mick Seeley – bass guitar, background vocals
- Rick Cyr – saxophone, organ

=== Production ===
- Tony Bongiovi – producer, original engineering
- Rocco Raffa (AKA Steve Marinaccio) – mixing
- Roy Hendrickson – mixing
- Jason Corsaro – mixing
- Scott Litt – original engineering
- Ron Winter – executive producer (1998)
- Lee Rumble – engineering (1998)
- Prime CDs, London – 1998 mastering
- The Creative Tank – sleeve design

== Charts ==
Chart (1997)	Peak position
UK Rock & Metal Albums (OCC)	6
