= Queen of New Orleans =

1997 single by Jon Bon Jovi

Single by Jon Bon Jovi

from the album Destination Anywhere
- Written: November 1996 (Los Angeles)
- Released: August 18, 1997
- Recorded: December 1996
- Studio: Chapel (Los Angeles)
- Length: 3:54
- Label: Mercury
- Songwriters: Jon Bon Jovi; Dave Stewart
- Producer: Dave Stewart

Jon Bon Jovi singles chronology
"Midnight in Chelsea" (1997)	"Queen of New Orleans" (1997)	"Janie, Don't Take Your Love to Town" (1997)

"Queen of New Orleans" is a song by American rock singer Jon Bon Jovi, released as the second single from his second solo album, Destination Anywhere (1997) in August 1997. The single charted at number 10 on the UK Singles Chart and became a top-40 hit in Australia, Canada, Iceland, Ireland, and the Netherlands. The song features a music video which was released on the DVD Destination Anywhere: The Film.

== Track listings ==
All songs were written by Jon Bon Jovi and Dave Stewart except where noted.

UK and Australian CD1

1. "Queen of New Orleans" (radio edit) – 3:54
2. "Queen of New Orleans" (album version) – 4:32
3. "Every Word Was a Piece of My Heart" (acoustic version) (Bon Jovi) – 4:56
4. "Jailbreak" (live at The Forum, London, June 12, 1997) (Phil Lynott) – 4:55

UK and Australian CD2

1. "Queen of New Orleans" (radio edit) – 3:54
2. "Queen of New Orleans" (album version) – 4:32
3. "Midnight in Chelsea" (live at The Forum, London, June 12, 1997) – 5:34
4. "Destination Anywhere" (live at The Forum, London, June 12, 1997) (Bon Jovi) – 5:24

UK cassette single

1. "Queen of New Orleans" (radio edit) – 3:54
2. "Midnight in Chelsea" (live at The Forum, London, June 12, 1997) – 5:34

European CD single

1. "Queen of New Orleans" (album version) – 4:32
2. "Midnight in Chelsea" (live at The Forum, London, June 12, 1997) – 5:34

== Credits and personnel ==
Credits are lifted from the Destination Anywhere album booklet.

Recording

- Written in Los Angeles in November 1996
- Recorded and produced at Chapel Studios (Los Angeles) in December 1996
- Mixed at Sarm West (London, England) in February 1997
- Mastered at Sterling Sound (New York City)

Personnel

- Jon Bon Jovi – writing, vocals
- Dave Stewart – writing, guitar, production
- Maxayn Lewis – backing vocals
- Alexandra Brown – backing vocals
- Bridgette Bryant – backing vocals
- Hugh McDonald – bass
- Imogen Heap – keyboards
- Kenny Aronoff – drums
- Andy Wright – programming
- Obie O'Brien – mixing, engineering
- Marc Lane – mixing assistance
- Lee Manning – engineering assistance
- Mike Woglom – engineering assistance
- George Marino – mastering

== Charts ==
Chart (1997)	Peak position
Australia (ARIA)	40
Canada Top Singles (RPM)	40
Canada Rock/Alternative (RPM)	18
Europe (Eurochart Hot 100)	32
Germany (GfK)	66
Iceland (Íslenski Listinn Topp 40)	36
Ireland (IRMA)	27
Netherlands (Dutch Top 40)	36
Netherlands (Single Top 100)	40
Scottish Singles Sales (Official Charts)	6
Sweden (Sverigetopplistan)	41
Switzerland (Schweizer Hitparade)	50
UK Singles (Official Charts)	10
UK Rock & Metal (Official Charts)	1
