= Ann Mincieli =

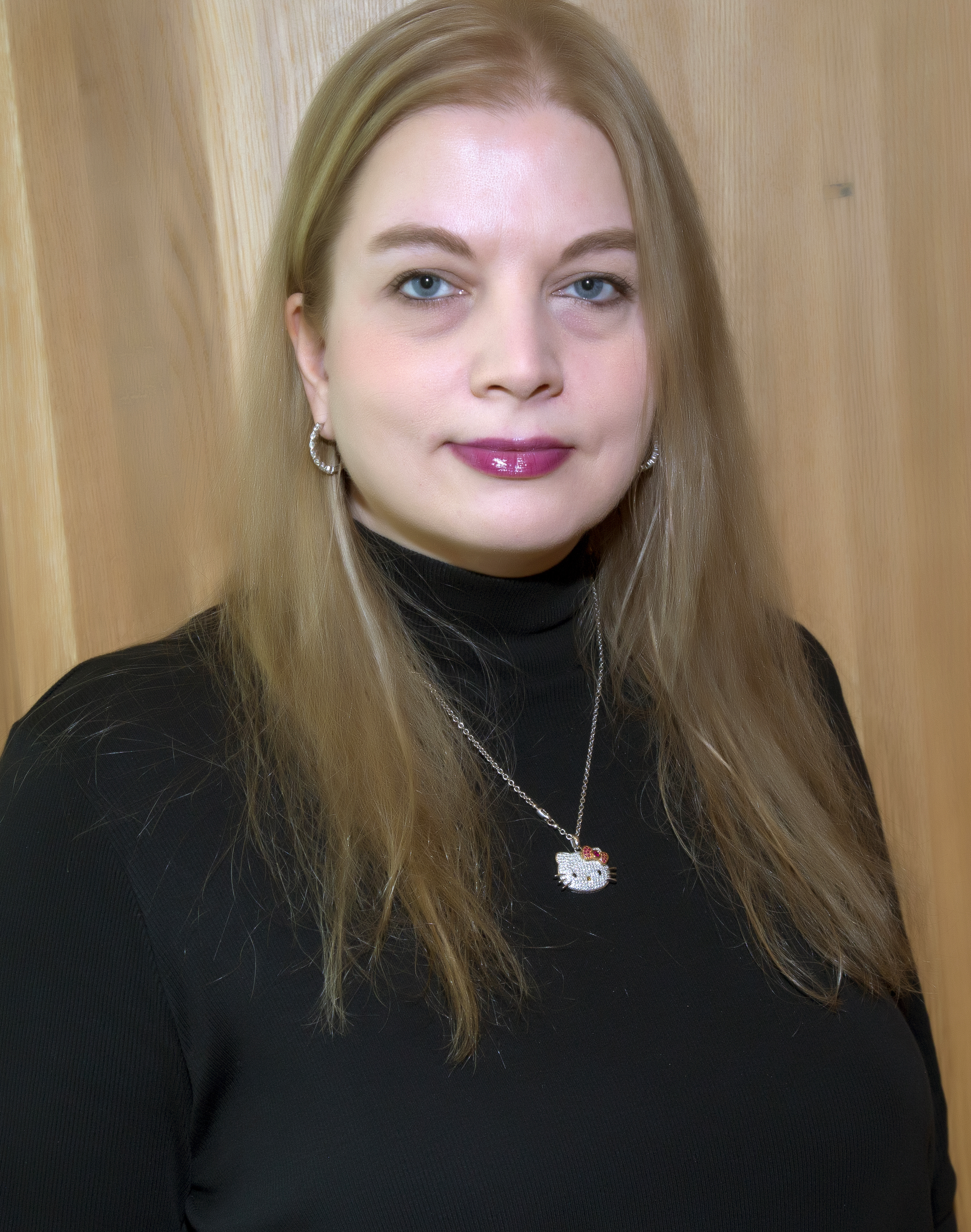

Background information
- Occupations: Mixing engineer; Recording engineer

Ann Mincieli is a recording and mix engineer. She is best known for her work with Alicia Keys. Mincieli has four Grammy Awards and six nominations.

== Work with Alicia Keys ==
Mincieli is co-founder of Jungle City Studios with Alicia Keys. She is a partner with Alicia Keys in She Is the Music, a non-profit organization to increase the number of women in the music industry.
