= Jon Bon Jovi =

American rock singer-songwriter (born 1962)

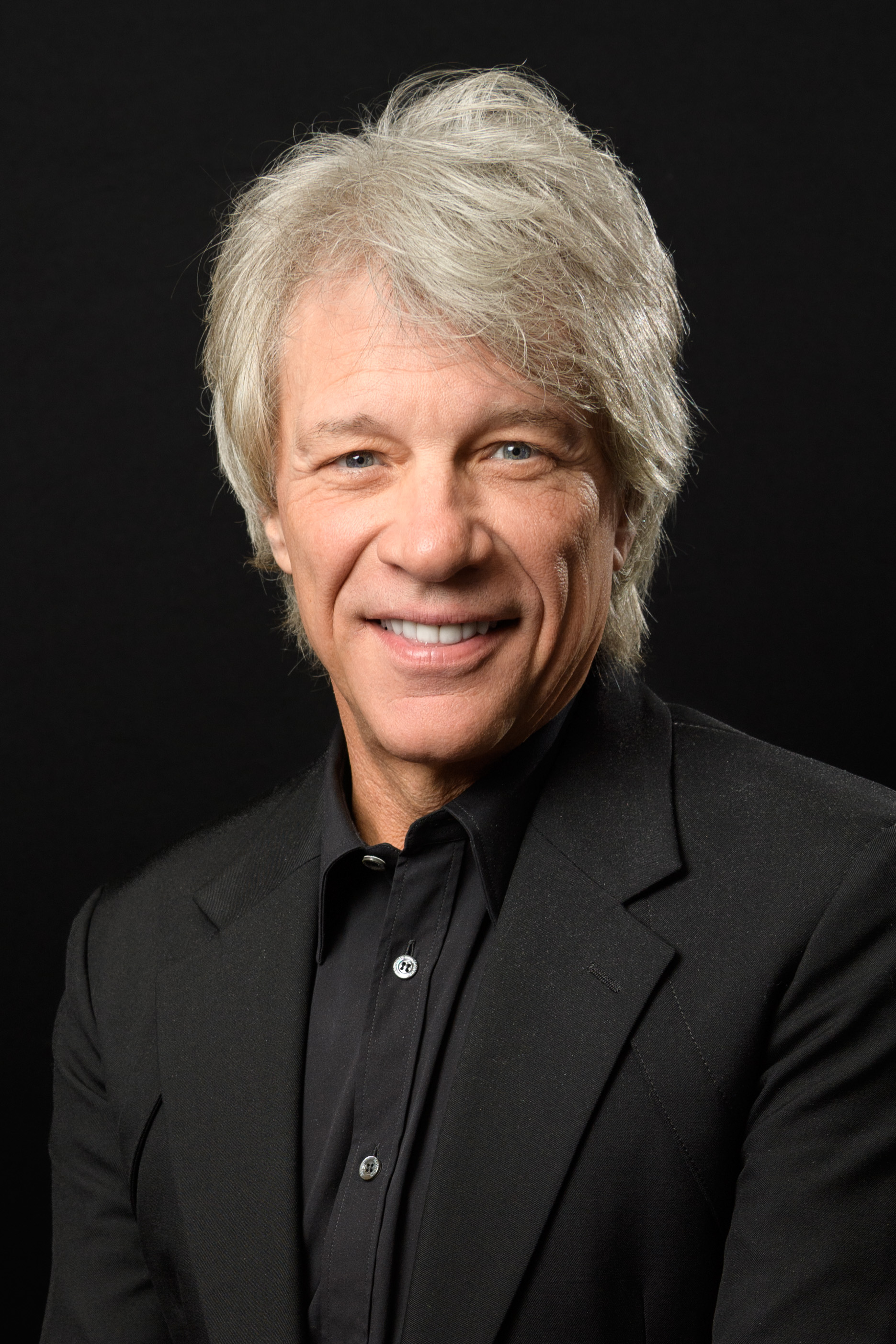
- Bon Jovi in 2024
- Born: John Francis Bongiovi Jr. March 2, 1962 (age 64); Perth Amboy, New Jersey, U.S.
- Occupations: Singer; songwriter; musician; actor
- Years active: 1974–present
- Spouse: Dorothea Hurley (m. 1989)
- Children: 4, including Jake
- Relatives: Tony Bongiovi (cousin); Millie Bobby Brown (daughter-in-law); Nina Yang Bongiovi (sister-in-law)
- Musical career
- Genres: Hard rock; glam metal; arena rock; pop rock; country rock
- Instruments: Vocals; guitar
- Member of: Bon Jovi
- Formerly of: Scandal; Southside Johnny and the Asbury Jukes
- Website: bonjovi.com

John Francis Bongiovi Jr. (born March 2, 1962), known professionally as Jon Bon Jovi, is an American singer, songwriter, guitarist, and actor. He is best known as the founder and frontman of the rock band Bon Jovi, which was formed in 1983. He has released 16 studio albums with his band as well as two solo albums.

In the 1990s, Bon Jovi started an acting career, starring in the films Moonlight and Valentino, The Leading Man, Little City, Homegrown, Pay It Forward, U-571 and Cry Wolf and appearing on television in shows such as Sex and the City, 30 Rock, Ally McBeal, and The West Wing.

Bon Jovi was inducted into the Songwriters Hall of Fame in 2009. In 2012, he ranked number 50 among Billboard magazine's "Power 100", a ranking of "The Most Powerful and Influential People in the Music Business".

Bon Jovi is a founder and former majority owner of an Arena Football League team, the Philadelphia Soul.

== Early life ==
John Francis Bongiovi Jr. was born in Perth Amboy, New Jersey. His father John Francis Bongiovi Sr. (born 1930) was a barber and a former Marine. His mother Carol (née Sharkey; 1940–2024), also a former Marine, was a florist and Playboy Bunny. His father was of Italian and Slovak ancestry: his great grandmother Alžbeta Jacko hailed from Košická Belá in present-day Slovakia and the name Bongiovi comes from Sciacca, Sicily. His mother was of German and Russian descent. In an interview about his family tree, Bon Jovi stated, "I'm not a blood relative of Frank Sinatra, but I've always loved that rumour. Who wouldn't want to be related to the man?"

Bon Jovi was raised Catholic. During the height of Beatlemania, his mother became a fervent admirer of The Beatles and dreamed that her son would achieve similar fame. To instill in him a love of music, she gave him his first guitar at the age of seven. Although Bongiovi received some lessons, he never enjoyed them and eventually abandoned the guitar in the basement. "I liked the sound it made falling down the stairs more than any of those boring lessons," he later stated. He attended St. Joseph High School in Metuchen, New Jersey, during his freshman and sophomore years. He later transferred to Sayreville War Memorial High School in Parlin, New Jersey.

At 15, he attended a Bruce Springsteen concert with his friends, and it was then that he knew what he wanted to do for the rest of his life. He resumed his guitar lessons with a new teacher, Al Parinello, who was very demanding but also instilled in him a passion for music. Jon Bon Jovi later recalled the importance of those lessons and acknowledged that they were one of the best things that had ever happened to him. When Parinello died in 1995, Bon Jovi carved the initials AP into his acoustic guitar in honor of his mentor, something he continued to do for many years.

== Musical career ==
=== Beginnings ===
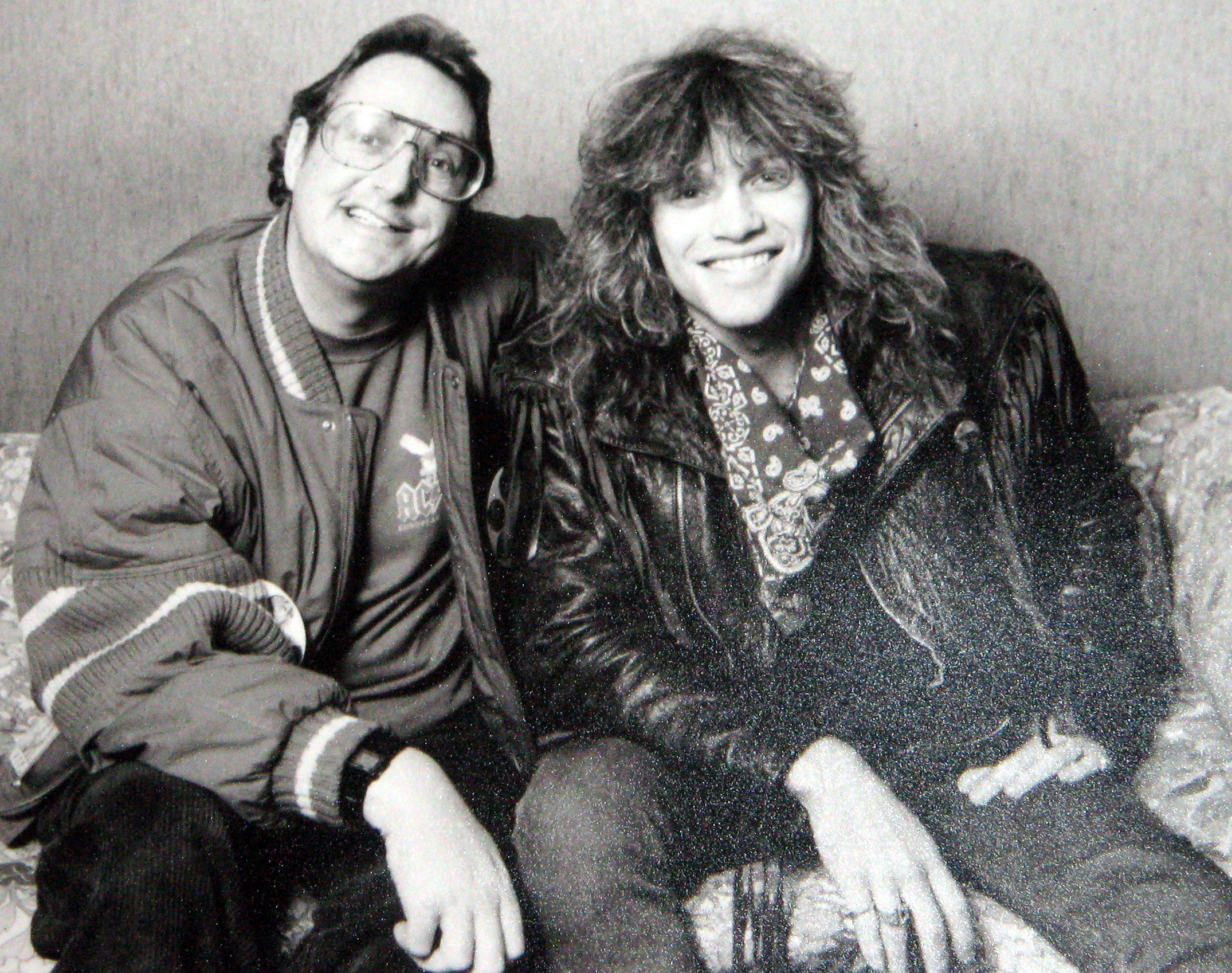
Bon Jovi (right) with Jonathan King in 1987

Jon Bon Jovi began playing music in 1974, when he formed his first band Raze and took part in a talent contest at his school. At 16, he formed a band called Atlantic City Expressway and was joined by David Bryan, who would later become a member of the Bon Jovi band. Still in his teens, Bon Jovi played in the band John Bongiovi and the Wild Ones, performing in clubs such as the Fast Lane and opening for local acts. By 1980, he had formed his first original band, The Rest; the band opened for New Jersey acts such as Southside Johnny and the Asbury Jukes. In late 1979, Jon Bon Jovi joined the band The Rest—founded by guitarist Jack Ponti—with whom he began writing his first songs, including "Shot Through the Heart", which years later would appear on Bon Jovi's debut album. However, after receiving no record offers, Ponti decided to disband the group.

By mid-1980, out of school and working part-time at a women's shoe store, Jon Bon Jovi took a job at the Power Station Studios, a Manhattan recording facility where his cousin Tony Bongiovi was co-owner. One day, he was sweeping the floor as Disco producer Meco was in the studio recording Christmas in the Stars: The Star Wars Christmas Album. Meco suggested that Bon Jovi sing "R2-D2 We Wish You a Merry Christmas", which became his first professional recording (credited as John Bongiovi).

In 1981, Bon Jovi made his television debut with the John Bongiovi Band on The Uncle Floyd Show.

=== Bon Jovi ===
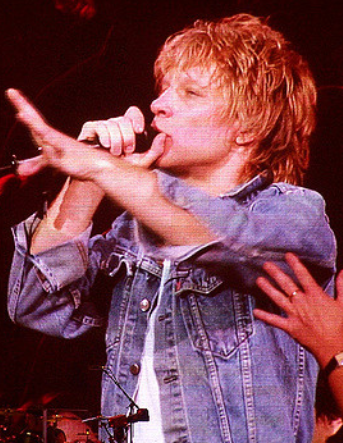
Bon Jovi performing on the Have A Nice Day Tour in 2006

Jon Bon Jovi made several demos – including one produced by Billy Squier – and sent them to record companies, though failing to make an impact. In 1982, Jon recorded "Runaway" in his cousin's studio, backed up by studio musicians. Jon visited a local radio station WAPP 103.5FM "The Apple" in Lake Success, New York, to write and sing the jingles for the station. He spoke with DJ Chip Hobart and to the promotion director, John Lassman, who suggested Jon let WAPP include the song "Runaway" on the station's compilation album of local homegrown talent. Jon was reluctant, but eventually gave them the song, which he had re-recorded in 1982 (following a rough early recording in 1981) with local studio musicians whom he designated The All Star Review – guitarist Tim Pierce, keyboardist Roy Bittan (from Bruce Springsteen's E Street Band), drummer Frankie LaRocka, and bassist Hugh McDonald.

The song began to get airplay in the New York area, then other sister stations in major markets picked up the song. In March 1983, for a short tour supporting "Runaway", Jon Bon Jovi called David Bryan, who in turn called bassist Alec John Such and drummer Tico Torres, both formerly of the band Phantom's Opera. Jon saw and was impressed with hometown guitarist Richie Sambora, who was recommended by Such and Torres. Once the band began playing showcases and opening for local talent, they caught the attention of record executive Derek Shulman, who signed them to Mercury Records and who was part of the PolyGram company. Because Jon Bon Jovi wanted a group name, Pamela Maher, a friend of Richard Fischer and an employee of Doc McGhee, suggested they call themselves Bon Jovi, following the example of the other famous two-word bands such as Van Halen. This name was chosen instead of the original idea of Johnny Electric. Maher's suggestion of the name was met with little enthusiasm, but two years later they hit the charts under that name.

With the help of their new manager Doc McGhee they recorded the band's debut album, Bon Jovi, which was released on January 21, 1984. The album included the band's first hit single, "Runaway", reaching the top forty on the Billboard Hot 100. In 1985, Bon Jovi's second album, 7800° Fahrenheit, was released. The album certified Gold by RIAA. In 1986, the band achieved widespread success and global recognition with its third album, Slippery When Wet, which had sold 30 million copies worldwide. The first two singles from the album, "You Give Love a Bad Name" and "Livin' on a Prayer", both hit number one on the Billboard Hot 100. Its 1988 sequel New Jersey, and 1992's Keep the Faith were all international hits, each selling over ten million copies worldwide. They incorporated elements of soft rock and country, moves that helped them sustain their popularity into the 21st century. As of 2022, Bon Jovi has released 16 studio albums, three compilations and two live albums. The band has sold more than 149 million records worldwide, making it one of the bestselling American rock bands. Bon Jovi has performed more than 3,000 concerts in over 50 countries for more than 35 million fans. Bon Jovi was inducted into the UK Music Hall of Fame in 2006 and into the U.S. Rock and Roll Hall of Fame in 2018.

In July 2026, Bon Jovi played a series of ten performances at Madison Square Garden, dubbed "The Forever Tour." It was his first full concert performance since his vocal cord surgery, and though he had to end one evening's performance early due to strain, overall fans were happy and the concerts were well received. Bruce Springsteen joined him on stage at one of the shows. Fans also had the opportunity to meet Jon Bon Jovi and the band in Proto Hologram form, and get their selfies taken by Jon's hologram—a first in the concert industry.

=== Solo career ===
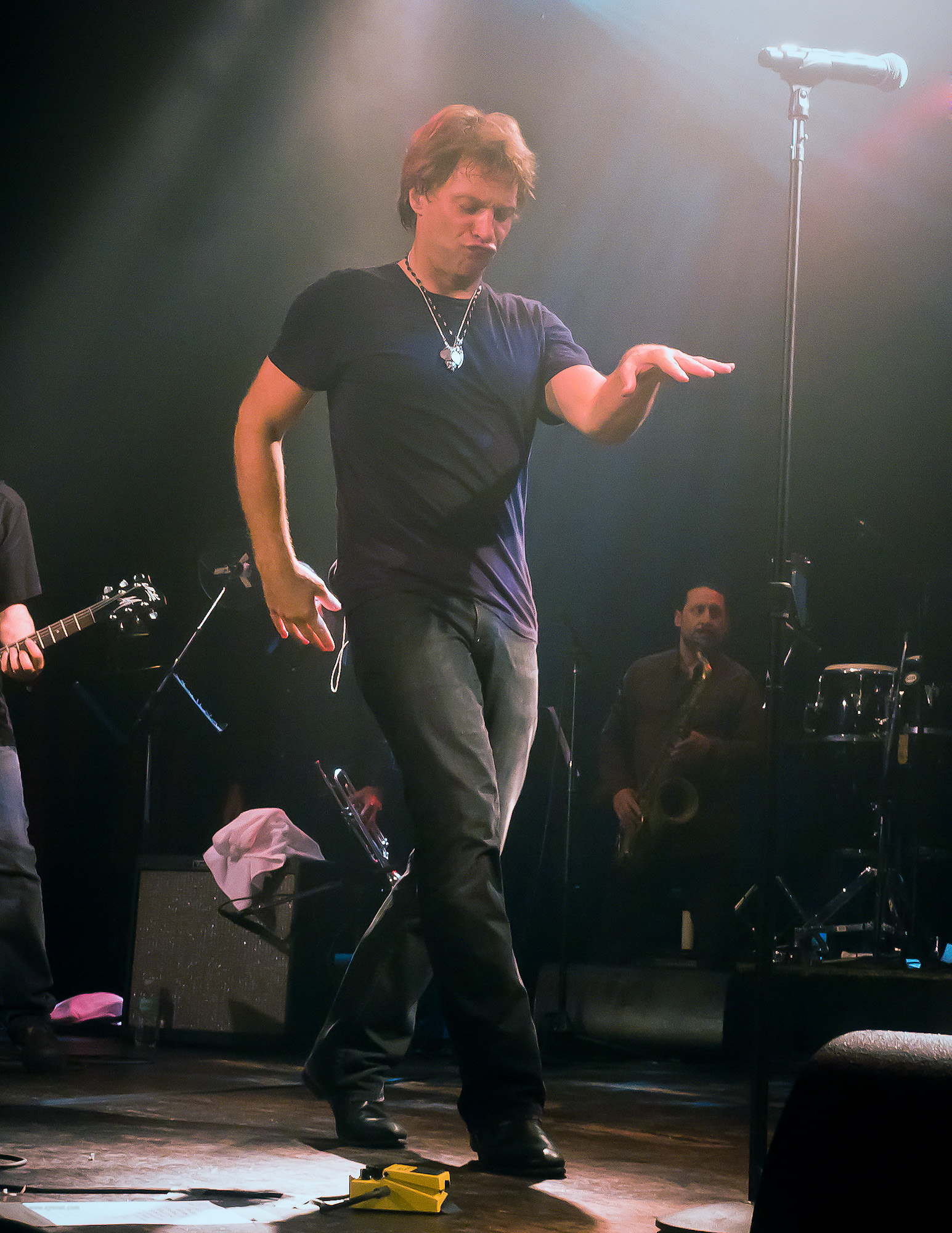
Bon Jovi performing in 2009

The exhaustion of recording Slippery When Wet and New Jersey back to back and going on highly paced world tours took its toll. By the end of the New Jersey tour, the band had 16 months of concerts under its belt. The bandmates were exhausted physically, mentally and emotionally. Following the final tour date in Mexico, and without any clear plans for their future, the members of the band simply went home. The band has since stated that there were few if any goodbyes between them. During the time they took off from the scene, members of the band retreated to their own projects and showed no desire to make another album.

In 1990, Jon Bon Jovi recorded a soundtrack to the movie Young Guns II. The soundtrack is commonly known as Blaze of Glory. Having been originally approached by his friend Emilio Estevez to lend "Wanted Dead or Alive" as the theme song for his upcoming Billy the Kid sequel, Bon Jovi ended up composing an all-new theme song for the film's soundtrack and delivering his first solo album. The album featured guests such as Elton John, Little Richard and Jeff Beck. The title track, "Blaze of Glory", peaked at number one on the Billboard Hot 100. In 1991, "Blaze of Glory" won an award for Favorite Pop/Rock Single at the American Music Awards and won a Golden Globe as well. The song also earned Jon Bon Jovi an Academy Award nomination and a Grammy Award nomination.

In 1991, Jon Bon Jovi started his own label, Jambco Records, and produced Aldo Nova's album Blood on the Bricks and Billy Falcon's album Pretty Blue World. Jon Bon Jovi's second solo album was 1997's Destination Anywhere. A short movie of the same name was based entirely on the songs from the record; it starred Jon Bon Jovi, Demi Moore, Kevin Bacon and Whoopi Goldberg. The film debuted in 1997 on both MTV and VH1. In 2012, Jon Bon Jovi recorded a soundtrack to the movie Stand Up Guys. The soundtrack is commonly known as Not Running Anymore. The song "Not Running Anymore" was nominated for a Golden Globe Award that year.

== Other ventures ==
=== Acting career ===
Jon Bon Jovi is a credited actor in the films Moonlight and Valentino, The Leading Man, Destination Anywhere, Homegrown, Little City, No Looking Back, Row Your Boat, Vampires Los Muertos, U-571, Cry Wolf, National Lampoon's Pucked, and New Year's Eve. He also had a supporting role in the movie Pay It Forward, where he played Helen Hunt's abusive ex-husband. His TV series appearances include Sex and the City, 30 Rock, Las Vegas, The West Wing, and an extended stint on Ally McBeal as a plumber who was Ally's boyfriend for a short period of time. He also had a brief, uncredited role in the 1990 film Young Guns II. On January 24, 2011, it was confirmed that Bon Jovi would be cast in the film New Year's Eve, released later that year, as a successful rock star who is connected with Katherine Heigl's character.

=== Sports franchises ===
In 2004, Bon Jovi became founder and primary owner of the Philadelphia Soul of the Arena Football League. He appeared in several television commercials for the league, typically with John Elway, Hall of Fame quarterback for the Denver Broncos and co-owner of the AFL's Colorado Crush. Bon Jovi is no longer part owner of the Soul. Bon Jovi was also part of a group that tried to purchase the Buffalo Bills when they were up for sale in 2014 but lost to Terry Pegula.

=== JBJ's Nashville ===
On June 8, 2024, Jon Bon Jovi opened a rooftop restaurant and bar in Nashville, Tennessee, located at 405 Broadway. JBJ's is a Bon Jovi and rock music themed restaurant and bar. It hosts live music daily. The restaurant is multi-leveled, with each level having a balcony looking down upon the stage in the center of the venue. The grand opening included a performance by Bon Jovi and the rest of the band, which was their first full band live performance since the end of the 2022 tour. The grand opening was attended by Vince Neil of Mötley Crue, Jeremy and Ajay Popoff from Lit, Big Kenny, Jelly Roll, and Jamie O'Neal, amongst others.

JBJ's also features the first ever permanent installation of a Proto hologram machine in a music venue, which can show Jon Bon Jovi and his band's holograms and "beam in" special guests.

=== Television Appearances ===
On December 3, 2025, Jon Bon Jovi was a co-host of NBC's Christmas in Rockefeller Center where he also performed alongside musical guests Gwen Stefani, Marc Anthony, and Reba McEntire. He performed the song, "Unbroken", which explores the struggles of war veterans coping with PTSD and the healing presence of service animals.

== Philanthropy ==
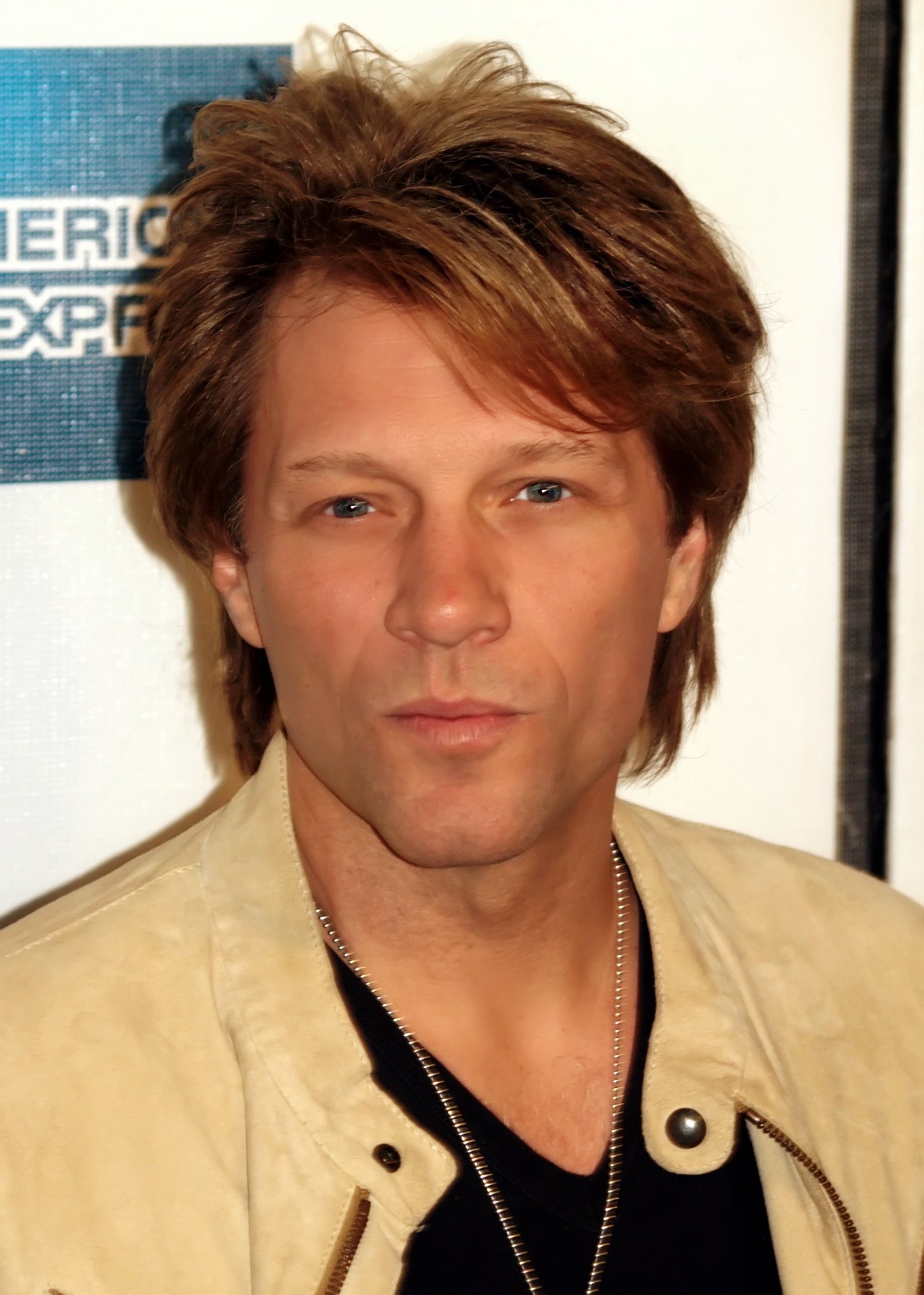
Bon Jovi in April 2009

During an appearance on The Oprah Winfrey Show in 2005, Bon Jovi (the band, not the individual) donated $1 million to the Angel Network foundation.

In July 2007, Jon Bon Jovi announced a project that would rehabilitate a block of 15 homes in North Philadelphia.

The Jon Bon Jovi Soul Foundation (formerly the Philadelphia Soul Charitable Foundation) was founded in 2006. It supports community efforts to break the cycle of poverty and homelessness. On October 19, 2011, it opened the JBJ Soul Kitchen, a community restaurant in Red Bank, New Jersey, where patrons pay what they can afford for their meals, either with money or by volunteering work. As of 2023, three additional locations have been opened—one in Toms River, another at the Newark campus of Rutgers University, and a third one inside the Gilligan Student Union at New Jersey City University. In 2025, Mayor Dan Rodrick of Toms River, New Jersey, accused the organization of attracting homeless people from other parts of the country to congregate in the town.

Jon Bon Jovi is one of 21 artists singing on "Everybody Hurts", a charity single organized by Simon Cowell aiding victims of the 2010 Haiti earthquake.

== Activism ==
During the 2004 presidential campaign, Jon Bon Jovi toured extensively on behalf of presidential candidate John Kerry, appearing at and playing acoustic sets with Richie Sambora at rallies for the Kerry-Edwards ticket throughout the U.S. In 2009, he played at a Manhattan fundraiser for former Secretary of State and 2016 presidential Democratic nominee Hillary Clinton to lessen some of her $6.3 million 2008 presidential campaign debt. On January 18, 2009, Bon Jovi performed a duet at Barack Obama's inauguration concert, performing the Sam Cooke song "A Change is Gonna Come" with Bettye LaVette. On June 4, 2009, Bon Jovi performed an acoustic benefit show for Democratic New Jersey Governor Jon Corzine at the NJPAC in Newark, New Jersey.

On June 24, 2009, Bon Jovi, Sambora and Andy Madadian recorded a musical message of worldwide solidarity with the people of Iran. The handwritten Persian sign in the video translates to "we are one".

On December 15, 2010, Bon Jovi was appointed by then U.S. president Barack Obama to the White House Council for Community Solutions.

In 2017, Bon Jovi raised money for Jim Renacci, a Republican representative from Ohio's 16th congressional district and then a potential candidate for Ohio governor with whom he had had common business interests several years prior.

In the 2020 Democratic Party presidential primaries, Bon Jovi endorsed fellow New Jersey resident Cory Booker for President of the United States.

On October 24, 2020, Bon Jovi performed at a drive-in event for Joe Biden at Dallas High School in Dallas, Pennsylvania.

On January 20, 2021, Bon Jovi and the Kings of Suburbia performed a cover of the Beatles' song "Here Comes the Sun" as part of the "Celebrating America" Inauguration of Joe Biden event.

During the 2024 United States presidential election, Bon Jovi endorsed Kamala Harris

On October 18, 2025, Bon Jovi participated in a No Kings protest in New Jersey, holding a sign that read "No Kings. No Tyrants. No Sycophants. No Trump."

== Personal life ==
Bon Jovi married his high school girlfriend Dorothea Hurley at Graceland Wedding Chapel in Las Vegas on April 29, 1989, with the two having secretly traveled there during a stop in Los Angeles on his band's New Jersey Syndicate Tour. Together, they have a daughter named Stephanie (born 1993) and three sons named Jesse (born 1995), Jake (born 2002), and Romeo (born 2004). Bon Jovi is the father-in-law of English actress Millie Bobby Brown, who married Jake in 2024, and he became a grandfather when the couple adopted a daughter in 2025.

A former resident of Rumson, New Jersey, Bon Jovi established his Sanctuary Sound recording studio in the basement of his home there. He has described himself as a recovering Catholic. He is a close friend of New England Patriots owner Robert Kraft and former head coach Bill Belichick. He owns two Super Bowl rings from the Patriots and has performed several times at the Patriots' home field Gillette Stadium.

In 2019, Bon Jovi received an honorary Doctor of Music degree from University of Pennsylvania and a second honorary doctorate from Princeton University in 2021, recognizing his contributions in music and social welfare.

In October 2021, Bon Jovi tested positive for COVID-19 at a fan event in Florida, and was reported to have shown no symptoms as he was fully vaccinated and felt "great". He had recovered by November 12. In April 2022, he spoke about how the experience had affected him and his songwriting, saying that it made him realize "how volatile we are and how fragile life is". He said, "It didn't matter if you were young or old, American or Egyptian, no matter who you were or where you were from, the COVID-19 pandemic affected you. I was aware of that when I was writing the record."

In February 2024, Bon Jovi revealed he had been struggling with vocal cord issues and underwent reconstructive surgery of the vocal cords in June 2022, a procedure known as vocal cord medialization. He had extensive daily vocal rehabilitation for nearly two years to regain his singing voice. In an October 2025 interview with People, he said that one of his vocal cords was atrophying and that he was trying multiple approaches for recovery. His treating surgeon was Robert Sataloff of Philadelphia.

In September 2024, during a break from shooting a music video on the John Seigenthaler Pedestrian Bridge in Nashville, Bon Jovi noticed a woman preparing to jump from the bridge and persuaded her to climb back over the railing. He was thanked by Nashville police and security camera footage of the incident was released by CNN.

In June 2026, Bon Jovi played his first public performances in New Jersey since 2018, at the all-star concerts commemorating the opening of the Bruce Springsteen Center for American Music at Monmouth University.

== Discography ==
=== Studio albums ===
- Blaze of Glory (1990)
- Destination Anywhere (1997)

=== Live albums ===
- At the Starland Ballroom Live (2009)

=== Compilation albums ===
- The Power Station Years: The Unreleased Recordings (1998)

== Filmography ==
=== Films ===
Year	Title	Role	Notes
1990	Young Guns II	Prison scene bandit (uncredited)	
1995	Moonlight and Valentino	The Painter	
1996	The Leading Man	Robin Grange	
1997	Little City	Kevin	
1997	Destination Anywhere: The Film	Jon	
1998	No Looking Back	Michael	
1998	Homegrown	Danny	
1998	Row Your Boat	Jamey Meadows	
2000	U-571	Lieutenant Pete Emmett	
2000	Pay It Forward	Ricky McKinney	
2002	Vampires: Los Muertos	Derek Bliss	
2005	Cry Wolf	Rich Walker	
2006	National Lampoon's Pucked	Frank Hopper	
2011	New Year's Eve	Daniel Jensen	
2024	Avicii – I'm Tim	Himself	Documentary

=== Television ===
Year	Title	Role	Notes
1997	Malhação	Himself	Season 3; 3 Episodes
1999	Sex and the City	Seth	Episode: "Games People Play"
2002	Ally McBeal	Victor Morrison	10 episodes
2005	Las Vegas	Himself	Episode: "Centennial"
2006	The West Wing	Himself	Episode: "Welcome to Wherever You Are"
2010	30 Rock	Himself	Episode: "Anna Howard Shaw Day"
