= List of songs recorded by Bon Jovi =

This is a comprehensive list of Bon Jovi songs that have been officially released. The list includes songs that have been performed by the entire band. Solo projects by band members are listed separately. The list consists of mostly studio recordings; remixes and live recordings are not listed, unless the song has only been released in one of the two formats. Singles are listed as having been released on their respective album, unless the single has no associated album. Only one release is listed per song, unless the song was featured on multiple releases at the same time.

Song	Release	Producer	Notes
"99 in the Shade"	New Jersey	Bruce Fairbairn	
"Ain't No Cure For Love"	non-album release		B-Side of Say It Isn't So
"Alive"	non-album release		B-Side of All About Lovin' You
"All About Lovin' You"	Bounce	Jon Bon Jovi, Richie Sambora, Luke Ebbin	
"All Hail the King"	This House Is Not for Sale		Bonus Track
"All I Wanna Do is You"	100,000,000 Bon Jovi Fans Can't Be Wrong	Jon Bon Jovi, Dave A. Stewart	
"All I Want is Everything"	These Days	Peter Collins, Jon Bon Jovi, Richie Sambora	Bonus track
"Always"	Cross Road	Peter Collins	
"Always Run to You"	7800° Fahrenheit	Lance Quinn	
"Amen"	What About Now	John Shanks	
"American Reckoning"	2020	John Shanks, Jon Bon Jovi	
"Another Reason to Believe"	100,000,000 Bon Jovi Fans Can't Be Wrong	Jon Bon Jovi, Richie Sambora, Luke Ebbin	
"Any Other Day"	Lost Highway	Dann Huff	
"Army of One"	What About Now	John Shanks	
"A Teardrop to the Sea"	Burning Bridges	John Shanks	
"Backdoor to Heaven"	New Jersey		Demo. Released in 2014 as "Deluxe Edition"
"Bad Medicine"	New Jersey	Bruce Fairbairn	
"Beautiful Drug"	2020	John Shanks, Jon Bon Jovi	
"Beautiful World"	What About Now	John Shanks	
"Because We Can"	What About Now	John Shanks	
"Bed of Roses"	Keep the Faith	Bob Rock	
"Bells of Freedom"	Have a Nice Day	Jon Bon Jovi, Richie Sambora, John Shanks	
"Billy"	100,000,000 Bon Jovi Fans Can't Be Wrong		
"Bitter Wine"	These Days	Peter Collins, Jon Bon Jovi, Richie Sambora	Bonus track
"Blame It on the Love of Rock & Roll"	Keep the Faith	Bob Rock	
"Blind Love"	Burning Bridges	John Shanks	
"Blood in the Water"	2020	John Shanks, Jon Bon Jovi	
"Blood on Blood"	New Jersey	Bruce Fairbairn	
"Borderline"	non-album release	Bruce Fairbairn	Originally released as a b-side on the single You Give Love A Bad Name in July 1986. Also appeared on the Japanese EP Borderline released in November 1986 and as bonus track on the Japanese 2-CD edition of Slippery When Wet released in 1998.
"Born Again Tomorrow"	This House Is Not for Sale		
"Born to Be My Baby"	New Jersey	Bruce Fairbairn	
"Bounce"	Bounce	Jon Bon Jovi, Richie Sambora, Luke Ebbin	
"Breakout"	Bon Jovi	Tony Bongiovi, Lance Quinn	
"Breathe"	100,000,000 Bon Jovi Fans Can't Be Wrong	Jon Bon Jovi, Richie Sambora, Luke Ebbin	
"Brokenpromiseland"	The Circle	John Shanks	
"Brothers in Arms"	2020	John Shanks, Jon Bon Jovi	
"Bullet"	The Circle	John Shanks	
"Burning Bridges"	Burning Bridges	John Shanks	
"Burning for Love"	Bon Jovi	Tony Bongiovi, Lance Quinn	
"Cama de Rosas"	Keep the Faith	Bob Rock	Spanish version of "Bed of Roses". Appears on some Latin American releases of "Keep the Faith".
"Captain Crash and the Beauty Queen from Mars"	Crush	Jon Bon Jovi, Richie Sambora, Luke Ebbin	
"Christmas Isn't Christmas"	non-album release	John Shanks	
"Color Me In"	This House Is Not for Sale		TIDAL-exclusive Bonus Track
"Come Back"	Bon Jovi	Tony Bongiovi, Lance Quinn	
"Come on Up to Our House"	This House Is Not for Sale		
"Complicated"	Have a Nice Day	Jon Bon Jovi, Richie Sambora, John Shanks	
"Como Yo Nadie Te Ha Amado"	These Days	Peter Collins, Jon Bon Jovi, Richie Sambora	Spanish version of "This Ain't a Love Song". Appears on some Latin American releases of "These Days".
"Crazy Love"	100,000,000 Bon Jovi Fans Can't Be Wrong		
"Damned"	These Days	Peter Collins, Jon Bon Jovi, Richie Sambora	
"Diamond Ring"	These Days	Peter Collins, Jon Bon Jovi, Richie Sambora	
"Dirty Little Secret"	Have a Nice Day	Jon Bon Jovi, Richie Sambora, John Shanks	Bonus track on Japanese, British, and Australian editions
"Do What You Can"	2020	John Shanks, Jon Bon Jovi	Alternate version featuring Jennifer Nettles on deluxe edition
"Does Anybody Really Fall in Love Anymore?"	New Jersey		Demo. Released in 2014 as "Deluxe Edition"
"Dry County"	Keep the Faith	Bob Rock	
"Edge of a Broken Heart"	Slippery When Wet	Bruce Fairbairn	Originally released on the OST of the film Disorderlies. Also available as bonus track on the Japanese 2-CD edition of Slippery When Wet released in 1998. Appeared on the box set 100,000,000 Bon Jovi Fans Can't Be Wrong and the 2-CD edition of Cross Road too.
"Every Beat of My Heart"	100,000,000 Bon Jovi Fans Can't Be Wrong	Bob Rock	
"Everybody's Broken"	Lost Highway	John Shanks	
"Everyday"	Bounce		
"Fast Cars"	The Circle		
"Fear"	Keep the Faith		
"Fields of Fire"	100,000,000 Bon Jovi Fans Can't Be Wrong		Japanese Bonus Track. Also Released on These Days European 2 Disc Special Edition.
"Fingerprints"	Burning Bridges	John Shanks	
"Flesh and Bone"	100,000,000 Bon Jovi Fans Can't Be Wrong		
"Full Moon High"	New Jersey		Demo. Released in 2014 as "Deluxe Edition"
"Garageland"	100,000,000 Bon Jovi Fans Can't Be Wrong		
"Get Ready"	Bon Jovi	Tony Bongiovi, Lance Quinn	
"God Bless This Mess"	This House Is Not for Sale		
"Good Guys Don't Always Wear White"	100,000,000 Bon Jovi Fans Can't Be Wrong		Originally appears on The Cowboy Way soundtrack.
"Goodnight New York"	This House Is Not for Sale		Bonus Track on International Editions
"Gotta Have a Reason"	100,000,000 Bon Jovi Fans Can't Be Wrong		
"Growin' Up the Hard Way"	New Jersey		Demo. Released in 2014 as "Deluxe Edition"
"Happy Now"	The Circle		
"Have a Nice Day"	Have a Nice Day		
"Hearts Breaking Even"	These Days		
"Hey God"	These Days		
"Hollow Man"	Forever	John Shanks, Jon Bon Jovi	
"Homebound Train"	New Jersey	Bruce Fairbairn	
"Hook Me Up"	Bounce		
"Hush"	100,000,000 Bon Jovi Fans Can't Be Wrong		Also a B-Side of It's My Life
"I Am"	Have a Nice Day		
"I Believe"	Keep the Faith		
"I Could Make a Living Out of Lovin' You"	Crush		Demo & Bonus Track
"I'd Die For You"	Slippery When Wet	Bruce Fairbairn	
"I Don't Want to Live Forever"	non-album release		B-Side of It's My Life
"(I Don't Wanna Fall) To the Fire"	7800° Fahrenheit	Lance Quinn	
"If I Can't Have Your Love"	100,000,000 Bon Jovi Fans Can't Be Wrong		
"If I Was Your Mother"	Keep the Faith		
"If That's What It takes"	These Days		
"I Get a Rush"	100,000,000 Bon Jovi Fans Can't Be Wrong		
"I Got the Girl"	Crush		
"I Just Want to Be Your Man"	100,000,000 Bon Jovi Fans Can't Be Wrong		
"I'll Be There For You"	New Jersey	Bruce Fairbairn	
"I'll Sleep When I'm Dead"	Keep the Faith		
"I Love This Town"	Lost Highway		
"I'm With You"	What About Now		
"I'm Your Man"	Burning Bridges	John Shanks	
"In and Out of Love"	7800° Fahrenheit	Lance Quinn	
"In These Arms"	Keep the Faith		
"Into the Echo"	What About Now		Bonus Track on the Deluxe Edition and the Japanese Edition
"(It's Hard) Letting You Go"	These Days		
"It's My Life"	Crush		
"I Want To Be Loved"	Have a Nice Day		
"I Want You"	Keep the Faith		
"I Will Drive You Home"	This House Is Not for Sale		Bonus Track on International Editions
"I Wish Everyday Could Be Like Christmas"	non-album release		B-Side of Keep the Faith
"I Wrote You a Song"	Forever	John Shanks, Jon Bon Jovi	
"Joey"	Bounce		
"Judgement Day"	New Jersey		Demo. Released in 2014 as "Deluxe Edition"
"Just Older"	Crush		
"Keep the Faith"	Keep the Faith		
"Kidnap an Angel"	100,000,000 Bon Jovi Fans Can't Be Wrong		
"King of the Mountain"	7800° Fahrenheit	Lance Quinn	
"Kiss the Bride"	Forever	John Shanks, Jon Bon Jovi	
"Knockout"	This House Is Not for Sale		
"Labor of Love"	This House Is Not for Sale		
"Last Chance Train"	100,000,000 Bon Jovi Fans Can't Be Wrong		
"Last Cigarette"	Have a Nice Day		
"Last Man Standing"	Have a Nice Day		
"Lay Your Hands on Me"	New Jersey	Bruce Fairbairn	
"Learn to Love"	The Circle		
"Legendary"	Forever	John Shanks, Jon Bon Jovi	
"Let It Rain"	2020	John Shanks, Jon Bon Jovi	
"Let It Rock"	Slippery When Wet	Bruce Fairbairn	
"Let's Make it Baby"	New Jersey		Demo. Released in 2014 as "Deluxe Edition"
"Letter to a Friend"	100,000,000 Bon Jovi Fans Can't Be Wrong		
"Lie to Me"	These Days		
"Life is Beautiful"	Burning Bridges	John Shanks	
"Limitless"	2020	John Shanks, Jon Bon Jovi	
"Little Bit of Soul"	Keep the Faith		
"Live Before You Die"	The Circle		
"Living in Paradise"	Forever	Joel Rubel, John Shanks, Jon Bon Jovi	
"Living in Sin"	New Jersey	Bruce Fairbairn	
"Living Proof"	Forever	John Shanks, Jon Bon Jovi	
"Living With the Ghost"	This House Is Not for Sale		
"Livin' On A Prayer"	Slippery When Wet	Bruce Fairbairn	
"Lonely"	Lost Highway		Bonus track on Japanese, British, and Australian editions
"Lonely at the Top"	These Days		Only available on the French 2-CD edition. Also a B-side of the single This Ain't A Love Song. Shorter remixed version appears on the box set 100,000,000 Bon Jovi Fans Can't Be Wrong.
"Lost Highway"	Lost Highway		
"Love Ain't Nothing But a Four Letter Word"	100,000,000 Bon Jovi Fans Can't Be Wrong		
"Love for Sale"	New Jersey	Bruce Fairbairn	
"Love Hurts"	New Jersey		Demo. Released in 2014 as "Deluxe Edition"
"Love Lies"	Bon Jovi	Tony Bongiovi, Lance Quinn	
"Love is War"	New Jersey	Bruce Fairbairn	B-side of Living in Sin. Released in 2014 as "Deluxe Edition"
"Love Me Back to Life"	Bounce		
"Love's the Only Rule"	The Circle		
"Lower the Flag"	2020	John Shanks, Jon Bon Jovi	
"Lucky"	non-album release		B-Side of Everyday
"Luv Can"	2020	John Shanks, Jon Bon Jovi	Bonus track
"Maybe Someday"	100,000,000 Bon Jovi Fans Can't Be Wrong		
"Memphis Lives in Me"	100,000,000 Bon Jovi Fans Can't Be Wrong		
"Miss Fourth of July"	100,000,000 Bon Jovi Fans Can't Be Wrong		
"Misunderstood"	Bounce		
"My First Guitar"	Forever	John Shanks, Jon Bon Jovi	
"My Guitar Lies Bleeding in My Arms"	These Days		
"Mystery Train"	Crush		
"Neurotica"	Crush		Bonus Track in Australia and Japan
"Never Say Goodbye"	Slippery When Wet	Bruce Fairbairn	
"New Year's Day"	This House Is Not for Sale		
"Next 100 Years"	Crush		Recorded first in 1999 by Johnny & Associates's special unit called J-Friends as part of the relief efforts for the 1995 Great Hanshin earthquake, with Japanese lyrics by B'z's Koshi Inaba.
"No Apologies"	Greatest Hits		
"Nobody's Hero"	100,000,000 Bon Jovi Fans Can't Be Wrong		
"No Regrets"	Bounce		Bonus Track in Japan
"Novocaine"	Have a Nice Day		
"Now and Forever"	New Jersey		Demo. Released in 2014 as "Deluxe Edition"
"One Step Closer"	Lost Highway		
"One Wild Night"	Crush		
"Only in My Dreams"	100,000,000 Bon Jovi Fans Can't Be Wrong		
"Only Lonely"	7800° Fahrenheit	Lance Quinn	
"Open All Night"	Bounce		
"Open All Night (#2)"	100,000,000 Bon Jovi Fans Can't Be Wrong		Not the same song from Bounce
"Ordinary People"	100,000,000 Bon Jovi Fans Can't Be Wrong		Also a B-Side of Say It Isn't So
"Outlaws of Love"	100,000,000 Bon Jovi Fans Can't Be Wrong		
"Out of Bounds"	100,000,000 Bon Jovi Fans Can't Be Wrong		
"Pictures of You"	What About Now		
"Postcards from the Wasteland"	Bounce		Bonus Track in Japan
"Prostitute"	These Days		Only available on the French 2-CD edition. Also a B-side of the single This Ain't A Love Song.
"Put the Boy Back in Cowboy"	Lost Highway		Bonus track on Japanese, British, and Australian editions
"Raise Your Hands"	Slippery When Wet	Bruce Fairbairn	
"Real Life"	100,000,000 Bon Jovi Fans Can't Be Wrong		Originally appears on the EDtv soundtrack.
"Real Love"	This House Is Not for Sale		Bonus Track
"Reunion"	This House Is Not for Sale		
"Rich Man Living in a Poor Man's House"	100,000,000 Bon Jovi Fans Can't Be Wrong		
"Ride Cowboy Ride"	New Jersey	Bruce Fairbairn	
"Right Side of Wrong"	Bounce		
"Roller Coaster"	This House Is Not for Sale		
"Room at the End of the World"	What About Now		
"Roulette"	Bon Jovi	Tony Bongiovi, Lance Quinn	
"Runaway"	Bon Jovi	Tony Bongiovi, Lance Quinn	
"Satellite"	100,000,000 Bon Jovi Fans Can't Be Wrong		
"Saturday Night Gave Me Sunday Morning"	Burning Bridges	John Shanks	
"Save a Prayer"	Keep the Faith		Bonus Track in Japan and Europe
"Save the World"	Crush		
"Say It Isn't So"	Crush		
"Scars on This Guitar"	This House Is Not for Sale		
"Seat Next to You"	Lost Highway		
"Secret Dreams"	7800° Fahrenheit	Lance Quinn	
"Seeds"	Forever	John Shanks, Jon Bon Jovi	
"She Don't Know Me"	Bon Jovi	Tony Bongiovi, Lance Quinn	
"She's a Mystery"	Crush		
"Shine"	2020	John Shanks, Jon Bon Jovi	Bonus track
"Shot Through the Heart"	Bon Jovi	Tony Bongiovi, Lance Quinn	
"Shut Up and Kiss Me"	100,000,000 Bon Jovi Fans Can't Be Wrong		
"Silent Night"	7800° Fahrenheit	Lance Quinn	
"Social Disease"	Slippery When Wet	Bruce Fairbairn	
"Someday I'll Be Saturday Night"	Cross Road	Peter Collins	
"Someday Just Might Be Tonight"	100,000,000 Bon Jovi Fans Can't Be Wrong		
"Something for the Pain"	These Days		
"Something to Believe In"	These Days		
"Standing"	non-album release		B-Side of Everyday
"Starting All Over Again"	Keep the Faith		Japanese bonus track. A different version appears on the box set 100,000,000 Bon Jovi Fans Can't Be Wrong.
"Stay"	non-album release		B-Side of Say It Isn't So
"Stick to Your Guns"	New Jersey	Bruce Fairbairn	
"Story of Love"	2020	John Shanks, Jon Bon Jovi	
"Story of My Life"	Have a Nice Day		
"Summertime"	Lost Highway		
"Superman Tonight"	The Circle		
"Take Back the Night"	Burning Bridges	John Shanks	Bonus track on Japanese and US Target editions
"Taking it Back"	100,000,000 Bon Jovi Fans Can't Be Wrong		
"Temptation"	100,000,000 Bon Jovi Fans Can't Be Wrong		
"Thank You for Loving Me"	Crush		
"That's What the Water Made Me"	What About Now		
"The Devil's in the Temple"	This House Is Not for Sale		
"The Distance"	Bounce	Patrick Leonard, Jon Bon Jovi, Richie Sambora	
"The End"	These Days		Only available on the French 2-CD edition. Also a B-side of the single This Ain't A Love Song. Appears on the box set 100,000,000 Bon Jovi Fans Can't Be Wrong.
"The Fighter"	What About Now		
"The Fire Inside"	100,000,000 Bon Jovi Fans Can't Be Wrong		
"The Hardest Part Is the Night"	7800° Fahrenheit	Lance Quinn	
"The Last Night"	Lost Highway		
"The More Things Change"	Greatest Hits		
"The One That Got Away"	100,000,000 Bon Jovi Fans Can't Be Wrong		
"The People's House"	Forever	John Shanks, Jon Bon Jovi	
"The Price of Love"	7800° Fahrenheit	Lance Quinn	
"The Radio Saved My Life Tonight"	100,000,000 Bon Jovi Fans Can't Be Wrong		
"These Arms Are Open All Night"	100,000,000 Bon Jovi Fans Can't Be Wrong		
"These Days"	These Days		
"These Open Arms"	Have a Nice Day		Bonus track on Japanese edition
"Thick as Thieves"	What About Now		
"Thief of Hearts"	100,000,000 Bon Jovi Fans Can't Be Wrong		
"This Ain't a Love Song"	These Days		
"This House Is Not for Sale"	This House Is Not for Sale		
"This is Love, This is Life"	Greatest Hits		
"This is Our House"	Greatest Hits		
"Thorn in My Side"	The Circle		
"Till We Ain't Strangers Anymore"	Lost Highway		Featuring LeAnn Rimes
"Tokyo Road"	7800° Fahrenheit	Lance Quinn	
"Too Much of a Good Thing"	100,000,000 Bon Jovi Fans Can't Be Wrong		
"Touch of Grey"	This House Is Not for Sale		Bonus Track on German and Japanese Editions
"Two Story Town"	Crush		
"Unbreakable"	Have a Nice Day		Bonus track on Japanese, British, and Australian editions
"Unbroken"	2020	John Shanks, Jon Bon Jovi	
"Undivided"	Bounce		
"Walk Like a Man"	Lost Highway		Bonus track on US Target edition
"Walls"	This House Is Not for Sale		
"Walls of Jericho"	Forever	John Shanks, Jon Bon Jovi	
"Wanted Dead or Alive"	Slippery When Wet	Bruce Fairbairn	
"Waves"	Forever	John Shanks, Jon Bon Jovi	
"We All Fall Down"	Burning Bridges	John Shanks	
"We Can Dance"	non-album release		B-Side of Everyday
"Wedding Day"	non-album release		B-side of the single This Ain't a Love Song. Also released as promo single in the German warehouse Karstadt as giveaway for buying These Days.
"We Don't Run"	Burning Bridges	John Shanks	Also appears as a bonus track on This House Is Not for Sale
"We Got It Going On"	Lost Highway		Featuring Big & Rich
"Welcome to the Good Times"	non-album release		B-Side of Say It Isn't So
"Welcome to Wherever You Are"	Have a Nice Day		
"We Made It Look Easy"	Forever	John Shanks, Jon Bon Jovi	
"We Rule The Night"	100,000,000 Bon Jovi Fans Can't Be Wrong		
"We Weren't Born to Follow"	The Circle		
"What About Now"	What About Now		
"What Do You Got?"	Greatest Hits		
"What's Left of Me"	What About Now		
"When She Comes"	These Days		Only available on the French 2-CD edition. Also a B-side of the single This Ain't A Love Song.
"When We Were Beautiful"	The Circle		
"When We Were Us"	This House Is Not for Sale		
"Whole Lot of Leavin'"	Lost Highway		
"Who Says You Can't Go Home"	Have a Nice Day		A country version of this song was also released as a duet with Jennifer Nettles.
"Who Would You Die For"	Burning Bridges	John Shanks	
"Why Aren't You Dead?"	100,000,000 Bon Jovi Fans Can't Be Wrong		
"Wildflower"	Have a Nice Day		
"Wild in the Streets"	Slippery When Wet	Bruce Fairbairn	
"Wild is the Wind"	New Jersey	Bruce Fairbairn	
"Without Love"	Slippery When Wet	Bruce Fairbairn	
"With These Two Hands"	What About Now		Bonus Track on iTunes Store Deluxe Version, Deluxe Edition, Japanese Edition, and Australian Deluxe Edition
"Woman in Love"	Keep the Faith		
"Work for the Working Man"	The Circle		
"You Can Sleep While I Dream"	100,000,000 Bon Jovi Fans Can't Be Wrong		
"You Can't Lose at Love"	non-album release		B-Side of It's My Life
"You Give Love a Bad Name"	Slippery When Wet	Bruce Fairbairn	
"You Had Me from Hello"	Bounce		
"(You Want To) Make a Memory"	Lost Highway		
