= Breakout: Video Singles =

Breakout: The Singles

Video by Bon Jovi
- Released: 1985
- Recorded: 1984–1985
- Genre: Glam metal; hard rock
- Length: 30 minutes
- Label: Polygram Video

Bon Jovi chronology
Breakout: The Singles (1985)	Slippery When Wet: The Videos (1987)

Breakout: The Singles is the first video compilation by rock band Bon Jovi. The six videos are of the singles released from the band's first two albums, Bon Jovi and 7800°Fahrenheit.

== Track listing ==
No.	Title	Writer(s)	Director	Length
1.	"In and Out of Love"	Jon Bon Jovi	Martin Kahan
2.	"Only Lonely"	J. Bon Jovi; David Bryan	Jack Cole
3.	"Silent Night"	J. Bon Jovi	Marcello Epstein
4.	"She Don't Know Me"	Mark Avsec	Martin Kahan
5.	"Runaway"	J. Bon Jovi; George Karak	Mike Cuesta
6.	"The Hardest Part Is the Night" (Live)	J. Bon Jovi; Richie Sambora; Bryan	Sadao Matsunaga

== Certifications ==
Region	Certification	Certified units/sales
United States (RIAA)	Platinum	100,000^{^}
^{^} Shipments figures based on certification alone.
