= Forever (Bon Jovi album) =

2024 album by Bon Jovi

Studio album by Bon Jovi
- Released: June 7, 2024
- Recorded: 2023
- Studio: Ocean Way, Nashville; Multiview, Los Angeles
- Genre: Rock
- Length: 48:41
- Label: Island
- Producer: Jon Bon Jovi; John Shanks; Joe Rubel

Bon Jovi chronology
2020 (2020)	Forever (2024)	Forever (Legendary Edition) (2025)

Singles from Forever
- 1. "Legendary" Released: March 14, 2024; 2. "Living Proof" Released: May 17, 2024

Forever (Legendary Edition)

Studio album by Bon Jovi
- Released: October 24, 2025
- Length: 55:15
- Label: Island
- Producer: Bon Jovi; Shanks

Bon Jovi chronology
Forever (2024)	Forever (Legendary Edition) (2025)

Singles from Forever (Legendary Edition)
- 1. "The People's House (with The War & Treaty)" Released: August 30, 2024; 2. "Red, White and Jersey" Released: August 29, 2025; 3. "Hollow Man (with Bruce Springsteen)" Released: August 29, 2025; 4. "Living Proof (with Jelly Roll)" Released: September 19, 2025; 5. "We Made It Look Easy (with Robbie Williams)" Released: October 17, 2025

Forever is the sixteenth studio album by American rock band Bon Jovi, released on June 7, 2024, through Island Records. It was preceded by the singles "Legendary" and "Living Proof". It is their first studio album recorded with longtime producer John Shanks on rhythm guitar and Everett Bradley on percussion and backing vocals as official members, marking their first album to be recorded and released as a 7-piece band.

== Background and composition ==
The album is Bon Jovi's first since Jon Bon Jovi had vocal cord surgery in 2022, which was part of the band's 2024 Hulu docuseries Thank You, Goodnight: The Bon Jovi Story, released in conjunction with the band's 40th anniversary. After his recovery, Bon Jovi regained his joy and confidence, inspiring him to start writing music again.

The album opens with the pop-rock song "Legendary", which reflects on the past while looking forward to the future. Bon Jovi explained: "I just feel that there's an opportunity for me to leave a legacy that was there to do some good and maybe just cause a little ripple in the sea." "Living Proof" is the first Bon Jovi song in 14 years that features the use of the talk box, being last used in their 2010 song "This Is Love This Is Life." This sound effect is famously known from their hits "It's My Life" and "Livin' on a Prayer".

"Kiss the Bride" is a wedding song written by Bon Jovi for his daughter, Stephanie Bongiovi. "Living in Paradise" is a collaboration song with British songwriter/singer Ed Sheeran. The song was composed during a weekend when Ed and his family were at Jon Bon Jovi's house. The composition began when Ed started asking for Jon's advice regarding his life experiences. "My First Guitar" is a song composed by Bon Jovi using his very first guitar, which he managed to repurchase from the person he sold it to 45 years ago.

== Release and promotion ==
In October 2023, MusiCares announced that Jon Bon Jovi had been selected as the 2024 Person of the Year. During the gala event on February 2, 2024, the band performed "Legendary" for the first time. On March 12, a video titled "Bon Jovi Forever" was uploaded to the band's YouTube channel, announcing the album title and the release of the lead single "Legendary" on March 14. The video also included snippets of the songs "We Made It Look Easy", "Living Proof", and "Waves". On May 15, the band announced that the second single "Living Proof" would be released on May 17. On May 20, the band began posting track-by-track commentary and snippets of each song's chorus on their social media. The album was released on June 7. On August 30, a duet of the song "The People's House" featuring The War and Treaty was released, accompanied by a lyric video. On October 11, the official music video for “The People’s House” featuring The War and Treaty was released, accompanied by a statement from Jon Bon Jovi endorsing Kamala Harris in the 2024 United States presidential election. During the filming of the video on a bridge in Nashville, Jon Bon Jovi stopped a woman's suicide attempt.

In August 2025, rumors circulated online suggesting that Bon Jovi had retired. On August 25, drummer Tico Torres addressed the speculation in a video statement, clarifying that the band had not disbanded. Two days later, on August 27, Bon Jovi announced a new edition of the album, titled Forever (Legendary Edition) — a re-recorded version of the original album's tracklist featuring guest appearances by Bruce Springsteen, Jelly Roll, Robbie Williams, Avril Lavigne, and others, as well as a brand new song titled "Red, White and Jersey". On October 24, Forever (Legendary Edition) was released, preceded by the singles "Red, White and Jersey" and "Hollow Man" (with Bruce Springsteen) on August 29, "Living Proof" (with Jelly Roll) on September 19, and "We Made It Look Easy" (with Robbie Williams) on October 17.

== Forever Tour ==
On October 22, 2025, the band officially announced their upcoming Forever Tour during a special YouTube livestream event. The initial tour schedule includes seven performances across New York, Dublin, London, and Edinburgh, marking the band's return to the stage after Jon Bon Jovi's vocal surgery.

== Critical reception ==
Professional ratings
Aggregate scores
Source	Rating
Metacritic	61/100
Review scores
Source	Rating
AllMusic	3/5 stars
Classic Rock	4/5 stars
The Independent	8/10
Kerrang!	4/5

Forever received a score of 61 out of 100 on review aggregator Metacritic based on five critics' reviews, indicating "generally favorable" reception. AllMusic's Stephen Thomas Erlewine wrote that "as the first record Bon Jovi has made since their singer's surgery, it also functions as an unveiling of a revived band" and "this sense of refinement suits a group who knows they're a bit older and a bit slower than they were 40 years ago but they're grateful to still be happy doing what they're doing all these decades later." Steve Beebee of Kerrang! called Forever "an album by an artist who has much to celebrate and nothing left to prove" and found that the music "has a kind of open-road joy about it. The songs are reflective, certainly, and often chime with Bon Jovi classics of the past." Bryan Rolli of Ultimate Classic Rock wrote that "the guitars are sterile, the lyrics are treacly and you can telegraph exactly where the band's going to drop out for Bon Jovi to utter the hook—yet despite your best efforts, these songs will lodge themselves in your brain, because that's what this band does best."

Classic Rock's Philip Wilding wrote that unlike the "pretty much solo" 2020, "Forever sounds like a Bon Jovi album. Rock songs, power ballads, it's a big-sounding record designed to be played to big rooms." Carla Feric, reviewing the album for The Independent, concluded that "The album diverges from past material, but Jon Bon Jovi's powerful vocals have not faltered and the band's instrumentals keep the tracks catchy and fresh – making the listener want to keep this one on repeat."

== Track listing ==
All tracks are produced by Jon Bon Jovi and John Shanks, except "Living in Paradise", produced by Bon Jovi, Shanks and Joe Rubel

Forever track listing
No.	Title	Writer(s)	Length
1.	"Legendary"	Jon Bon Jovi; John Shanks; Billy Falcon	4:05
2.	"We Made It Look Easy"	Bon Jovi; Ryan Tedder; Andrew DeRoberts; Nick Long	3:15
3.	"Living Proof"	Bon Jovi; Shanks	3:39
4.	"Waves"	Bon Jovi; Shanks; Jason Isbell	3:52
5.	"Seeds"	Bon Jovi; Tedder; Sean Douglas; Michael Pollack	5:05
6.	"Kiss the Bride"	Bon Jovi; Falcon	3:51
7.	"The People's House"	Bon Jovi	4:36
8.	"Walls of Jericho"	Bon Jovi; Shanks; Philip Lawrence	3:48
9.	"I Wrote You a Song"	Bon Jovi; Shanks; Falcon	3:25
10.	"Living in Paradise"	Bon Jovi; Ed Sheeran	3:16
11.	"My First Guitar"	Bon Jovi	4:55
12.	"Hollow Man"	Bon Jovi	4:54
Total length:			48:41

Japanese deluxe edition / extended digital bonus tracks
No.	Title	Writer(s)	Length
13.	"That Was Then, This Is Now"	Bon Jovi; Shanks; Lawrence	4:57
14.	"Legendary" (demo)	Bon Jovi; Shanks; Falcon	4:09
Total length:			57:53

Japanese deluxe edition Blu-ray
No.	Title	Writer(s)	Length
1.	"Track by Track Commentary"
2.	"Behind the Scenes"
3.	"Legendary" (music video)	Bon Jovi; Shanks; Falcon
4.	"Runaway" (music video)	Bon Jovi; George Karak
5.	"Livin' on a Prayer" (music video)	Bon Jovi; Richie Sambora; Desmond Child
6.	"It's My Life" (music video)	Bon Jovi; Sambora; Max Martin

Forever (Legendary Edition) track listing
No.	Title	Writer(s)	Length
1.	"Red, White and Jersey"	Bon Jovi; Shanks; Ashley Gorley; Casey Brown	3:36
2.	"Legendary" (with James Bay)	Bon Jovi; Shanks; Falcon	4:04
3.	"We Made It Look Easy" (with Robbie Williams)	Bon Jovi; Tedder; DeRoberts; Long	3:14
4.	"Living Proof" (with Jelly Roll)	Bon Jovi; Shanks	3:38
5.	"Waves" (with Jason Isbell)	Bon Jovi; Shanks; Isbell	3:52
6.	"Seeds" (with Ryan Tedder)	Bon Jovi; Tedder; Douglas; Pollack	5:05
7.	"Kiss the Bride" (with Billy Falcon)	Bon Jovi; Falcon	3:52
8.	"The People's House" (with The War & Treaty)	Bon Jovi	4:25
9.	"Walls of Jericho" (with Joe Elliott)	Bon Jovi; Shanks; Lawrence	3:47
10.	"I Wrote You a Song" (with Lainey Wilson)	Bon Jovi; Shanks; Falcon	3:25
11.	"Living in Paradise" (with Avril Lavigne)	Bon Jovi; Sheeran	3:16
12.	"My First Guitar" (with Marcus King)	Bon Jovi	4:55
13.	"Hollow Man" (with Bruce Springsteen)	Bon Jovi	4:53
14.	"We Made It Look Easy/Hicimos Que Pareciera Fácil" (with Carín León)	Bon Jovi; Tedder; DeRoberts; Long	3:14
Total length:			55:15

Forever (Legendary Edition) LP bonus track / Japanese Legendary Edition (Deluxe)
No.	Title	Writer(s)	Length
15.	"Fight Somebody"	Bon Jovi; Falcon; Jordan Schmidt; Ernest Smith	3:46
Total length:			59:01

== Personnel ==
Bon Jovi

- Jon Bon Jovi – lead vocals
- David Bryan – keyboards, backing vocals
- Tico Torres – drums
- Hugh McDonald – bass
- Phil X – lead guitar, talk box, backing vocals
- John Shanks – rhythm guitar, backing vocals
- Everett Bradley – percussion, backing vocals

Additional musicians

- Bradley Giroux – drum programming (tracks 2, 3, 7)
- Ryan Tedder – drum programming, synth pads (2)
- Jason Isbell – guitars (4), background vocals (4), keyboards (5), piano (5), organ (5)
- Charlie Bisharat – violin (tracks 5, 6)
- Gerardo Hilera – violin (tracks 5, 6)
- Joel Pargman – violin (tracks 5, 6)
- Michele Richards – violin (tracks 5, 6)
- Natalie Leggett – violin (tracks 5, 6)
- Songa Lee – violin (tracks 5, 6)
- Neil Samples – violin (track 5)
- Philip Vaiman – violin (track 5)
- Cameron Stone – cello (track 5)
- David Mergen – cello (track 5)
- Paula Hochhalter – cello (track 5)
- Erik Rynearson – viola (track 5)
- Luke Maurer – viola (track 5)
- Tom Lea – viola (track 5)
- Joe Rubel – synth pads (track 10)

Technical

- Joe Rubel – production (track 10)
- Ted Jensen – mastering
- Chris Lord-Alge – mixing
- Obie O'Brien – engineering
- Bradley Giroux – engineering (tracks 1–9, 11, 12)
- Steve Churchyard – engineering (tracks 5, 6, 9)
- David Campbell – string arrangement (tracks 5, 6, 9)
- Lars Fox – editing
- Chris Grainger – mastering assistance
- Brian Judd – mixing assistance
- Greyson Smith – mixing assistance
- Katelyn Prieboy – engineering assistance
- Logan Taylor – engineering assistance (tracks 5, 6, 9)

== Charts ==
=== Weekly charts ===
Weekly chart performance for Forever
Chart (2024)	Peak position
Australian Albums (ARIA)	4
Austrian Albums (Ö3 Austria)	2
Belgian Albums (Ultratop Flanders)	4
Belgian Albums (Ultratop Wallonia)	7
Canadian Albums (Billboard)	36
Croatian International Albums (HDU)	28
Dutch Albums (Album Top 100)	7
Finnish Albums (Suomen virallinen lista)	29
German Albums (Offizielle Top 100)	2
Hungarian Physical Albums (MAHASZ)	12
Irish Albums (Official Charts)	20
Italian Albums (FIMI)	25
Japanese Albums (Oricon)	7
Japanese Combined Albums (Oricon)	6
Japanese Hot Albums (Billboard Japan)	5
New Zealand Albums (RMNZ)	28
Polish Albums (ZPAV)	20
Scottish Albums (Official Charts)	3
Spanish Albums (Promusicae)	3
Swedish Physical Albums (Sverigetopplistan)	3
Swiss Albums (Schweizer Hitparade)	1
UK Albums (Official Charts)	3
US Billboard 200	5
US Top Rock & Alternative Albums (Billboard)	2

Weekly chart performance for Forever (Legendary Edition)
Chart (2025)	Peak position
Croatian International Albums (HDU)	23
Irish Albums (Official Charts)	9
Japanese Albums (Oricon)	30
Japanese Rock Albums (Oricon)	5
Scottish Albums (Official Charts)	1
UK Albums (Official Charts)	2
US Top Album Sales (Billboard)	17

=== Monthly charts ===
Monthly chart performance for Forever
Chart (2024)	Peak position
Japanese Albums (Oricon)	10

=== Year-end charts ===
Year-end chart performance for Forever
Chart (2024)	Position
Swiss Albums (Schweizer Hitparade)	88

== Release history ==
Release history and formats for Forever
Region	Date	Version	Label	Format	Ref
Worldwide	June 7, 2024	Standard	Island	Digital Download; Streaming; CD; LP; Cassette	
Japan	June 7, 2024	Deluxe	Island	CD+Blu-ray	
Worldwide	June 17, 2024	Extended Digital	Island	Digital Download	
Worldwide	October 24, 2025	Legendary Edition	Island	Digital Download; Streaming; CD; 2xLP	
Worldwide	October 24, 2025	Legendary Edition (Bonus Track LP)	Island	2xLP	
Japan	October 24, 2025	Legendary Edition (Deluxe)	Island	2xCD	
