= Do What You Can =

Bon Jovi song

Single by Bon Jovi and Jennifer Nettles

from the album 2020
- Released: July 23, 2020
- Genre: Country rock
- Length: 4:17
- Label: Island
- Songwriter: Jon Bon Jovi
- Producers: John Shanks; Jon Bon Jovi

Bon Jovi singles chronology
"American Reckoning" (2020)	"Do What You Can" (2020)	"Story of Love" (2021)

Jennifer Nettles singles chronology
"I Can Do Hard Things" (2019)	"Do What You Can" (2020)	"Sit Down, You're Rockin' the Boat" (2021)

"Do What You Can" is a song recorded by Bon Jovi. It was first released on July 23, 2020, as the fourth single from Bon Jovi's 2020 album. A new version of the song featuring Sugarland singer Jennifer Nettles was released as a single on September 23, 2020. This marks Bon Jovi and Nettles' second collaboration after 2006's "Who Says You Can't Go Home".

== Background ==
During the early days of the COVID-19 lockdowns, instead of playing the complete song, Bon Jovi played only the first verse and chorus and then asked fans to write their verse and tell their story. He received thousands of fan-created verses on social media. The final version of the song, written by Bon Jovi, was performed live acoustically on Jersey4Jersey benefit concert, raising six million dollars for the state of New Jersey which was hard hit during the pandemic.

== Music video ==
The music video was uploaded on August 25, 2020. The song and the video are a tribute to the citizens and workers of New York City for their efforts during the COVID-19 pandemic. A video featuring Jennifer Nettles was released on September 18, 2020.

== Charts ==
=== Weekly charts ===
Weekly chart performance for "Do What You Can"
Chart (2020)	Peak position
US Adult Contemporary (Billboard)	11
US Country Airplay (Billboard)	28

=== Year-end charts ===
Year-end chart performance for "Do What You Can"
Chart (2020)	Position
US Adult Contemporary (Billboard)	28
