= 2020 (Bon Jovi album) =

Studio album by Bon Jovi
- Released: October 2, 2020
- Recorded: 2019–2020
- Studios: Ocean Way, Hollywood
- Genre: Rock
- Length: 48:08; 47:15 (CD)
- Label: Island
- Producers: John Shanks; Jon Bon Jovi

Bon Jovi chronology
This House Is Not for Sale – Live from the London Palladium (2016)	2020 (2020)	Forever (2024)

Singles from 2020
- 1. "Unbroken" Released: November 1, 2019; 2. "Limitless" Released: February 20, 2020; 3. "American Reckoning" Released: July 10, 2020; 4. "Do What You Can" Released: July 23, 2020; 5. "Story of Love" Released: February 1, 2021

2020 is the fifteenth studio album by American rock band Bon Jovi. The album was initially set for release on May 15, 2020, through Island, but was later pushed back to October 2, 2020, due to the COVID-19 pandemic.

The album's debut single "Unbroken" was released in November 2019, and the second single "Limitless" was released on February 20, 2020. "American Reckoning" was released on July 10, 2020, along with a lyric video, and "Do What You Can" was released on July 23, 2020. The music video for "Do What You Can" was released on August 25, 2020.

While in quarantine, lead singer Jon Bon Jovi wrote two songs that would be included in the final album: "Do What You Can", which represents the fight against the COVID-19 pandemic and "American Reckoning", a protest song about the murder of George Floyd, written in support of the Black Lives Matter movement. Before the postponement, the songs "Luv Can" and "Shine" were initially part of the album, but were replaced with "Do What You Can" and "American Reckoning". The tracklist order also changed, as the first version of the album was set to start with "Beautiful Drug" and finish with "Blood in the Water".

== Background and recording ==
Recording of the album started on Saturday, March 9, 2019 in Ocean Way Recording studio in Nashville. On the same day, Jon posted 30-second long Instagram story videos showing him, Tico Torres, David Bryan, John Shanks, Hugh McDonald and Phil X tuning up their instruments in the same studio. Jon Bon Jovi recorded all the songs on his smartphone in poor audio quality and brought them to the rest of the band. During the period of 11 days in Nashville, band recorded bed tracks for 23 songs. Bon Jovi then picked his favorite 10 songs, and for those songs, the band recorded vocals, guitar, piano, keyboard and percussion overdubs as well backing vocals sung by all of the band members. However, due to the COVID-19 pandemic, the release of the album was postponed, and a tour was cancelled. The murder of George Floyd inspired him to write "American Reckoning", and the pandemic gave him the opportunity to write "Do What You Can". Both were written in his home studio.

== Writing and themes ==
"Limitless" is a song that is encouraging optimism in an uncertain world and implores the listener to seize the day. "Do What You Can" is a song about the COVID-19 pandemic. Bon Jovi wrote the song the day after his wife took a photo of him washing the dishes in a JBJ Soul Kitchen restaurant and published it on social media with caption "If You Can't Do What You Do... Do What You Can". "American Reckoning" was inspired by the murder of George Floyd and Black Lives Matter Movement. Bon Jovi explained: "I was moved to write American Reckoning as a witness to history. I believe the greatest gift of an artist is the ability to use their voice to speak to issues that move us". "Story of Love" is a song about Bon Jovi's parenthood, family, children, wife and parents. The song takes a journey through the circle of life, where suddenly the child becomes the parent and the parents are getting older. "Let It Rain" is a song that calls for a cleansing of the spirit. It also calls for social justice, taking a stand and also calls for people to purge themselves from all of the hurt, hate and division and pursue them to search a man who is going to unify all the people. The last verse "somewhere there's a church bell/that's summoning the choir/somewhere there's a dreamer who would walk 1,000 miles" is a throwback to the Young Guns II (1990) era.

"Lower the Flag" is inspired by the 2019 Dayton shooting. The song laments that the news cycle will move on before there is time to grieve. It concludes with the narrator reciting the names of cities caught in the crossfire, including Las Vegas, Sandy Hook Elementary, Orlando, Florida, and Columbine. Bon Jovi started to write the song on the day the shooting happened and wrote the first draft of the song over a period of two days. He continued tweaking it and realized that he did not have a proper title and the chorus for the song. He came up with the working title "Four Dead in Ohio", which is derived from the lyrics of the song "Ohio" by Crosby, Stills, Nash & Young. After writing the song, Bon Jovi played the song for a group of people, including Shanks. When Bon Jovi rewrote the lyrics in a way that the last line repeated what the first line of the lyrics said, he came up with a title "Lower the Flag". The bridge of the song was different for Bon Jovi from a compositional point-of-view, but the rhythm of the melody was something easy to compose for him. When he finished with the writing, he went in the studio with McDonald, Torres and Shanks. Bon Jovi played the guitar and Torres played drums. While playing drums, Torres realized that drums were hindering the progress of the song, so the band decided to exclude them in the end.

"Blood In the Water" is a song that was written in 2018, and talks about migrants and the struggles they face. Bon Jovi explained: "Migrants who come to Italy or those who arrive in America from Mexico are looking for a better life. Yet we hear ignorant comments, 'I don't give a damn, let's send them back.'" "Brothers In Arms" is a song about social relevance and unity, featuring a direct reference to NFL quarterback Colin Kaepernick. Bon Jovi came to idea for the song while staying in Alabama during football season. "Unbroken" was written for the film To Be of Service, released in 2019. The song discusses soldiers who have PTSD and is from their point of view. The song is meant to honor America's veterans and their service, but also discusses the reality of their daily lives and struggles. "Shine" is a song about a partner or a child that's grown up in front of you. "Luv Can" is a song about romantic love and how it can heal, as well as religion.

== Album title and cover ==
Jon Bon Jovi revealed the album title Bon Jovi: 2020 during the Runaway to Paradise Mediterranean Cruise. Bon Jovi said he gave the album this particular title because "he now had a clear vision" after the album This House Is Not for Sale (2016), which dealt with personal issues, as well as 2020 being an American election year.

The cover shows Bon Jovi, in black and white, head tilted forward, mouth in his hand as if he's about to speak. There is an American flag in the reflection of his sunglasses. The words Bon Jovi 2020 are in the upper right corner. The zeroes in "2020" have stars in them. It is the first Bon Jovi album cover to feature only Jon Bon Jovi without any of the band members on it since their second album 7800° Fahrenheit (1985), aside from their abstract album covers. The inspiration for the album cover is a photograph of President John F. Kennedy, taken by Michael Ochs in August 1962, of him reflecting upon a crowd in California.

== Release and promotion ==
The first single "Unbroken", was released on November 1, 2019 featuring a music video. The band and Island Records donated 100 percent of net proceeds from the download of the single to the Patriotic Service Dog Foundation over the 12 months following its release. On February 6, 2020, it was announced that the next single from the album would be the song "Limitless". To preview and promote the song, a contest was launched in which fans recorded themselves singing the song, uploaded the video to the website singbonjovi.com, and shared it on their Instagram story. The prize was the opportunity to perform "Limitless" live with Jon Bon Jovi during one of the shows of the Bon Jovi: 2020 Tour. On February 19, the winner, Jean Ramos from Brazil, was announced. The performance did not take place, following the cancellation of the tour due to the COVID-19 pandemic. The song charted at number 27 on the Hot Rock and Alternative charts.

On February 20, 2020, the band officially released the single "Limitless" which charted at number 10 on the Billboard Adult Contemporary Charts. On the same day they announced the release date for the album which became available for pre-order on the band's web shop on vinyl, CD, digital download and in a T-shirt bundle version, coming with the instant download of the single "Limitless". The album was originally set to be released on May 15, 2020. On February 21, 2020, a music video for the single "Limitless" was released on YouTube.

On March 27, 2020, "Unbroken" featuring the Invictus Game Choir was released as a digital single download and featured a new music video. All of the single's proceeds go to the Invictus Games Foundation, in support of the recovery and rehabilitation of international wounded, injured or sick military personnel.

"American Reckoning" was released through all digital platforms on July 10, 2020. On the same day, lyrics and lyrical video were also released. All of the single's proceeds go to support the Bryan Stevenson's Equal Justice Initiative until December 31, 2020.

In the early days of quarantine, instead of playing the complete song "Do What You Can", Bon Jovi played only the first verse and chorus. He asked fans to write their verse and tell their story. He received thousands of fan-created verses on social media. The final version of the song written by Bon Jovi, was performed live acoustically for the first time on Jersey4Jersey benefit concert, raising 6 million dollars for the state of New Jersey which was hard hit during the pandemic. "Do What You Can" was released as a single on July 23, 2020 and charted at number 11 on the Billboard Adult Contemporary Charts. On the same day, it was announced that the album's rescheduled release date will be October 2, 2020. Pre-orders for the album started and album track listing with songwriting credits was also announced.

A new version of the song featuring Sugarland singer Jennifer Nettles was released as a single on September 23, 2020, and featured a new music video. This version charted at number 28 on the Country Airplay charts.

In the US, the album opened at number 19 on the Billboard 200 with 24,700 album-equivalent units earned.

In 2021 "Story of Love" was released as a single with a music video and also charted on the Billboard Adult Contemporary Charts at number 13.

Due to David Bryan's commitments to the musical Diana for which he composed the music, he was unable to participate in Bon Jovi's promotional performances for the album, with Greg Mayo filling in on keyboards.

== Bon Jovi: 2020 Tour ==
Bon Jovi: 2020 Tour was officially announced on January 15, 2020, with dates across arenas in the United States. It was also announced that Bryan Adams would be the opening act for most of the concerts. Tickets went on sale to the general public on January 14, 2020, at 10 am. Every ticket sold included one copy of the album Bon Jovi: 2020. On April 20, 2020, it was announced that the entire tour would be canceled due to the ongoing COVID-19 pandemic. Ticketholders received refunds.

== Reception ==
Professional ratings
Review scores
Source	Rating
AllMusic	2.5/5 stars
The Courier-Mail	3/5 stars
laut.de	2/5 stars

The album was indifferently received, with Erlewine of AllMusic summing it up with "despite the good intentions, Bon Jovi 2020 winds up getting swallowed up by its heavy-handed rhythms and earnest murk".

== Track listing ==
All tracks are written by Jon Bon Jovi, except where noted.

Standard edition
No.	Title	Writer(s)	Length
1.	"Limitless"	Jon Bon Jovi; Billy Falcon; John Shanks	3:42
2.	"Do What You Can"		4:20
3.	"American Reckoning"		4:42
4.	"Beautiful Drug"	Bon Jovi; Falcon; Shanks	3:48
5.	"Story of Love"		5:50
6.	"Let It Rain"		4:39
7.	"Lower the Flag"		4:55
8.	"Blood in the Water"		5:58
9.	"Brothers in Arms"		4:13
10.	"Unbroken"		6:08
Total length:			48:08

Streaming deluxe edition
No.	Title	Writer(s)	Length
11.	"Do What You Can" (featuring Jennifer Nettles)		4:12
12.	"Shine"	Bon Jovi; Falcon; Shanks	5:25
13.	"Luv Can"	Bon Jovi; Falcon	5:57
Total length:			63:42

Japanese deluxe edition
No.	Title	Writer(s)	Length
11.	"Shine"	Bon Jovi; Falcon; Shanks	5:25
12.	"Luv Can"	Bon Jovi; Falcon	5:57
Total length:			59:30

Japanese limited edition SHM-CD bonus DVD
No.	Title	Writer(s)	Length
1.	"Limitless" (music video)	Bon Jovi; Falcon; Shanks	3:42
2.	"Unbroken" (music video)		5:20
3.	"Do What You Can" (music video)		4:59
Total length:			14:01

== Personnel ==
- Jon Bon Jovi – lead vocals, acoustic guitar, harmonica,
- Phil X – lead guitar, backing vocals
- David Bryan – keyboards, backing vocals
- Hugh McDonald – bass, backing vocals
- Tico Torres – drums

Additional musicians

- Everett Bradley – percussion, backing vocals
- John Shanks – rhythm guitar, keyboards, drum programming, backing vocals, production

== Charts ==
=== Weekly charts ===
Weekly chart performance for 2020
Chart (2020)	Peak position
Australian Albums (ARIA)	3
Austrian Albums (Ö3 Austria)	2
Belgian Albums (Ultratop Flanders)	6
Belgian Albums (Ultratop Wallonia)	17
Canadian Albums (Billboard)	19
Czech Albums (ČNS IFPI)	31
Dutch Albums (Album Top 100)	20
Finnish Albums (Suomen virallinen lista)	24
French Albums (SNEP)	63
German Albums (Offizielle Top 100)	3
Hungarian Albums (MAHASZ)	12
Irish Albums (Official Charts)	16
Italian Albums (FIMI)	11
Japanese Albums (Oricon)	8
Japan Hot Albums (Billboard Japan)	9
Polish Albums (ZPAV)	19
Portuguese Albums (AFP)	6
Scottish Albums (Official Charts)	6
Slovak Albums (ČNS IFPI)	53
Spanish Albums (PROMUSICAE)	2
Swedish Albums (Sverigetopplistan)	28
Swiss Albums (Schweizer Hitparade)	3
UK Albums (Official Charts)	5
US Billboard 200	19
US Top Rock Albums (Billboard)	3

=== Year-end charts ===
Year-end chart performance for 2020
Chart (2020)	Position
Austrian Albums (Ö3 Austria)	55
Swiss Albums (Schweizer Hitparade)	65

== Release history ==
Release history and formats for 2020
Region	Date	Label	Format	Catalog
Japan	May 15, 2020 (Canceled)	Island	CD	UICL-1146
Japan	May 15, 2020 (Canceled)	Island	SHM-CD+DVD	UICL-9120
Europe	October 2, 2020	Island	CD	0602508748578
Europe	October 2, 2020	Island	Double LP	0602508839290
United States	October 2, 2020	Island	CD	602508748578
Japan	October 2, 2020	Island	SHM-CD+DVD	4988031396001
United States	December 4, 2020	Island	Double LP [Gold]	B084XW1RCW
