= Hugh McDonald (bassist) =

American rock musician (born 1950)

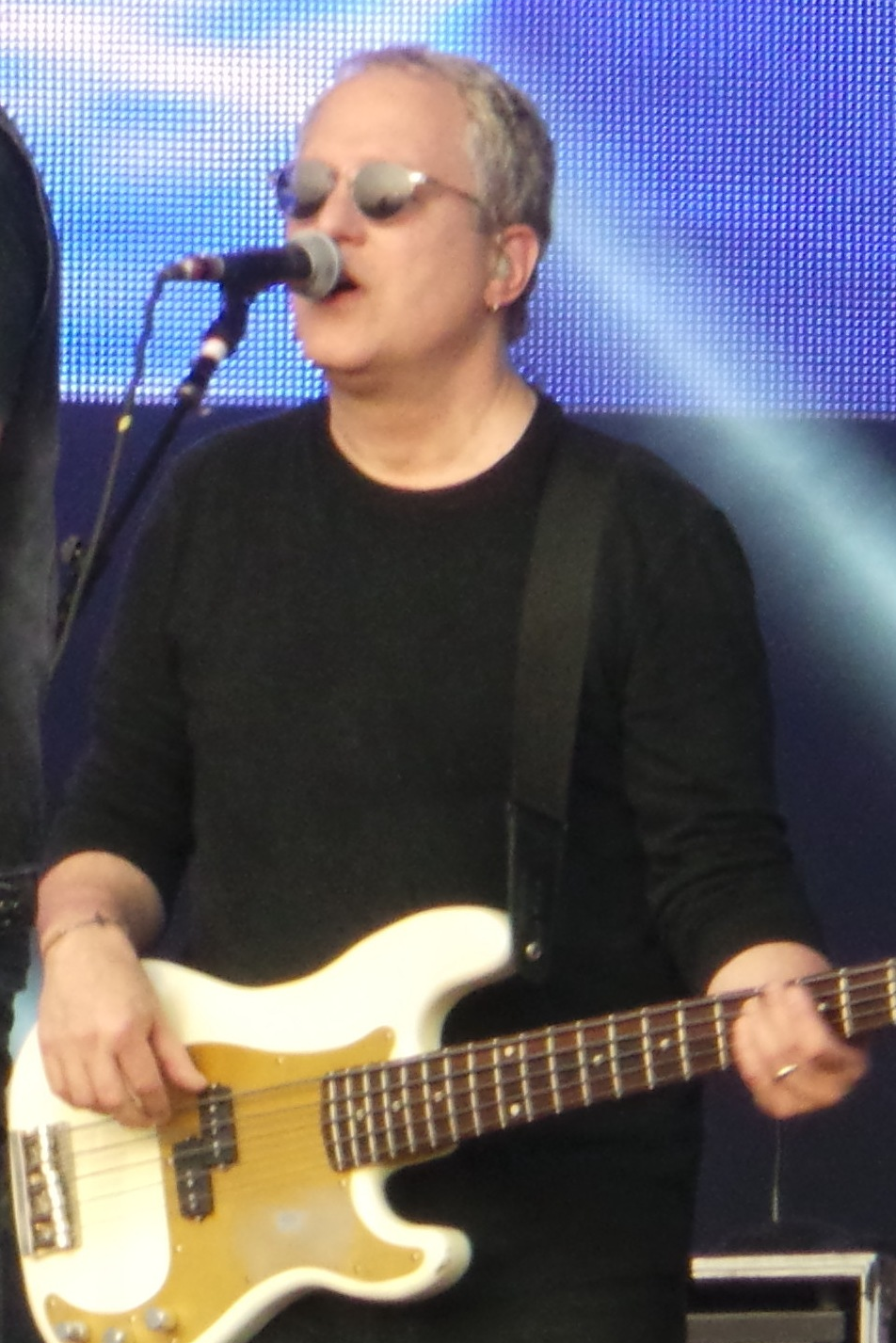
- McDonald performing with Bon Jovi in 2013

Background information
- Born: Hugh John McDonald; December 28, 1950 (age 75); Philadelphia, Pennsylvania, U.S.
- Genres: Rock, hard rock
- Occupation: Musician
- Instrument: Bass
- Years active: 1969–present
- Member of: Bon Jovi
- Formerly of: David Bromberg Band; The Big Dogs

Hugh John "Huey" McDonald (born December 28, 1950) is an American bass guitarist. He is best known for his session work and for being the bassist and backup singer of the rock band Bon Jovi, which he joined as a session/touring band member in November 1994, before being made a permanent member in 2016. Before joining Bon Jovi, McDonald was the bass guitarist for the David Bromberg Band, touring extensively worldwide and playing on many Bromberg albums. He has played with many other artists, both live and in the studio, including Willie Nelson, Steve Goodman, Ringo Starr, Lita Ford, Michael Bolton, Cher, Alice Cooper, Ricky Martin, Gavin Whittaker, Michael Bublé, Poison, and did a few dates during Shania Twain's the Woman in Me TV tour.

He has worked with Bon Jovi in the studio since its inception and has been their bass guitarist since original bass guitarist Alec John Such's departure after Cross Road (released in 1994) but was still regarded as an 'unofficial' member of Bon Jovi until 2016. At this time, McDonald was left out of most publicity shoots and album covers but did appear in some of the band's promo videos. The band members said they never agreed to officially replace Such. Regardless, his work with the band earned him a 1995 Metal Edge Readers' Choice Award for "Best Bassist" (tying with White Zombie's Sean Yseult). McDonald was one of the studio musicians that recorded Jon Bon Jovi's original first demo for the song "Runaway". When the song became a local hit, Jon Bon Jovi nevertheless assembled a band without McDonald in order to record a full band album around the hit song. He has also appeared on Jon Bon Jovi's solo album Destination Anywhere and was part of Jon Bon Jovi's backing group, The Big Dogs.

McDonald married his long-term partner, Nancy in 1996 but they divorced some years later.

In 2004, McDonald married Kelli, a horse trainer and jewelry designer. McDonald has two children, one of whom, a stepson, is also a musician. In 2018, McDonald was inducted into the Rock and Roll Hall of Fame as a member of Bon Jovi.

== Discography ==
With Alice Cooper

Studio albums

- Trash (1989)
- Hey Stoopid (1991)

Compilation albums

- Classicks (1995)

With Bon Jovi

Studio albums

- Bon Jovi (1984) (Track 1)
- Slippery When Wet (1986) (Track 3)
- Keep the Faith (1992) (Track 2)
- These Days (1995)
- Crush (2000)
- Bounce (2002)
- Have a Nice Day (2005)
- Lost Highway (2007)
- The Circle (2009)
- What About Now (2013)
- Burning Bridges (2015)
- This House Is Not for Sale (2016)
- 2020 (2020)
- Forever (2024)

With others

- Michael Bolton, Soul Provider (Columbia, 1989)
- Jon Bon Jovi, Destination Anywhere (Mercury, 1997)
- Michael Bublé, To Be Loved (Reprise, 2013)
- Carlene Carter, Two Sides to Every Woman (Warner Bros., 1979)
- Cher, Heart of Stone (Geffen, 1989)
- Cher, Love Hurts (Geffen, 1991)
- José Feliciano, And the Feeling's Good (RCA Victor, 1974)
- Steve Forbert, Little Stevie Orbit (Nemperor, 1980)
- Steve Forbert, Steve Forbert (Nemperor, 1982)
- Steve Goodman, Somebody Else's Troubles (Buddah, 1972)
- Steve Goodman, Jessie's Jig & Other Favorites (Asylum, 1975)
- Steve Goodman, Words We Can Dance To (Asylum, 1976)
- Steve Goodman, Artistic Hair (Red Pajamas, 1983)
- Mitch Malloy, Mitch Malloy (RCA, 1992)
- Mitch Malloy, Mitch Malloy II (Malloy, 2011)
- Ricky Martin, Ricky Martin (Columbia, 1999)
- Ricky Martin, Sound Loaded (Columbia, 2000)
- Billie Myers, Growing, Pains (Universal Music, 1997)
- Danny O'Keefe, Breazy Stories (Atlantic, 1973)
- John Prine, Sweet Revenge (Atlantic, 1973)
- Phoebe Snow, Phoebe Snow (Shelter, 1974)
- Phoebe Snow, Against the Grain (Columbia, 1978)
- Ringo Starr, Ringo the 4th (Polydor, 1977)
