= Only Lonely =

1985 single by Bon Jovi

- Artwork for the retail US single

Single by Bon Jovi

from the album 7800° Fahrenheit
- B-side: "Always Run to You"
- Released: April 8, 1985
- Studio: The Warehouse (Philadelphia, Pennsylvania)
- Genre: Hard rock; glam metal
- Length: 5:02 (album version); 3:58 (edited version)
- Label: PolyGram
- Songwriters: Jon Bon Jovi; David Bryan
- Producer: Lance Quinn

Bon Jovi singles chronology
"Burning for Love" (1984)	"Only Lonely" (1985)	"In and Out of Love" (1985)

Music video
- Only Lonely on YouTube

"Only Lonely" is a song by American rock band Bon Jovi. It was the first single taken from their second album, 7800° Fahrenheit (1985).

== Reception ==
Cash Box called it "a more textured and more melodic effort than the band's past material."

Debuting on the Hot 100 on April 20, 1985, it peaked at #54 and remained on the charts for eight weeks. The song fared better on the Mainstream Rock Tracks chart, where it peaked at #28 in May.

== Background ==
"Only Lonely" was played in the 1987 drama film Light of Day starring Michael J. Fox, Gena Rowlands, Joan Jett and Michael McKean.

"Only Lonely" was performed as a part of the encore in Bon Jovi's March 24, 2010 Circle Tour concert in Philadelphia.

== Track listing ==
European 7" Single
No.	Title	Writer(s)	Length
1.	"Only Lonely"	Jon Bon Jovi, David Bryan	3:58
2.	"Always Run to You"	Bon Jovi, Richie Sambora	5:00
Total length:			8:58

== Chart performance ==
Chart (1985)	Peak position
US Billboard Hot 100	54
US Hot Mainstream Rock Tracks (Billboard)	28
