= You Give Love a Bad Name =

1986 single by Bon Jovi

- U.S. vinyl single picture sleeve (also used for the Slippery When Wet album)

Single by Bon Jovi

from the album Slippery When Wet
- B-side: "Raise Your Hands"
- Released: July 23, 1986
- Studio: Little Mountain (Vancouver, Canada)
- Genre: Glam metal; hard rock
- Length: 3:42
- Label: Mercury
- Songwriters: Desmond Child; Jon Bon Jovi; Richie Sambora
- Producer: Bruce Fairbairn

Bon Jovi singles chronology
"Silent Night" (1985)	"You Give Love a Bad Name" (1986)	"Livin' on a Prayer" (1986)

Music video
- "You Give Love a Bad Name" on YouTube

Alternative cover

"You Give Love a Bad Name" is a song by American rock band Bon Jovi, released as the first single from their 1986 album Slippery When Wet. Written by Jon Bon Jovi, Richie Sambora, and Desmond Child about a woman who has jilted her lover, the song reached No. 1 on the U.S. Billboard Hot 100 on November 29, 1986, and became the band's first number-one hit. In 2007, the song re-entered the charts at No. 29 after Blake Lewis performed it on American Idol. Despite the lyrics of the chorus, the song should not be confused with "Shot Through the Heart", an unrelated song from Bon Jovi's 1984 self-titled debut album.

== Composition ==
The chorus tune of "You Give Love a Bad Name" was originally recorded by Bonnie Tyler under the title "If You Were a Woman (And I Was a Man)" with different lyrics commissioned by its producer Jim Steinman. Dissatisfied with its success in the US and the UK (which he attributed to reticence on the part of her label in promoting it), Desmond Child re-wrote the song with Jon Bon Jovi and Richie Sambora.

Upon the release of the Ava Max song "Kings & Queens" in 2020, comparisons were drawn with that song, "You Give Love a Bad Name", and Bonnie Tyler's "If You Were a Woman (And I Was a Man)", and reviews highlighted Desmond Child's credit as a songwriter for "Kings & Queens".

== Reception ==
Cash Box called it a "jackhammer single" that could push Bon Jovi to massive success and said that "Jon Bon Jovi’s grinding vocal and the anthemic production spell A-O-R." Billboard called it "hard rock, raspy and aggressive." In a retrospective analysis, Chris Molanphy expressed his disgust at the song, calling its lyrics "sub-Meat Loaf" (Meat Loaf being best known for his work with Steinman). However, he did credit it for introducing the genre of hair metal to the mainstream. He also noted in another commentary how the song shared many similarities with Steinman's songs due to Child's involvement, saying "Steinman might as well have [produced it]", due to Child using devices such as its verbose title and anthemic chorus, likening it to "'Bat Out of Hell' infused with Aqua Net". It was placed at No. 20 on VH1's list of the "100 Best Hard Rock Songs".

== Music video ==
The music video for the song used all-color concert footage (the only all-color video song from Slippery When Wet) and photogenic shots primarily of Jon Bon Jovi, as well as other band members in concert. This video was filmed at the Olympic Auditorium in Los Angeles, California. Bon Jovi was now being managed by Doc McGhee, who realized that Bon Jovi needed a video for MTV. Doc hired video director Wayne Isham, who had directed videos for Doc's other band, Mötley Crüe. The two bands were competitive with each other and Mötley Crüe felt betrayed that Wayne would direct one of Bon Jovi's videos. Wayne had the band's name painted on the stage and made sure that the band did not see it until they began shooting. Bon Jovi had been opening for 38 Special but became a headlining act after the video debuted.

== Awards and accolades ==
Award	Nominee/work	Category	Result	Ref.
1986 Billboard Video Music Conference	Bon Jovi	Best Overall Video	Nominated	
1986 Billboard Video Music Conference	Bon Jovi	Best Performance Group	Nominated	
1986 Billboard Video Music Conference	Bon Jovi	Best Concert Performance	Nominated	
1986 Billboard Video Music Conference	Bon Jovi	Best Audio	Nominated	
1986 Billboard Video Music Conference	Bon Jovi	Best Longform Program	Nominated	

== Track listings ==
- 7-inch single
1. "You Give Love a Bad Name" – 3:53
2. "Raise Your Hands" – 4:17
- 12-inch single
1. "You Give Love a Bad Name" – 3:53
2. "Raise Your Hands" – 4:17
3. "Borderline" – 4:10
- 7-inch picture disc single
1. "You Give Love a Bad Name" – 3:53
2. "Let It Rock" – 5:24
- CD Video single
1. "Let It Rock" – 5:24
2. "Raise Your Hands" – 4:17
3. "Without Live" – 3:32
4. "You Give Love a Bad Name" – 3:53
5. "You Give Love a Bad Name" (video) – 3:53

== Charts ==
=== Weekly charts ===
Chart (1986–1987)	Peak position
Australia (Kent Music Report)	32
Austria (Ö3 Austria Top 40)	25
Belgium (Ultratop 50 Flanders)	4
Belgium (VRT Top 30 Flanders)	4
Canada (The Record)	4
Canada Top Singles (RPM)	2
Europe (European Hot 100 Singles)	52
Finland (Suomen virallinen lista)	6
Ireland (IRMA)	21
Netherlands (Dutch Top 40)	5
Netherlands (Single Top 100)	2
New Zealand (Recorded Music NZ)	7
South Africa (Springbok Radio)	15
Spain (AFYVE)	31
Sweden (Sverigetopplistan)	14
UK Singles (Official Charts)	14
US Billboard Hot 100	1
US Mainstream Rock Airplay (Billboard)	9
US Cash Box	1

Chart (2017)	Peak position
Poland Airplay (ZPAV)	69

Chart (2025)	Peak position
Norway Airplay (VG-lista)	95

=== Year-end charts ===
Chart (1986)	Position
Belgium (Ultratop 50 Flanders)	69
Canada Top Singles (RPM)	88
Netherlands (Dutch Top 40)	75
Netherlands (Single Top 100)	46
US Billboard Hot 100	30
US Cash Box	30

Chart (1987)	Position
Canada Top Singles (RPM)	55

== Certifications ==
Region	Certification	Certified units/sales
Australia (ARIA)	5× Platinum	350,000^{‡}
Brazil (Pro-Música Brasil)	Gold	30,000^{‡}
Canada (Music Canada)	Gold	50,000^{^}
Denmark (IFPI Danmark)	Platinum	90,000^{‡}
Germany (BVMI)	Platinum	600,000^{‡}
Italy (FIMI)	Platinum	100,000^{‡}
New Zealand (RMNZ)	4× Platinum	120,000^{‡}
Spain (Promusicae)	Platinum	60,000^{‡}
United Kingdom (BPI)	2× Platinum	1,200,000^{‡}
United States (RIAA)	5× Platinum	5,000,000^{‡}
^{^} Shipments figures based on certification alone.^{‡} Sales+streaming figures based on certification alone.

== See also ==
- List of glam metal albums and songs
- "Kings & Queens"
