= The Hardest Part Is the Night =

1985 single by Bon Jovi

Single by Bon Jovi

from the album 7800° Fahrenheit
- B-side: "Always Run to You"
- Released: August 21, 1985
- Studio: The Warehouse (Philadelphia, Pennsylvania)
- Genre: Glam metal; pop metal; hard rock
- Length: 4:25
- Label: PolyGram
- Songwriters: Jon Bon Jovi; David Bryan; Richie Sambora
- Producer: Lance Quinn

Bon Jovi singles chronology
"In and Out of Love" (1985)	"The Hardest Part Is the Night" (1985)	"Silent Night" (1985)

"The Hardest Part Is the Night" is a single by American rock band Bon Jovi released exclusively in the UK. It is taken from their second album, 7800° Fahrenheit. It is notable for being the first Bon Jovi single to reach the top 100 in the UK, where it charted at number 68.

== Overview ==
Among Bon Jovi's early songs, "The Hardest Part is the Night" is the one that expresses most clearly Jon Bon Jovi's concerns with working class issues and the struggles of the underdog, a theme that would later bring success to the band with "Livin' on a Prayer". The song makes vague references to a young man battling against the odds to succeed in life, though he knows that he is ultimately "going down".

The promotional video was an excerpt from a live performance in Japan and was directed by Sadao Matsunago for Spirit Entertainment, Ltd.

== Chart performance ==
Chart (1985)	Peak position
UK Singles (Official Charts)	68
