= In and Out of Love (Bon Jovi song) =

1985 single by Bon Jovi

Single by Bon Jovi

from the album 7800° Fahrenheit
- Released: July 19, 1985
- Studio: The Warehouse (Philadelphia, Pennsylvania)
- Genre: Glam metal; hard rock
- Length: 4:26
- Label: Polygram
- Songwriter: Jon Bon Jovi
- Producer: Lance Quinn

Bon Jovi singles chronology
"Only Lonely" (1985)	"In and Out of Love" (1985)	"The Hardest Part Is the Night" (1985)

Music video
- In and Out of Love on YouTube

"In and Out of Love" is a single by American rock band Bon Jovi. It is taken from their second album, 7800° Fahrenheit.

== Overview ==
The song also featured on the band's best-of album Cross Road, and Disc Two of their Greatest Hits album. A live version of the song, recorded in Tokyo during summer 1985, can be found on the album One Wild Night Live 1985-2001.

In an interview, Bon Jovi said that he wrote the song while watching MTV's Top 20 Video Countdown.

Cash Box said that it "kicks into gear from the start and never lets go" and has a strong melody.

The single entered the Billboard Rock chart in July 1985, peaking at No. 37. It entered the Hot 100 in August and peaked at No. 69, holding that position for two weeks.

== Chart performance ==
Chart (1985)	Peak position
US Billboard Hot 100	69
US Top Rock Tracks (Billboard)	37
