= Silent Night (Bon Jovi song) =

1985 single by Bon Jovi

Single by Bon Jovi

from the album 7800° Fahrenheit
- Released: October 22, 1985
- Studio: The Warehouse (Philadelphia, Pennsylvania)
- Genre: Hard rock; glam metal; power ballad
- Length: 5:08
- Label: PolyGram
- Songwriter: Jon Bon Jovi
- Producer: Lance Quinn

Bon Jovi singles chronology
"The Hardest Part Is the Night" (1985)	"Silent Night" (1985)	"You Give Love a Bad Name" (1986)

Music video
- Silent Night on YouTube

"Silent Night" is a power ballad by American glam metal band Bon Jovi. It is taken from their second album, 7800° Fahrenheit (1985).

It was the album's final single, debuting on the Billboard Mainstream Rock Tracks chart Christmas week 1985 and hitting its peak of #24 a month later. The ballad was the glam metal album's most successful entry at rock radio, although it did not make the pop chart.

== Chart performance ==
Chart (1986)	Peak position
US Album Rock Tracks (Billboard)	24
