= Runaway (Bon Jovi song) =

1984 single by Bon Jovi

Single by Bon Jovi

from the album Bon Jovi
- B-side: "Love Lies"
- Released: February 25, 1984 (US)
- Recorded: 1981; 1982 (hit version)
- Studio: Power Station (New York, New York)
- Genre: Hard rock; glam metal; pop metal; power pop
- Length: 3:52
- Label: Mercury
- Songwriters: Jon Bon Jovi; George Karak
- Producers: Tony Bongiovi; Lance Quinn

Bon Jovi singles chronology
"Runaway" (1984)	"She Don't Know Me" (1984)

Music video
- Runaway on YouTube

"Runaway" is the debut single by American rock band Bon Jovi. It was originally recorded in 1981 for the so-called "Power Station Demos" at the beginning of singer Jon Bon Jovi's career, featuring the vocalist backed by session musicians.

The song became a surprise hit in 1983 on WAPP-FM (now WKTU), leading to the formation of the first proper lineup of Bon Jovi for a short tour.

== Background ==
The track was recorded in 1982 at the Power Station recording studio, and released to radio in 1983. Jon Bon Jovi chose studio musicians who were recording with other artists using the studio at the time—these musicians became known as "The All Star Revue", which included: bassist Hugh McDonald (who would join Bon Jovi in 1994 as an unofficial member); guitarist Tim Pierce (who was working on a John Waite record with producer Neil Giraldo); drummer Frankie LaRocka; and keyboardist Roy Bittan. The keyboard intro was written by Mick Seeley—then of John Bongiovi and the Wild Ones and later with Southside Johnny and the Asbury Jukes—who also performed backing vocals on the track with David Grahmme.

In 1983, local radio station WAPP 103.5 FM "The Apple" had a contest, held in conjunction with St. John's University, to search for the best unsigned band. After the song won the contest, it became a radio hit in the summer of 1983.

"Runaway" became the first single from the band's self-titled debut album. It hit the Top 40 on the Billboard Hot 100 at #39 in early 1984 and became the band's first Top 40 hit in the US.

A dance/club remake of "Runaway" was released in July 2008 by "DJ Freddy Retro featuring Jim Davis Jr." on Casa Records.

The music video was directed by Mike Cuesta (not to be confused with TV producer Michael Cuesta) and featured Jennifer Gatti in one of her earliest roles.

== Live performances ==
In latter-day live performances, Jon Bon Jovi has been known to do a short guitar solo near the end of the song instead of hitting the high notes at the end; previously this was something only done in the 1980s, as heard on the vintage performance featured on One Wild Night: Live 1985-2001.

After the band attained worldwide fame in the mid to late 1980s, they largely dropped earlier material from live performances, in favor of more well known and accomplished material. However, "Runaway" is a song of which they remain proud. Since the early 1990s, it has been the only song from the band's first two albums to be performed on a regular basis. "I still think a couple of the songs hold up," Bon Jovi said of the debut album in 2007. "'Runaway', definitely." A few others have been played live over the years, notably during The Circle Tour in 2010; however they were extreme rarities when they appeared and were not regularly performed.

== Covers & samples ==
Rapper Tru-NC released an updated hip-hop version of the song in 2011 with the same title. It tells a story about Tommy & Gina getting evicted from their apartment. The song is available to download for free at Tru-NC's ReverbNation page.

American rapper Immortal Technique samples the synthesizer in the track "Young Lords" from his album The Martyr (2011).

Mississippi rapper Tito Lopez samples the song on his own track "Married to the Mob" on his mixtape Tito Be Killing These Bitches 3.

Finnish melodic death metal band Blind Stare covered the track on the digipak edition of their Symphony of Delusions album.

== In popular culture ==
- The song was released as downloadable content for the video game Rock Band 3 on November 9, 2010.

== Track listing ==
US Vinyl, 7
No.	Title	Length
1.	"(A) Runaway"	3:54
2.	"(B) Love Lies"	4:08

UK Vinyl, 7", Single
No.	Title	Length
1.	"(A) Runaway"
2.	"(B) Breakout (Live)"

== Charts ==
Chart (1984–1985)	Peak position
US Billboard Hot 100	39

Chart (2022–2023)	Peak position
Finland Airplay (Radiosoittolista)	47
Hungary (Single Top 40)	29

== Certifications ==
Region	Certification	Certified units/sales
Australia (ARIA)	Gold	35,000^{‡}
Germany (BVMI)	Gold	300,000^{‡}
New Zealand (RMNZ)	Gold	15,000^{‡}
Spain (Promusicae)	Gold	30,000^{‡}
United Kingdom (BPI)	Silver	200,000^{‡}
United States (RIAA)	Platinum	1,000,000^{‡}
^{‡} Sales+streaming figures based on certification alone.
