= Bon Jovi (album) =

1984 studio album by Bon Jovi

Studio album by Bon Jovi
- Released: January 23, 1984
- Recorded: 1982–1983
- Studios: Power Station (New York, New York)
- Genres: Glam metal; hard rock
- Length: 38:33
- Labels: Mercury; Vertigo
- Producers: Tony Bongiovi; Lance Quinn

Bon Jovi chronology
Bon Jovi (1984)	7800° Fahrenheit (1985)

Singles from Bon Jovi
- 1. "Runaway" Released: February 25, 1984; 2. "She Don't Know Me" Released: May 22, 1984; 3. "Burning for Love" Released: October 17, 1984; 4. "Shot Through the Heart" Released: 1984

Bon Jovi is the debut studio album by American rock band Bon Jovi, released on January 23, 1984, by Mercury Records. Produced by Tony Bongiovi and Lance Quinn, it is significant for being the only Bon Jovi album in which a song ("She Don't Know Me") appears that was not written or co-written by a member of the band. The album charted at number 43 on the US Billboard 200.

Aside from the hit single "Runaway", songs from the album were rarely performed live after Bon Jovi released Slippery When Wet in 1986. However, on the band's 2010 Circle Tour, songs including "Roulette", "Shot Through the Heart" and "Get Ready" were performed. The album was ranked the 11th best rock album of 1984 by Kerrang! magazine.

The song "Shot Through the Heart" should not be confused with the much better-known "You Give Love a Bad Name" from Slippery When Wet.

On January 25, 2024, the band announced and released the 40th anniversary edition of the album on the same day.

== Background ==
In 1980, Jon Bon Jovi (born John Francis Bongiovi) began work at Power Station, a Manhattan recording facility co-founded by his cousin, Tony Bongiovi. Jon made several demos and sent them out to record companies, but failed to make an impact.

In 1982, Jon went to local radio station WAPP 103.5FM "The Apple". DJ Chip Hobart listened to the demos and loved "Runaway", deciding to include it on the station's compilation album of local homegrown talent. The studio musicians who helped record "Runaway" were known as The All Star Review. They were: guitarist Tim Pierce, keyboardist Roy Bittan, drummer Frankie LaRocka, bass guitarist Hugh McDonald, and additional singers David Grahmme and Mick Seeley (Seeley also composed the distinctive keyboard riff that opens the song). In 1994, McDonald would later replace Alec John Such as Bon Jovi's bass guitarist, initially only as a touring and session musician, before becoming a full member in 2016.

The song began to get airplay around New York. Jon signed to Mercury Records, part of the PolyGram company. He wanted a band name and the A&R staff at PolyGram came up with Bon Jovi.

In March 1983, Bon Jovi called David Bryan (then known as Rashbaum), who in turn called bass guitarist Alec John Such and an experienced drummer named Tico Torres. At that time Bon Jovi's lead guitarist was Dave Sabo, a childhood friend of Jon's who later formed the band Skid Row. Sabo was never intended as a full-time member of the band, and was soon replaced by Richie Sambora.

"We weren't a good band", Bon Jovi said in 2007. "We didn't become a good band until the third record, but we had a drummer who could keep time, which you should never take for granted. But I did okay for a 22-year-old. I'd only been in a studio for three years total prior to that record and I didn't know anything about comping a vocal – where you take a word or a line from one track and piece it together. I was thinking, My God, I'm so bad that they have to put my vocals together for me. The engineer was saying, Don't fret, Jon: even Freddie Mercury and the greats have to comp a vocal."

== Release and reception ==
Professional ratings
Review scores
Source	Rating
AllMusic	3.5/5 stars
The Rolling Stone Album Guide	2/5 stars

AllMusic has retrospectively rated Bon Jovi three-and-a-half out of five stars. Leslie Mathew, who reviewed the album, said: "The songs may be simple and the writing prone to all clichés of the form, but the album boasts a pretty consistent hard rock attack, passionate playing, and a keen sense of melody", and called the album "an often-overlooked minor gem from the early days of hair metal".

== Track listing ==
Side one
No.	Title	Writer(s)	Length
1.	"Runaway"	Jon Bon Jovi; George Karak	3:50
2.	"Roulette"	Bon Jovi; Richie Sambora	4:38
3.	"She Don't Know Me"	Mark Avsec	4:02
4.	"Shot Through the Heart"	Bon Jovi; Jack Ponti	4:16
5.	"Love Lies"	Bon Jovi; David Bryan	4:06

Side two
No.	Title	Writer(s)	Length
6.	"Breakout"	Bon Jovi; Bryan	5:20
7.	"Burning for Love"	Bon Jovi; Sambora	3:51
8.	"Come Back"	Bon Jovi; Sambora	3:56
9.	"Get Ready"	Bon Jovi; Sambora	4:07

1998 special edition bonus CD PHCR-90011/2
No.	Title	Writer(s)	Length
1.	"Runaway" (live Le Zenith 1988)	Bon Jovi; Karak	5:18
2.	"Roulette" (live BBC Friday Rock Show)	Bon Jovi; Sambora	5:39
3.	"Shot Through the Heart" (live Japan Tour 1985)	Bon Jovi; Ponti
4.	"Burning for Love" (live Japan Tour 1985)	Bon Jovi; Sambora
5.	"Get Ready" (live Japan Tour 1985)	Bon Jovi; Sambora	7:04
6.	"Breakout" (live Super Rock '84)	Bon Jovi; Bryan	6:26
7.	"Runaway" (live Super Rock '84)	Bon Jovi; Karak

2010 special edition bonus tracks
No.	Title	Writer(s)	Length
1.	"Runaway" (live Japan Tour 1985)	Bon Jovi; Karak	5:18
2.	"Roulette" (Live Japan Tour 1985)	Bon Jovi; Sambora	5:39
3.	"Breakout" (live Japan Tour 1985)	Bon Jovi; Bryan	6:26
4.	"Get Ready" (live Japan Tour 1985)	Bon Jovi; Sambora	7:04

2024 40th Anniversary bonus tracks (CD release only; not found on vinyl or cassette editions)
No.	Title	Writer(s)	Length
10.	"Runaway" (cassette writing demo)	Bon Jovi; Karak	2:14
11.	"Runaway" (pre-production studio demo)	Bon Jovi; Karak	4:08
12.	"Runaway" (alternate version)	Bon Jovi; Karak	4:18
13.	"Runaway" (extended version, 2024 mix)	Bon Jovi; Karak	4:42
14.	"Come Back" (reference vocal version)	Bon Jovi; Sambora	4:15
15.	"Roulette" (live Tokyo 1985, Obie O’Brien mix)	Bon Jovi; Sambora	5:38
16.	"Breakout" (live Tokyo 1985, Obie O’Brien mix)	Bon Jovi; Bryan	7:06
17.	"Runaway" (live Tokyo 1985, Obie O’Brien mix)	Bon Jovi; Karak	5:17
18.	"Get Ready" (live Tokyo 1985, Obie O’Brien mix)	Bon Jovi; Sambora	7:03

== Personnel ==
Bon Jovi

- Jon Bon Jovi – lead and backing vocals, guitar
- Richie Sambora – guitar and backing vocals (except “Runaway”)
- David Bryan (credited as "David Rashbaum") – keyboards and backing vocals (except “Runaway”)
- Alec John Such – bass and backing vocals (except “Runaway”)
- Tico "The Hitman" Torres – drums (except “Runaway”)

Additional musicians

- Hugh McDonald – bass (only credited on "Runaway")
- Roy Bittan – keyboards on "Runaway"
- Chuck Burgi – additional drums/percussion on "Shot Through the Heart"
- Doug Katsaros – additional keyboards
- Frankie LaRocka – drums on "Runaway"
- Aldo Nova – additional guitar and keyboards on "Runaway"
- Tim Pierce – guitar on "Runaway"
- David Grahmme – backing vocals on "Runaway"
- Mick Seeley – backing vocals on "Runaway"

Production staff

- Tony Bongiovi – producer
- Lance Quinn – producer
- Larry Alexander – engineering
- Jeff Hendrickson – engineering
- John Bengelshmy – engineering
- Arthur Mann – executive producer

Design

- Spencer Drate – album design
- Judith Salavetz – album design
- Geoffrey Hargrave Thomas – photography

== Charts ==
=== Weekly charts ===
Weekly chart performance for Bon Jovi
Chart (1984–1987)	Peak position
Australian Albums (Kent Music Report)	39
Finnish Albums (Suomen virallinen lista)	18
Japanese Albums (Oricon)	38
New Zealand Albums (RMNZ)	18
Spanish Albums (AFYVE)	24
UK Albums (Official Charts)	71
US Billboard 200	43

=== Year-end charts ===
1984 year-end chart performance for Bon Jovi
Chart (1984)	Position
US Billboard 200	58

1987 year-end chart performance for Bon Jovi
Chart (1987)	Position
US Billboard 200	76

== Certifications ==
Certifications for Bon Jovi
Region	Certification	Certified units/sales
Canada (Music Canada)	Gold	50,000^{^}
Hong Kong (IFPI Hong Kong)	Gold	10,000^{*}
Switzerland (IFPI Switzerland)	Gold	25,000^{^}
United Kingdom (BPI)	Silver	60,000^{^}
United States (RIAA)	Platinum	1,000,000^{^}
^{*} Sales figures based on certification alone.^{^} Shipments figures based on certification alone.
