= 7800° Fahrenheit =

Studio album by Bon Jovi
- Released: March 27, 1985
- Recorded: January–March 1985
- Studios: The Warehouse (Philadelphia, Pennsylvania) The Hit Factory New York City
- Genres: Glam metal; hard rock
- Length: 47:10
- Labels: Mercury (US); Vertigo (EU)
- Producer: Lance Quinn

Bon Jovi chronology
Bon Jovi (1984)	7800° Fahrenheit (1985)	Slippery When Wet (1986)

Singles from 7800° Fahrenheit
- 1. "Only Lonely" Released: April 8, 1985; 2. "In and Out of Love" Released: July 19, 1985; 3. "The Hardest Part Is the Night" Released: August 21, 1985 (Europe only); 4. "Silent Night" Released: October 22, 1985

Professional ratings
Review scores
Source	Rating
AllMusic	3/5 stars
The Rolling Stone Album Guide	1.5/5 stars

7800° Fahrenheit is the second studio album by American rock band Bon Jovi, released on March 27, 1985, through Mercury Records. The album's title references the supposed melting point of rock, as the Fahrenheit scale is generally used in the United States, suggesting the album consists of "American hot rock". The artwork introduced the classic 1980s Bon Jovi logo that would later be used on Slippery When Wet and New Jersey. 7800° Fahrenheit spent 104 weeks on the Billboard 200 albums chart and was certified platinum by the Recording Industry Association of America (RIAA) on February 19, 1987. The singles "Only Lonely" and "In and Out of Love" both charted on the Billboard Hot 100.

== Background ==
Recorded in six weeks between January and March 1985, at the Warehouse Studios in Philadelphia, Pennsylvania, the album marked the final collaboration between Bon Jovi and producer Lance Quinn. It is the only Bon Jovi album to feature songwriting by four of the band members; "Secret Dreams" is the only Bon Jovi song to date for which drummer Tico Torres receives a writing credit.

While the album has proved a fan favorite, the band was unsatisfied with its sound and essentially disowned it once they had solidified their status as worldwide superstars with Slippery When Wet and New Jersey. It is the least represented album in their set lists over the course of the career: nothing from 7800° Fahrenheit was performed after the New Jersey Syndicate Tour, but a few performances of "Tokyo Road" in Japan and Brazil during the 1990s, a few performances of "Only Lonely" during The Circle Tour in 2010, and one performance of "Tokyo Road" in Hawaii, also during The Circle Tour.

"I always overlook the second album," noted Jon Bon Jovi in 2007. "Always have, always will. We had no time to make it and we didn't know who we were... We did whatever producer Lance Quinn said. He was a brilliant guitarist and had made records with Talking Heads, so you listened."

"All of us were going through tough times on a personal level," he explained at the time of Slippery When Wet's release. "And the strain told on the music we produced. It wasn't a pleasant experience... Lance Quinn wasn't the man for us, and that added to the feeling that we were going about it badly. None of us want to live in that mental state ever again. We've put the record behind us, and moved on."

== Track listing ==
Side one
No.	Title	Writer(s)	Length
1.	"In and Out of Love"	Jon Bon Jovi	4:25
2.	"The Price of Love"	Bon Jovi	4:14
3.	"Only Lonely"	Bon Jovi; David Bryan	4:58
4.	"King of the Mountain"	Bon Jovi; Richie Sambora	3:54
5.	"Silent Night"	Bon Jovi	5:07

Side two
No.	Title	Writer(s)	Length
6.	"Tokyo Road"	Bon Jovi; Sambora	5:40
7.	"The Hardest Part Is the Night"	Bon Jovi; Bryan; Sambora	4:25
8.	"Always Run to You"	Bon Jovi; Sambora	5:00
9.	"To the Fire"	Bon Jovi; Bryan; Sambora	4:27
10.	"Secret Dreams"	Bon Jovi; Sambora; Tico Torres; Bill Grabowski	4:56

- "Tokyo Road" begins with the traditional Japanese folk song "Sakura Sakura"
- Some editions of the album list "To the Fire" as "(I Don't Wanna Fall) to the Fire"

1998 special edition bonus CD PHCR-90013/4
No.	Title	Writer(s)	Length
1.	"Tokyo Road" (live in Japan, 1985)	Bon Jovi; Sambora	7:02
2.	"In and Out of Love" (live in Japan, 1985)	Bon Jovi	10:07
3.	"The Hardest Part Is the Night" (live in Japan, 1985)	Bon Jovi; Bryan; Sambora	5:23
4.	"Silent Night" (live in Japan, 1985)	Bon Jovi	7:45
5.	"Only Lonely" (live in Japan, 1985)	Bon Jovi; Bryan	6:12
6.	"Tokyo Road" (live in Rio de Janeiro, 1990)	Bon Jovi; Sambora	5:59

2010 special edition bonus tracks
No.	Title	Writer(s)	Length
11.	"In and Out of Love" (live in Japan, 1985)	Bon Jovi	12:17
12.	"Only Lonely" (live in Japan, 1985)	Bon Jovi; Bryan	6:37
13.	"Tokyo Road" (live in Japan, 1985)	Bon Jovi; Sambora	7:09
Total length:			73:27

== Personnel ==
Credits taken from 7800° Fahrenheit liner notes.

Bon Jovi

- Jon Bon Jovi – lead & backing vocals, occasional "noise guitars"
- Richie Sambora – electric guitars, acoustic 6 & 12-string guitars, backing vocals
- David Bryan – keyboards, backing vocals
- Alec John Such – bass, backing vocals
- Tico "The Hit Man" Torres – drums, percussion, backing vocals

Additional musicians

- Rick Valenti, Phil Hoffer, Carol and Jeannie Brooks – backing vocals
- Randy Cantor, Jim Salamone – synthesizer programming
- Tom Mandel – synthesizer

Production

- Lance Quinn – production
- David Thoener – mixing
- Fernando Kral – mixing assistance
- Greg Calbi – mastering
- Larry Alexander, Obie O'Brien, Mal, Bill Scheniman – engineers
- John Cianci and "Big" Al Greaves – assistants
- Digitally remastered by George Marino

Artwork

- Chris Callis – photography
- Stanley Jordan – cover art concept
- Bill Levy – art direction, artwork
- Vigon Seireeni – art direction, artwork, design

== Charts ==
=== Weekly charts ===
Weekly chart performance for 7800° Fahrenheit
Chart (1985–1987)	Peak position
Australian Albums (Kent Music Report)	30
Finnish Albums (The Official Finnish Charts)	6
German Albums (Offizielle Top 100)	40
Japanese Albums (Oricon)	5
New Zealand Albums (RMNZ)	48
Swedish Albums (Sverigetopplistan)	10
Swiss Albums (Schweizer Hitparade)	11
UK Albums (Official Charts)	28
US Billboard 200	37

=== Year-end charts ===
Year-end chart performance for 7800° Fahrenheit
Chart (1987)	Position
US Billboard 200	72

== Certifications ==
Region	Certification	Certified units/sales
Canada (Music Canada)	Platinum	100,000^{^}
Japan (RIAJ)	Gold	100,000^{^}
United Kingdom (BPI)	Silver	60,000^{^}
United States (RIAA)	Platinum	1,000,000^{^}
^{^} Shipments figures based on certification alone.
