= Cross Road (videos) =

Video by Bon Jovi
- Released: 1994
- Recorded: 1986–1994
- Genres: Rock, music video
- Length: 80 minutes
- Label: Mercury Records

Bon Jovi chronology
Keep the Faith: The Videos (1994)	Cross Road (1994)	Live From London (1995)

Cross Road is a video release of music videos by rock band Bon Jovi, coinciding with the band's greatest hits album of the same name. It contains 16 of the band's music videos, four of which were previously unreleased. Cross Road won a 1994 Metal Edge Readers Choice Award for Best Video Cassette.

The compilation was released on DVD in Japan in 1997.

== Track listing ==
1. "Livin' on a Prayer"
2. "Keep the Faith"
3. "Wanted Dead or Alive"
4. "Lay Your Hands on Me"
5. "You Give Love a Bad Name"
6. "Bed of Roses" (Short version - contains bar scene)
7. "Blaze of Glory" (Jon Bon Jovi solo, previously unreleased)
8. "In These Arms"
9. "Bad Medicine" (1st Version)
10. "I'll Be There for You"
11. "Dry County" (Previously unreleased)
12. "Living in Sin"
13. "Miracle" (Jon Bon Jovi solo, previously unreleased)
14. "I Believe"
15. "I'll Sleep When I'm Dead"
16. "Always" (Previously unreleased)

== Available on the following formats ==
- VHS
- Video CD
- DVD
- LaserDisc

== Certifications ==
Region	Certification	Certified units/sales
Argentina (CAPIF)	7× Platinum	56,000^{^}
United States (RIAA)	Gold	50,000^{^}
^{^} Shipments figures based on certification alone.
