= Greatest Hits (Bon Jovi album) =

2010 compilation album by Bon Jovi

Greatest hits album by Bon Jovi
- Released: October 29, 2010
- Recorded: 1983–2010
- Genres: Rock; pop rock; hard rock; glam metal; heavy metal
- Length: 70:53
- Label: Island
- Producers: Howard Benson; Tony Bongiovi; Jon Bon Jovi; Richie Sambora; Peter Collins; Luke Ebbin; Bruce Fairbairn; Danny Kortchmar; Lance Quinn; Bob Rock; John Shanks

Bon Jovi chronology
The Circle (2009)	Greatest Hits (2010)	Inside Out (2012)

Singles from Greatest Hits
- 1. "What Do You Got?" Released: September 21, 2010; 2. "No Apologies" Released: February 24, 2011; 3. "This Is Our House" Released: September 6, 2011

Greatest Hits is the second greatest hits compilation album by American rock band Bon Jovi, released by Island Records on October 29, 2010.

The standard edition of the album includes 14 of the band's hits and two previously unreleased songs, "What Do You Got?" and "No Apologies".

A double disc version, entitled Greatest Hits – The Ultimate Collection, was also released, featuring a second disc of fan favorites, including two original songs, "This Is Love, This Is Life" and "The More Things Change". Said new songs were written specifically for the compilation.

The font used for the band's name on the album's cover is a homage to the Bon Jovi logo used from 1985 to 1988, though still considerably different, and it was also their first release to use the heart and dagger logo.

Bon Jovi performed a special, live streaming concert for the Live on Letterman web series on November 9, 2010, where the band performed a significant part of the album during the hour-long set.

Most of the recordings are presented as they are on their parent album with the exception of Lay Your Hands on Me which is presented as an edited version found on radio and for international CD single versions.

== Release details ==
While the standard edition released in North America has 28 tracks, the Australian and Japanese editions have 30 and 31 tracks respectively. There are a few differences between the North American track list and the international track list. The main difference is the inclusion of "In and Out of Love" and "I'll Sleep When I'm Dead". Other differences include tracks from the Keep the Faith album being present on disc 1 instead of disc 2, and "Blaze of Glory" being present on disc 2 instead of disc 1. The only album by the band not represented on either version of the compilation is Bounce.

The iTunes Store includes one additional track for the standard album download which is "This Is Our House" which was released as a digital single and given additionally as a pre-order-only track was "Raise Your Hands (NMS Live – 2010)". On the ultimate collection edition of the iTunes download, "This Is Our House" is included followed by the music video for "What Do You Got", a 10-minute track-by-track video interview, a digital booklet and given additionally as pre-order-only tracks were "Raise Your Hands (NMS Live – 2010)" and "Blood on Blood (NMS Live – 2010)".

Amazon UK and France list "It's My Life (NMS Live – 2010)" as a bonus track on the standard digital edition, while Nokia's Ovi store in the United Kingdom and Ireland adds "When We Were Beautiful (NMS Live – 2010)" to both the standard and deluxe digital editions. Australia's BigPond Music and various European digital editions add "Keep the Faith (NMS Live – 2010)".

The Swedish DRM-based music streaming service Spotify got an exclusive single for unlimited and premium members, including live renditions of "Wanted Dead or Alive", "Livin' on a Prayer" and "Born to Be My Baby" recorded at the New Meadowlands Stadium in May 2010.

== Commercial performance ==
In the United States, the album debuted and peaked at number five on the Billboard 200 the week of November 27, 2010 with 88,000 copies sold, exceeding the first week sales of the band's 1994 hits collection, Cross Road, which sold 84,000 units in its debut week. The next week it dropped to number 18; it remained on the chart for 85 weeks. Additionally, it topped the Top Rock Albums and Top Hard Rock Albums charts. It was certified platinum by the RIAA on February 25, 2015, for shipments of one million.

In the United Kingdom, the album entered and peaked at number two on November 13, 2010, selling 87,000 copies, it stayed at number two for two weeks and fell to number six on its third week on the chart. It was present on the chart for 183 weeks. It was certified three times platinum by the BPI on January 2, 2015, denoting shipments of 1.7 million units.

The album also opened at number one in Portugal, Ireland and on the European Top 100 Albums chart; additionally, it debuted at number two in Germany and Austria and at number five in Norway.

== Singles ==
The new single, "What Do You Got?" hit radio airwaves globally August 26, 2010 and was released as a digital download on September 21, 2010. The band later confirmed that "No Apologies" will be a single. It was released on October 22, 2010, on the band website. A music video was made while performing in Australia. "This Is Our House" was released as a promo single.

== Track listing ==
The full track listing of the American and Canadian versions of the album were unveiled on the official Bon Jovi website, which also offered the exclusive MP3 download of "This Is Our House".

=== North American edition ===
Disc 1
No.	Title	Writer(s)	Original album	Length
1.	"Livin' on a Prayer"	Jon Bon Jovi; Richie Sambora; Desmond Child	Slippery When Wet, 1986	4:13
2.	"You Give Love a Bad Name"	Bon Jovi; Sambora; Child	Slippery When Wet	3:45
3.	"It's My Life"	Bon Jovi; Sambora; Max Martin	Crush, 2000	3:44
4.	"Have a Nice Day"	Bon Jovi; Sambora; John Shanks	Have a Nice Day, 2005	3:48
5.	"Wanted Dead or Alive"	Bon Jovi; Sambora	Slippery When Wet	5:11
6.	"Bad Medicine"	Bon Jovi; Sambora; Child	New Jersey, 1988	5:16
7.	"We Weren't Born to Follow"	Bon Jovi; Sambora	The Circle, 2009	4:03
8.	"I'll Be There for You"	Bon Jovi; Sambora	New Jersey	5:46
9.	"Born to Be My Baby"	Bon Jovi; Sambora; Child	New Jersey	4:40
10.	"Blaze of Glory" (Jon Bon Jovi solo)	Bon Jovi	Blaze of Glory, 1990	5:40
11.	"Who Says You Can't Go Home" (country version with Jennifer Nettles)	Bon Jovi; Sambora	Have a Nice Day	3:50
12.	"Lay Your Hands on Me" (radio edit)	Bon Jovi; Sambora	New Jersey	3:49
13.	"Always"	Bon Jovi	Cross Road, 1994	5:56
14.	"Runaway"	Bon Jovi; George Karak	Bon Jovi, 1984	3:53
15.	"What Do You Got?"	Bon Jovi; Sambora; Brett James	Previously unreleased	3:47
16.	"No Apologies"	Bon Jovi; Sambora	Previously unreleased	3:44
Total length:				70:53

Bonus tracks on Target edition
No.	Title	Writer(s)	Original album	Length
17.	"Diamond Ring" (live at New Meadowlands Stadium, May 2010)	Bon Jovi; Sambora; Child	These Days, 1995	3:42
18.	"We Weren't Born to Follow" (live at New Meadowlands Stadium, May 2010)	Bon Jovi; Sambora	The Circle	3:52
Total length:				78:27

Disc 2 [Ultimate Collection only]
No.	Title	Writer(s)	Original album	Length
1.	"In These Arms"	Bon Jovi; Sambora; David Bryan	Keep the Faith, 1992	5:19
2.	"Someday I'll Be Saturday Night"	Bon Jovi; Sambora; Child	Cross Road	4:39
3.	"Lost Highway"	Bon Jovi; Sambora; Shanks	Lost Highway, 2007	4:04
4.	"Keep the Faith"	Bon Jovi; Sambora; Child	Keep the Faith	5:46
5.	"When We Were Beautiful"	Bon Jovi; Sambora; Billy Falcon	The Circle	4:10
6.	"Bed of Roses"	Bon Jovi	Keep the Faith	6:38
7.	"This Ain't a Love Song"	Bon Jovi; Sambora; Child	These Days	5:06
8.	"These Days"	Bon Jovi; Sambora	These Days	6:27
9.	"(You Want To) Make a Memory"	Bon Jovi; Sambora; Child	Lost Highway	4:36
10.	"Blood on Blood"	Bon Jovi; Sambora; Child	New Jersey	6:16
11.	"This Is Love, This Is Life"	Bon Jovi; Sambora; Shanks	Previously unreleased	3:25
12.	"The More Things Change"	Bon Jovi; Sambora	Previously unreleased	3:53
Total length:				60:19

=== International edition ===
Disc one
No.	Title	Writer(s)	Original album	Length
1.	"Livin' on a Prayer"	Bon Jovi; Sambora; Child	Slippery When Wet	4:13
2.	"You Give Love a Bad Name"	Bon Jovi; Sambora; Child	Slippery When Wet	3:46
3.	"It's My Life"	Bon Jovi; Sambora; Martin	Crush	3:44
4.	"Have a Nice Day"	Bon Jovi; Sambora; Shanks	Have a Nice Day	3:48
5.	"Wanted Dead or Alive"	Bon Jovi; Sambora	Slippery When Wet	5:11
6.	"Bad Medicine"	Bon Jovi; Sambora; Child	New Jersey	5:16
7.	"We Weren't Born to Follow"	Bon Jovi; Sambora	The Circle	4:03
8.	"I'll Be There for You"	Bon Jovi; Sambora	New Jersey	5:46
9.	"Born to Be My Baby"	Bon Jovi; Sambora; Child	New Jersey	4:40
10.	"Bed of Roses"	Bon Jovi	Keep the Faith	6:38
11.	"Who Says You Can't Go Home" (rock version)	Bon Jovi; Sambora	Have a Nice Day	4:41
12.	"Lay Your Hands on Me" (radio edit)	Bon Jovi; Sambora	New Jersey	3:49
13.	"Always"	Bon Jovi	Cross Road	5:56
14.	"In These Arms"	Bon Jovi; Sambora; Bryan	Keep the Faith	5:19
15.	"What Do You Got?"	Bon Jovi; Sambora; James	Previously unreleased	3:47
16.	"No Apologies"	Bon Jovi; Sambora	Previously unreleased	3:44
Total length:				74:21

Disc two [Ultimate Collection only]
No.	Title	Writer(s)	Original album	Length
1.	"Runaway"	Bon Jovi; Karak	Bon Jovi	3:53
2.	"Someday I'll Be Saturday Night"	Bon Jovi; Sambora; Child	Cross Road	4:39
3.	"Lost Highway"	Bon Jovi; Sambora; Shanks	Lost Highway	4:04
4.	"I'll Sleep When I'm Dead"	Bon Jovi; Sambora; Child	Keep the Faith	4:41
5.	"In and Out of Love"	Bon Jovi	7800° Fahrenheit, 1985	4:26
6.	"Keep the Faith"	Bon Jovi; Sambora; Child	Keep the Faith	5:43
7.	"When We Were Beautiful"	Bon Jovi; Sambora; Falcon	The Circle	5:17
8.	"Blaze of Glory"	Bon Jovi	Blaze of Glory	5:39
9.	"This Ain't a Love Song"	Bon Jovi; Sambora; Child	These Days	5:05
10.	"These Days"	Bon Jovi; Sambora	These Days	6:27
11.	"(You Want To) Make a Memory"	Bon Jovi; Sambora; Child	Lost Highway	4:37
12.	"Blood on Blood"	Bon Jovi; Sambora; Child	New Jersey	6:16
13.	"This Is Love, This Is Life"	Bon Jovi; Sambora; Shanks	Previously unreleased	3:25
14.	"The More Things Change"	Bon Jovi; Sambora	Previously unreleased	3:53
Total length:				68:05

iTunes bonus track
No.	Title	Writer(s)	Original album	Length
15.	"This Is Our House"	Bon Jovi; Sambora; Child	Previously unreleased	4:22
Total length:				72:27

=== Japanese edition ===
Disc 1
No.	Title	Writer(s)	Original album	Length
1.	"Livin' on a Prayer"	Bon Jovi; Sambora; Child	Slippery When Wet	4:13
2.	"You Give Love a Bad Name"	Bon Jovi; Sambora; Child	Slippery When Wet	3:45
3.	"It's My Life"	Bon Jovi; Sambora; Martin	Crush	3:44
4.	"Have a Nice Day"	Bon Jovi; Sambora; Shanks	Have a Nice Day	3:48
5.	"Wanted Dead or Alive"	Bon Jovi; Sambora	Slippery When Wet	5:11
6.	"Bad Medicine"	Bon Jovi; Sambora; Child	New Jersey	5:16
7.	"We Weren't Born to Follow"	Bon Jovi; Sambora	The Circle	4:03
8.	"I'll Be There for You"	Bon Jovi; Sambora	New Jersey	5:46
9.	"Born to Be My Baby"	Bon Jovi; Sambora; Child	New Jersey	4:40
10.	"Blaze of Glory"	Bon Jovi	Blaze of Glory	5:40
11.	"Who Says You Can't Go Home" (original version)	Bon Jovi; Sambora	Have a Nice Day	4:41
12.	"Lay Your Hands on Me" (radio edit)	Bon Jovi; Sambora	New Jersey	3:49
13.	"Always"	Bon Jovi	Cross Road	5:56
14.	"Runaway"	Bon Jovi; Karak	Bon Jovi	3:53
15.	"Tokyo Road"	Bon Jovi; Sambora	7800° Fahrenheit	5:42
16.	"What Do You Got?"	Bon Jovi; Sambora; James	New song	3:47
17.	"No Apologies"	Bon Jovi; Sambora	Previously unreleased	3:44
Total length:				77:26

Disc 2 [Ultimate Collection only]
No.	Title	Writer(s)	Original album	Length
1.	"In These Arms"	Bon Jovi; Sambora; Bryan	Keep the Faith	5:19
2.	"Someday I'll Be Saturday Night"	Bon Jovi; Sambora; Child	Cross Road	4:39
3.	"Lost Highway"	Bon Jovi; Sambora; Shanks	Lost Highway	4:04
4.	"I'll Sleep When I'm Dead"	Bon Jovi; Sambora; Child	Keep the Faith	4:41
5.	"In and Out of Love"	Bon Jovi	7800° Fahrenheit	4:26
6.	"Keep the Faith"	Bon Jovi; Sambora; Child	Keep the Faith	5:43
7.	"When We Were Beautiful"	Bon Jovi; Sambora; Falcon	The Circle	5:17
8.	"Bed of Roses"	Bon Jovi	Keep the Faith	6:38
9.	"This Ain't a Love Song"	Bon Jovi; Sambora; Child	These Days	5:05
10.	"These Days"	Bon Jovi; Sambora	These Days	6:27
11.	"(You Want To) Make a Memory"	Bon Jovi; Sambora; Child	Lost Highway	4:37
12.	"Blood on Blood"	Bon Jovi; Sambora; Child	New Jersey	6:16
13.	"This Is Love, This Is Life"	Bon Jovi; Sambora; Shanks	Previously unreleased	3:25
14.	"The More Things Change"	Bon Jovi; Sambora	Previously unreleased	3:53
Total length:				70:30

== Personnel ==
- Jon Bon Jovi – lead vocals, guitar
- Richie Sambora – lead guitar, backing vocals
- David Bryan – keyboards, backing vocals
- Alec John Such – bass guitar, backing vocals
- Hugh McDonald – bass guitar, backing vocals
- Tico Torres – drums, percussion

== Charts ==
=== Weekly charts ===
Weekly chart performance for Greatest Hits
Chart (2010–2016)	Peak position
Australian Albums (ARIA)	1
Austrian Albums (Ö3 Austria)	2
Belgian Albums (Ultratop Flanders)	4
Belgian Albums (Ultratop Wallonia)	17
Canadian Albums (Billboard)	1
Danish Albums (Hitlisten)	5
Dutch Albums (Album Top 100)	3
European Top 100 Albums (Billboard)	1
Finnish Albums (Suomen virallinen lista)	6
German Albums (Offizielle Top 100)	2
Greek Albums (IFPI)	2
Hungarian Albums (MAHASZ)	7
Irish Albums (IRMA)	1
Italian Albums (FIMI)	8
Japanese Albums (Oricon)	2
Mexican Albums (Top 100 Mexico)	2
New Zealand Albums (RMNZ)	2
Norwegian Albums (VG-lista)	2
Polish Albums (ZPAV)	27
Portuguese Albums (AFP)	1
Scottish Albums (Official Charts)	1
Spanish Albums (Promusicae)	2
Swedish Albums (Sverigetopplistan)	1
Swiss Albums (Schweizer Hitparade)	3
UK Albums (Official Charts)	2
US Billboard 200	5
US Top Rock Albums (Billboard)	1
US Top Hard Rock Albums (Billboard)	1

=== Year-end charts ===
Year-end chart performance for Greatest Hits
Chart (2010)	Rank
Australian Albums Chart	4
Austrian Albums Chart	38
Belgian Albums Chart (Flanders)	59
Danish Albums Chart	27
German Albums Chart	33
Hungarian Albums Chart	33
Japan Albums Chart	52
Mexican Albums Chart	69
New Zealand Albums Chart	13
Spanish Albums Charts	32
Swiss Music Chart	57
UK Albums Chart	16
Chart (2011)	Rank
Australian Albums Chart	20
Austrian Albums Chart	52
Belgian Albums Chart (Flanders)	41
Belgian Albums Chart (Wallonia)	79
Canadian Albums Chart	8
Danish Albums Chart	80
Hungarian Albums Chart	48
Swiss Albums Chart	82
US Billboard 200	48
US Rock Albums (Billboard)	6
Chart (2013)	Rank
Australian Albums Chart	47
Chart (2014)	Rank
Australian Albums Chart	100
Chart (2019)	Rank
Australian Albums (ARIA)	84
Chart (2020)	Rank
Australian Albums (ARIA)	80
US Billboard 200	165
Chart (2021)	Rank
Australian Albums (ARIA)	64
US Billboard 200	140
Chart (2022)	Rank
Australian Albums (ARIA)	52
US Billboard 200	144
US Top Rock Albums (Billboard)	23
Chart (2023)	Rank
Australian Albums (ARIA)	67
US Billboard 200	151
US Top Rock Albums (Billboard)	30
Chart (2024)	Rank
US Billboard 200	155

=== Decade-end charts ===
Decade-end chart performance for Greatest Hits
Chart (2010–2019)	Rank
Australian Albums (ARIA)	12
UK Albums (OCC)	33

== Certifications and sales ==
Certifications and sales for Greatest Hits
Region	Certification	Certified units/sales
Australia (ARIA)	8× Platinum	560,000^{‡}
Belgium (BRMA)	Gold	15,000^{*}
Brazil (Pro-Música Brasil)	Gold	20,000^{*}
Canada (Music Canada)	3× Platinum	240,000^{^}
Finland (Musiikkituottajat)	Gold	10,203
France (SNEP)	Gold	50,000^{‡}
Germany (BVMI)	Platinum	200,000^{^}
Hungary (MAHASZ)	Gold	3,000^{^}
Ireland (IRMA)	2× Platinum	30,000^{^}
Italy (FIMI)	Platinum	60,000^{*}
Japan (RIAJ)	Gold	100,000^{^}
New Zealand (RMNZ)	2× Platinum	30,000^{‡}
Poland (ZPAV)	Gold	10,000^{*}
Portugal (AFP)	Platinum	20,000^{^}
Spain (Promusicae)	Platinum	60,000^{^}
Sweden (GLF)	Gold	20,000^{‡}
Switzerland (IFPI Switzerland)	Gold	15,000^{^}
United Kingdom (BPI)	5× Platinum	1,500,000^{‡}
United States (RIAA)	Platinum	819,000
Summaries
Europe (IFPI)	Platinum	1,000,000^{*}
^{*} Sales figures based on certification alone.^{^} Shipments figures based on certification alone.^{‡} Sales+streaming figures based on certification alone.

== Release history ==
Release history and formats for Greatest Hits
Region	Date	Label	Format
Germany	October 29, 2010	Universal Music	CD, 2×CD, digital download
Japan	November 3, 2010	Universal Music	CD, 2×CD, digital download, SHM-CD
Taiwan	November 12, 2010	Universal Music	CD, 2×CD, digital download, SHM-CD
Australia	November 5, 2010		CD, 2×CD, digital download
United Kingdom	November 1, 2010	Mercury	CD, 2×CD, digital download
United States	November 9, 2010	Island	CD, 2×CD, digital download
Canada	November 9, 2010	Universal Music	CD, 2×CD, digital download

== Rock Band 3 promotion ==
Twelve songs from the Greatest Hits album were also released as downloadable content for music video game Rock Band 3 on November 9, 2010. The pack features every song from the first disc of the North American album except "Born to Be My Baby", "Always", "What Do You Got?" and "No Apologies". It also includes the full-length version of "Lay Your Hands on Me", and not the radio edit featured on Greatest Hits.
