= Keep the Faith: The Videos =

Video by Bon Jovi
- Released: 1994
- Recorded: 1991–1993
- Genre: Rock, music video
- Length: 60 minutes
- Label: Mercury Records / PolyGram

Bon Jovi chronology
Keep the Faith: An Evening with Bon Jovi (1993)	Keep the Faith: The Videos (1994)	Cross Road (1994)

Keep the Faith: The Videos is a video release by rock band Bon Jovi featuring all the videos (except for Dry County) from their hugely successful Keep the Faith album, together with interviews, behind the scenes footage and an exclusive video for "If I Was Your Mother".

== Track listing ==
1. "Keep the Faith"
2. "Bed of Roses"
3. "In These Arms"
4. "If I Was Your Mother"
5. "I'll Sleep When I'm Dead"
6. "I Believe"
7. "I Wish Everyday Could Be Like Christmas"
8. "Cama de Rosas" ("Bed of Roses", Spanish Version)
9. "Ballad of Youth"
10. "Dyin' Ain't Much of a Livin'"
11. "I'll Sleep When I'm Dead" (Acoustic)

== Available on the following formats ==
- VHS
- Laserdisc

== Additional information ==
The video for "Dry County" is absent from this package, as the single and video were released in 1994, after Keep The Faith: The Videos was released. It was later included on the 1994 VHS release Cross Road.

== Certifications ==
Region	Certification	Certified units/sales
United States (RIAA)	Gold	50,000^{^}
^{^} Shipments figures based on certification alone.
