= We Weren't Born to Follow =

Single by Bon Jovi

from the album The Circle
- Released: August 17, 2009
- Studio: Sanctuary Studios, New Jersey; Henson Recording Studios, California
- Genre: Rock
- Length: 4:03 (Album version); 4:09 (Single edit)
- Label: Island
- Songwriters: Jon Bon Jovi, Richie Sambora
- Producer: John Shanks

Bon Jovi singles chronology
"Whole Lot of Leavin'" (2008)	"We Weren't Born to Follow" (2009)	"Superman Tonight" (2010)

"We Weren't Born to Follow" is the first single released in August 2009 from Bon Jovi's eleventh studio album, The Circle. The single premiered on radio on August 17, 2009. The single was nominated for a Grammy Award for Best Pop Performance by a Duo or Group with Vocals.

Since then, the song has reached the peak position on the Billboard Hot 100 at number 68.

== Music video ==
The music video, directed by Craig Barry and edited by Brett Langefels for the song was released on October 14, 2009. It features the band performing on the roof of the Clinton Recording Studios in New York City with skyscrapers visible behind them. Interspersed with these scenes are archive clips and pictures of important events and people in history. Designed and composited by Matthew Lucas-Valci, these scenes echo the themes of the song. The video includes images of:

- Bringing down the Berlin Wall in 1989
- Lance Armstrong winning the Tour de France
- The Dalai Lama
- A collection of the Wright brothers plane, a space shuttle and Spaceship One of Virgin Galactic
- Virgin Records owner Richard Branson
- The Great Wall of China
- The protests at Beijing's Tiananmen Square in 1989 and the famous Tank Man picture
- Images of US President Barack Obama
- Princess Diana in Africa
- Patrick Thibodeau, a renowned basketball player of Cumberland, Maine, who has Down's Syndrome, playing on the Greely High School boys' basketball team.
- Martin Luther King Jr. delivering his August 1963 "I Have a Dream" speech
- Protests about climate change
- The late guitarist Les Paul
- The successful emergency water landing of US Airways Flight 1549 and pilot Chesley Burnett Sullenberger III
- Scenes of the separation stage of a Saturn V rocket along with various astronauts in EVA
- Gloria Steinem and feminist demonstrations.
- Robert F. Kennedy
- Archbishop Desmond Tutu
- 2009–2010 Iranian election protests

For the week ending November 21, the music video for "We Weren't Born to Follow" reached number 1 on the VH1 Top 20 in the USA.

== In popular culture ==
In 2009, TBS used the song in its commercials for that year's Major League Baseball playoffs. Jon Bon Jovi gave a copy of the song to his friend Bill Belichick, head coach of the New England Patriots, before its public release. The Patriots had initially planned to play it after touchdowns at Gillette Stadium, but ultimately chose to use "This Is Our House" instead.

== Track listing ==
United States CD Single
No.	Title	Writer(s)	Length
1.	"We Weren't Born to Follow" (Single Version)	Jon Bon Jovi, Richie Sambora	4:09
Total length:			4:09

Japanese CD Single
No.	Title	Writer(s)	Length
1.	"We Weren't Born to Follow" (Single Version)	Bon Jovi, Sambora	4:09
2.	"We Weren't Born to Follow" (Instrumental)	Bon Jovi, Sambora	4:09
Total length:			8:18

European CD Single
No.	Title	Writer(s)	Length
1.	"We Weren't Born to Follow" (Single Version)	Bon Jovi, Sambora	4:09
2.	"Blaze of Glory" (Recorded live at Madison Square Garden, New York City, July 2008.)	Bon Jovi	5:48
Total length:			9:57

European CD-Maxi Single
No.	Title	Writer(s)	Length
1.	"We Weren't Born to Follow" (Single Version)	Bon Jovi, Sambora	4:09
2.	"Blaze of Glory" (Recorded live at Madison Square Garden, New York City, July 2008.)	Bon Jovi	5:48
3.	"In These Arms" (Recorded live at Madison Square Garden, New York City, July 2008.)	Bon Jovi, Sambora, David Bryan	6:08
4.	"I'll Sleep When I'm Dead" (Recorded live at Madison Square Garden, New York City, July 2008.)	Bon Jovi, Sambora, Desmond Child	6:22
Total length:			22:28

== Personnel ==
Bon Jovi

- Jon Bon Jovi - lead vocals
- Richie Sambora - guitars, backing vocals
- Hugh McDonald - bass guitar, backing vocals
- Tico Torres - drums, percussion
- David Bryan - keyboards, backing vocals

Additional musicians

- Charlie Judge - additional keyboards and strings

Technical personnel

- John Shanks – producer
- Jon Bon Jovi - co-producer
- Richie Sambora - co-producer
- Jeff Rothschild - engineer
- Mike Rew - additional engineer
- Obie O'Brien - additional engineer
- Alex Gibson - additional engineer
- Lars Fox - Pro Tools editor
- Bob Clearmountain - mixing engineer
- Brandon Duncan - mixing assistant
- George Marino - mastering

== Charts ==
=== Weekly charts ===
Chart (2009–2010)	Peak position
Australia (ARIA)	62
Austria (Ö3 Austria Top 40)	4
Canada Hot 100 (Billboard)	29
Czech Republic Airplay (ČNS IFPI)	46
Netherlands (Single Top 100)	73
Finland Download (Latauslista)	25
Germany (GfK)	6
Hungary (Rádiós Top 40)	3
Ireland (IRMA)	41
Italy (FIMI)	5
Japan (Japan Hot 100)	3
Japan (Oricon)	36
Scotland Singles (OCC)	21
Slovakia Airplay (ČNS IFPI)	23
Sweden (Sverigetopplistan)	30
Switzerland (Schweizer Hitparade)	14
UK Singles (OCC)	25
US Billboard Hot 100	68
US Adult Contemporary (Billboard)	16
US Adult Pop Airplay (Billboard)	10

=== Year-end charts ===
Chart (2009)	Position
Austria (Ö3 Austria Top 40)	68
Germany (Official German Charts)	85
Japan (Japan Hot 100)	78
Japan Adult Contemporary (Billboard)	40
US Adult Top 40 (Billboard)	46
Chart (2010)	Position
US Adult Contemporary (Billboard)	41

== Certifications ==
Region	Certification	Certified units/sales
Australia (ARIA)	Gold	35,000^{‡}
^{‡} Sales+streaming figures based on certification alone.

== Release history ==
Region	Date	Label	Format	Catalog
Japan	October 21, 2009	Island	CD	UICL-5026
Europe	October 23, 2009	Island	CD	0602527239415
Europe	October 23, 2009	Island	CD	0602527239408
