= Keep the Faith: An Evening with Bon Jovi =

Video by Bon Jovi
- Released: 1993
- Recorded: October 27, 1992
- Studio: Kaufman's Studios Astoria (Queens, New York City)
- Genre: Rock
- Length: 80 minutes
- Label: Mercury Records

Bon Jovi chronology
Access All Areas: A Rock & Roll Odyssey (1990)	Keep the Faith: An Evening with Bon Jovi (1993)	Keep the Faith: The Videos (1994)

Keep the Faith: An Evening with Bon Jovi is a live concert that aired on MTV in late 1992 prior to the release of the band's then upcoming album Keep the Faith. The performance captures Bon Jovi in an intimate experience, performing acoustic and electric renditions of classic hits (Bon Jovi and non–Bon Jovi tracks), new material from Keep the Faith, and also behind the scenes footage. The show took place at the Kaufman's Studios Astoria in Queens, New York City in 1992. It was released commercially in 1993.

== Track listing ==
1. "With a Little Help From My Friends" (Lennon/McCartney)
2. "Love for Sale" (Bon Jovi/Sambora)
3. "Lay Your Hands on Me" (Bon Jovi/Sambora)
4. "Blaze of Glory" (Bon Jovi)
5. "Little Bit of Soul" (Bon Jovi/Sambora)
6. "Brother Louie" (Brown/Wilson)
7. "Bed of Roses" (Bon Jovi)
8. "Livin' on a Prayer" (Bon Jovi/Sambora/Child)
9. "Fever" (Davenport/Cooley)
10. "We Gotta Get Out of This Place" (Mann/Weil)
11. "It's My Life" (Roger Atkins, Carl D'Errico)
12. "Wanted Dead or Alive" (Bon Jovi/Sambora)
13. "I'll Sleep When I'm Dead" (Bon Jovi/Sambora/Child)
14. "Bad Medicine" (Bon Jovi/Sambora.Child)
15. "Keep the Faith" (Bon Jovi/Sambora/Child)

== Band Personnel ==
- Jon Bon Jovi (lead vocals, guitar, piano, percussion)
- Richie Sambora (guitar, backing vocals)
- David Bryan (keyboards, piano, backing vocals)
- Alec John Such (bass, double bass, backing vocals)
- Tico Torres (drums, percussion, backing vocals on 'Love for Sale')

== Available on the following formats ==
- VHS
- Laserdisc
- CD-i
