= Keep the Faith (disambiguation) =

Keep the Faith is an album by Bon Jovi.

Keep the Faith may also refer to:

== Music ==
- Keep the Faith: An Evening with Bon Jovi, a live television concert
- Keep the Faith: The Videos, a video release by Bon Jovi
- Keep the Faith, a musical produced by the Summer Performing Arts Company

=== Albums ===
- Keep the Faith (Bryn Haworth album)
- Keep the Faith (Faith Evans album), or the title track
- Keep the Faith (Black Oak Arkansas album), or the title track
- Keep the Faith, an album The Business, or the title track
- Keep the Faith, an EP by Georgia Satellites

=== Songs ===
- "Keep the Faith" (Bon Jovi song) (1992)
- "Keep the Faith" (KAT-TUN song)
- "Keep the Faith" (Tamara Gachechiladze song), representing Georgia in the Eurovision Song Contest 2017
- "Keep the Faith", a song by Michael Jackson from Dangerous
- "Keep the Faith", a 1968 song by The American Breed
- "Keep the Faith", a 2004 song by Special D. from Reckless

== Other uses ==
- Keep the Faith, a 1972 American comedy TV movie starring Bert Convy

== See also ==
- Keep the Faith, Baby!, a spoken-word album by Adam Clayton Powell Jr.
- Keeping the Faith (disambiguation)
- "...I have kept the faith", an excerpt from the Second Epistle to Timothy
