= What Do You Got? =

2010 single by Bon Jovi

Single by Bon Jovi

from the album Greatest Hits
- Released: August 27, 2010
- Studio: Bay 7 Studios, Valley Village, California; Sparky Dark Studios, Calabasas, California
- Genre: Country rock, pop rock
- Length: 3:47
- Label: Island
- Songwriters: Jon Bon Jovi, Richie Sambora, Brett James
- Producers: Howard Benson, Bon Jovi (co-producer), Sambora (co-producer)

Bon Jovi singles chronology
"When We Were Beautiful" (2010)	"What Do You Got?" (2010)	"No Apologies" (2011)

Music video
- What Do You Got? on YouTube

"What Do You Got?" is a song by American rock band Bon Jovi. It is one of four songs written for the band's Greatest Hits album, released in November 2010. The song is the first single from the compilation album. The song was released on the band's official website on August 27. It was also released to radio airplay on August 27. It was officially released on September 21, 2010 as a digital download, but the physical single was released in Germany on October 22, 2010.

== Background and lyrical content ==
"What Do You Got?" was written by Jon Bon Jovi, Richie Sambora and Brett James, produced by Howard Benson and co-produced by Jon Bon Jovi and Sambora. It was recorded in Bay 7 Studios in Valley Village and Sparky Dark Studios in Calabasas, California. The song was written during sessions for The Circle (2009), but it didn't fit that album, so band decided to hold it and finished it for the Greatest Hits (2010).

Lyrically, the song is about the aesthetics of love. Richie Sambora explained: "It's a worldly thing and it doesn't have to be exactly about romance. It could be about with your family, daughter or son. What do you got if you ain't got love. It's a profound statement in its simplicity."

== Music video ==
The music video was directed by Wayne Isham and produced by Dana Marshall. Isham explained: "I dug the 3D process, and it was awesome to execute it with long-time friends and collaborators Bon Jovi. We've worked together a long time, evolving and growing, so I'm happy to continue that tradition with the new medium of 3D".

== Release and reception ==
Originally, Jon Bon Jovi didn't want to release "What Do You Got?" as the first single and instead favored "No Apologies". He said: "If anyone wants to pick a single, you tell me. What do I know? That was the one that floated to the top, and I was taken aback because it was the (last) of the five I would've picked. But people have really been relating to the lyric, and seemingly for...radio, it's a hit."

Stephen Thomas Erlewine from Allmusic said that "What Do You Got?" and "No Apologies" "will likely not make any subsequent best-of". Mike Diver from BBC said that the song is a "by-the-book slowie worthy of a few lighters held aloft". Glenn Osrin from Examiner.com said the song "artistically is as slick, smooth and musically competent as fans expect of Bon Jovi". He also stated that "Jon's voice is crisp and clear, up in front in the mix; and Richie Sambora's guitar work is neat, clean, and growing more minimal by the minute". Describing the composition, Osrin said that song "continues the band's trend of recording music that tries to be more socially conscious than rollicking".

== Track listing ==
U.S. CD single
No.	Title	Writer(s)	Length
1.	"What Do You Got?"	Jon Bon Jovi, Richie Sambora, Brett James	3:46
Total length:			3:46

German CD single
No.	Title	Writer(s)	Length
1.	"What Do You Got?"	Bon Jovi, Sambora, James	3:46
2.	"Wanted Dead or Alive" (Live from New Meadowlands Stadium)	Bon Jovi, Sambora	7:09
Total length:			10:57

German CD Maxi single
No.	Title	Writer(s)	Length
1.	"What Do You Got?"	Bon Jovi, Sambora, James	3:46
2.	"Livin' on a Prayer" (Live from New Meadowlands Stadium)	Bon Jovi, Sambora, Desmond Child	7:21
3.	"Born to Be My Baby" (Live from New Meadowlands Stadium)	Bon Jovi, Sambora, Child	5:16
4.	"What Do You Got?" (Music video)	Bon Jovi, Sambora, James	3:52
Total length:			20:23

== Personnel ==
Songwriting and production

- Jon Bon Jovi – writer, co-producer
- Richie Sambora – writer, co-producer
- Brett James – writer
- Howard Benson – producer
- Mike Plotnikoff – recording engineer
- Chris Lord-Alge – mixing engineer

Musicians

- Jon Bon Jovi – lead vocals, rhythm guitar
- Richie Sambora – lead guitar, harmony vocals
- David Bryan – keyboards, backing vocals
- Tico Torres – drums, percussion
- Hugh McDonald – bass guitar, backing vocals

== Chart performance ==
=== Weekly charts ===
Chart (2010–11)	Peak position
Austria (Ö3 Austria Top 40)	30
Canada Hot 100 (Billboard)	23
Canada AC (Billboard)	2
Canada Hot AC (Billboard)	29
European Hot 100 Singles	79
Germany (GfK)	23
Hungary (Editors' Choice Top 40)	40
Japan (Japan Hot 100)	43
Slovakia Airplay (ČNS IFPI)	77
Spain Airplay (PROMUSICAE)	20
US Adult Contemporary (Billboard)	8
US Adult Pop Airplay (Billboard)	16
US Bubbling Under Hot 100 Singles (Billboard)	2

=== Year-end charts ===
Chart (2010)	Position
Taiwan (Hito Radio)	38

Chart (2011)	Position
US Adult Contemporary (Billboard)	27

== Releases ==
Country	Date	Type
Austria	August 27, 2010	Radio airplay
United States/Canada	August 27, 2010	Radio airplay
Malaysia	August 31, 2010	Radio airplay
United Kingdom	September 4, 2010	Radio airplay
United States	September 21, 2010	Digital download
Germany	October 15, 2010	CD single

== In TV ==
"What Do You Got?" was used in a promotional video for Grey's Anatomy in Canada.
