= Never Say Die (Jon Bon Jovi song) =

Single by Jon Bon Jovi

from the album Blaze of Glory
- B-side: "Justice in the Barrel"
- Released: March 25, 1991
- Genre: Hard rock
- Songwriter: Jon Bon Jovi

Jon Bon Jovi singles chronology
| "Miracle" (1990) | "Never Say Die" (1991) | "Midnight in Chelsea" (1997) |

"Never Say Die" is the third solo single by American rock singer Jon Bon Jovi. It was released in March 1991 from his debut album Blaze of Glory, the soundtrack album from the film Young Guns II.

== Release and Promotion ==
The single was only ever released in three countries; Poland, Canada and Australia. In Poland it became a Top20 hit peaking at No.17. In Australia it entered the charts on April 7, 1991 and peaked at number 60 during a four-week run.

== Charts ==
| Chart (1991) | Peak position |
|---|---|
| Australia (ARIA Charts) | 60 |
| Canada Top Singles (RPM) | 86 |
