= Lunar eclipse (disambiguation) =

A lunar eclipse occurs whenever the moon passes behind the earth such that the earth blocks the sun's rays from striking the moon.

Lunar Eclipse may also refer to:

- Lunar Eclipse (album), an album by David Bryan from the band Bon Jovi
- Lunar Eclipse (film), a 1999 Chinese film
- "Lunar Eclipse" (Moonlighting), a series finale of Moonlighting

== See also ==
- List of lunar eclipses
