= Best of Bon Jovi =

Best of Bon Jovi can refer to:

- Hard & Hot (Best of Bon Jovi), a 1991 compilation album
- Tokyo Road: Best of Bon Jovi, a 2001 compilation album
