= Miracle (Jon Bon Jovi song) =

1990 single by Bon Jovi

Single by Jon Bon Jovi

from the album Blaze of Glory
- B-side: "Blood Money"
- Released: 1990
- Genre: Rock
- Length: 5:20
- Label: Mercury, Vertigo
- Songwriter: Jon Bon Jovi
- Producers: Jon Bon Jovi, Danny Kortchmar

Jon Bon Jovi singles chronology
"Blaze of Glory" (1990)	"Miracle" (1990)	"Never Say Die" (1991)

"Miracle" is the second solo single by American rock singer Jon Bon Jovi. It was released in 1990 from his debut album, Blaze of Glory, the soundtrack album from the film Young Guns II. The song charted at No. 12 on both the US Billboard Hot 100 and Cash Box and No. 20 on the Album Rock Tracks charts.

== Music video ==
The music video for the song features Jeff Beck on guitars and stars Matt LeBlanc in one of his earliest acting appearances. The music video was filmed at the Veluzat Motion Picture Ranch in Saugus, California. The video features the ranch's church and small town.

== Track listings ==
US and Canadian 7-inch single (878 392-7)

1. "Miracle" – 5:08
2. "Blood Money" – 2:34

UK CD single (878 523-2)

1. "Miracle" – 5:08
2. "Bang a Drum" – 4:43
3. "Going Back" (live) – 4:07

UK limited-edition 12-inch picture disc (JBJP 212; 878 591-1)

1. "Miracle" – 5:08
2. "Dyin' Ain't Much of a Livin'" – 4:39
3. "Going Back" (live) – 4:07

UK limited-edition 12-inch picture disc with poster (JBJ 212)

1. "Miracle" – 5:08
2. "Dyin' Ain't Much of a Livin'" – 4:39
3. "8 Minute Interview with Jon Bon Jovi" – 7:40 (Interview taken from the Radio One 'Saturday Sequence' broadcast on 11th August 1990. Released by arrangement with BBC Enterprises Ltd.)

Japanese CD single (PHCR-8006)

1. "Miracle" – 4:37
2. "Dyin' Ain't Much of a Livin'" – 4:31
3. "Going Back" (live) – 4:07
4. "Miracle" (edit version) – 4:34

== Charts ==
=== Weekly charts ===
Chart (1990–1991)	Peak position
Australia (ARIA)	8
Canada Top Singles (RPM)	6
Europe (Eurochart Hot 100)	64
Finland (Suomen virallinen lista)	20
Ireland (IRMA)	20
Netherlands (Single Top 100)	65
Sweden (Sverigetopplistan)	15
Switzerland (Schweizer Hitparade)	20
UK Singles (Official Charts)	29
US Billboard Hot 100	12
US Mainstream Rock (Billboard)	20
West Germany (GfK)	47

Chart (2007)	Peak position
US Digital Song Sales (Billboard)	45

=== Year-end charts ===
Chart (1990)	Position
Canada Top Singles (RPM)	69
Sweden (Topplistan)	98

== Release history ==
Region	Date	Format(s)	Label(s)	Ref.
United States	1990	7-inch vinyl; cassette	Mercury	
United Kingdom	October 29, 1990	7-inch vinyl; 12-inch vinyl; cassette	Vertigo	
Japan	November 5, 1990	Mini-CD	Mercury	
Japan	January 25, 1991	CD	Mercury	
