= Keeping the Faith (disambiguation) =

Keeping the Faith is a 2000 film directed, produced by and starring Edward Norton.

Keeping the Faith may also refer to:

- "Keeping the Faith" (song), a 1983 song by Billy Joel from the album An Innocent Man
- "Keepin' the Faith", a song by De La Soul from the album De La Soul Is Dead
- "Keeping the Faith", a song by Mary Chapin Carpenter from the album A Place in the World
- "Keeping the Faith", a song by Lynyrd Skynyrd from the album Lynyrd Skynyrd 1991
- Keeping the Faith: Stories of Love, Courage, Healing, and Hope from Black America, a book by Tavis Smiley
- Keepin' the Faith, a 1993 album by Steve Laury
- Keeping the Faith!, a 2004 graphic novel by Tom DeFalco
- A reference to the Bible, 2 Timothy 4:7, "I have fought a good fight, I have finished my course, I have kept the faith"

== See also ==
- Keep the Faith (disambiguation)
