= Superman Tonight =

Single by Bon Jovi

from the album The Circle
- Released: 25 January 2010 (Radio); 1 February 2010 (Itunes)
- Studio: Sanctuary Studios, NJ; Henson Recording Studios, CA
- Length: 5:13 (Album Version); 4:07 (Radio Edit)
- Label: Island
- Songwriters: Jon Bon Jovi, Richie Sambora, Billy Falcon
- Producer: John Shanks

Bon Jovi singles chronology
"We Weren't Born to Follow" (2009)	"Superman Tonight" (2010)	"When We Were Beautiful" (2010)

"Superman Tonight" is a song by American rock band Bon Jovi. It is the second single release from the band's eleventh studio album The Circle. The single was released on January 25, 2010. On December 12, 2009, Bon Jovi performed the song on Saturday Night Live.

== Music video ==
The video premiered on Vevo on Wednesday, February 3, followed by a television premiere on VH1 on Saturday, February 6. It features the band performing in an inflatable tunnel (which resembles the cover for The Circle). Parts of it show a tribute to everyday "superheroes".

== In television ==
"Superman Tonight" was one of the songs used in the soundtrack of WWE's Tribute to the Troops 2009 show for the ending highlights. Bon Jovi performed the song live on the American Idol results show on May 12, 2010. A highlight of "Superman Tonight" was used on USA Network and featured the USA shows such as In Plain Sight, Royal Pains, Psych, White Collar, and Law & Order: Criminal Intent.

== Track listing ==
European CD Single (Island: 0602527320496)
No.	Title	Writer(s)	Length
1.	"Superman Tonight" (Album version)	Jon Bon Jovi, Richie Sambora, Billy Falcon	5:12
2.	"We Weren't Born to Follow" (Recorded live at BBC Radio Theatre on November 3, 2009.)	Bon Jovi, Sambora	4:23
Total length:			9:37

European CD-Maxi Single (Island: 0602527320489)
No.	Title	Writer(s)	Length
1.	"Superman Tonight" (Album version)	Bon Jovi, Sambora, Falcon	5:12
2.	"We Weren't Born to Follow" (Recorded live at BBC Radio Theatre on November 3, 2009.)	Bon Jovi, Sambora	4:23
3.	"Superman Tonight" (Recorded live at BBC Radio Theatre on November 3, 2009.)	Bon Jovi, Sambora, Falcon	5:28
4.	"Livin' on a Prayer" (Recorded acoustic live at BBC Radio Theatre on November 3, 2009.)	Bon Jovi, Sambora, Desmond Child	6:36
Total length:			21:41

== Charts ==
=== Weekly charts ===
Chart (2010)	Peak Position
Austria (Ö3 Austria Top 40)	44
European Hot 100 Singles	91
Germany (GfK)	26
US Adult Pop Airplay (Billboard)	15
US Rock Digital Songs (Billboard)	42

=== Year-end charts ===
Chart (2010)	Position
US Adult Top 40 (Billboard)	50
