= The Circle (Bon Jovi album) =

Studio album by Bon Jovi
- Released: November 10, 2009
- Recorded: 2008–09
- Studios: Henson (Hollywood, California); Sanctuary Sound II (New Jersey)
- Genres: Hard rock; pop rock
- Length: 52:49
- Labels: Island; Mercury
- Producers: John Shanks; Jon Bon Jovi; Richie Sambora

Bon Jovi chronology
Lost Highway (2007)	The Circle (2009)	Greatest Hits (2010)

Singles from The Circle
- 1. "We Weren't Born to Follow" Released: August 31, 2009; 2. "Superman Tonight" Released: January 25, 2010; 3. "When We Were Beautiful" Released: May 20, 2010

The Circle is the eleventh studio album by American rock band Bon Jovi. Released on November 10, 2009, the album was produced by John Shanks. The album debuted at number 1 in several countries, including the U.S., where it sold 163,000 copies in its first week.

The Circle marks the band's return to their hard rock sound after a brief venture into country music with their previous album Lost Highway.

== Recording and production ==
In an interview given to Rolling Stone, former Bon Jovi guitarist Richie Sambora says the album is a return to "rock and roll" and said "There’s going to be some big choruses on there. It sounds like Bon Jovi, but it sounds fresh. We experimented with a lot of new sounds and had a really good time working with John Shanks, who is also a really good guitar player, so he and I did a lot of ‘weaseling’ with the guitar sounds. There are a lot of really good guitar sounds and new kind atmospheres on the new Bon Jovi record, that I think makes it really modern. I think people are going to dig it, man. And it rocks hard."

In an interview on UK radio station Absolute Radio, Jon Bon Jovi stated the album title has multiple meanings. It stands for the fact that a circle is never ending, and that it also refers to Bon Jovi's inner circle – stating that "in this organization, the circle is very difficult to get into, and even more difficult to get out of."

The lead single, "We Weren't Born to Follow" is about the tough times we are experiencing in this economic crisis. "Superman Tonight" was released as the second single followed by "When We Were Beautiful" as the third single, all of which featuring music videos. Work For The Working Man which was released as a promo single was also written about the DHL plant that closed in Ohio. Before the official release of the album, U.S. President Barack Obama's chief adviser David Axelrod had the lyrics to "Work for the Working Man" framed and hung in his White House office.

The album is the first record since 1988's New Jersey not to feature bonus tracks (all the subsequent albums from 1992's Keep the Faith through to 2007's Lost Highway have included songs not available in the United States). Lead singer Jon Bon Jovi has stated that there were one or two songs that he left off the album that could have been bonus tracks which he wanted to keep for the Greatest Hits album.

== Release and reception ==
Professional ratings
Aggregate scores
Source	Rating
Metacritic	52/100
Review scores
Source	Rating
AllMusic	2/5 stars
Billboard	4/5 stars
Entertainment Weekly	C
Los Angeles Times	1.5/4 stars
Rolling Stone	3/5 stars
The Boston Globe	(mixed)

The Circle received mixed reviews from critics. At Metacritic, which assigns a normalized rating out of 100 to reviews from mainstream critics, the album has an average score of 52 out of 100, which indicates "mixed or average reviews" based on 10 reviews. Stephen Thomas Erlewine from AllMusic gave the album 2 stars out of 5 stating that "A knack for oversized choruses remains hardwired in Bon Jovi, but in this gloomy context, they act as reminders that they once sounded like they were a working band for working men instead of rich men fretting about a world they've long left behind". Gary Graff from Billboard gave the album 4 out of 5 stars saying that "The New Jersey group gets back to the business of rocking on its 11th studio album, The Circle". Whitney Pastorek from Entertainment Weekly gave the album C grade by saying "Between cliches and Jon's strained voice, The Circle just feels tired". Mikael Wood from Los Angeles Times gave the album 1.5 stars out of 4 stating that "The Circle shows off Bon Jovi's still-sharp knack for wedding blandly optimistic sentiments to predictably soaring choruses. Unfortunately, it's getting pretty hard to tell one song from the next". Christian Hoard from Rolling Stone gave the album 3 stars out of 5 by saying "It does rock--if your idea of rock is Aerosmith doing Diane Warren songs". Scott McLennan from The Boston Globe made a mixed review about the album stating that "Slick production and beer-ad bombast grease these 12 tracks. Lead singer Jon Bon Jovi has yet to meet a cliche he can’t work into a song".

The album topped the Billboard 200 chart when it debuted, but by the next week, it suddenly dropped to number 19.

The Circle debuted at the number-one position with sales of around 67,000 copies on the Japanese Oricon weekly album charts, becoming their fifth number-one album on the Japanese chart. Because of the album's number-one debut, Bon Jovi tied the Oricon charts' record for having five number-one albums as a Western artist, which was held by Mariah Carey and Simon & Garfunkel.

== Track listing ==
No.	Title	Writer(s)	Length
1.	"We Weren't Born to Follow"	Jon Bon Jovi; Richie Sambora	4:03
2.	"When We Were Beautiful"	Bon Jovi; Sambora; Billy Falcon	5:18
3.	"Work for the Working Man"	Bon Jovi; Sambora; Darrell Brown	4:04
4.	"Superman Tonight"	Bon Jovi; Sambora; Falcon	5:12
5.	"Bullet"	Bon Jovi; Sambora	3:50
6.	"Thorn in My Side"	Bon Jovi; Sambora	4:05
7.	"Live Before You Die"	Bon Jovi; Sambora	4:17
8.	"Brokenpromiseland"	Bon Jovi; Sambora; John Shanks; Desmond Child	4:57
9.	"Love's the Only Rule"	Bon Jovi; Sambora; Falcon	4:38
10.	"Fast Cars"	Bon Jovi; Sambora; Child	3:16
11.	"Happy Now"	Bon Jovi; Sambora; Child	4:21
12.	"Learn to Love"	Bon Jovi; Sambora; Child	4:39
Total length:			52:47

iTunes bonus track
No.	Title	Writer(s)	Length
13.	"We Weren't Born to Follow" (Jason Nevins remix)	Bon Jovi; Sambora	4:03

2010 special edition bonus tracks (international only)
No.	Title	Writer(s)	Length
13.	"We Weren't Born to Follow" (live)	Bon Jovi; Sambora	4:02
14.	"When We Were Beautiful" (live)	Bon Jovi; Sambora; Falcon	5:21
15.	"Superman Tonight" (live)	Bon Jovi; Sambora; Falcon	5:24
16.	"Love's the Only Rule" (live)	Bon Jovi; Sambora; Falcon	8:59

== Personnel ==
Bon Jovi

- Jon Bon Jovi – lead vocals
- Richie Sambora – guitars, backing vocals
- David Bryan – keyboards
- Tico Torres – drums, percussion

Additional musicians

- Charlie Judge – additional keyboards and strings
- Hugh McDonald – bass guitar

Technical personnel

- John Shanks – producer
- Jon Bon Jovi – co-producer
- Richie Sambora – co-producer
- Jeff Rothschild – engineer
- Mike Rew – additional engineer
- Obie O'Brien – additional engineer
- Alex Gibson – additional engineer
- Lars Fox – Pro Tools editing
- Bob Clearmountain – mixing
- Brandon Duncan – mixing assistant
- George Marino – mastering
- Kevin Westenberg – band photography
- Kirk Edwards Photography – additional photography
- Andy West Design – art direction and design
- Lynne Bugai – album title and design
- Carol Corless – package producer

== Charts ==
=== Weekly charts ===
Chart (2009)	Peak position
Australian Albums (ARIA)	4
Austrian Albums (Ö3 Austria)	2
Belgian Albums (Ultratop Flanders)	31
Belgian Albums (Ultratop Wallonia)	39
Canadian Albums (Billboard)	1
Czech Albums (ČNS IFPI)	11
Danish Albums (Hitlisten)	18
Dutch Albums (Album Top 100)	4
European Albums (Billboard)	2
Finnish Albums (Suomen virallinen lista)	6
French Albums (SNEP)	39
German Albums (Offizielle Top 100)	1
Hungarian Albums (MAHASZ)	11
Irish Albums (IRMA)	7
Italian Albums (FIMI)	13
Japanese Albums (Oricon)	1
Mexican Albums (Top 100 Mexico)	38
New Zealand Albums (RMNZ)	20
Norwegian Albums (VG-lista)	14
Portuguese Albums (AFP)	5
Scottish Albums (Official Charts)	1
Swiss Albums (Schweizer Hitparade)	1
Swedish Albums (Sverigetopplistan)	9
Spanish Albums (Promusicae)	3
UK Albums (Official Charts)	2
UK Album Downloads (Official Charts)	3
US Billboard 200	1
US Digital Albums (Billboard)	1
US Top Rock Albums (Billboard)	1
US Indie Store Album Sales (Billboard)	3

=== Year-end charts ===
Chart (2009)	Position
Australian Albums (ARIA)	86
Austrian Albums (Ö3 Austria)	35
German Albums (Offizielle Top 100)	62
Swiss Albums (Schweizer Hitparade)	49
UK Albums (OCC)	79
US Billboard 200	189
US Top Rock Albums (Billboard)	44

Chart (2010)	Position
Canadian Albums (Billboard)	35
US Billboard 200	88
US Top Rock Albums (Billboard)	21

== Certifications ==
Region	Certification	Certified units/sales
Australia (ARIA)	Gold	35,000^{^}
Canada (Music Canada)	Platinum	80,000^{^}
Germany (BVMI)	Gold	100,000^{^}
Japan (RIAJ)	Gold	100,000^{^}
Switzerland (IFPI Switzerland)	Gold	15,000^{^}
United Kingdom (BPI)	Gold	100,000^{^}
United States (RIAA)	Gold	500,000^{^}
^{^} Shipments figures based on certification alone.

== Release history ==
Region	Date	Label	Format	Catalog
Japan	November 4, 2009	Island	CD	UICL-1092
Japan	March 20, 2013	Universal Music International	SHM-CD	UICY-20458
Japan	November 18, 2016	Island	double LP	470-3095
