= Damon Marks =

American songwriter (born 1971)

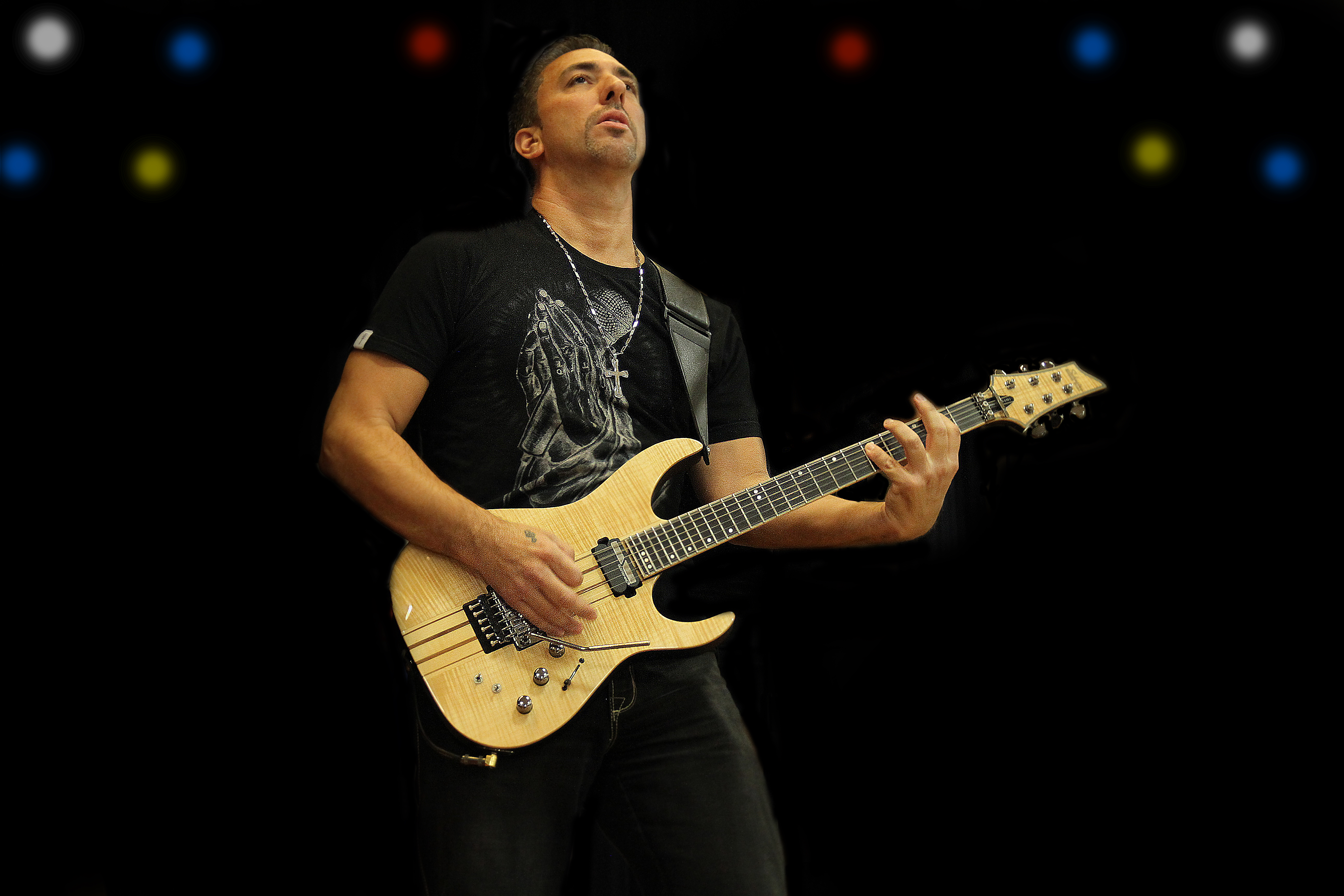
- Damon Marks in 2016

Background information
- Born: October 6, 1971 (age 55); Elizabeth, New Jersey, U.S.
- Genres: Hard rock, heavy metal, R&B
- Occupations: Musician, songwriter, Philanthropist
- Instruments: Guitar, vocals
- Years active: 1990–present
- Website: damonmarks.com

Damon Marks (born October 6, 1971) is an American professional rock and roll guitarist, songwriter, record producer, and philanthropist. Marks is the founder of the Traveling Guitar Foundation, a non-profit that supplies underfunded school systems with support and musical instruments. He is a spokesman for Merida Guitars and has performed with such artists as Alicia Keys and Bret Michaels.

== Equipment ==
Damon presently holds full artist endorsements with Schecter Guitar Research and EMG, Inc. Damon primarily uses the Schecter Banshee Elite-6 FR S with the new sustainiac supercharger pickup system and the Hellraiser Hybrid C-1 FR with EMG Pickups 57/66.

He also endorses the hand crafted Mérida Guitars DG15-SPGACES Diana Series Guitar and the T25-CES Trajan Series Nylon String Guitar.

== Discography (with Lipstick Magazine) ==
- Skin Deep – released August 5, 2008 via Nightmare Records
- Live in NYC – released April 28, 2008 via Lipstick Magazine
- "Skin Deep" – from Skin Deep, released 2008

== Discography (with Livre') ==
- Jericho: Tribe of Joshua - released May 20, 2016, via Sony Music Entertainment

== Traveling Guitar Foundation ==
In 2009, Damon founded the Traveling Guitar Foundation, a 501(c)(3) nonprofit organization that works to ensure that school children have access to high-quality musical instruments and instruction. By partnering with such sponsors as Schecter Guitars, Merida Guitars, and Blackstar Amplification, the foundation donates new instruments to underfunded schools nationally and internationally. David Bryan, keyboardist and founding member of Bon Jovi, has served on the Traveling Guitar Foundation's board of directors. By 2015, the foundation had equipped 70 schools and 30,000 students with musical equipment.

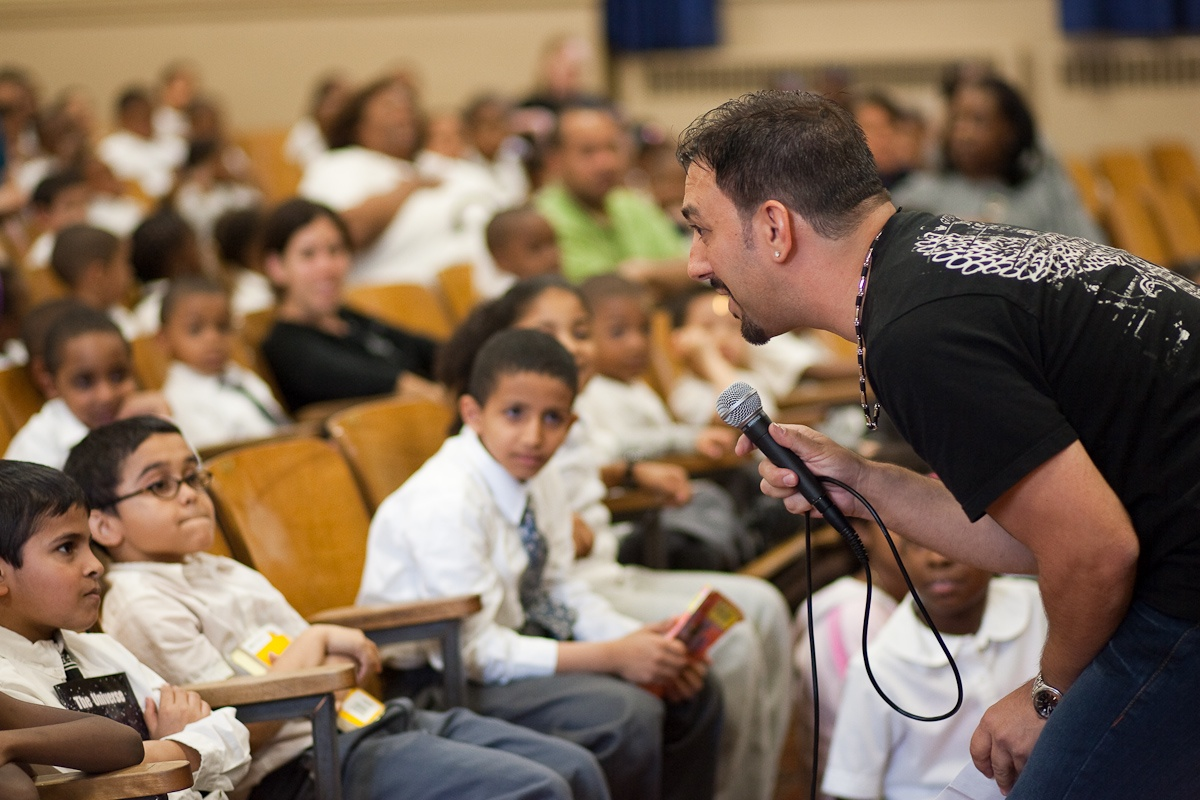
Damon Marks talking with students about the importance of music education.

In early 2013, Damon went on his first celebrity USO tour.On October 24, 2014, Marks was presented with a street sign at a ceremony by Mayor Christian Bollwage of the city of Elizabeth, NJ where he grew up.

On May 13, 2016, Marks was presented with a second street sign at a ceremony by Mayor Barbara McMorrow of the city of Freehold, NJ recognizing him for his contributions to the education of our children through his foundation. Marks was also presented with a proclamation that on Saturday May 15, 2016, being declared Damon Marks / Traveling Guitar Foundation day.
