= On a Full Moon =

Studio album by David Bryan
- Released: September 5, 1995
- Genre: Classical
- Length: 48:34
- Label: Ignition Records

David Bryan chronology
Netherworld Soundtrack (1992)	On a Full Moon (1995)	Lunar Eclipse (2000)

On a Full Moon is the solo debut album by David Bryan from the band Bon Jovi. It is an instrumental CD released on September 5, 1995.

== Track listing ==
On a Full Moon track listing
No.	Title	Length
1.	"Awakening"	0:29
2.	"It's a Long Road"	4:10
3.	"On a Full Moon"	3:55
4.	"April"	3:38
5.	"Kissed by an Angel"	3:22
6.	"Endless Horizon"	4:13
7.	"In These Arms"	3:41
8.	"Lullaby for Two Moons"	3:42
9.	"Interlude"	0:56
10.	"Midnight Voodoo"	2:10
11.	"Room Full of Blues"	2:47
12.	"Hear Our Prayer"	3:34
13.	"Summer of Dreams"	3:35
14.	"Up the River"	2:53
15.	"Netherworld Waltz"	5:29
