= Lunar Eclipse (album) =

Studio album by David Bryan
- Released: 2000
- Genre: Instrumental
- Length: 55:37
- Label: Rounder, UMGD

David Bryan chronology
On a Full Moon (1995)	Lunar Eclipse (2000)

Lunar Eclipse is the second solo album by David Bryan of the band Bon Jovi. The album features all the songs from his first album, On a Full Moon, released in 1995, except for "Awakening" and "Midnight Voodoo", which were replaced by two new tracks, "Second Chance" and "I Can Love".

== Track listing ==
No.	Title	Length
1.	"Second Chance"	3:40
2.	"I Can Love"	4:39
3.	"It's a Long Road"	4:10
4.	"On a Full Moon"	3:55
5.	"April"	3:38
6.	"Kissed by an Angel"	3:22
7.	"Endless Horizon"	4:13
8.	"Lullaby for Two Moons"	3:42
9.	"Interlude"	0:56
10.	"Room Full of Blues"	2:47
11.	"Hear Our Prayer"	3:34
12.	"Summer of Dreams"	3:35
13.	"Up the River"	2:53
14.	"Netherworld Waltz"	5:29
15.	"In These Arms" (Vocal Version)	5:04
