= Keep the Faith =

Studio album by Bon Jovi
- Released: November 3, 1992
- Recorded: January–August 1992
- Studios: Little Mountain (Vancouver, Canada)
- Genre: Hard rock
- Length: 65:04
- Label: Mercury
- Producer: Bob Rock

Bon Jovi chronology
Hard & Hot (Best of Bon Jovi) (1991)	Keep the Faith (1992)	Cross Road (1994)

Singles from Keep the Faith
- 1. "Keep the Faith" Released: October 7, 1992; 2. "Bed of Roses" Released: January 11, 1993; 3. "In These Arms" Released: May 3, 1993; 4. "I'll Sleep When I'm Dead" Released: July 26, 1993; 5. "I Believe" Released: September 20, 1993; 6. "Dry County" Released: March 7, 1994

Keep the Faith is the fifth studio album by American rock band Bon Jovi. Released on November 3, 1992 by Mercury Records, Produced by Bob Rock, and recorded at the Little Mountain Sound Studios in Vancouver, British Columbia, it is the band's last studio album to include all five original band members. Bass guitarist Alec John Such was dismissed from the band in 1994, though it was not his last release with the band. Keep the Faith marked a change to a "more serious interpretation of the band's pop-metal groove". It is Bon Jovi's longest album to date, clocking in at 66 minutes.

Keep the Faith peaked at number five on the US Billboard 200 chart and was certified double-platinum by the Recording Industry Association of America (RIAA). The album produced several hits for the band, including "Keep the Faith", "Bed of Roses" and "In These Arms".

== Background ==
Following the completion of the New Jersey tour, the band went on hiatus. During their time off, Jon Bon Jovi wrote the soundtrack for Young Guns II, which was released in 1990 as the Blaze of Glory album and Richie Sambora released his first solo album called Stranger in This Town. By this time, Jon Bon Jovi fired his longtime manager, Doc McGhee and created Bon Jovi Management. Jon Bon Jovi decided to take on a larger role, and more responsibilities within the band. In October 1991 the band went to the Caribbean island of St. Thomas to discuss plans for the future; the band's internal problems were solved and they were ready to have a go at a comeback.

== Recording and production ==
In January 1992, the band headed to Little Mountain Studios in Vancouver, British Columbia. They spent seven months making the album with Bob Rock producing. Originally, the band had approached Bruce Fairbairn, who produced Slippery When Wet and New Jersey, but he was working on Aerosmith's Get a Grip at the time. Most of the recording was done in Vancouver, although a couple of tracks and overdubs were laid down in Los Angeles.

"When we got back together in a room in Vancouver," noted Jon Bon Jovi in 2007, "we closed the door and ignored what had happened to our genre of music. We'd been kicked in the teeth by Nirvana, but we didn't pay attention to that. We got rid of the clichés, wrote some socially conscious lyrics and got a haircut. I didn't do a grunge thing and I didn't do a rap thing. But I knew I couldn't re-write 'Livin' on a Prayer' again, so I didn't try. And it paid off."

Of the thirty songs written for the album, a couple were co-written by David Bryan and a couple by Desmond Child; the rest being by Jon Bon Jovi/Richie Sambora compositions and by Bon Jovi alone. Fourteen songs made it to the final album. Jon Bon Jovi wrote half of the album's songs alone.

Before the band reunited in the studio, Bon Jovi spent the summer of 1991 in anonymity, riding his motorbike in places like Arizona, gaining experiences that inspired him to write "Dry County" and "Bed of Roses". He later commented "It would never have been possible [for me] to write songs like 'Bed of Roses' or 'Dry County' five years ago."

== Release and reception ==
Professional ratings
Review scores
Source	Rating
AllMusic	3/5 stars
Entertainment Weekly	D
The Rolling Stone Album Guide	2.5/5 stars

Keep the Faith was released on November 3, 1992. To promote the album, Bon Jovi returned to their roots playing a few dates at the small New Jersey clubs where they had started their career. The band appeared on MTV Unplugged, a different show from the other episodes of the MTV Unplugged series, capturing Bon Jovi in an intimate, "in the round" experience, performing acoustic and electric renditions of classic hits (Bon Jovi and non-Bon Jovi tracks) and new material from Keep the Faith. The concert was released commercially in 1993 as Keep the Faith: An Evening with Bon Jovi.

The album was released on high-definition SACD in August 2017.

== Commercial performance ==
In the US, Keep the Faith debuted at number five on the Billboard 200 Top Albums in November 1992 while peaking at number one in the UK and Australia. Six singles were released from the album between November 1992 and April 1994, with four singles issued in the United States, and two others released only outside the US.

== Promotion ==
=== Singles ===
The album's first single, "Keep the Faith", was released on October 7, 1992, a month before the album. On the US Billboard charts, the song topped the Billboard Mainstream Rock Tracks chart while reaching number twenty nine on the Billboard Hot 100; elsewhere, it reached top ten on the singles charts in UK, Ireland, Canada, Switzerland, Germany, Sweden, Norway, the Netherlands and Australia.

"Bed of Roses" was released as the second single on January 11, 1993. On the US Billboard charts, the song reached number ten on the Hot 100. Elsewhere, it reached number two in Canada and number ten in Australia and Germany. Three more commercial singles were released in 1993. "In These Arms", released on May 3, reached number six in Canada, number nine in the UK, and number ten in Australia and Ireland. It reached the Top 40 in the US Billboard Hot 100. "I'll Sleep When I'm Dead", released on July 26, reached number seventeen in the UK. "I Believe" was released on September 20, reaching number eleven on the UK Singles Chart in October. On March 7, 1994, the album's last single, "Dry County", was released; it reached number nine on the UK Singles Chart. In October 1994, the album was certified double platinum by the Recording Industry Association of America (RIAA).

Keep the Faith is the third most-represented album in Bon Jovi's concert setlists behind Slippery When Wet and New Jersey. This representation is due entirely to the singles, of which "I'll Sleep When I'm Dead" and the title track have been live staples. Of the pure album tracks, "Blame It on the Love of Rock and Roll" and "I Want You" were each only played once during 1993, whilst "If I Was Your Mother" was performed live only twice during the Keep the Faith Tour and not subsequently. "Little Bit of Soul" has appeared live only twice during special radio sessions and Bon Jovi have performed "Fear" live only six times, all during the French and Spanish legs of the album's supporting tour in April 1993.

== Accolades ==
Publication	Country	Accolade	Year	Rank
Kerrang!	United Kingdom	Top 100 Albums You Must Listen Before You Die	1998	21
Classic Rock & Metal Hammer	United Kingdom	Top 200 Albums of 90s	2006	*

(*) designates unordered lists.

== Track listing ==
All tracks are written by Jon Bon Jovi, except where noted.

International edition
No.	Title	Writer(s)	Length
1.	"I Believe"		5:48
2.	"Keep the Faith"	Bon Jovi; Richie Sambora; Desmond Child	5:46
3.	"I'll Sleep When I'm Dead"	Bon Jovi; Sambora; Child	4:42
4.	"In These Arms"	Bon Jovi; Sambora; David Bryan	5:19
5.	"Bed of Roses"		6:33
6.	"If I Was Your Mother"	Bon Jovi; Sambora	4:27
7.	"Dry County"		9:51
8.	"Woman in Love"		3:48
9.	"Fear"		3:06
10.	"I Want You"		5:36
11.	"Blame It on the Love of Rock & Roll"	Bon Jovi; Sambora	4:24
12.	"Little Bit of Soul"	Bon Jovi; Sambora	5:44
13.	"Save a Prayer" (European bonus track)	Bon Jovi; Sambora	5:57
Total length:			65:04

Japanese and Australian edition bonus track
No.	Title	Writer(s)	Length
14.	"Starting All Over Again"	Bon Jovi; Sambora; Child	3:47
Total length:			74:48

Keep the Faith – Live (bonus disc)
No.	Title	Writer(s)	Length
1.	"Keep the Faith" (recorded live in the Count Basie Theater, Red Bank, New Jersey, 1992)	Bon Jovi; Sambora; Child	6:34
2.	"In These Arms" (recorded live in the Count Basie Theater, Red Bank, New Jersey, 1992)	Bon Jovi; Sambora; Bryan	5:59
3.	"Blaze of Glory" (recorded live in the Count Basie Theater, Red Bank, New Jersey, 1992)		5:44
4.	"I'll Be There for You" (recorded live in Lakeland, Florida, 1989)	Bon Jovi; Sambora	6:21
5.	"Lay Your Hands on Me" (recorded live in Giants Stadium, East Rutherford, 1989)	Bon Jovi; Sambora	5:22
6.	"Bad Medicine" (recorded live in the Miami Arena, Florida, 1993)	Bon Jovi; Sambora; Child	8:26
7.	"Bed of Roses" (acoustic; recorded live in the Miami Arena, Florida, 1993)		4:23
8.	"Never Say Goodbye" (acoustic; recorded live in the Miami Arena, Florida, 1993)	Bon Jovi; Sambora	5:30

1998 Japan special edition bonus CD PHCR-90019/20
No.	Title	Writer(s)	Length
1.	"Keep the Faith" (Count Basie Theatre, 1992)	Bon Jovi; Sambora; Child
2.	"In These Arms" (Count Basie Theatre, 1992)	Bon Jovi; Sambora; Bryan
3.	"I Believe" (Count Basie Theatre, 1992)
4.	"I'll Sleep When I'm Dead" (Milton Keynes, 1993)	Bon Jovi; Sambora; Child
5.	"I'll Sleep When I'm Dead" (Wembley, 1995)	Bon Jovi; Sambora; Child
6.	"Bed of Roses" (acoustic version)
7.	"Cama De Rosas" ("Bed of Roses" Spanish version)
8.	"Save a Prayer" (bonus track for Japan)
9.	"Starting All Over Again" (bonus track for Japan)

2010 special edition bonus tracks
No.	Title	Writer(s)	Length
13.	"Keep the Faith" (live)	Bon Jovi; Sambora; Child	7:56
14.	"I'll Sleep When I'm Dead" (live)	Bon Jovi; Sambora; Child	5:20
Total length:			78:20

Some Latin American releases feature "Cama de Rosas" (Spanish version of "Bed of Roses") as bonus track.

Some releases misspell "Dry County" as "Dry Country". Other releases misspell "Blame It on the Love of Rock & Roll" as "Blame in on ohe Love of Rock & Roll".

A 1998 edition contains an enhanced CD-ROM video of "Keep the Faith" (Live).

== Personnel ==
Bon Jovi

- Jon Bon Jovi – lead vocals, additional guitars
- Richie Sambora – lead guitar, backing vocals
- David Bryan – keyboards, backing vocals
- Alec John Such – bass, backing vocals
- Tico Torres – drums, percussion

Additional musicians

- Maxine Waters, Oren Waters, Julia Waters, Isabella Lento, Carmela Lento, Myna Matthews – additional background vocals ("In These Arms", "Dry County")
- Hugh McDonald – bass (uncredited)

Production

- Bob Rock – producer
- Obie O'Brien, Gary Platt, Randy Staub – engineering
- Brian Dobbs, Greg Goldman, Darren Grahn, Ed Korengo, Jim Lavinski, Ulrich Wild – assistant engineers
- Bob Rock, Randy Staub – mixing
- George Marino – mastering

== Charts ==
=== Weekly charts ===
Chart (1992–1995)	Peak position
Australian Albums (ARIA)	1
Austrian Albums (Ö3 Austria)	2
Canada Top Albums/CDs (RPM)	9
Dutch Albums (Album Top 100)	3
Finnish Albums (Suomen virallinen lista)	1
French Albums (SNEP)	21
German Albums (Offizielle Top 100)	2
Greek Albums (IFPI)	69
Hungarian Albums (MAHASZ)	3
Italian Albums (Musica e Dischi)	16
Japanese Albums (Oricon)	3
New Zealand Albums (RMNZ)	15
Norwegian Albums (VG-lista)	7
Scottish Albums (Official Charts)	56
Spanish Albums (AFYVE)	10
Swedish Albums (Sverigetopplistan)	3
Swiss Albums (Schweizer Hitparade)	3
UK Albums (Official Charts)	1
UK Rock & Metal Albums (Official Charts)	10
US Billboard 200	5

=== Year-end charts ===
Chart (1992)	Position
French Albums (SNEP)	49
German Albums (Offizielle Top 100)	96

Chart (1993)	Position
Australian Albums (ARIA)	10
Austrian Albums (Ö3 Austria)	3
Canada Top Albums/CDs (RPM)	39
Dutch Albums (Album Top 100)	9
German Albums (Offizielle Top 100)	2
Spanish Albums (AFYVE)	30
Swiss Albums (Schweizer Hitparade)	1
US Billboard 200	49

Chart (1994)	Position
Australian Albums (ARIA)	83
Dutch Albums (Album Top 100)	69
German Albums (Offizielle Top 100)	57

=== Decade-end charts ===
Chart (1990–1999)	Position
Austrian Albums (Ö3 Austria)	5

== Certifications and sales ==
Region	Certification	Certified units/sales
Argentina (CAPIF)	2× Platinum	120,000^{^}
Australia (ARIA)	3× Platinum	210,000^{^}
Austria (IFPI Austria)	2× Platinum	100,000^{*}
Belgium (BRMA)	Platinum	50,000^{*}
Brazil (Pro-Música Brasil)	Gold	100,000^{*}
Canada (Music Canada)	5× Platinum	500,000^{^}
Chile	Gold	15,000
Denmark (IFPI Danmark)	Platinum	80,000^{^}
Finland (Musiikkituottajat)	Gold	37,022
France (SNEP)	Gold	100,000^{*}
Germany (BVMI)	2× Platinum	1,000,000^{^}
Hong Kong (IFPI Hong Kong)	Gold	10,000^{*}
Indonesia	Platinum	50,000
Ireland (IRMA)	Platinum	15,000^{^}
Italy (FIMI)	Gold	50,000^{*}
Japan (RIAJ)	4× Platinum	800,000^{^}
Malaysia	Platinum	25,000
Mexico (AMPROFON)	Gold	100,000^{^}
Netherlands (NVPI)	Platinum	100,000^{^}
New Zealand (RMNZ)	Gold	7,500^{^}
Norway (IFPI Norway)	Platinum	50,000^{*}
Philippines (PARI)	4× Platinum	120,000
Portugal (AFP)	Platinum	40,000^{^}
Singapore (RIAS)	2× Platinum	30,000
South Korea (KMCA)	4× Platinum	60,000
Spain (Promusicae)	Platinum	100,000^{^}
Sweden (GLF)	Platinum	100,000^{^}
Switzerland (IFPI Switzerland)	3× Platinum	150,000^{^}
Taiwan (RIT)	Platinum	50,000
Thailand	Platinum	50,000
Turkey (Mü-Yap)	Gold	5,000^{*}
United Kingdom (BPI)	Platinum	300,000^{^}
United States (RIAA)	2× Platinum	2,000,000^{^}
Summaries
Asia	—	1,000,000
Worldwide	—	8,000,000
^{*} Sales figures based on certification alone.^{^} Shipments figures based on certification alone.
