= This Is Our House =

- iTunes cover

Single by Bon Jovi

from the album Greatest Hits
- Released: September 6, 2011 (iTunes)
- Recorded: 2009
- Genre: Rock
- Length: 4:22
- Label: Island
- Songwriters: Jon Bon Jovi, Richie Sambora, Desmond Child
- Producer: John Shanks

Bon Jovi singles chronology
"No Apologies" (2011)	"This Is Our House" (2011)	"Because We Can" (2013)

Alternative cover
- Physical single and Spotify cover

Music video
- "This Is Our House (Live)" on YouTube

"This Is Our House" is a song by the American rock band Bon Jovi. It was originally written by Jon Bon Jovi, Richie Sambora and Desmond Child and recorded in 2009. Originally intended as an exclusive track for the forthcoming National League Super Bowl season, it became a hit with Bon Jovi fans who asked for it to be including on the band's new hits collection. Greatest Hits had already been pressed to disk and it was too late to include the song of a physical format, but it made its debut proper as a bonus track if one downloaded Greatest Hits from the band's website. The song was also released as a bonus track on the iTunes edition of Greatest Hits in the UK and Europe but was released as a digital single in September 2011. Bon Jovi opened many shows in 2010-2012 with the song.

Designed as a "sports anthem", the song was used by a number of sports leagues and teams, including Australia's National Rugby League, who prominently used the song as part of its marketing campaign beginning in the 2011 season. In contrast, its use by the New Jersey Devils was deemed controversial by fans due to the traditions surrounding Gary Glitter's "Rock and Roll", which the team had discontinued to promote a more positive fan atmosphere. It has been the touchdown song for the New England Patriots since 2009.

== Background ==
"This Is Our House" was written to be a "sports anthem". Speaking of the song, Jon Bon Jovi stated, "Having led an Arena Football League team from inception to championship and as a lifelong sports fan, I know the intensity and dedication that goes into cheering on your team." Owing to its thematic, before the band performed the song during The Circle Tour at Mosaic Stadium at Taylor Field in Regina, Saskatchewan, Jon Bon Jovi suggested that the Saskatchewan Roughriders (who play their home games at Mosaic) adopt it as their theme song.

== Use in sports ==
Fitting for its purpose, "This Is Our House" saw a number of uses by sports teams and leagues. In February 2011, Australia's National Rugby League announced that "This Is Our House" would be the official theme song of the league beginning in the 2011 season, securing rights to the song for three years for use in its promotional campaigns. The song primarily appeared in television commercials, and as the theme music for Nine Network telecasts of the league. Fan reception to the campaign was positive, so much so that the NRL wanted to have Bon Jovi make a live appearance during its championship game, the NRL Grand Final. However, Kelly Clarkson was chosen to perform instead. The song was used until the 2013 NRL season, when it was replaced by a cover of "Something's Got a Hold on Me" by Jessica Mauboy. The song was also used in promotions by the New York Rangers, the New England Patriots, and the National Football League.

At their home opener for the 2013-14 season on October 5, 2013, the National Hockey League's New Jersey Devils adopted "This Is Our House" as its goal music, replacing part 2 of Gary Glitter's "Rock and Roll"—whose use by the team dated back to the team's move from Colorado in 1982. The team later stated that the change was intended to "[create] a game experience that represents what we are on the ice, makes all age groups proud of who we are, and represents our community"—a comment alluding a mocking "hey, you suck!" chant sung in tune to the song by fans. The change was met with an immediately negative response; fans booed the playing of "This Is Our House" throughout the game and reacted via social networking services.

Yahoo! Sports writer Greg Wyshynski pointed out the irony of Bon Jovi's music being booed by residents of their own state, joking that doing so "might be grounds for deportation in New Jersey. (OK, maybe just a shakedown from the feds; booing Bruce would mean deportation.)" Following a vote by fans on the team's website alongside Locksley's "The Whip" and Monster Truck's "Righteous Smoke", "This Is Our House" was ultimately replaced by The White Stripes' "Seven Nation Army".
