= Hard & Hot (Best of Bon Jovi) =

Greatest hits album by Bon Jovi
- Released: July 1991
- Recorded: 1982–1986
- Genre: Glam metal; hard rock
- Length: 63:49
- Label: Jambco; Mercury; Phonogram
- Producer: Tony Bongiovi; Lance Quinn; Bruce Fairbairn

Bon Jovi chronology
New Jersey (1988)	Hard & Hot (Best of Bon Jovi) (1991)	Keep the Faith (1992)

Hard & Hot (Best of Bon Jovi) is the first compilation album by American glam metal band Bon Jovi, released exclusively in Australia through Mercury Records and Phonogram Inc. in 1991. The album features tracks from the band's first three albums, and although it did not enter the ARIA top 100 albums chart, it peaked at number 44 on the Australian Music Report albums chart and remained in the top 100 for seven weeks. The album exposed tracks from the band's first two albums, Bon Jovi and 7800° Fahrenheit, to the Australian market for the first time as both albums failed to chart upon their original release in 1984 and 1985, respectively.

== Track listing ==
No.	Title	Writer(s)	From album	Length
1.	"Shot Through the Heart"	Jon Bon Jovi; Jack Ponti	Bon Jovi (1984)	4:21
2.	"Runaway"	Bon Jovi; George Karak	Bon Jovi	3:53
3.	"She Don't Know Me"	Mark Avsec	Bon Jovi	4:02
4.	"Breakout"	Bon Jovi; David Bryan	Bon Jovi	5:22
5.	"In and Out of Love"	Bon Jovi	7800° Fahrenheit (1985)	4:27
6.	"King of the Mountain"	Bon Jovi; Richie Sambora	7800° Fahrenheit	3:56
7.	"Tokyo Road"	Bon Jovi; Sambora	7800° Fahrenheit	5:45
8.	"Always Run to You"	Bon Jovi; Sambora	7800° Fahrenheit	5:02
9.	"To the Fire"	Bon Jovi; Sambora; Bryan	7800° Fahrenheit	4:26
10.	"You Give Love a Bad Name"	Bon Jovi; Sambora; Desmond Child	Slippery When Wet (1986)	3:48
11.	"Livin' on a Prayer"	Bon Jovi; Sambora; Child	Slippery When Wet	4:13
12.	"Wanted Dead or Alive"	Bon Jovi; Sambora	Slippery When Wet	5:11
13.	"I'd Die for You"	Bon Jovi; Sambora; Child	Slippery When Wet	4:34
14.	"Never Say Goodbye"	Bon Jovi; Sambora	Slippery When Wet	4:48
Total length:				63:49

== Personnel ==
- Jon Bon Jovi - lead vocals, acoustic guitar
- Richie Sambora - guitar, backing vocals
- David Bryan - keyboards, backing vocals
- Alec John Such - bass guitar, backing vocals
- Hugh McDonald - bass on "Runaway" and "Livin' on a Prayer" (uncredited)
- Tico Torres - drums, percussion
