= Blaze of Glory (Jon Bon Jovi album) =

Studio album by Jon Bon Jovi
- Released: August 7, 1990
- Studio: A&M (Hollywood, California)
- Genre: Hard rock
- Length: 48:43
- Label: Mercury
- Producer: Jon Bon Jovi; Danny Kortchmar; Alan Silvestri

Jon Bon Jovi chronology
| Blaze of Glory (1990) | Destination Anywhere (1997) |

Japanese limited edition cover
- UICY-6469

Singles from Blaze of Glory
- 1. "Blaze of Glory" Released: July 5, 1990; 2. "Miracle" Released: 1990; 3. "Never Say Die" Released: January 1991; 4. "Dyin' Ain't Much of a Livin'" Released: 1991

Professional ratings
Review scores
| Source | Rating |
|---|---|
| AllMusic | 2.5/5 stars |
| Entertainment Weekly | C− |
| Rolling Stone | 2/5 stars |
| The Rolling Stone Album Guide | 1.5/5 stars |

Blaze of Glory is the debut solo studio album by Jon Bon Jovi, the frontman of Bon Jovi. The album was released on August 7, 1990, through Mercury Records. It includes songs from and inspired by the movie Young Guns II. Emilio Estevez originally approached Bon Jovi to ask him for permission to include the song "Wanted Dead or Alive" on the soundtrack.

Elton John, Little Richard, and Jeff Beck contributed to the album. It was awarded a Golden Globe and received Academy Award and Grammy nominations.

== Chart performance ==
The album peaked at No. 3 on the Billboard 200 and No. 2 on the UK Albums Chart.

The title track "Blaze of Glory" was released as the first single and hit No. 1 on the Billboard Hot 100 and the Mainstream rock charts. "Miracle" was released as the second single and charted at #12 on the Billboard Hot 100 and #20 on the Mainstream rock charts and the third single "Never Say Die" charted in Australia, Canada and Poland but was not released in the US. "Dyin Ain't Much of a Livin'" featuring Elton John and "Santa Fe" were released as promo singles.

In 1998, a country duet version of "Bang a Drum" was released with country singer Chris LeDoux, the track was released as a single with a music video and reached number 68 on the US Hot Country Songs chart.

== Track listing ==
All tracks are written by Jon Bon Jovi, except where noted.

Blaze of Glory track listing
| No. | Title | Writer(s) | Length |
|---|---|---|---|
| 1. | "Billy Get Your Guns (Note: Features dialogue "I'll make ya famous" by Emilio Estevez)" | | 4:49 |
| 2. | "Miracle" | | 5:20 |
| 3. | "Blaze of Glory (Note: Features dialogue "You are not a god" by Kiefer Sutherland and Emilio Estevez)" | | 5:35 |
| 4. | "Blood Money" | | 2:34 |
| 5. | "Santa Fe" | | 5:42 |
| 6. | "Justice in the Barrel" | | 6:48 |
| 7. | "Never Say Die" | | 4:54 |
| 8. | "You Really Got Me Now" | | 2:24 |
| 9. | "Bang a Drum" | | 4:44 |
| 10. | "Dyin' Ain't Much of a Livin' (Note: Features dialogue "Straight to hell" by Kiefer Sutherland)" | | 4:40 |
| 11. | "Guano City" (instrumental) | Alan Silvestri | 1:16 |

== Personnel ==
Musicians (adapted from CD liner notes). Credits also from other sources.

- Jon Bon Jovi – vocals, acoustic guitar (2, 6–8), acoustic piano (3), electric guitar (3, 5), 12-string acoustic guitar (3, 9), harmonica (4), guitar solo (5), guitars (10)
- Elton John – acoustic piano (1, 10), backing vocals (10)
- Benmont Tench – organ (1–3, 5–7, 9, 10), acoustic piano (5, 8)
- Phil Parlapiano – accordion (2, 4)
- Little Richard – acoustic piano (8), vocals (8)
- Aldo Nova – guitars (1, 2, 6, 7), keyboards (2, 3, 6, 9, 10), acoustic guitar (3–5, 9, 10), electric guitar (3), string arrangements (5), acoustic guitar intro (6), tambourine (8)
- Danny Kortchmar – guitars (1, 2, 6, 7, 9), acoustic guitar (4, 5, 8)
- Jeff Beck – guitar solo (1–3, 6, 7, 9), lead guitar intro (6), guitars (10)
- Robbin Crosby – acoustic guitar (7)
- Waddy Wachtel – slide guitar (8), guitars (9)
- Randy Jackson – bass (1–3, 6–9)
- Bob Glaub – bass (5, 10)
- Kenny Aronoff – drums (1–3, 5–10), percussion (3, 4, 6)
- The "Runners" – handclaps (1)
- Alan Silvestri – string arrangements (5), composer and conductor (11)
- Myrna Matthews – backing vocals (2, 6, 9, 10)
- Julia Waters – backing vocals (2, 6, 9, 10), vocal intro (6)
- Maxine Waters – backing vocals (2, 6, 9, 10)
- Lou Diamond Phillips – vocal intro (6)

Production

- Jon Bon Jovi – producer (1–10)
- Danny Kortchmar – producer (1–10)
- Alan Silvestri – producer (11)
- Rob Jacobs – recording, mixing
- Brian Scheuble – recording, mixing
- John "Obie" O'Brien – additional recording
- Greg Goldman – assistant engineer
- Chad Munsey – assistant engineer
- Rick Plank – assistant engineer
- Dave Collins – mastering
- Jon "J.D." Dworkow – production coordinator
- Margery Greenspan – design
- Timothy White – back cover photography
- Mark Weiss – inner sleeve photography

== Charts ==
=== Weekly charts ===
Weekly chart performance for Blaze of Glory
| Chart (1990) | Peak position |
|---|---|
| Australian Albums (ARIA) | 2 |
| Austrian Albums (Ö3 Austria) | 1 |
| Dutch Albums (Album Top 100) | 20 |
| German Albums (Offizielle Top 100) | 4 |
| Hungarian Albums (MAHASZ) | 9 |
| New Zealand Albums (RMNZ) | 3 |
| Norwegian Albums (VG-lista) | 4 |
| Spanish Albums (AFYVE) | 15 |
| Swedish Albums (Sverigetopplistan) | 1 |
| Swiss Albums (Schweizer Hitparade) | 4 |
| UK Albums (OCC) | 2 |
| US Billboard 200 | 3 |

=== Year-end charts ===
Year-end chart performance for Blaze of Glory
| Chart (1990) | Position |
|---|---|
| German Albums (Offizielle Top 100) | 93 |
| US Billboard 200 | 65 |
| Chart (1991) | Position |
| US Billboard 200 | 92 |

== Certifications ==
Certifications for Blaze of Glory
| Region | Certification | Certified units/sales |
|---|---|---|
| Australia (ARIA) | Platinum | 70,000^{^} |
| Austria (IFPI Austria) | Platinum | 50,000^{*} |
| Canada (Music Canada) | 2× Platinum | 200,000^{^} |
| Japan (RIAJ) | Gold | 100,000^{^} |
| New Zealand (RMNZ) | Platinum | 15,000^{^} |
| Spain (Promusicae) | Gold | 50,000^{^} |
| Switzerland (IFPI Switzerland) | Platinum | 50,000^{^} |
| United Kingdom (BPI) | Gold | 100,000^{^} |
| United States (RIAA) | 2× Platinum | 2,000,000^{^} |
^{*} Sales figures based on certification alone.^{^} Shipments figures based on certification alone.
