= Dry County (song) =

1994 single by Bon Jovi

Single by Bon Jovi

from the album Keep the Faith
- B-side: "Stranger in This Town" (live)
- Released: March 7, 1994
- Length: 9:52 (album version); 6:37 (radio edit)
- Label: Jambco; Vertigo; Mercury
- Songwriter: Jon Bon Jovi
- Producer: Bob Rock

Bon Jovi singles chronology
"I Believe" (1993)	"Dry County" (1994)	"Always" (1994)

Music video
- "Dry County" on YouTube

"Dry County" is a song by American rock band Bon Jovi. It was released on March 7, 1994, by Vertigo and Mercury Records, as the sixth and final single from their fifth studio album, Keep the Faith (1992). It was written by Jon Bon Jovi. Clocking in at 9 minutes and 52 seconds, "Dry County" is the longest song that Bon Jovi has ever recorded on a studio album. The song reached number nine on the UK Singles Chart and number six in Finland. It was not released in the United States or Canada. The CD versions were released as a limited edition Gold CD double digipack in the UK. Unfortunately many copies on compact disc have been victims of CD Rot, making it rare for collectors to find a pristine edition. In Europe, the Remixed Bob Clearmountain edited radio version was issued as a single.

== Lyrical interpretation ==
"Dry County" is about the decline of the U.S. domestic oil industry and its effect on those whose income relied on it. In live versions of the song, during the buildup to the second guitar solo, Jon Bon Jovi often includes a monologue about the struggles of life generally.

== Live performances ==
Although "Dry County" is considered a fan favorite, it was only played regularly on the Keep the Faith Tour. On May 13, 2006, Bon Jovi played "Dry County" live at the first concert of the summer leg of their Have a Nice Day Tour in Düsseldorf, it was the first time it had been played live in 10 years, and went on to be performed on further occasions on that tour and on the band's more recent Lost Highway Tour. The band's followers often display signs requesting the song. It was also performed during The Circle Tour and Because We Can Tour. It was performed once on the This House Is Not for Sale Tour in 2018 at the Allentown, Pennsylvania show.

== Track listings ==
- UK 7-inch and cassette single
1. "Dry County"
2. "Stranger in This Town" (live)
- UK CD1
1. "Dry County" (Clearmountain Mix) (Full Length Version)
2. "Stranger in This Town" (live)
3. "Blood Money" (live)
- UK CD2
1. "Dry County" (live)
2. "It's Only Rock 'n' Roll" (live)
3. "Waltzing Matilda" (live)
- European and Australian CD single
1. "Dry County" (Edit/Clearmountain Mix) – 6:37
2. "Dry County" (Clearmountain Mix) 9:53
- Japanese CD single
1. "Dry County" (edit)
2. "Stranger in This Town" (live - featuring Richie Sambora on lead vocals)
3. "Blood Money" (live)
4. "Dry County" (live)
5. "It's Only Rock 'n' Roll" (live) (duet with Richie Sambora)
6. "Waltzing Matilda" (live - featuring Tico Torres on lead vocals and Jon Bon Jovi on drums)

== Charts ==
=== Weekly charts ===
Chart (1994)	Peak position
Australia (ARIA)	31
Austria (Ö3 Austria Top 40)	26
Europe (Eurochart Hot 100)	15
Finland (Suomen virallinen lista)	6
Germany (GfK)	41
Ireland (IRMA)	18
Israel (Israeli Singles Chart)	10
Japan (Oricon)	24
Netherlands (Dutch Top 40)	22
Netherlands (Single Top 100)	19
Scottish Singles Sales (Official Charts)	14
Sweden (Sverigetopplistan)	35
Switzerland (Schweizer Hitparade)	10
UK Singles (Official Charts)	9
UK Airplay (Music Week)	23

=== Year-end charts ===
Chart (1994)	Position
UK Singles (OCC)	145

== Release history ==
Region	Date	Format(s)	Label(s)	Ref.
United Kingdom	March 7, 1994	7-inch vinyl; CD1; cassette	Jambco; Vertigo; Mercury	
Australia	March 14, 1994	CD1; cassette	Jambco; Mercury	
United Kingdom	March 21, 1994	CD2	Jambco; Vertigo; Mercury	
Japan	March 25, 1994	CD	Jambco; Mercury	
Australia	March 28, 1994	CD2	Jambco; Mercury	
