= I Believe (Bon Jovi song) =

1993 single by Bon Jovi

Single by Bon Jovi

from the album Keep the Faith
- Released: September 20, 1993
- Length: 5:52 (album version); 4:24 (Clearmoutain mix)
- Label: Mercury; Jambco
- Songwriter: Jon Bon Jovi
- Producer: Bob Rock

Bon Jovi singles chronology
"I'll Sleep When I'm Dead" (1993)	"I Believe" (1993)	"Dry County" (1994)

Music video
- "I Believe" on YouTube

"I Believe" is a song by American rock band Bon Jovi. Written by Jon Bon Jovi, it was released in September 20, 1993, by Mercury and Jambco, as the fifth single from their fifth studio album, Keep the Faith (1992). The single reached number 11 in the United Kingdom and number 40 in Australia.

== Live performances ==
"I Believe" was played extensively during the Keep the Faith Tour (1993) and the I'll Sleep When I'm Dead Tour (1993) and on occasion on the Crush Tour (2000). Since then, it has been barely played and has become one of the rarest songs to be played live. It was played once in Germany during the 2003 Bounce Tour, once in London during the 2008 Lost Highway Tour, and most recently, once in Sydney, Australia during the 2010 Circle Tour.

== Track listing ==
- UK release
1. "I Believe" (Clearmountain mix)
2. "Runaway" (live)
3. "Livin' on a Prayer" (live)
4. "Wanted Dead or Alive" (live)

Tracks 2, 3, and 4 were recorded live on the New Jersey and Keep the Faith Tours. The dates or locations of the shows are not available due to their absence from the liner notes.

== Charts ==
Chart (1993)	Peak position
Australia (ARIA)	40
Canada Retail Singles (The Record)	10
Europe (Eurochart Hot 100)	41
Germany (GfK)	49
Ireland (IRMA)	25
Netherlands (Dutch Top 40)	28
Netherlands (Single Top 100)	32
Switzerland (Schweizer Hitparade)	34
UK Singles (OCC)	11
UK Airplay (Music Week)	30

== Release history ==
Region	Date	Format(s)	Label(s)	Ref.
United Kingdom	September 20, 1993	7-inch vinyl; cassette	Mercury; Jambco	
Australia	November 15, 1993	CD; cassette	Mercury; Jambco	
Japan	December 20, 1993	CD	Mercury; Jambco	
