= I'll Sleep When I'm Dead (Bon Jovi song) =

1993 single by Bon Jovi

Single by Bon Jovi

from the album Keep the Faith
- Released: July 26, 1993
- Genre: Glam metal
- Length: 4:43 (album version); 4:09 (edit)
- Label: Mercury; Jambco
- Songwriters: Jon Bon Jovi; Richie Sambora; Desmond Child
- Producer: Bob Rock

Bon Jovi singles chronology
"In These Arms" (1993)	"I'll Sleep When I'm Dead" (1993)	"I Believe" (1993)

Music video
- I'll Sleep When I'm Dead at YouTube

"I'll Sleep When I'm Dead" is a song by American rock band Bon Jovi. It was released on July 26, 1993, by Mercury and Jambco, as the fourth single from their fifth studio album, Keep the Faith (1992). The song was written by Jon Bon Jovi, Richie Sambora, and Desmond Child. "I'll Sleep When I'm Dead" reached No. 17 on the UK Singles Chart, No. 97 on the US Billboard Hot 100, and No. 29 on the Billboard Album Rock Tracks charts. The grave of the Doors' lead singer Jim Morrison was featured in the song's music video.

== Live performances ==
The driving drumbeat and catchy chorus of "I'll Sleep When I'm Dead" have made it a crowd favourite during live performances. It had the distinction of being one of the few Bon Jovi songs to be played at virtually every live concert since its introduction, until The Circle Tour in 2010, where it was only played occasionally. When played, it is often incorporated into a medley with a cover song inserted into the middle, such as "Jumpin' Jack Flash" by the Rolling Stones, or "Papa Was a Rollin' Stone" by the Undisputed Truth.

Concert footage of "I'll Sleep When I'm Dead" can be viewed on the Live From London and The Crush Tour DVDs.

== Track listings ==
- US CD
1. "I'll Sleep When I'm Dead" 4:44
2. "I'll Sleep When I'm Dead (Live)"
- UK CD
1. "I'll Sleep When I'm Dead" 4:44
2. "Blaze of Glory (Live)" 5:50 Recorded live at the Count Basie Theatre, Red Bank, New Jersey—December 1992
3. "Wild in the Streets (Live)" 4:58 Recorded live at Tampa Sundome, Florida—March 1993
- UK cassette single
1. "I'll Sleep When I'm Dead" 4:44
2. "Never Say Goodbye (Live Acoustic Version)" 5:30 Recorded live at the Miami Arena, Florida—March 1993

== Personnel ==
- Jon Bon Jovi – lead vocals
- Richie Sambora – guitars
- Alec John Such – bass guitar
- Tico Torres – drums
- David Bryan – keyboards
- Bob Rock – producer ("I'll Sleep When I'm Dead")
- Obie O'Brien – producer/engineer ("Blaze of Glory (Live)", "Wild In The Streets (Live)", "Never Say Goodbye (Live Acoustic Version)"), mix ("Wild In The Streets (Live)", "Never Say Goodbye (Live Acoustic Version)")
- Nicoloa – mix ("Wild In The Streets (Live)")
- Margery Greenspan – art direction
- Patricia Lie – design
- Frank Ockenfels – photography

== Charts ==
Chart (1993)	Peak position
Australia (ARIA)	24
Austria (Ö3 Austria Top 40)	19
Belgium (Ultratop 50 Flanders)	40
Europe (Eurochart Hot 100)	37
Europe (European Hit Radio)	33
Finland (Suomen virallinen lista)	20
Ireland (IRMA)	14
Netherlands (Dutch Top 40)	15
Netherlands (Single Top 100)	17
Portugal (AFP)	6
Switzerland (Schweizer Hitparade)	35
UK Singles (OCC)	17
UK Airplay (Music Week)	8
US Billboard Hot 100	97
US Mainstream Rock (Billboard)	29

== Certifications ==
Region	Certification	Certified units/sales
Australia (ARIA)	Gold	35,000^{‡}
^{‡} Sales+streaming figures based on certification alone.

== Release history ==
Region	Date	Format(s)	Label(s)	Ref.
United Kingdom	July 26, 1993	7-inch vinyl; CD; cassette	Mercury; Jambco	
Japan	September 5, 1993	Mini-CD	Mercury; Jambco	
