= Bed of Roses (Bon Jovi song) =

1993 single by Bon Jovi

Single by Bon Jovi

from the album Keep the Faith
- B-side: "Lay Your Hands on Me" (live)
- Released: January 11, 1993
- Length: 6:33 (album version); 5:05 (edit)
- Label: Mercury; Jambco
- Songwriter: Jon Bon Jovi
- Producer: Bob Rock

Bon Jovi singles chronology
"Keep the Faith" (1992)	"Bed of Roses" (1993)	"In These Arms" (1993)

Music video
- Bed of Roses at YouTube.com

"Bed of Roses" is a song by American rock band Bon Jovi from their fifth studio album, Keep the Faith (1992). It was released as the album's second single on January 11, 1993, by Mercury Records and Jambco. Jon Bon Jovi wrote the song in a hotel room while suffering from a hangover and the lyrics reflect his feelings at the time. The song contains drawn out guitar riffs and soft piano playing, along with emotive and high vocals by Jon Bon Jovi.

The song's power ballad style made it a worldwide hit, and it demonstrated the band's new, more mature sound after their success as a glam metal band in the 1980s. The single reached No.10 on the US Billboard Hot 100, No.2 on the Canadian RPM 100 Hit Tracks chart, No.13 on the UK Singles Chart, and No.10 on the German Singles Chart.

== Music video ==
The music video for "Bed of Roses" begins with shots of Richie Sambora playing guitar high in the mountain tops, and then cuts to scenes of Jon alone in his hotel room, the band recording the song in the studio, and finally performing live on stage. Initially, the video directors wanted Jon Bon Jovi to be on the mountain tops, but Jon said: "I was on top of a mountain in 'Blaze of Glory', send them" (Richie Sambora and David Bryan, who is seen playing the piano at the mountain top).

The live portions were filmed at Stabler Arena in Bethlehem, Pennsylvania, on December 31, 1992, as part of a special 1992's New Year's Eve concert. In order to get the liveliest and largest crowd there for the video, the band made arrangements to have no floor seating, and to have one price, general admission tickets.

== Track listings ==
- US 7-inch and cassette single

A. "Bed of Roses" – 6:34
B. "Lay Your Hands on Me" (live version) – 5:30

- UK 7-inch and cassette single
1. "Bed of Roses"
2. "Starting All Over Again"
- UK 12-inch single

A1. "Bed of Roses" – 6:34
B1. "Starting All Over Again" – 3:45
B2. "Lay Your Hands on Me" (live) – 5:30

- UK, Australian, and Japanese maxi-CD single
- Australian cassette single
1. "Bed of Roses" – 6:34
2. "Lay Your Hands on Me" (live) – 5:30
3. "Tokyo Road" (live) – 5:59
4. "I'll Be There for You" (live) – 6:30
- Japanese mini-CD single
1. "Bed of Roses" (edit)
2. "Lay Your Hands on Me" (live)

== Charts ==
=== Weekly charts ===
Chart (1993–1994)	Peak position
Australia (ARIA)	10
Belgium (Ultratop 50 Flanders)	23
Canada Retail Singles (The Record)	3
Canada Top Singles (RPM)	2
Ecuador (UPI)	8
Europe (Eurochart Hot 100)	31
Europe (European Hit Radio)	12
France (SNEP)	49
Germany (GfK)	10
Iceland (Íslenski Listinn Topp 40)	4
Ireland (IRMA)	15
Netherlands (Dutch Top 40)	14
Netherlands (Single Top 100)	9
New Zealand (Recorded Music NZ)	13
Portugal (AFP)	10
Sweden (Sverigetopplistan)	27
Switzerland (Schweizer Hitparade)	9
UK Singles (Official Charts)	13
UK Airplay (Music Week)	14
US Billboard Hot 100	10
US Adult Contemporary (Billboard)	39
US Pop Airplay (Billboard)	5
US Cash Box Top 100	4

=== Year-end charts ===
Chart (1993)	Position
Australia (ARIA)	47
Canada Top Singles (RPM)	18
Europe (Eurochart Hot 100)	65
Germany (Media Control)	30
Iceland (Íslenski Listinn Topp 40)	23
Netherlands (Dutch Top 40)	54
Netherlands (Single Top 100)	53
Switzerland (Schweizer Hitparade)	18
US Billboard Hot 100	57
US Cash Box Top 100	35

== Certifications ==
Region	Certification	Certified units/sales
Australia (ARIA)	3× Platinum	210,000^{‡}
Brazil (Pro-Música Brasil)	Platinum	60,000^{‡}
Denmark (IFPI Danmark)	Gold	45,000^{‡}
Germany (BVMI)	Gold	250,000^{‡}
New Zealand (RMNZ)	Platinum	30,000^{‡}
Spain (Promusicae)	Gold	30,000^{‡}
United Kingdom (BPI)	Gold	400,000^{‡}
^{‡} Sales+streaming figures based on certification alone.

== Release history ==
Region	Date	Format(s)	Label(s)	Ref.
United Kingdom	January 11, 1993	7-inch vinyl; 12-inch vinyl	Mercury; Jambco	
Japan	January 23, 1993	Mini-CD	Mercury; Jambco	
Japan	February 25, 1993	Maxi-CD	Mercury; Jambco	

== Legacy ==
"Bed of Roses" became a staple on Bon Jovi setlists for years to come, and was featured on the band's Cross Road greatest hits album, and in acoustic style on This Left Feels Right. A live performance can be viewed on the Crush Tour DVD. A version with lyrics in Spanish was also recorded, entitled "Cama De Rosas".

The song was briefly featured in an episode of Ms. Marvel, covered by a band called "Brown Jovi".
