= Young Guns II =

1990 film by Geoff Murphy

- Theatrical release poster
- Directed by: Geoff Murphy
- Written by: John Fusco
- Produced by: James G. Robinson; Paul Schiff; Irby Smith
- Starring: Emilio Estevez; Kiefer Sutherland; Lou Diamond Phillips; Christian Slater; William Petersen; Alan Ruck; Balthazar Getty
- Cinematography: Dean Semler
- Edited by: Bruce Green
- Music by: Alan Silvestri; Jon Bon Jovi
- Production company: Morgan Creek Productions
- Distributed by: 20th Century Fox
- Release date: August 1, 1990
- Running time: 104 minutes
- Country: United States
- Language: English
- Box office: $59 million

Young Guns II is a 1990 American Western action film and a sequel to Young Guns (1988). It stars Emilio Estevez, Kiefer Sutherland, Lou Diamond Phillips, and Christian Slater, and features William Petersen as Pat Garrett. It was written by John Fusco and directed by Geoff Murphy.

It follows the life of Billy the Kid, played by Emilio Estevez, in the years following the Lincoln County War in which Billy was part of The Regulators, a group of around six highly skilled gunmen avenging the death of John Tunstall – and the years leading up to Billy's documented death. The film is told by Brushy Bill Roberts, a man who in 1950 appeared claiming to be the real Billy the Kid.

While the film takes some creative license, it does show some of the main events leading up to Billy's documented death, including his talks with Governor Lew Wallace, his capture by friend-turned-foe Sheriff Pat Garrett, his trial and his subsequent escape in which he killed two deputies.

A sequel, Young Guns III: Dead or Alive, is currently in development.

== Plot ==
In 1950, attorney Charles Phalen heads to the White Sands and is contacted by elderly "Brushy Bill" Roberts, who seeks a pardon he was promised 70 years earlier by the governor of the New Mexico Territory. Dismissing Bill's claim that he is really William H. Bonney aka "Billy The Kid", widely believed to have been killed in 1881, Phalen asks if Bill has any proof.

Bill's story begins in 1879, as the famed outlaw has formed a new gang with "Arkansas" Dave Rudabaugh and Pat Garrett. In the wake of the Lincoln County War, New Mexico Governor Lew Wallace has issued warrants for the arrest of everyone involved. Billy's former compatriot Doc Scurlock, now a schoolteacher in New York, is captured and imprisoned alongside fellow Regulator Jose Chavez y Chavez and their old enemies.

Now the most wanted man in New Mexico, Billy meets with Governor Wallace, who agrees to pardon him if he testifies against the Dolan-Murphy faction. Instead, Billy discovers he has been tricked into being arrested with no chance of testifying. He escapes, returning with Dave and Garrett and posing as a lynch mob to free Doc and Chavez, who reluctantly join them on the "Mexican Blackbird" trail to Mexico. Desperate for reinforcements, the gang accepts farmer Hendry William French and teenage Yankee Tom O'Folliard, while Garrett decides to stay behind to open a boarding house.

Billy demands a $500 debt from former ally John Chisum, leaving two of the cattle baron's men dead. Furious, Chisum joins Wallace and they offer Garrett the job of Lincoln County sheriff and $1000 to hunt Bonney down. Forming a posse, Garrett recruits a journalist to document their pursuit. Billy leaves a taunting message for Garrett, and Rudabaugh tries to dig up an Apache burial ground, resulting in a knife fight with the Mexican-Indian Chavez.

Billy and the gang reach the town of White Oaks, spending the night at a bordello run by his former companion Jane Greathouse. A lynch mob gathers, and Deputy Carlyle offers to let the gang go in exchange for handing over Chavez, but Billy dresses the deputy as Chavez and instigates a shootout as he pushes Carlyle outside, where he is shot dead by the mob. The mob disperses after they've been duped into killing a lawman. Garrett tracks the gang to the bordello and burns it down, while Jane strips naked to humiliate the townsfolk and rides away.

The gang is followed closely by Garrett's posse and Tom is shot dead by Garrett, leading Billy to admit that the Mexican Blackbird was only a ruse to keep the gang together. Doc tries to leave for home, but is shot by one of Garrett's men and sacrifices himself to enable his friends to escape, though Chavez is mortally wounded and Billy is captured. Brought back to Lincoln, Billy is sentenced to death and is visited by Jane. She leaves him a pistol in the outhouse, which he uses to kill two guards and escape to Fort Sumner.

Billy finds his gang, but Dave has fled for Mexico, and a dying Chavez leaves to meet his fate alone. That night, an unarmed Billy is confronted by Garrett, and asks to be allowed to run to Mexico while Garrett tells the authorities that he killed him. Certain that Billy would not be able to resist coming back to the United States, Garrett refuses, and prepares to shoot Billy in the back. In the morning, a burial is held for Billy, but Garrett's horse is taken by an unseen figure.

Back in 1950, Brushy Bill concludes his story, convincing Phalen that he is Billy the Kid. An epilogue reveals that Dave was beheaded in Mexico as a warning to other outlaws; Garrett's book was a failure and he was shot and killed in 1908; Brushy Bill met with the governor of New Mexico, but despite corroboration from several surviving friends of the Kid, he was discredited and died less than a month later; whether or not he was Billy the Kid remains a mystery.

== Cast ==
- Emilio Estevez as
  - William H. "Billy the Kid" Bonney, the leader of the Lincoln County Regulators
  - Brushy Bill Roberts, an elderly cowboy claiming to seek a long awaited pardon
- Kiefer Sutherland as Josiah Gordon "Doc" Scurlock, Billy's right hand man in the Regulators
- Lou Diamond Phillips as Jose Chavez y Chavez, the Mexican-Indian member of the Regulators
- Christian Slater as "Arkansas" Dave Rudabaugh, a reckless and racist outlaw who joined the Regulators
- William Petersen as Pat Garrett, the newly appointed Sheriff of Lincoln County
- Alan Ruck as Hendry William French, a composite character loosely based on Henry Brown and Jim French, a farmhand recruited into the Regulators
- R. D. Call as D.A. Rynerson
- James Coburn as John Chisum, a wealthy cattle baron that owed Billy the Kid money, but chose to join the House in hunting him down
- Balthazar Getty as Tom O'Folliard, the youngest recruit in the Regulators
- Jenny Wright as Jane Greathouse, owner of the White Oaks bordello
- Jack Kehoe as Ashmun Upson, a journalist Garrett hired to document the pursuit against the Regulators
- Robert Knepper as Deputy Carlyle, a lawman who led the lynch mob in White Oaks
- Tom Kurlander as Deputy Sheriff J.W. Bell, a Lincoln county lawman who kept tabs on Billy the Kid prior to his escape
- Viggo Mortensen as John W. Poe, an enforcer for the House who rode in Garrett's posse
- Tracey Walter as Beever Smith, a tavern owner and ally to Billy the Kid
- Brad Whitford as Charles Phalen, a lawyer whom Brushy Bill reached out to
- Scott Wilson as Governor Lew Wallace, incumbent Governor of New Mexico
- Leon Rippy as Deputy Sheriff Bob Olinger, a disgruntled Lincoln County deputy who oversaw Regulator members being locked away
- Howie Young as Poe Posse
- Richard Schiff as Rat Bag
- Ginger Lynn as Dove

Jon Bon Jovi briefly appears in a nonspeaking role as a bandit who attempts escaping during the prison scene.

== Production ==
Filming took place in New Mexico and Arizona, mostly around the Santa Fe and Tucson areas respectively. Additional filming took place at Old Tucson Studios near Tucson.

Actor Lou Diamond Phillips suffered a severe injury during the filming of his final scene. Gunshots spooked the horse named Arrow that he was riding, resulting in Phillips being bucked off and dragged for 100 feet as his leg was caught in a stirrup. Phillips was emergency airlifted via helicopter to have surgery to repair his right arm which was broken in four places.

=== Development and writing ===
Screenwriter-producer John Fusco culled much of Billy's dialogue from actual newspaper interviews and reports between 1879 and 1881. Fusco appears as the "Branded Man" in the prison pit escape scene alongside Jon Bon Jovi. The cattle brand on Fusco's face reads J.C. for cattle rancher John Chisum.

John Chisum, played by James Coburn, in the film convinces Pat Garrett to accept a job as the new Lincoln County Sheriff. Coburn played Garrett in Sam Peckinpah's Pat Garrett and Billy the Kid (1973).

=== Historical accuracy ===
The historical Josiah "Doc" Scurlock lived to the age of 80 and died a respectable man in Eastland, Texas in 1929. The film's original screenplay accurately portrays Scurlock as heading to Texas with his bride. It has been reported that Kiefer Sutherland, faced with scheduling conflicts, refused to return to the Young Guns franchise unless his character died in the movie's Stinking Springs shoot-out. Writer John Fusco fought against this demand, but ultimately rewrote the scene to accommodate Sutherland's schedule.

Similarly, José Chavez y Chavez's death in the movie is an inaccurate portrayal. The real Chavez y Chavez lived to be an old man and died at the age of 72 in 1924. In both Young Guns and Young Guns II, he fights mainly with knives, but historical records show that he was as skilled a gunman as the others.

Although Tom O'Folliard was shot by Pat Garrett, he was not from Pennsylvania, and nor was he a young boy. He was played by a 14-year-old Balthazar Getty in the film, but in real life he was 20–21 years old when he died.

== Music ==
=== Soundtrack ===
Emilio Estevez originally approached Jon Bon Jovi to ask him for permission to include the song "Wanted Dead or Alive" on the soundtrack. Bon Jovi didn't feel the song's lyrics were appropriate; however, he was inspired by the project and resolved to write a new song for the film that would be more in keeping with the period and setting. He quickly wrote the song "Blaze of Glory", and performed it on acoustic guitar in the Utah desert for Estevez and John Fusco.

"Blaze of Glory" went on to reach No. 1 on the Billboard Hot 100. Jon Bon Jovi named his debut solo album Blaze of Glory, released as Young Guns II: Blaze Of Glory in the UK, which included the eponymous single as well as other songs from and inspired by the film.

The album peaked at No. 3 on the Billboard 200 and No. 2 on the UK Albums Chart.

Jon Bon Jovi made a cameo appearance in the film, as one of the prisoners in the pit with Doc and Chavez (he can be seen 28 minutes and 8 seconds into the movie).

=== Score ===
The film's original score was composed and conducted by Alan Silvestri, who provided string arrangements for the song "Santa Fe" and has one brief track on Blaze Of Glory. In September 2011 Intrada Records issued Silvestri's score on its own CD.

1. Scars (5:10)
2. Small Hands (3:04)
3. Lynch Mob (4:11)
4. Finish the Game (2:50)
5. Yoo Hoo (2:43)
6. Devil's Deal (1:26)
7. More Than Hello (2:34)
8. Tom Sees the Light (1:30)
9. Coy Dog (2:38)
10. Ride to Guano City (1:09) ("Guano City" on Blaze of Glory)
11. Battle (2:46)
12. Little Tom Dies (6:49)
13. Garrett's Place (1:10)
14. Chavez's Wound (3:01)
15. You Gonna Shoot? (3:33)
16. Stolen Horse (Finale) (1:18)

In July 2018, Rusted Wave released a limited edition of 1000 double LP vinyl pressing of Alan Silvertri's score cut at 45 RPM.

== Reception ==
=== Box office ===
Young Guns II opened on August 1, 1990, in the United States in 1,770 theaters, accumulating $8,017,438 over its opening weekend. It finished third for the weekend, behind Ghost (in its fourth week), and Presumed Innocent (in its second week). The film grossed $44,143,410 in the United States and Canada. Internationally it grossed $15 million for a worldwide total of $59 million. The film was also successful on video rental.

=== Critical response ===
Young Guns II received mostly negative reviews. On review aggregator Rotten Tomatoes, the film has received a 31% approval rating by critics based on 26 reviews. Metacritic gave the film a score of 47 out of 100, based on 18 critics, indicating "mixed or average reviews". Audiences polled by CinemaScore gave the film an average grade of "A-" on an A+ to F scale.

The Los Angeles Times said: “Full of sound, gunfire, fury and scorchingly beautiful landscapes, Young Guns II generates more sheer visual excitement than any Western since Peckinpah and Leone were in their last '70s prime." Roger Ebert, who gave Young Guns II two stars out of four, stated that "the screenplay feels unfinished, the direction is ambling, but the performances are interesting." Chris Hicks from Deseret News gave the film two out of four stars, stating that Young Guns II was "sumptuously shot, very well-acted and full of potential."

=== Accolades ===
Award	Category	Nominee(s)	Result	Ref.
Academy Awards	Best Original Song	"Blaze of Glory"; Music and Lyrics by Jon Bon Jovi	Nominated	
ASCAP Film and Television Music Awards	Most Performed Songs from Motion Pictures	"Blaze of Glory"; Music and Lyrics by Jon Bon Jovi	Won	
Golden Globe Awards	Best Original Song	"Blaze of Glory"; Music and Lyrics by Jon Bon Jovi	Won	
Grammy Awards	Best Song Written Specifically for a Motion Picture or Television	"Blaze of Glory"; Music and Lyrics by Jon Bon Jovi	Nominated	
MTV Video Music Awards	Best Video from a Film	Jon Bon Jovi – "Blaze of Glory"	Nominated	
Young Artist Awards	Best Young Actor Supporting Role in a Motion Picture	Balthazar Getty	Nominated	

== Sequel ==
Soon after the release of Young Guns II, there were rumors of a possible Young Guns III in the early 1990s, which would have potentially resolved the Billy the Kid/Brushy Bill theories, with Estevez reprising his role. Though at that time, nothing ever came of it and a third Young Guns film never materialized. However, in January 2021, plans of a sequel were teased by screenwriter John Fusco who shared a mock poster for a film titled Young Guns III: Alias Billy the Kid, likely as a way to continue the story of Billy the Kid. In March, Estevez told Collider people were interested in seeing him play the character again and that a third film is "definitely in the works."

In September 2021, more information came out about the sequel, including that Lou Diamond Phillips and Christian Slater would return to the franchise. In 2023, Phillips gave an update that the project was being affected by rights issues, though Estevez believed that the film could still happen in the future.

In March 2025, Estevez announced that the film, tentatively titled Young Guns III: Dead or Alive, will begin production in New Mexico in the fall with him producing and directing and Fusco writing and co-producing. It is unknown if the film will be released theatrically or exclusively on a streaming service.
