= In These Arms =

1993 single by Bon Jovi

Single by Bon Jovi

from the album Keep the Faith
- Released: May 3, 1993
- Genre: Rock
- Length: 5:19 (album version); 4:29 (radio edit)
- Label: Mercury; Jambco
- Songwriters: Jon Bon Jovi; Richie Sambora; David Bryan
- Producer: Bob Rock

Bon Jovi singles chronology
"Bed of Roses" (1993)	"In These Arms" (1993)	"I'll Sleep When I'm Dead" (1993)

Music video
- In These Arms at YouTube.com

"In These Arms" is a song by American rock band Bon Jovi, released on May 3, 1993, by Mercury and Jambco, as the third single from the band's fifth studio album, Keep the Faith (1992). The song was written by band members Jon Bon Jovi, Richie Sambora and David Bryan, and produced by Bob Rock.

== Composition ==
The song's lyrics are about everlasting love and devotion. The song is characterized by a strong bass rhythm, jangling guitars, and very tight, hard drum playing, as well as soulful, emotional singing by Jon Bon Jovi. However, it is not a ballad, as its driving guitars and fast-paced beat and upbeat sound maintain it as more of a pop-rock song, in the vein of "Born to Be My Baby".

== Chart performance ==
"In These Arms" was Bon Jovi's second-most successful single from Keep the Faith in the United States, reaching number 27 on the Billboard Hot 100, number 32 on the Billboard Album Rock Tracks chart, and number 14 on the Billboard Top 40/Mainstream chart. It also reached number five in Iceland, number six in Canada, number seven in the Netherlands, number nine in the United Kingdom, and number 10 in Australia and Portugal.

== Music video ==
The accompanying music video for the song shows Bon Jovi performing at a concert on their Keep the Faith Tour. The live portions were filmed during Bon Jovi's New Year's Eve show at Stabler Arena in Bethlehem, Pennsylvania on December 31, 1992. The live show was also featured on their previous track "Bed of Roses". Portions of the video were also filmed at the Dane County Coliseum in Madison, Wisconsin in March 1993.

== Legacy ==
The song has always been a fan favorite, and was a staple in the band's setlist on their Have a Nice Day Tour, and also was played frequently on the Lost Highway Tour, especially on the European leg of the tour. The song was also recorded by the band's keyboard player David Bryan on his first solo album On a Full Moon released in 1995, as an instrumental piano version, and also appears on his second solo album Lunar Eclipse released in 2000, but this time with vocals from Bryan.

== Track listing ==
- UK release
1. "In These Arms"
2. "Keep the Faith" (live)
3. "In These Arms" (live)

== Charts ==
=== Weekly charts ===
Chart (1993)	Peak position
Australia (ARIA)	10
Austria (Ö3 Austria Top 40)	20
Belgium (Ultratop 50 Flanders)	22
Canada Retail Singles (The Record)	10
Canada Top Singles (RPM)	6
Europe (Eurochart Hot 100)	25
Europe (European Hit Radio)	24
Germany (GfK)	14
Iceland (Íslenski Listinn Topp 40)	5
Lithuania (M-1)	1
Netherlands (Dutch Top 40)	8
Netherlands (Single Top 100)	7
Portugal (AFP)	10
Switzerland (Schweizer Hitparade)	23
UK Singles (Official Charts)	9
UK Airplay (Music Week)	13
US Billboard Hot 100	27
US Mainstream Rock Airplay (Billboard)	32
US Pop Airplay (Billboard)	14
US Cash Box Top 100	24

=== Year-end charts ===
Chart (1993)	Position
Australia (ARIA)	67
Canada Top Singles (RPM)	58
Germany (Media Control)	71
Iceland (Íslenski Listinn Topp 40)	79
Netherlands (Dutch Top 40)	81
Netherlands (Single Top 100)	87

== Certifications ==
Region	Certification	Certified units/sales
Australia (ARIA)	Platinum	70,000^{‡}
United Kingdom (BPI)	Silver	200,000^{‡}
^{‡} Sales+streaming figures based on certification alone.

== Release history ==
Region	Date	Format(s)	Label(s)	Ref.
United Kingdom	May 3, 1993	CD; cassette	Mercury; Jambco	
Japan	May 26, 1993	Mini-CD	Mercury; Jambco	
Australia	June 14, 1993	CD; cassette	Mercury; Jambco	
