= David Bryan =

American keyboardist and songwriter

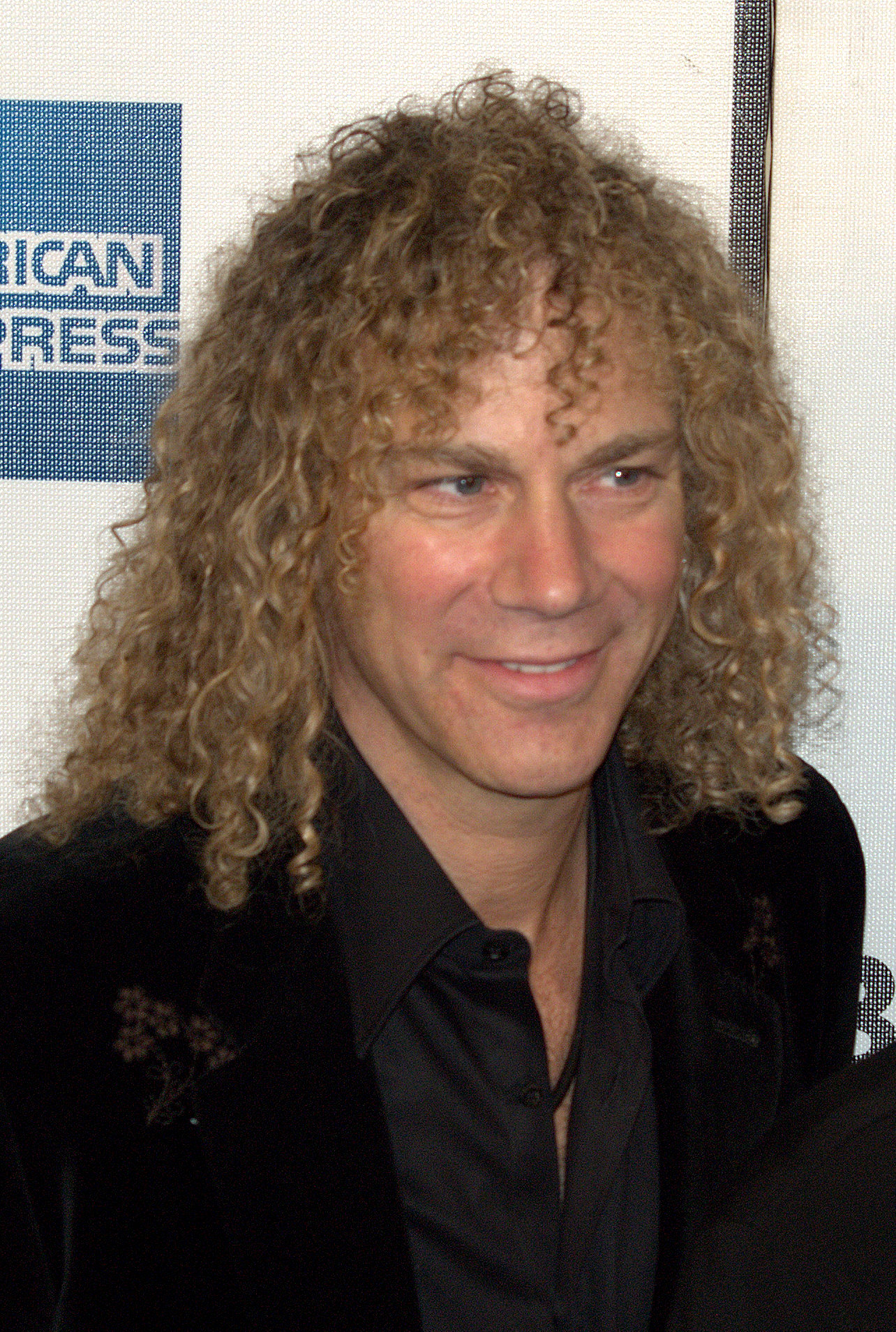
- Bryan at the 2009 premiere of When We Were Beautiful

Background information
- Born: David Bryan Rashbaum; February 7, 1962 (age 64); Perth Amboy, New Jersey, U.S.
- Genres: Hard rock; arena rock; pop rock; glam metal
- Occupations: Musician; songwriter; singer
- Instruments: Keyboards; vocals
- Years active: 1978–present
- Member of: Bon Jovi

David Bryan Rashbaum (born February 7, 1962) is an American musician and songwriter, best known as the keyboardist and one of the founding members of the rock band Bon Jovi, in which he also co-wrote songs and performs backing vocals. In 2018, he was inducted into the Rock and Roll Hall of Fame as a member of Bon Jovi. He is also known for writing the music and co-writing the lyrics with Joe DiPietro for the musical Memphis, for which he won the Tony Award for Best Original Score.

== Early life ==
David Bryan Rashbaum was born on February 7, 1962, in Perth Amboy, New Jersey and raised in Edison, New Jersey. His father, Eddie Rashbaum, played the trumpet. Bryan was raised Jewish. He attended elementary school at Clara Barton, where he played many instruments including violin, viola, trumpet and clarinet. He also attended Herbert Hoover Middle School, then J. P. Stevens High School, from which he graduated. Bryan began to learn piano at age seven and played keyboards for a band called Transition with bass player Steve Sileo and lead singer Mike Ziegel. He studied with Emery Hack, a professor at Juilliard, for thirteen years. Bryan briefly attended Rutgers University, but dropped out to attend Juilliard.

== Career ==
=== With Bon Jovi ===
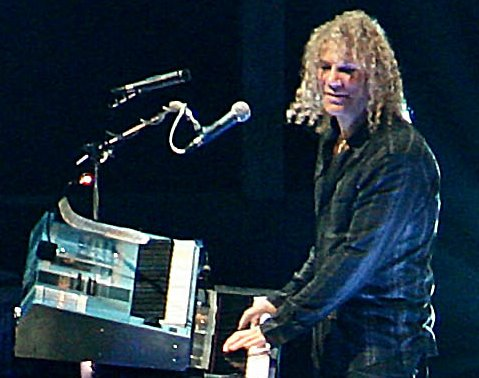
Bryan at a concert with Bon Jovi

Bryan was the first Bon Jovi member to receive a call when Jon Bon Jovi learned that he had received a recording contract, and agreed to join the band. He chose his stage name when he grew tired of continually having to spell out his entire name. At the time, Bryan was attending Rutgers University and was studying Pre-Med with a 4.0 GPA. Bryan has played keyboards and sung on all of Bon Jovi's albums, as well as some of the solo albums of Jon Bon Jovi and Richie Sambora. Bryan has co-written the songs "Love Lies" and "Breakout" on Bon Jovi's self-titled first album; "Only Lonely," "The Hardest Part Is the Night," and "To the Fire" on 7800° Fahrenheit; the hit "In These Arms" on Keep the Faith; and "Last Cigarette" on Have a Nice Day (including the international bonus track "Unbreakable") .

=== Musical theater ===
Bryan and Joe DiPietro wrote the music for the musical Memphis, for which the duo won the Tony Award for Best Original Score The musical had its off-Broadway debut in 2002. In 2008, Memphis was performed at the La Jolla Playhouse in San Diego. The show was also performed in January 2009 in Seattle, Washington, at the 5th Avenue Theatre, prior to moving to Broadway later in 2009. Memphis, which ran on Broadway from October 18, 2009, to August 5, 2012, was nominated for 8 Tony awards for the 2010 season and won 4 including Best Musical and Best Original Score.

Bryan also co-wrote the musical The Toxic Avenger, again collaborating with Joe DiPietro. The musical made its off-Broadway premiere at New World Stages on April 6, 2009.

He has worked on a musical with DiPietro titled Chasing the Song, which chronicles American songwriters from 1962 to 1964 who worked in the Brill Building. Bryan describes it as "a fictional story about factual America." Director Christopher Ashley and choreographer Sergio Trujillo are also involved. According to Playbill, "A fall or early winter workshop of the musical is currently being planned. Broadway is the goal."

Their musical Diana, about Princess Diana, began previews on Broadway on March 2, 2020, with an anticipated opening date of March 31, following a tryout production at the La Jolla Playhouse in San Diego, CA the previous year. The Broadway opening was delayed until December 16, 2021, due to the COVID-19 pandemic closing of all Broadway theaters. The musical was then filmed that summer with no audience at the Longacre Theater, with the film being released on Netflix on October 1, 2021.

== Personal life ==
Bryan was married to April McLean from 1990 to 2004. They have three children; twins Gabby Luna and Colton Moon Bryan born in 1994, and Artie Bryan (Tyger Lily) born in 2000. In 2010, he married his second wife Lexi Quaas (b. 1970) in Colts Neck, NJ.

== Charity work ==
Bryan is very active in VH-1's Save the Music program, as well as Only Make Believe. He also wrote the anthem for Only Make Believe, "Rockin' All Over the World", with Dena Hammerstein. He is an honorary Board member for Only Make Believe, a non-profit organization that brings interactive theater to chronically ill and disabled children in hospitals and care facilities. He is also a board member of Damon Marks' Traveling Guitar Foundation.

The band has built several homes for victims of Hurricane Katrina. The video for the hit song "Who Says You Can't Go Home" is a documentary of the making of these homes. The band also gave Oprah Winfrey's Angel Network one million dollars. With this, she created Bon Jovi Boulevard in Louisiana. Bon Jovi was welcomed back, one year later, to see Bon Jovi Boulevard, and to unveil it to its future residents.

== Discography ==
=== Solo ===
- Netherworld soundtrack (1992)
- On a Full Moon (1995)
- Lunar Eclipse (2000)

=== With Bon Jovi ===
Studio albums

- Bon Jovi (1984)
- 7800° Fahrenheit (1985)
- Slippery When Wet (1986)
- New Jersey (1988)
- Keep the Faith (1992)
- These Days (1995)
- Crush (2000)
- Bounce (2002)
- Have a Nice Day (2005)
- Lost Highway (2007)
- The Circle (2009)
- What About Now (2013)
- Burning Bridges (2015)
- This House Is Not for Sale (2016)
- 2020 (2020)
- Forever (2024)

Compilation albums

- Hard & Hot (1991)
- Cross Road (1994)
- Tokyo Road: Best of Bon Jovi (2001)
- This Left Feels Right (2003)
- Greatest Hits (2010)

Live albums

- One Wild Night Live 1985-2001 (2001)
- Inside Out (2012)
- This House Is Not for Sale – Live from the London Palladium (2016)

Box sets

- 100,000,000 Bon Jovi Fans Can't Be Wrong (2004)

=== Contributions ===
- Stranger in This Town (1991) – songwriter, keyboards, string arrangements
- Netherworld Soundtrack (1992) – original score
- Time Was – Curtis Stigers (1995) – wrote "This Time"
- Destination Anywhere (1997) – accordion, piano
- Undiscovered Soul (1998) – songwriter
- The Toxic Avenger (2009) – musical soundtrack
- Memphis: A New Musical (2009) – musical soundtrack
- Memphis: The Musical (2015) – musical soundtrack
- My Everything Is You – Brotherhood (studio album)| Matt O'Ree Band – (2016) – songwriter, performer
- My Everything Is You – Live at the Stone Pony! (live album)| Matt O'Ree Band – (2018) – songwriter, performer
- Diana: The Musical (2019) – musical soundtrack
