= Blaze of Glory (Jon Bon Jovi song) =

Single by Jon Bon Jovi

from the album Blaze of Glory
- B-side: "Blood Money"
- Released: July 5, 1990
- Genre: Hard rock; country rock
- Length: 5:35; 4:24 (edit)
- Label: Mercury
- Songwriter: Jon Bon Jovi
- Producers: Danny Kortchmar; Jon Bon Jovi

Jon Bon Jovi singles chronology
"Blaze of Glory" (1990)	"Miracle" (1990)

Music video
- "Blaze of Glory" on YouTube

"Blaze of Glory" is the debut solo single of American singer-songwriter Jon Bon Jovi. It was released in July 1990 by Mercury Records as the lead single from his first solo album, Blaze of Glory (1990). The song was written by Bon Jovi and co-produced by him with Danny Kortchmar. It reached No. 1 on the US Billboard Hot 100 and Album Rock Tracks charts in 1990, becoming his only chart-topper away from his band Bon Jovi. "Blaze of Glory" also topped the Australian, Canadian, and New Zealand singles charts and reached No. 13 on the UK Singles Chart.

== Background ==
The power ballad was allegedly recorded by Jon Bon Jovi because Emilio Estevez requested Bon Jovi's song "Wanted Dead or Alive" for the soundtrack to Young Guns II, but Jon did not think the lyrics—about the band constantly touring—fit the theme of the Western movie. However, the request inspired him to write "Blaze of Glory" with lyrics more topical to the film.

In 1990, guitarist Aldo Nova wrote the main guitar riff used in "Blaze of Glory". In 1991, to return the favor, Jon Bon Jovi worked with Nova to release Blood on the Bricks on Bon Jovi's label Jambco Records.

The song features a music video and remains a crowd favorite with Bon Jovi fans, despite the fact that the song was not released as one of the band's singles, and only by Jon. The song was included on both Bon Jovi greatest hits compilations: 1994's Cross Road and 2008's Greatest Hits. The track is notable for the performance of Jeff Beck on guitar. The music video was filmed at The Rectory near Moab, Utah.

== Awards ==
Year	Nominee / work	Award	Result
1991	Academy Awards	Best Original Song	Nominated
1991	American Music Awards	Favorite Pop/Rock Song	Won
1991	Golden Globe Awards	Best Original Song	Won
1991	Grammy Awards	Best Male Rock Vocal Performance	Nominated
1991	Grammy Awards	Best Song Written for Visual Media	Nominated
1991	MTV Video Music Awards	Best Male Video	Nominated
1991	MTV Video Music Awards	Best Video from a Film	Nominated

== Personnel ==
Partial credits from various sources.

- Jon Bon Jovi – lead vocals, acoustic rhythm guitar, piano
- Jeff Beck – lead and slide guitars
- Benmont Tench – Hammond organ
- Randy Jackson – bass
- Kenny Aronoff – drums

== Charts ==
=== Weekly charts ===
Chart (1990)	Peak position
Australia (ARIA)	1
Austria (Ö3 Austria Top 40)	2
Belgium (Ultratop 50 Flanders)	21
Belgium (VRT Top 30 Flanders)	13
Canada Top Singles (RPM)	1
Europe (Eurochart Hot 100)	15
Finland (Suomen virallinen lista)	2
Ireland (IRMA)	3
Luxembourg (Radio Luxembourg)	8
Netherlands (Dutch Top 40)	18
Netherlands (Single Top 100)	16
New Zealand (Recorded Music NZ)	1
Norway (VG-lista)	3
Sweden (Sverigetopplistan)	3
Switzerland (Schweizer Hitparade)	5
UK Singles (Official Charts)	13
US Billboard Hot 100	1
US Mainstream Rock Airplay (Billboard)	1
US Cash Box Top 100	1
West Germany (GfK)	16

Chart (2007)	Peak position
US Digital Song Sales (Billboard)	45

=== Year-end charts ===
Chart (1990)	Position
Australia (ARIA)	20
Europe (Eurochart Hot 100)	66
Germany (Media Control)	87
New Zealand (RIANZ)	4
Sweden (Topplistan)	15
Switzerland (Schweizer Hitparade)	22
US Billboard Hot 100	10
US Album Rock Tracks (Billboard)	20
US Cash Box Top 100	5

== Sales and certifications ==
Region	Certification	Certified units/sales
Australia (ARIA)	Platinum	70,000^{^}
New Zealand (RMNZ)	Platinum	30,000^{‡}
United Kingdom (BPI)	Silver	200,000^{‡}
United States (RIAA)	Platinum	1,000,000^{^}
^{^} Shipments figures based on certification alone.^{‡} Sales+streaming figures based on certification alone.

== Release history ==
Region	Date	Format(s)	Label(s)	Ref.
Japan	July 5, 1990	Mini-CD	Mercury	
United States	July 10, 1990	7-inch vinyl; CD; cassette	Mercury	
Australia	August 6, 1990	7-inch vinyl; CD; cassette	Mercury	
