= These Days Tour =

1995–96 concert tour by Bon Jovi

- Tour by Bon Jovi
- Poster to the concert in Ostend, Belgium
- Start date: April 26, 1995
- End date: July 19, 1996
- Legs: 6
- No. of shows: 55 in Europe; 45 in North America; 6 in Oceania; 3 in Africa; 7 in South America; 16 in Asia; 132 in total

Bon Jovi concert chronology
- Crossroad Promo Tour (1994); These Days Tour (1995–1996); Crush Tour (2000)

These Days Tour was Bon Jovi's concert tour during 1995-96. Van Halen and Bon Jovi's Mercury Records labelmate Ugly Kid Joe opened as a special guest for Bon Jovi on twenty of the European stadium dates during the second leg promoting their album Balance and Menace To Sobriety respectively. The last of the three Wembley Stadium gigs was filmed for the DVD Live From London. The band played 131 shows in 35 countries all across the world. The tour was the first with current bassist Hugh McDonald.

== Personnel ==
- Jon Bon Jovi - lead vocals, guitar, maracas for Keep the Faith, tambourine for Hey God
- Richie Sambora - lead guitar, backing vocals, talkbox, lead vocals for Stranger In This Town
- David Bryan - keyboards, backing vocals, tambourine for Something to Believe In
- Hugh McDonald - bass guitar, backing vocals
- Tico Torres - drums, percussion, lead vocals for Crazy

== Set list ==
The set list varied on a nightly basis on this tour, but usually featured several songs from the These Days album, such as "Hey God", "Something for the Pain", and "This Ain't a Love Song". It also included many of their hits from the 1980s such as "Livin' on a Prayer", "You Give Love a Bad Name", and "Bad Medicine".

1. "Rockin' in the Free World"
2. "Livin' on a Prayer"
3. "You Give Love a Bad Name"
4. "Hey God"
5. "Keep the Faith"
6. "These Days"
7. "Lie To Me"
8. "Someday I'll Be Saturday Night"
9. "Something for the Pain"
10. "Because the Night"(cover)
11. "Damned"
12. "Blaze of Glory"
13. "Lay Your Hands on Me"
14. "I'll Sleep When I'm Dead" (with snippets of "Jumpin' Jack Flash" and "Papa Was a Rollin' Stone")
15. "Bad Medicine" / "Shout"

Encore

16. "Always"
17. "Wanted Dead or Alive"
18. "Blood on Blood"

Encore 2

19. "Runaway"
20. "This Ain't a Love Song"

== Tour dates ==
List of concerts, showing date, city, country, venue
Date	City	Country	Venue
Asia
April 26, 1995	Mumbai	India	Andheri Sports Complex
April 28, 1995	Taipei	Taiwan	Taipei Municipal Stadium
April 30, 1995	Quezon City	Philippines	Araneta Coliseum
May 2, 1995	Bangkok	Thailand	Royal Thai Army Stadium
May 4, 1995	Kuala Lumpur	Malaysia	Stadium Negara
May 6, 1995	Jakarta	Indonesia	Taman Impian Jaya Ancol
May 8, 1995	Singapore		Singapore Indoor Stadium
May 10, 1995	Seoul	South Korea	Olympic Stadium
May 13, 1995	Fukuoka	Japan	Fukuoka Dome
May 16, 1995	Nishinomiya	Japan	Hankyu Nishinomiya Stadium
May 18, 1995	Tokyo	Japan	Tokyo Dome
Europe
May 23, 1995	Milan	Italy	Expo Arena Milano Concerti
May 26, 1995	Bremen	Germany	Weserstadion
May 27, 1995	Bremen	Germany	Weserstadion
May 28, 1995	Nijmegen	Netherlands	Goffertpark
May 30, 1995	Essen	Germany	Georg-Melches-Stadion
June 1, 1995	Chemnitz	Germany	Sportforum
June 3, 1995	Munich	Germany	Olympiastadion
June 4, 1995	Adenau	Germany	Nürburgring
June 6, 1995	Berlin	Germany	Waldbühne
June 7, 1995	Berlin	Germany	Waldbühne
June 10, 1995	Basel	Switzerland	St. Jakob Stadium
June 11, 1995	Spielberg	Austria	Österreichring
June 13, 1995	Barcelona	Spain	Estadi Olímpic de Montjuïc
June 15, 1995	Lisbon	Portugal	Estádio José Alvalade
June 17, 1995	Werchter	Belgium	Werchter festival ground
June 18, 1995	Lahr	Germany	Flughafen Lahr
June 21, 1995	Cardiff	Wales	Cardiff Arms Park
June 23, 1995	London	England	Wembley Stadium
June 24, 1995	London	England	Wembley Stadium
June 25, 1995	London	England	Wembley Stadium
June 27, 1995	Gateshead	England	Gateshead International Stadium
June 28, 1995	Sheffield	England	Don Valley Stadium
June 30, 1995	Paris	France	Hippodrome de Longchamp
July 1, 1995	Paris	France	Hippodrome de Longchamp
July 2, 1995	Dublin	Ireland	RDS Arena
July 4, 1995	Stockholm	Sweden	Sjöhistoriska Museet
July 6, 1995	Rotterdam	Netherlands	Stadion Feijenoord
July 7, 1995	Odense	Denmark	Dyrskuepladsen
July 8, 1995	Turku	Finland	Ruissalo
North America
July 21, 1995	Wantagh	United States	Jones Beach Amphitheatre
July 22, 1995	Wantagh	United States	Jones Beach Amphitheatre
July 23, 1995	Wantagh	United States	Jones Beach Amphitheatre
July 25, 1995	Camden	United States	Blockbuster-Sony Music Entertainment Centre
July 27, 1995	Burgettstown	United States	Coca-Cola Star Lake Amphitheatre
July 30, 1995	Mansfield	United States	Great Woods Center
August 1, 1995	Saratoga Springs	United States	Saratoga Performing Arts Center
August 2, 1995	Montreal	Canada	Montreal Forum
August 3, 1995	Montreal	Canada	Montreal Forum
August 5, 1995	Grand Falls-Windsor	Canada	Centennial Park
August 7, 1995	Halifax	Canada	Garrison Grounds At Citadel Hill
August 9, 1995	Columbia	United States	Merriweather Post Pavilion
August 11, 1995	Milwaukee	United States	Marcus Amphitheater
August 12, 1995	Tinley Park	United States	New World Music Theatre
August 15, 1995	Minneapolis	United States	Target Center
August 16, 1995	Bonner Springs	United States	Sandstone Amphitheater
August 18, 1995	Morrison	United States	Red Rocks Amphitheater
August 20, 1995	Park City	United States	Wolf Mountain Amphitheatre
August 23, 1995	Maryland Heights	United States	Riverport Amphitheatre
August 24, 1995	Noblesville	United States	Deer Creek Music Center
August 26, 1995	Clarkston	United States	Pine Knob Music Theatre
August 27, 1995	Cincinnati	United States	Riverbend Music Center
August 29, 1995	Scranton	United States	Montage Mountain Amphitheater
August 30, 1995	Cuyahoga Falls	United States	Blossom Music Center
September 1, 1995	Syracuse	United States	New York State Fair
September 3, 1995	Toronto	Canada	Molson Canadian Amphitheatre
September 4, 1995	Hartford	United States	The Meadows Music Theatre
September 10, 1995	Tampa	United States	USF Sun Dome
September 12, 1995	Charlotte	United States	Blockbuster Pavilion
September 13, 1995	Charlotte	United States	Blockbuster Pavilion
September 15, 1995	Raleigh	United States	Hardee's Walnut Creek Amphitheatre
September 16, 1995	Atlanta	United States	Coca-Cola Lakewood Amphitheatre
September 19, 1995	Chattanooga	United States	UTC Arena
September 20, 1995	Nashville	United States	Starwood Amphitheatre
September 23, 1995	The Woodlands	United States	Cynthia Woods Mitchell Pavilion
September 24, 1995	Dallas	United States	Coca-Cola Starplex Amphitheatre
September 26, 1995	Phoenix	United States	Blockbuster Desert Sky Pavilion
September 29, 1995	Inglewood	United States	Great Western Forum
September 30, 1995	Concord	United States	Concord Pavilion
October 3, 1995	Vancouver	Canada	General Motors Place
October 4, 1995	Edmonton	Canada	Northlands Coliseum
October 5, 1995	Saskatoon	Canada	Saskatchewan Place
October 7, 1995	Winnipeg	Canada	Winnipeg Arena
Latin America
October 22, 1995	Mexico City	Mexico	Palacio de los Deportes
October 24, 1995	Caracas	Venezuela	Estadio Independencia De La Rinconada
October 27, 1995	Rio de Janeiro	Brazil	Praça da Apoteose
October 28, 1995	São Paulo	Brazil	Pista de Atletismo Ibirapuera
October 29, 1995	Curitiba	Brazil	Pedreira Paulo Leminski
October 31, 1995	Quito	Ecuador	Estadio Olímpico Atahualpa
November 2, 1995	Bogotá	Colombia	Estadio El Campín
November 4, 1995	Buenos Aires	Argentina	Estadio Antonio Vespucio Liberti
Oceania
November 8, 1995	Auckland	New Zealand	Ericsson Stadium
November 10, 1995	Melbourne	Australia	Olympic Park Stadium
November 11, 1995	Melbourne	Australia	Olympic Park Stadium
November 12, 1995	Adelaide	Australia	Adelaide Street Circuit
November 17, 1995	Brisbane	Australia	Brisbane Stadium
November 18, 1995	Sydney	Australia	Eastern Creek International Raceway
Africa
November 28, 1995	Cape Town	South Africa	Green Point Stadium
November 30, 1995	Johannesburg	South Africa	Johannesburg Stadium
December 1, 1995	Johannesburg	South Africa	Johannesburg Stadium
December 3, 1995	Durban	South Africa	Kings Park Stadium
Asia
May 14, 1996	Fukuoka	Japan	Fukuoka Dome
May 16, 1996	Osaka	Japan	Hankyu Nishinomiya Sutajiamu
May 18, 1996	Yokohama	Japan	Yokohama Stadium
May 19, 1996	Yokohama	Japan	Yokohama Stadium
May 20, 1996	Yokohama	Japan	Yokohama Stadium
Europe
June 1, 1996	Madrid	Spain	Estadio Vicente Calderón
June 4, 1996	Gijón	Spain	Estadio El Molinón
June 5, 1996	Pamplona	Spain	Estadio El Sadar
June 8, 1996	Landgraaf	Netherlands	Megaland
June 9, 1996	Enschede	Netherlands	Het Rutbeek
June 11, 1996	Bettembourg	Luxembourg	Krakelshaff
June 13, 1996	Erfurt	Germany	Steigerwaldstadion
June 15, 1996	Hannover	Germany	Niedersachsenstadion
June 16, 1996	Stuttgart	Germany	Cannstatter Wasen
June 18, 1996	Budapest	Hungary	Óbudai-sziget
June 20, 1996	Wiener Neustadt	Austria	Flugplatz Wiener Neustadt
June 21, 1996	Wels	Austria	Wels Air Base
June 23, 1996	Zürich	Switzerland	Letzigrund
June 28, 1996	Cologne	Germany	Müngersdorfer Stadion
June 29, 1996	Cologne	Germany	Müngersdorfer Stadion
June 30, 1996	Frankfurt	Germany	Waldstadion
July 2, 1996	Ostend	Belgium	Wellingtonrenbaan
July 3, 1996	Paris	France	Palais Omnisports de Paris-Bercy
July 6, 1996	Milton Keynes	England	National Bowl
July 7, 1996	Milton Keynes	England	National Bowl
July 9, 1996	Manchester	England	Maine Road
July 11, 1996	Glasgow	Scotland	Ibrox Stadium
July 13, 1996	Dublin	Ireland	RDS Arena
July 14, 1996	Wolfsburg	Germany	Volkswagen Festival Site
July 16, 1996	Nuremberg	Germany	Frankenstadion
July 19, 1996	Helsinki	Finland	Helsinki Olympic Stadium

=== Box office score data ===
Venue	City	Tickets Sold / Available	Gross Revenue
Jones Beach Theatre	Wantagh	32,586 / 32,586	$1,140,510
Montreal Forum	Montreal	31,251 / 31,984	$856,612
Palacio de los Deportes	Mexico City	41,996 / 41,996	$1,161,203
RDS	Dublin	30,000 / 30,000	$1,075,000

The total attendance of the 3 South African shows was 182,000.

=== Cancelled dates ===
List of cancelled concerts showing date, city, country, venue, and reason for cancellation
Date	City	Country	Venue	Reason
November 14, 1995	Perth (cancelled)	Australia	Burswood Dome	Unknown
