= Lie to Me (Bon Jovi song) =

1995 single by Bon Jovi

Single by Bon Jovi

from the album These Days
- A-side: "Something for the Pain" (US only)
- B-side: "Wild in the Streets" (live); "634-5789"
- Released: November 13, 1995
- Length: 5:34
- Label: Mercury
- Songwriters: Jon Bon Jovi; Richie Sambora
- Producers: Jon Bon Jovi; Richie Sambora; Peter Collins

Bon Jovi singles chronology
"Something for the Pain" (1995)	"Lie to Me" (1995)	"These Days" (1996)

Music video
- "Lie to Me" on YouTube

"Lie to Me" is a song by American rock band Bon Jovi. It was released on November 13, 1995, by Mercury Records, as the third single from their sixth album, These Days (1995). The song is about a broken relationship which involves lovers who face crises and struggles. It charted at number 76 on the US Billboard Hot 100, number 10 on the UK Singles Chart, and number nine on the Finnish Singles Chart.

Although a fan favorite, Bon Jovi only performed "Lie to Me" live two times since the conclusion of the These Days Tour, with one being on June 25, 2008, and the other on July 17, 2011.

== Track listings ==
- US CD, 7-inch, and cassette single (with "Something for the Pain")
1. "Something for the Pain" (edit) – 3:57
2. "Lie to Me" – 5:33
- US maxi-CD single (with "Something for the Pain")
1. "Something for the Pain" – 4:46
2. "Lie to Me" – 5:33
3. "Wild in the Streets" (live) – 5:01
4. "634-5789" – 3:08
- UK CD1; Australian CD and cassette single
1. "Lie to Me" (album version) – 5:33
2. "Something for the Pain" (album version) – 4:46
3. "Hey God" (live) – 6:16
4. "I'll Sleep When I'm Dead" (live) – 7:34
- UK CD2
1. "Lie to Me" (edit) – 4:43
2. "Something for the Pain" (live) – 5:30
3. "Always" (live) – 7:18
4. "Keep the Faith" (live) – 7:22
- UK cassette single and European CD single
1. "Lie to Me" – 5:33
2. "I'll Sleep When I'm Dead" (live) – 7:34 (5:36 in Europe)
- Australian limited-edition CD single
1. "Lie to Me" – 5:33
2. "Something for the Pain" (live) – 5:36
3. "Always" (live) – 7:35
4. "Keep the Faith" (live) – 7:24
- Japanese CD1
1. "Lie to Me" (album version)
2. "Something for the Pain" (live)
3. "Always" (live)
4. "I'll Sleep When I'm Dead" (live)
- Japanese CD2
1. "Lie to Me" (radio edit version)
2. "Keep the Faith" (live)
3. "Hey God" (live)
4. "634-5789"

== Charts ==
Chart (1995)	Peak position
Australia (ARIA)	20
Austria (Ö3 Austria Top 40)	20
Belgium (Ultratop 50 Flanders)	23
Belgium (Ultratop 50 Wallonia)	16
Canada Top Singles (RPM)	20
Canada Adult Contemporary (RPM)	20
Europe (Eurochart Hot 100)	36
Europe (European Hit Radio)	16
Finland (Suomen virallinen lista)	9
France (SNEP)	32
Germany (GfK)	46
Japan (Oricon)	42
Netherlands (Dutch Top 40)	18
Netherlands (Single Top 100)	16
Scottish Singles Sales (Official Charts)	10
Sweden (Sverigetopplistan)	44
Switzerland (Schweizer Hitparade)	20
UK Singles (Official Charts)	10
US Billboard Hot 100 with "Something for the Pain"	76
US Cash Box Top 100	73

== Certifications ==
Region	Certification	Certified units/sales
Australia (ARIA)	Gold	35,000^{‡}
^{‡} Sales+streaming figures based on certification alone.

== Release history ==
Region	Date	Format(s)	Label(s)	Ref(s).
United States	November 7, 1995	Contemporary hit radio	Mercury	
United Kingdom	November 13, 1995	CD; cassette	Mercury	
Australia	November 27, 1995	CD	Mercury	
Australia	December 4, 1995	Limited-edition CD	Mercury	
Japan	January 1, 1996	CD	Mercury	
