= List of UK Rock & Metal Singles Chart number ones of 1995 =

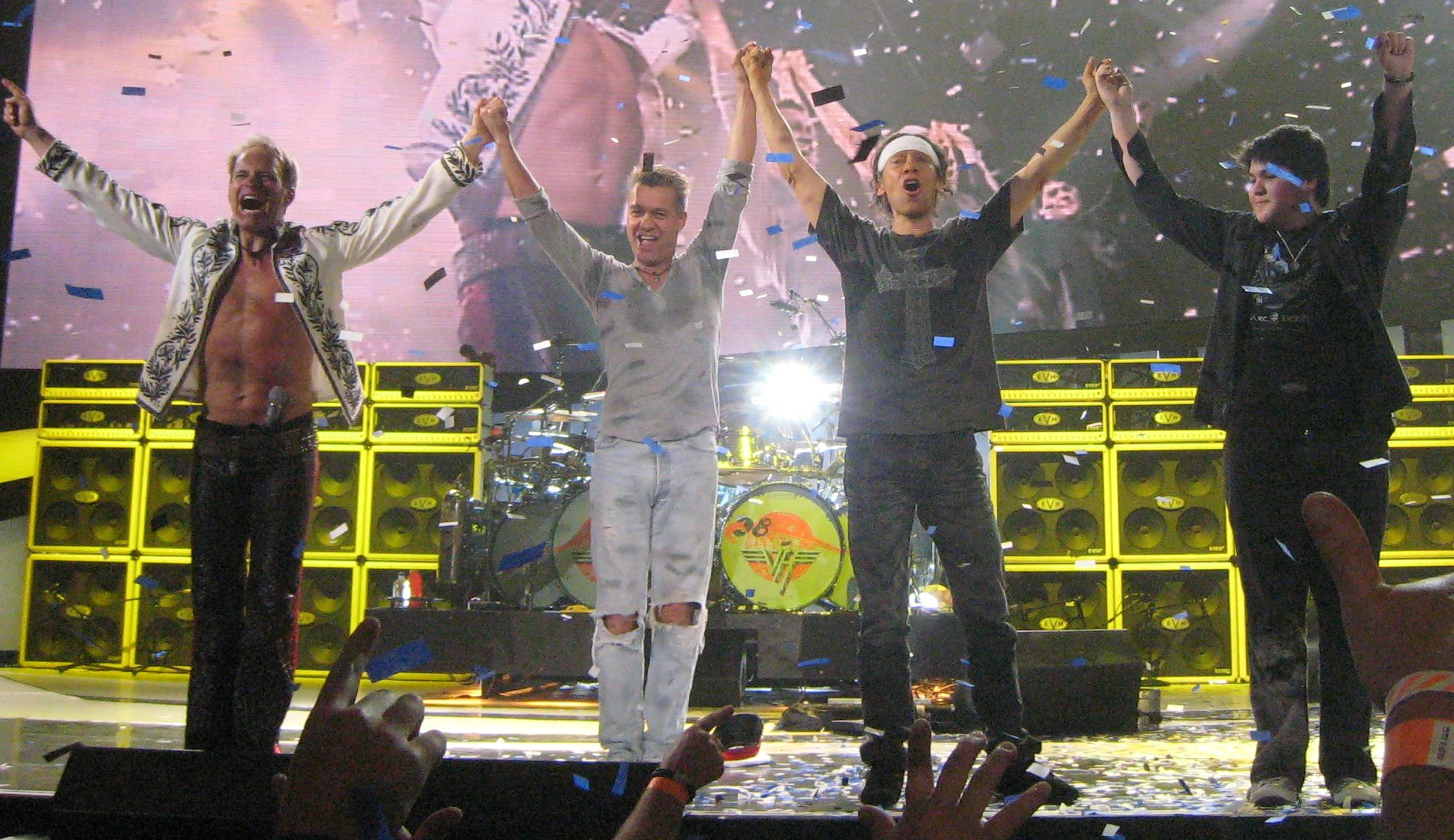
"Don't Tell Me (What Love Can Do)" by Van Halen was the longest-running number-one single of 1995, spending seven weeks atop the chart.

The UK Rock & Metal Singles Chart is a record chart which ranks the best-selling rock and heavy metal songs in the United Kingdom. Compiled and published by the Official Charts Company, the data is based on each track's weekly physical sales, digital downloads and streams. In 1995, there were 25 singles that topped the 52 published charts. The first number-one single of the year was Van Halen's "Don't Tell Me (What Love Can Do)", which spent the first seven weeks of the year at number one. The final number-one single of the year was "When Love & Hate Collide" by Def Leppard, which spent the last two weeks of the year atop the chart.

The most successful songs on the UK Rock & Metal Singles Chart in 1995 was Van Halen's "Don't Tell Me (What Love Can Do)", which spent seven weeks at number one. The band also spent two weeks at number one with "Can't Stop Lovin' You". Def Leppard's "When Love & Hate Collide" spent six weeks at number one, Bon Jovi were number one for five weeks with "This Ain't a Love Song" (five weeks) and "Something for the Pain", Whale's "Hobo Humpin' Slobo Babe" was number one for four weeks, and Therapy? spent a total of four weeks at number one with three singles. The Offspring's "Gotta Get Away" was number one for three weeks, Faith No More spent three weeks at number one with three different songs, and songs by Terrorvision, Gun, The Wildhearts and Ugly Kid Joe were number one for two weeks each.

== Chart history ==
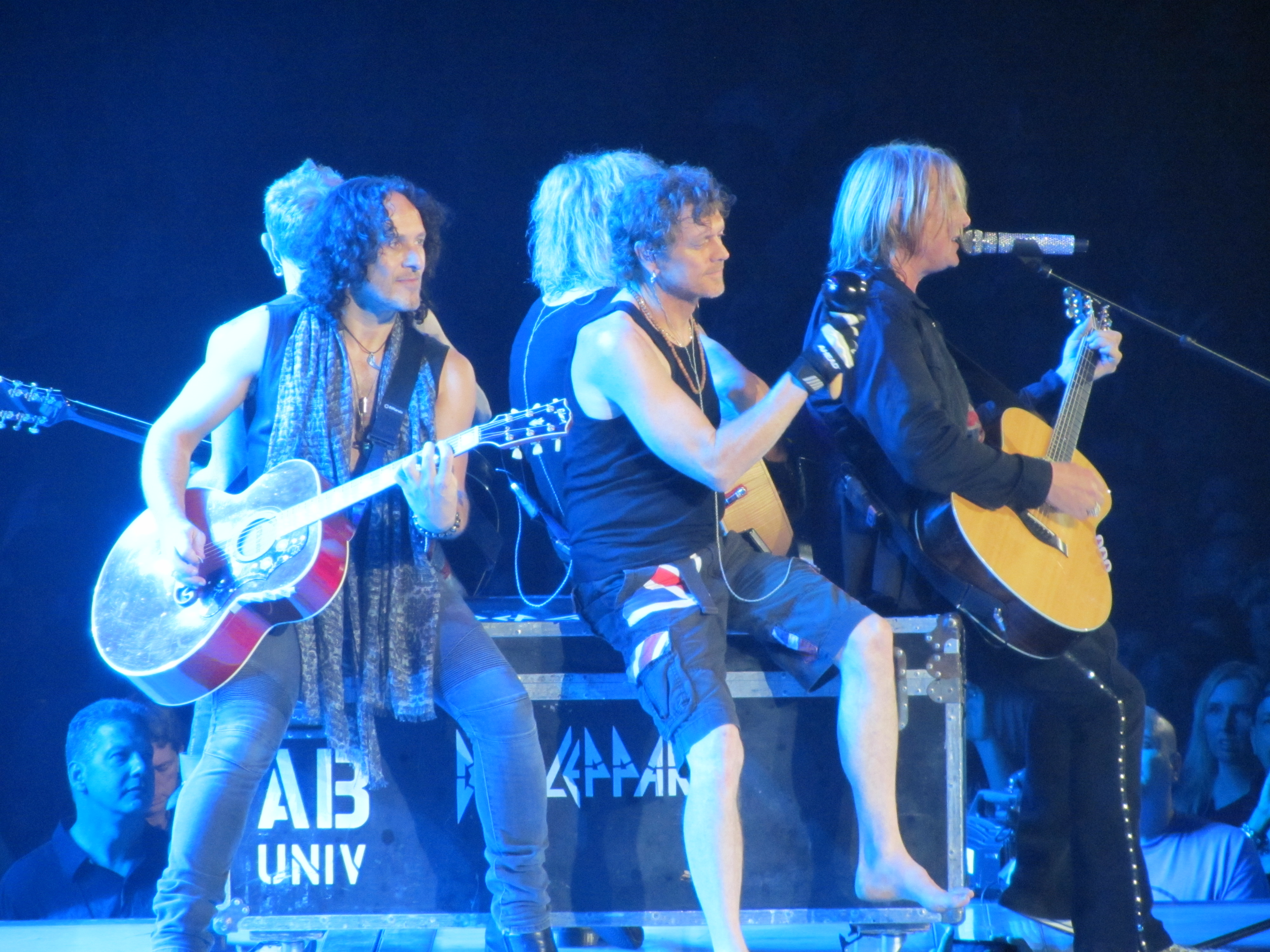
Def Leppard spent six weeks at number one on the chart in 1995 with "When Love & Hate Collide".

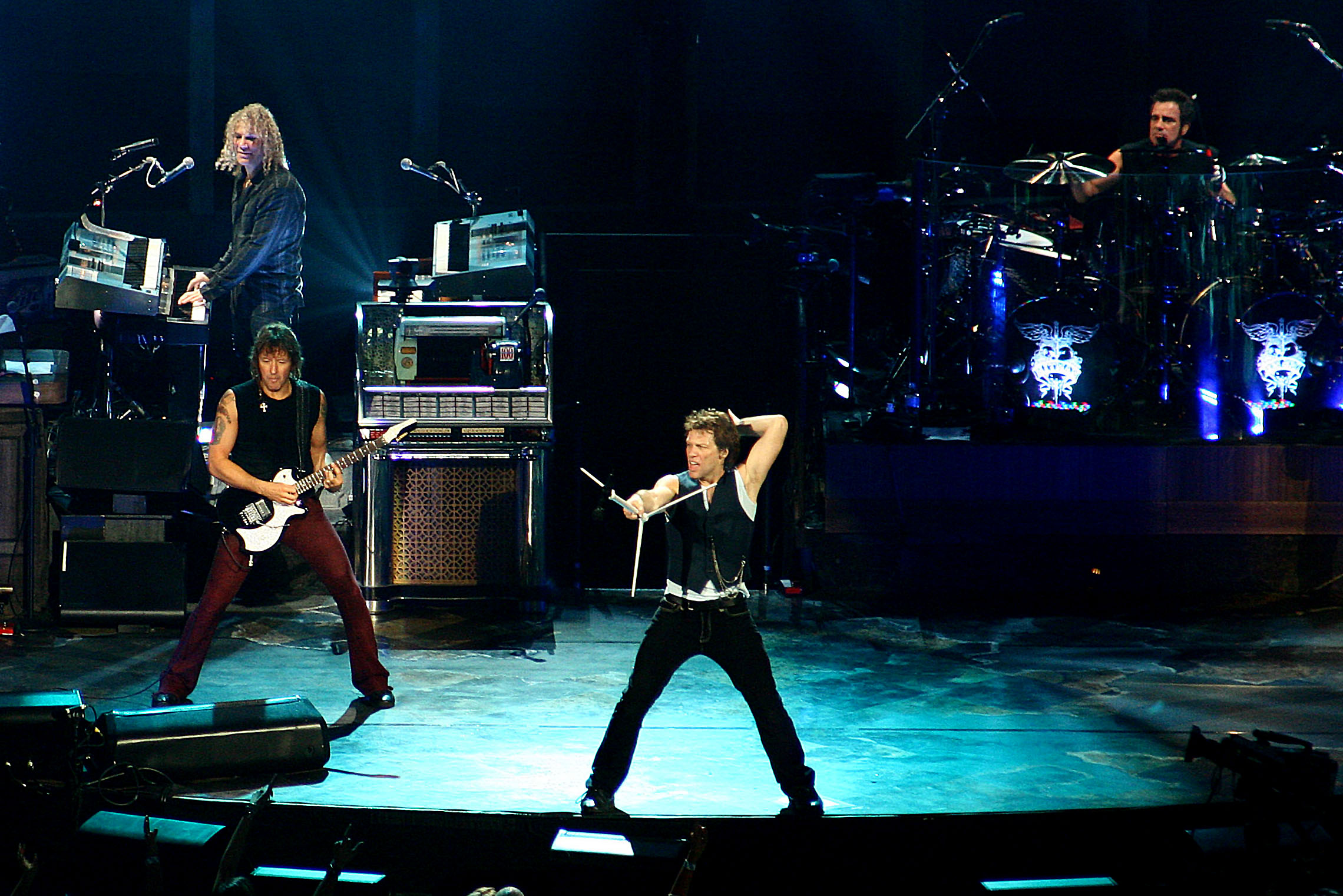
Bon Jovi spent five weeks at number one with "This Ain't a Love Song" and one with "Something for the Pain".

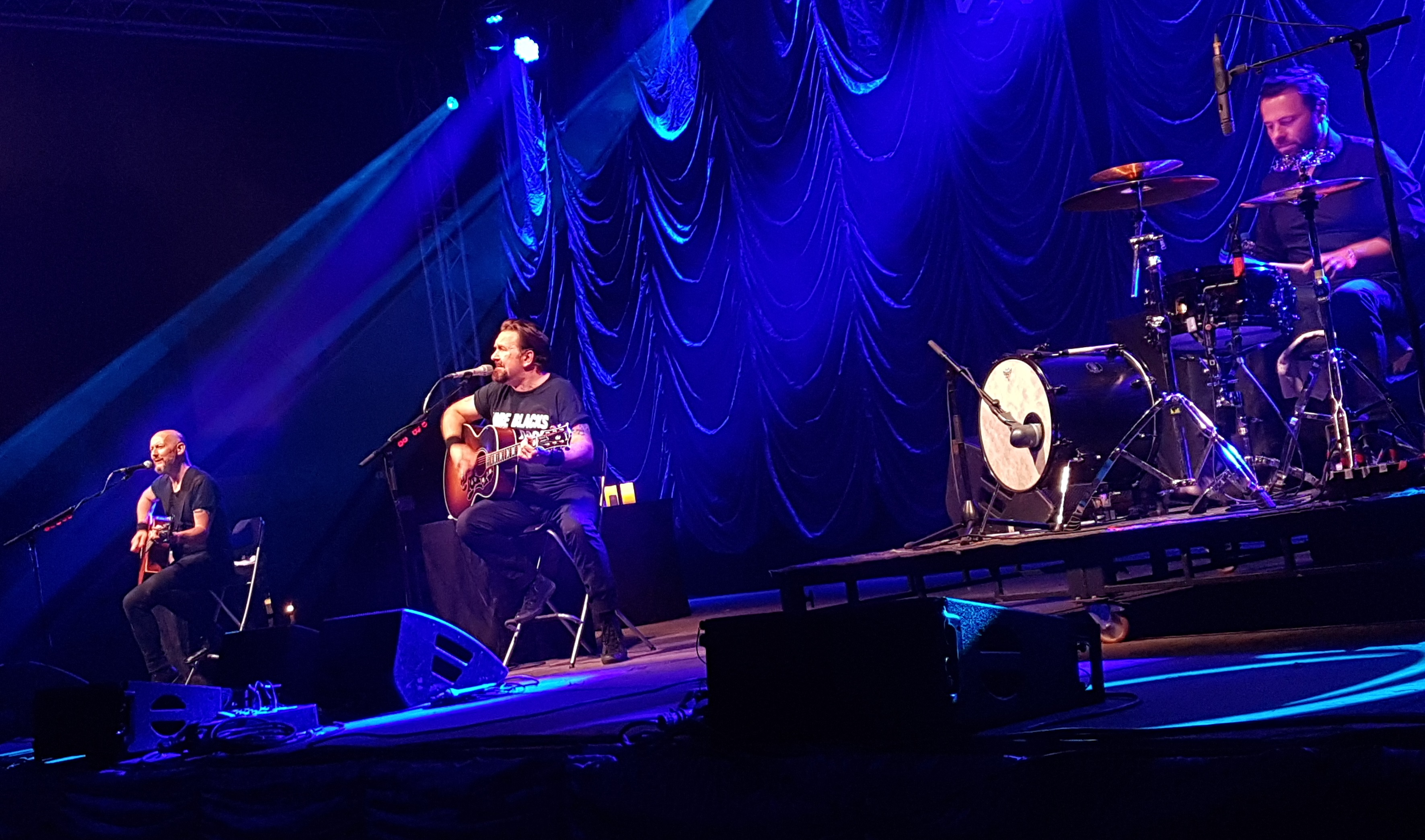
Therapy? topped the charts with three different singles in 1995, spending a total four weeks at number one.

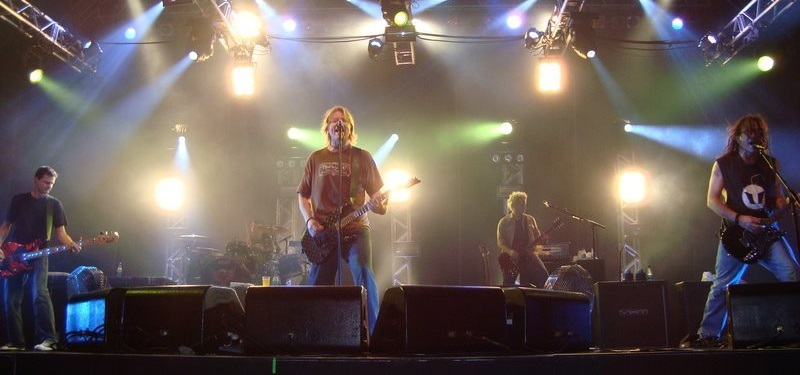
The Offspring's "Gotta Get Away" was number one for three weeks.

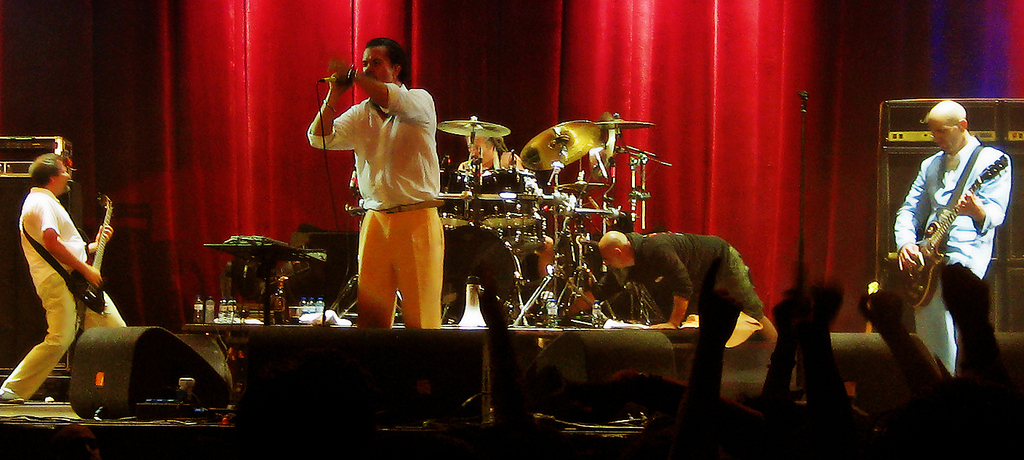
Faith No More reached number one with three different singles in 1995.

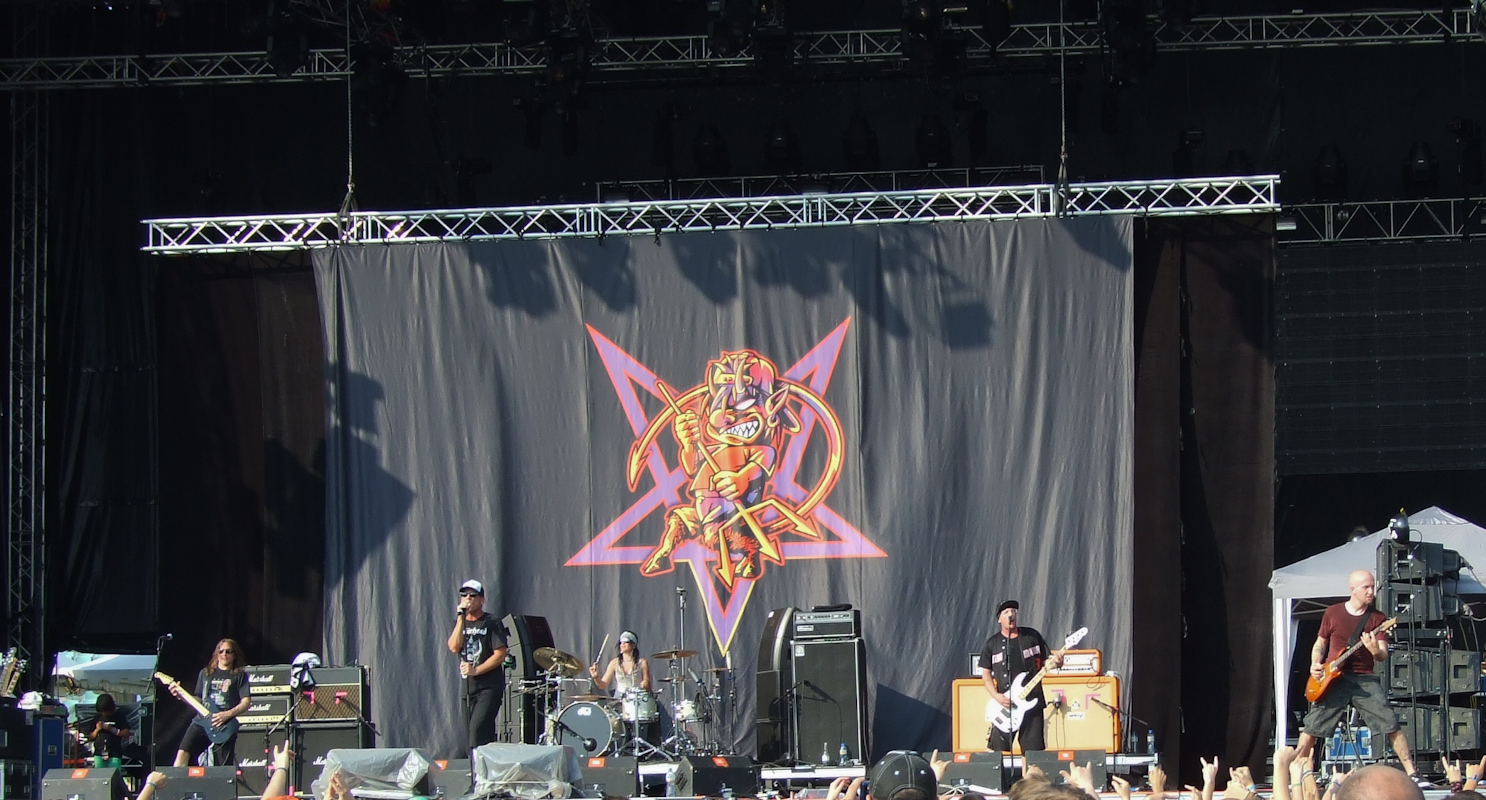
Ugly Kid Joe's "Milkman's Son" spent two weeks at number one in 1995.

Issue date	Single	Artist(s)	Record label(s)	Ref.
21 January	"Don't Tell Me (What Love Can Do)"	Van Halen	Warner Bros.	
28 January	"Don't Tell Me (What Love Can Do)"	Van Halen	Warner Bros.	
4 February	"Don't Tell Me (What Love Can Do)"	Van Halen	Warner Bros.	
11 February	"Don't Tell Me (What Love Can Do)"	Van Halen	Warner Bros.	
18 February	"Don't Tell Me (What Love Can Do)"	Van Halen	Warner Bros.	
25 February	"Don't Tell Me (What Love Can Do)"	Van Halen	Warner Bros.	
4 March	"Don't Tell Me (What Love Can Do)"	Van Halen	Warner Bros.	
11 March	"Digging the Grave"	Faith No More	Slash	
18 March	"Some People Say"	Terrorvision	Total Vegas	
25 March	"Some People Say"	Terrorvision	Total Vegas	
1 April	"Can't Stop Lovin' You"	Van Halen	Warner Bros.	
8 April	"Can't Stop Lovin' You"	Van Halen	Warner Bros.	
15 April	"Something Worthwhile"	Gun	A&M	
22 April	"Something Worthwhile"	Gun	A&M	
29 April	"Freaky Be Beautiful"	Moist	Chrysalis	
6 May	"I Wanna Go Where the People Go"	The Wildhearts	East West	
13 May	"I Wanna Go Where the People Go"	The Wildhearts	East West	
20 May	"Take Me Down to the River"	Skin	Parlophone	
27 May	"Ricochet"	Faith No More	Slash	
3 June	"Stories"	Therapy?	A&M	
10 June	"This Ain't a Love Song"	Bon Jovi	Mercury	
17 June	"This Ain't a Love Song"	Bon Jovi	Mercury	
24 June	"This Ain't a Love Song"	Bon Jovi	Mercury	
1 July	"This Ain't a Love Song"	Bon Jovi	Mercury	
8 July	"Milkman's Son"	Ugly Kid Joe	Mercury	
15 July	"Milkman's Son"	Ugly Kid Joe	Mercury	
22 July	"Wiser Time"	The Black Crowes	American	
29 July	"Evidence"	Faith No More	Slash	
5 August	"Loose"	Therapy?	A&M	
12 August	"Loose"	Therapy?	A&M	
19 August	"Gotta Get Away"	The Offspring	Out of Step	
26 August	"Gotta Get Away"	The Offspring	Out of Step	
2 September	"Gotta Get Away"	The Offspring	Out of Step	
9 September	"Serenity in Murder"	Slayer	American	
16 September	"I'll Stick Around"	Foo Fighters	Roswell	
23 September	"In a Broken Dream"	Thunder	EMI	
30 September	"Something for the Pain"	Bon Jovi	Mercury	
7 October	"Man on the Edge"	Iron Maiden	EMI	
14 October	"When Love & Hate Collide"	Def Leppard	Bludgeon Riffola	
21 October	"When Love & Hate Collide"	Def Leppard	Bludgeon Riffola	
28 October	"When Love & Hate Collide"	Def Leppard	Bludgeon Riffola	
4 November	"When Love & Hate Collide"	Def Leppard	Bludgeon Riffola	
11 November	"Grind"	Alice in Chains	Columbia	
18 November	"Diane"	Therapy?	A&M	
25 November	"Hobo Humpin' Slobo Babe"	Whale	Hut	
2 December	"Hobo Humpin' Slobo Babe"	Whale	Hut	
9 December	"Hobo Humpin' Slobo Babe"	Whale	Hut	
16 December	"Hobo Humpin' Slobo Babe"	Whale	Hut	
23 December	"When Love & Hate Collide"	Def Leppard	Bludgeon Riffola	
30 December	"When Love & Hate Collide"	Def Leppard	Bludgeon Riffola	

== See also ==
- 1995 in British music
- List of UK Rock & Metal Albums Chart number ones of 1995
