= List of UK Rock & Metal Albums Chart number ones of 1995 =

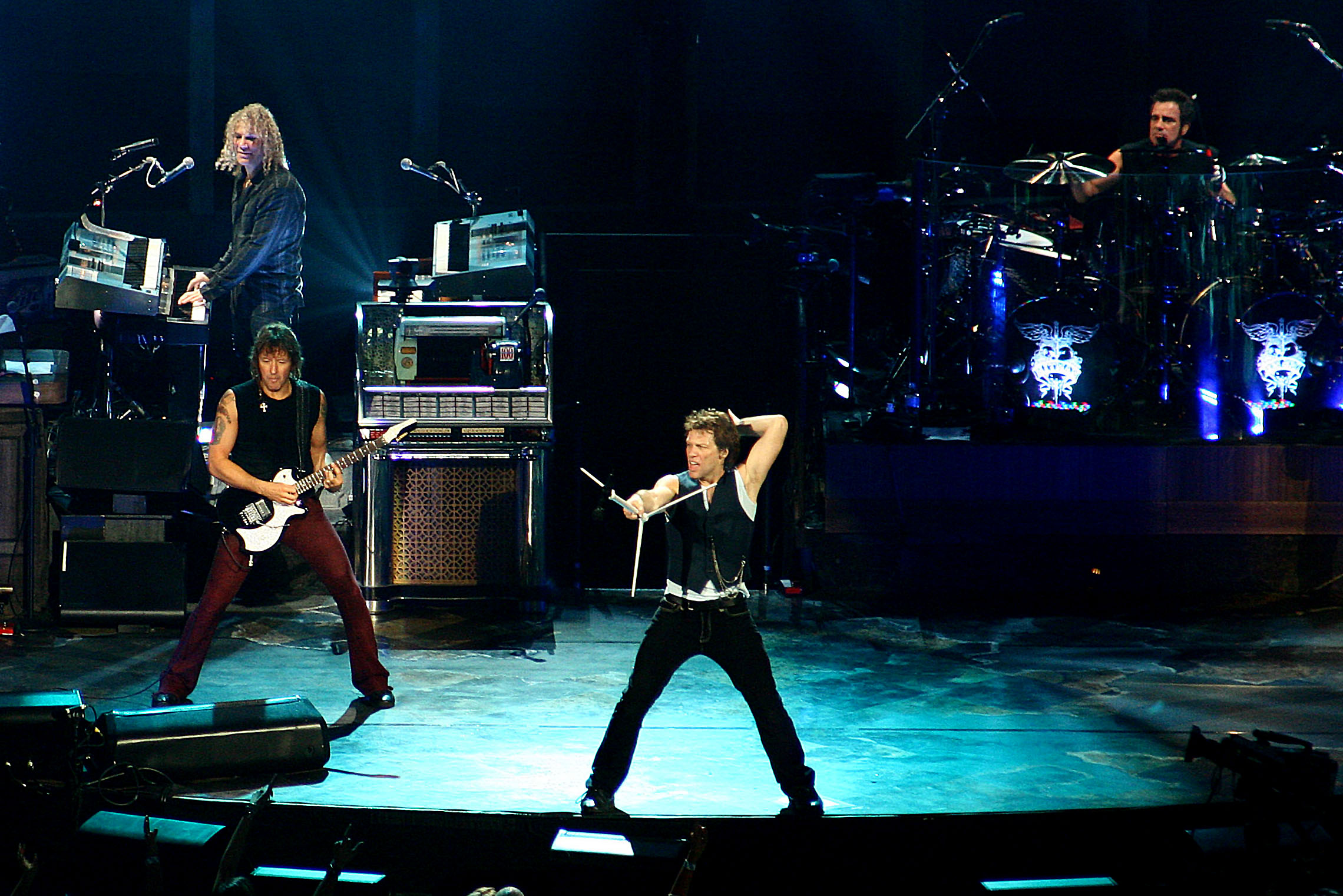
Bon Jovi's These Days was the longest-running UK Rock & Metal Albums Chart number-one album of 1995, spending nine weeks atop the chart.

The UK Rock & Metal Albums Chart is a record chart which ranks the best-selling rock and heavy metal albums in the United Kingdom. Compiled and published by the Official Charts Company, the data is based on each album's weekly physical sales, digital downloads and streams. In 1995, there were 21 albums that topped the 52 published charts. The first number-one album of the year was the Bon Jovi compilation Cross Road, which remained at number one following a reign at the end of the previous year. The final number-one album of the year was Queen's final studio album Made in Heaven, which spent the last seven weeks of the year at number one.

The most successful album on the UK Rock & Metal Albums Chart in 1995 was Bon Jovi's sixth studio album These Days, which spent nine consecutive weeks at number one between 1 July and 26 August. Queen's Made in Heaven spent the last seven weeks of 1995 at number one and was the best-selling rock album of the year, ranking fifth in the UK End of Year Albums Chart. Green Day's third studio album Dookie also spent seven weeks at number one in 1995, while the follow-up Insomniac gave the band another two atop the chart. The Offspring's third studio album Smash was number one for three weeks, while four more albums – It's Five O'Clock Somewhere by Slash's Snakepit, P.H.U.Q. by The Wildhearts, One Hot Minute by Red Hot Chili Peppers and Ballbreaker by AC/DC – each spent two weeks at number one on the chart in 1995.

== Chart history ==
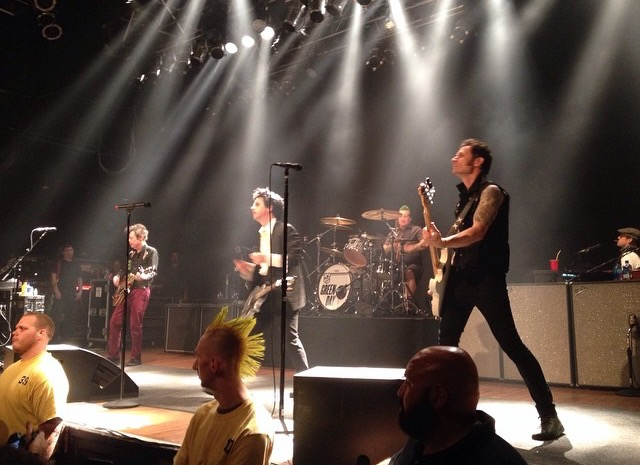
Green Day spent nine weeks at number one on the chart in 1995 – seven with Dookie and two with Insomniac.

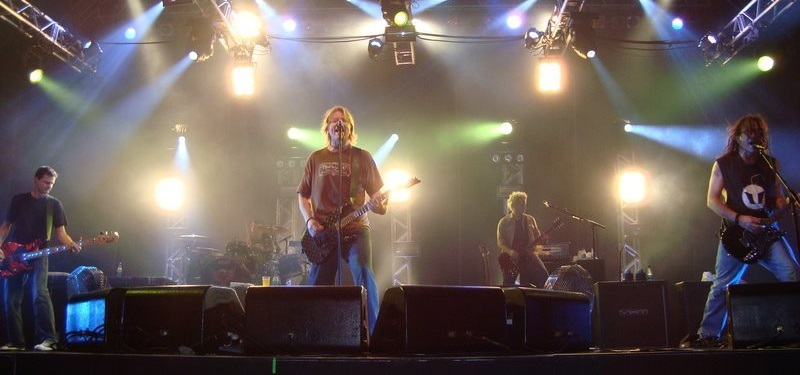
The Offspring's third studio album Smash was number one for three weeks during September 1995.

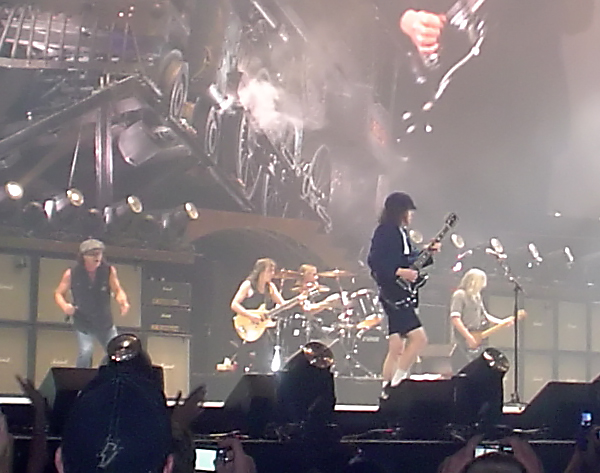
AC/DC were number one for two weeks in 1995 with their twelfth international studio album Ballbreaker.

Key
| † | Indicates best-selling rock album of 1995 |

| Issue date | Album | Artist(s) | Record label(s) | Ref. |
|---|---|---|---|---|
| 21 January | Cross Road | Bon Jovi | Mercury | |
| 28 January | MTV Unplugged in New York | Nirvana | Geffen | |
| 4 February | Behind Closed Doors | Thunder | EMI | |
| 11 February | Waiting for the Punchline | Extreme | A&M | |
| 18 February | Dookie | Green Day | Reprise | |
| 25 February | It's Five O'Clock Somewhere | Slash's Snakepit | Geffen | |
| 4 March | It's Five O'Clock Somewhere | Slash's Snakepit | Geffen | |
| 11 March | Cross Road | Bon Jovi | Mercury | |
| 18 March | Cross Road | Bon Jovi | Mercury | |
| 25 March | Youthanasia | Megadeth | Capitol | |
| 1 April | King for a Day... Fool for a Lifetime | Faith No More | Slash | |
| 8 April | Subhuman Race | Skid Row | Atlantic | |
| 15 April | Dookie | Green Day | Reprise | |
| 22 April | Dookie | Green Day | Reprise | |
| 29 April | Dookie | Green Day | Reprise | |
| 6 May | Dookie | Green Day | Reprise | |
| 13 May | Dookie | Green Day | Reprise | |
| 20 May | Dookie | Green Day | Reprise | |
| 27 May | Astro-Creep: 2000 | White Zombie | Geffen | |
| 3 June | P.H.U.Q. | The Wildhearts | East West | |
| 10 June | P.H.U.Q. | The Wildhearts | East West | |
| 17 June | Menace to Sobriety | Ugly Kid Joe | Mercury | |
| 24 June | Infernal Love | Therapy? | A&M | |
| 1 July | These Days | Bon Jovi | Mercury | |
| 8 July | These Days | Bon Jovi | Mercury | |
| 15 July | These Days | Bon Jovi | Mercury | |
| 22 July | These Days | Bon Jovi | Mercury | |
| 29 July | These Days | Bon Jovi | Mercury | |
| 5 August | These Days | Bon Jovi | Mercury | |
| 12 August | These Days | Bon Jovi | Mercury | |
| 19 August | These Days | Bon Jovi | Mercury | |
| 26 August | These Days | Bon Jovi | Mercury | |
| 2 September | Smash | The Offspring | Epitaph | |
| 9 September | Smash | The Offspring | Epitaph | |
| 16 September | Smash | The Offspring | Epitaph | |
| 23 September | One Hot Minute | Red Hot Chili Peppers | Warner Bros. | |
| 30 September | One Hot Minute | Red Hot Chili Peppers | Warner Bros. | |
| 7 October | Ballbreaker | AC/DC | East West | |
| 14 October | Ballbreaker | AC/DC | East West | |
| 21 October | Insomniac | Green Day | Reprise | |
| 28 October | Insomniac | Green Day | Reprise | |
| 4 November | Vault: Def Leppard Greatest Hits (1980–1995) | Def Leppard | Bludgeon Riffola | |
| 11 November | Welcome to the Neighborhood | Meat Loaf | Virgin | |
| 18 November | Made in Heaven † | Queen | Parlophone | |
| 25 November | Made in Heaven † | Queen | Parlophone | |
| 2 December | Made in Heaven † | Queen | Parlophone | |
| 9 December | Made in Heaven † | Queen | Parlophone | |
| 16 December | Made in Heaven † | Queen | Parlophone | |
| 23 December | Made in Heaven † | Queen | Parlophone | |
| 30 December | Made in Heaven † | Queen | Parlophone | |

== See also ==
- 1995 in British music
- List of UK Rock & Metal Singles Chart number ones of 1995
