= Live from London (Bon Jovi video) =

Live from London 1995
- Cover of the VHS

Video by Bon Jovi
- Released: 1995 (VHS and Laserdisc); November 4th, 1998 (DVD) (USA & Canada); September 15th, 2003 (DVD) (International)
- Recorded: June 25, 1995
- Venue: Wembley Stadium (London)
- Genre: Rock
- Length: 90 minutes
- Label: Polygram Video
- Producer: Andy Picheta

Bon Jovi chronology
Cross Road (1994)	Live from London 1995 (1995)	The Crush Tour (2000)

Live From London is a live concert video from the American rock band Bon Jovi. It was the band's first concert video and was shot at Wembley Stadium on June 25, 1995, in front of 72,000 fans on the These Days Tour.

== Overview ==
Directed by David Mallet and produced by Andy Picheta, the release shows Bon Jovi performing some of their staple live hits, and also some songs from their album These Days. The approximate running time is 90 minutes, as some songs from the concert were cut from this release. For the production, Mallett and Picheta earned a nomination for Best Long Form Music Video at the 39th Annual Grammy Awards.

The last track "These Days" is a new music video of the song featuring concert clips rather than a live performance.

== Track listing ==
1. "Livin' on a Prayer"
2. "You Give Love a Bad Name"
3. "Keep the Faith"
4. "Always"
5. "Blaze of Glory" (Jon Bon Jovi Cover)
6. "Lay Your Hands on Me"
7. "I'll Sleep When I'm Dead" / "Papa Was a Rolling Stone" (Medley)
8. "Bad Medicine" / "Shout" (Medley)
9. "Hey God"
10. "Wanted Dead or Alive"
11. "This Ain't a Love Song"
12. "Closing Credits"
13. "These Days" (Music Video - featuring concert clips)
14. "Logos"

== Band personnel ==
- Jon Bon Jovi (lead vocals, guitar)
- Richie Sambora (guitar, backing vocals)
- Tico Torres (drums)
- David Bryan (keyboards, backing vocals)

with

- Hugh McDonald (bass, backing vocals)
- Steven Van Zandt (guitar, backing vocals)
- Bob Geldof (backing vocals)

== Available on the following formats ==
- VHS
- Video CD
- DVD

== Additional information ==
- The concert was originally released on VHS in 1995, then worldwide on DVD in 2003. It was also later included in the Cross Road: Deluxe Sound & Vision box set in 2005, although for some reason, despite appearing on the disc, the song Lay Your Hands on Me is not credited as featuring on this release.
- The DVD version contained no additional material or extra features, nor was the existing material remastered. The concert is in letterboxed widescreen and in 2.0 stereo. The material itself is therefore, identical to the VHS version.
- The "These Days" bonus video was compiled from footage from the Live From London concert, using the full studio track, and is not the same as the "These Days" promo video.

== Certifications ==
Region	Certification	Certified units/sales
Argentina (CAPIF)	Platinum	8,000^{^}
Brazil (Pro-Música Brasil)	Gold	25,000^{*}
United Kingdom (BPI)	2× Platinum	100,000^{*}
United States (RIAA)	Gold	50,000^{^}
^{*} Sales figures based on certification alone.^{^} Shipments figures based on certification alone.
