= The Exciting Wilson Pickett =

Studio album by Wilson Pickett
- Released: August 1966
- Recorded: May 12, 1965–May 8, 1966
- Studios: Memphis, Tennessee and Muscle Shoals, Alabama
- Genre: Southern soul
- Length: 30:54
- Labels: Atlantic; 8129
- Producers: Jerry Wexler, Steve Cropper, Jim Stewart, Rick Hall, Tom Dowd

Wilson Pickett chronology
In the Midnight Hour (1965)	The Exciting Wilson Pickett (1966)	The Wicked Pickett (1966)

Singles from The Exciting Wilson Pickett
- 1. "In the Midnight Hour" Released: June 1965; 2. "634-5789 (Soulsville, U.S.A.)" Released: January 1966; 3. "Ninety-nine and a Half (Won't Do)" Released: May 1966; 4. "Land of 1,000 Dances" Released: July 1966

Professional ratings
Review scores
Source	Rating
AllMusic	4.5/5 stars
The Encyclopedia of Popular Music	4/5 stars

The Exciting Wilson Pickett, released in 1966, was the third album by R&B and soul singer Wilson Pickett. The album charted at No. 3 on the U.S. Billboard R&B albums chart and No. 21 on the popular albums chart, becoming the highest-charting studio album of Pickett's career. The making of the album saw Pickett end his relationship with Stax Studios in Memphis, Tennessee, where he had cut his early singles, and move to Fame Studios in Muscle Shoals, Alabama, where he would record for the next two years. According to AllMusic, this album firmly established Picket's "stature as a major '60s soul man". The album launched four major hits for Pickett, but AllMusic emphasizes that the album cuts, "of nearly an equal level", will be of more interest to collectors.

Originally released on the Atlantic label, the album has been re-issued on CD by Rhino, Collectables and Warner Bros. Records. In 2007, a new LP edition was released by the label 4 Men with Beards.

== Hit singles ==
The Exciting Wilson Pickett launched four crossover hit singles. "In the Midnight Hour" reached No. 1 on the Billboard R&B singles chart and No. 21 on the pop singles chart. "Land of a Thousand Dances" reached No. 1 and No. 6 respectively, his biggest pop hit. "Ninety-nine and a Half (Won't Do)" reached No. 13 and No. 53. "634-5789 (Soulsville, U.S.A.)", a song which Pickett had not on first hearing liked, reached No. 1 and No. 13.

Pickett later redid the song "Land of a Thousand Dances", originally a hit in 1963 for New Orleans–based composer Chris Kenner, for the soundtrack of The Great Outdoors, a 1988 film starring Dan Aykroyd and John Candy.

== Track listing ==
1. "Land of 1000 Dances" (Chris Kenner) – 2:28
2. "Something You Got" (Kenner) – 2:58
3. "634-5789 (Soulsville, U.S.A.)" (Steve Cropper, Eddie Floyd) – 3:00
4. "Barefootin'" (Robert Parker) – 2:22
5. "Mercy Mercy" (Don Covay, Ronald Dean Miller) – 2:30
6. "You're So Fine" (Lance Finney, Willie Schofield, Robert West) – 2:38
7. "In the Midnight Hour" (Cropper, Wilson Pickett) – 2:36
8. "Ninety-nine and a Half (Won't Do)" (Cropper, Floyd, Pickett) – 2:44
9. "Danger Zone" (Cropper, Pickett) – 2:12
10. "I'm Drifting" (Homer Banks, Pickett, David Porter) – 2:54
11. "It's All Over" (Cropper, Pickett) – 2:21
12. "She's So Good to Me" (Bobby Womack) – 2:17
- Tracks 1, 2, 4–6, 12 recorded May 9–11, 1966, in Muscle Shoals
- Track 7 recorded May 12, 1965 in Memphis
- Tracks 9, 11 recorded September 16, 1965, in Memphis
- Tracks 3, 8, 10 recorded December 20, 1965, in Memphis

== Personnel ==
- Wilson Pickett – vocals
- Albert "Junior" Lowe (tracks 1, 2, 4–6, 12), Donald Dunn (tracks 3, 7–11) – bass guitar
- Steve Cropper (tracks 3, 7–11), Jimmy Johnson (tracks 1, 2, 4–6, 12), Chips Moman (tracks 1, 2, 4–6, 12) Tommy Cogbill (tracks 1, 2, 4–6, 12) – guitar
- Isaac Hayes (tracks 3, 8–11), Spooner Oldham (tracks 1, 2, 4–6, 12), Joe Hall (track 7) – piano
- Roger Hawkins (tracks 1, 2, 4–6, 12), Al Jackson Jr. (tracks 3, 7–11) – drums
- Wayne Jackson, Gene "Bowlegs" Miller (tracks 9, 11) – trumpet
- Charles "Packy" Axton (tracks 3, 7–11), Andrew Love, Charles Chalmers (tracks 1, 2, 4–6, 12) – tenor saxophone
- Floyd Newman – baritone saxophone
- John (Jack) Peck – trumpet (all tracks except 9, 11)

Production

- Haig Adishian – cover design
- Steve Cropper – supervisor
- Tom Dowd – engineer, supervisor
- A. Scott Galloway – liner notes
- Rick Hall – engineer, supervisor
- Dan Hersch – digital remastering
- Bill Inglot – digital remastering
- John Peck
- Bob Rolontz – liner notes
- Nick Samardge – front cover photography
- Jim Stewart – engineer, supervisor
- Jerry Wexler – supervisor
