= Andy Picheta =

- Born: 21 October 1957 (age 68); Ealing, Middlesex, England
- Occupations: Television director, film director, theatrical producer, line producer, television producer, film producer
- Years active: 1980–present
- Spouse: Rebecca Ferrand (1995–present)
- Awards: 2004 Emmy Award for Outstanding Directing of Comedy, Entertainment or variety Show. Nominated for Grammy Award, 1997, for Best Music Video, Long Form for Bon Jovi: Live From London.

Andy Picheta is a director and producer of film and television, music videos and musical concerts.

Picheta has produced music videos and concerts for musicians including Bon Jovi, AC/DC, Lionel Richie, Madonna, Prince, U2 and The Jacksons, and has produced several film adaptations of popular musicals including Oklahoma!, Joseph and the Technicolor Dreamcoat, Cats, The Merchant of Venice and Kiss Me Kate. He has worked regularly alongside several leaders of their respective genres, including Andrew Lloyd Webber and Trevor Nunn.

Picheta's musicals and entertainment work earned him an Emmy Award in 2004 for directing Elaine Stritch: At Liberty, a biographical film documenting the star's career. In 1996 Picheta was nominated for a Grammy for directing Bon Jovi's concert at Wembley Stadium the previous year. Picheta is known for his affiliation with rock band Bon Jovi, for whom he has also directed several music videos. In 2011, he produced Michael Forever, a tribute concert to Michael Jackson held in Cardiff.

== Career ==
Picheta produced Bon Jovi: Live from London, which took place at Wembley Stadium, though he has also directed Bon Jovi videos. He then filmed theatre productions, notably those of Andrew Lloyd Webber's, including Joseph and the Amazing Technicolored Dreamcoat, and Cats. He also produced the 1999 musical version of Oklahoma!, starring Hugh Jackman and directed by Trevor Nunn. In 1998 and 1999 Picheta directed and produced three musicals, (Cats, Joseph and the Amazing Technicolored Dreamcoat and Oklahoma!), as well as the Andrew Lloyd Webber: The Royal Albert Hall Celebration. Picheta produced The Merchant of Venice in 2001 and then producing the film version of Kiss Me, Kate, which had previously run for 1,077 stage performances on Broadway. In 2004, he was nominated for an Emmy Award, for his directing of Elaine Stritch at Liberty, a biographical film of the stage star Elaine Stritch, documenting her career and personal life.

In early 2008, Picheta was line producer in the latest television adaptation of Shakespeare's King Lear for the Royal Shakespeare Company. The film featured in Channel 4's Christmas line-up, screened in the evening of Christmas Day.

== Personal life ==
Picheta was born in Ealing, west London in the late 1950s. He attended Gunnersbury Grammar School before attending Harrow Film School.

== Awards & Reviews ==
=== Awards ===
Picheta was nominated for a Grammy Award for 'Best Live Performance of the Year' for his work on Bon Jovi: Live in London, a concert hosted a Wembley Stadium, the ceremony was hosted in New York City.

In 2004, Picheta was nominated for an Emmy Award for Outstanding Directing for his work on 'Elaine Stritch: Live at Liberty'. The show won the Emmy for Variety Special.

== Filmography ==
=== Director ===
Year	Title
2002	Elaine Stritch: At Liberty
1998	The Christmas Angel: A Story on Ice
1997	Mannheim Steamroller
2003	Kiss Me Kate
1996	Anthea Turner Body Basics

=== Producer ===
Year	Title
2011	Michael Forever – The Tribute Concert
2008	King Lear
2003	Kiss Me, Kate
2001	The Merchant of Venice (line producer)
1999	Joseph and the Amazing Technicolor Dreamcoat
1999	Oklahoma!
1998	Cats
1998	Andrew Lloyd Webber: The Royal Albert Hall Celebration
1997	Lord of the Dance
1995	Bon Jovi: Live From London
