= These Days (Bon Jovi song) =

1996 single by Bon Jovi

Single by Bon Jovi

from the album These Days
- Released: February 26, 1996
- Length: 6:28 (album version); 4:31 (single edit)
- Label: Mercury
- Songwriters: Jon Bon Jovi; Richie Sambora
- Producers: Jon Bon Jovi; Richie Sambora; Peter Collins

Bon Jovi singles chronology
"Lie to Me" (1995)	"These Days" (1996)	"Hey God" (1996)

Music video
- "These Days" on YouTube

"These Days" is a song by American rock band Bon Jovi. It was released on February 26, 1996, by Mercury Records, as the fourth single from their sixth studio album, These Days (1995). It was written by Jon Bon Jovi and Richie Sambora, and produced by them with Peter Collins. The single peaked at number seven in the United Kingdom and reached the top 10 in Lithuania.

== Background ==
"These Days" showcases the darker tone that Jon Bon Jovi and Richie Sambora’s lyrics sought to achieve with the album. The song which begins with a haunting piano progression, deals with homelessness, loss of innocence and the difficulty of keeping up a relationship in the modern age. It is about people out there trying to be understood, to live their dreams.

== Critical reception ==
Gina Morris from Smash Hits gave the song two out of five, writing, "'These Days' is an up-tempo rock ballad, all about people living sad lives and wanting to be somebody else. He even makes a passing reference to Kurt Cobain."

== Track listings ==
- Australasian CD single
1. "These Days" (edit) – 4:29
2. "634-5789" – 3:08
3. "(It's Hard) Letting You Go" (live) – 6:45
4. "Rocking in the Free World" (live) – 5:53
- UK CD1
1. "These Days" (edit) – 4:31
2. "Someday I'll Be Saturday Night" – 4:38
3. "These Days" (live) – 5:57
4. "Helter Skelter" (live) – 3:20
- UK CD2
1. "These Days" (edit) – 4:31
2. "634-5789" – 3:08
3. "Rocking in the Free World" (live) – 5:53
4. "(It's Hard) Letting You Go" (live) – 6:45
- UK cassette single and European CD single
1. "These Days" (edit) – 4:31
2. "634-5789" – 3:08
- Japanese CD single
1. "These Days" – 6:27
2. "The End" (demo) – 3:40
3. "When She Comes" (demo) – 3:28
4. "Lonely at the Top" (demo) – 4:17
- Japanese mini-album
1. "These Days" (edit)
2. "(It's Hard) Letting You Go" (live)
3. "Rocking in the Free World" (live)
4. "Helter Skelter" (live)
5. "Hey God" (live)
6. "These Days" (live)

== Charts ==
Chart (1996)	Peak position
Australia (ARIA)	38
Europe (Eurochart Hot 100)	40
Germany (GfK)	61
Iceland (Íslenski Listinn Topp 40)	25
Ireland (IRMA)	22
Japan (Oricon)	37
Lithuania (M-1)	10
Netherlands (Dutch Top 40)	33
Netherlands (Single Top 100)	45
Scotland Singles (OCC)	8
Switzerland (Schweizer Hitparade)	31
UK Singles (OCC)	7
UK Rock & Metal (OCC)	1

== Release history ==
Region	Date	Format(s)	Label(s)	Ref(s).
United Kingdom	February 26, 1996	CD; cassette	Mercury	
Japan	April 10, 1996	CD	Mercury	
