= Rebecca Ferrand =

British film and television producer

- Born: Devon, England
- Occupations: Television producer, film director, line producer,
- Years active: 1991–present
- Spouse: Andy Picheta (1995–present)

Rebecca Ferrand is a British film and television producer. She produced the controversial animated series Popetown, worked as an associate producer for Catterick, and produced the Channel 4 television show Blunder. During her career Ferrand has worked primarily in comedy, and alongside Simon Pegg, Matt Lucas, Vic Reeves and comedy partner Bob Mortimer, Ruby Wax, Mackenzie Crook and Ben Miller.

== Career ==
Ferrand started her television career as an assistant accountant for acclaimed TV mini-series G.B.H, a drama series starring Robert Lindsay and Julie Walters. She followed this up with other similar jobs before producing Anthea Turner: Body Basics in 1996 and Mannheim Steamroller: Christmas Live, a Christmas performance on ice from Mannheim Steamroller which was directed by Ferrand's partner Andy Picheta, the second of their four behind-camera collaborations. In 1998, she was production manager for Andrew Lloyd Webber: The Royal Albert Hall Celebration, an anniversary celebration of the star's career. The same year, she produced the musical Cats starring John Mills. Ferrand started the 21st century by line producing Running Time, a thriller written by Simon Beaufoy, the writer of The Full Monty and Slumdog Millionaire, and in 2002 line producing The Falklands Play in 2002.

In 2004, Ferrand produced Catterick, a successful comedy show starring Vic Reeves and Bob Mortimer, and in 2005 started producing Popetown, the animated comedy that would become hugely controversial and infamous. The show parodied the lives of the Pope, priests and Cardinals, and starred Ruby Wax and Matt Lucas. The series was condemned by the Catholic Church and banned from television release, but has had successful DVD sales. the following year she produced Blunder for Channel 4.

== Personal life ==
Ferrand lives with her partner Andy Picheta.

== Filmography ==
=== As producer ===
Year	Title
2006	Blunder
2005	Popetown
2001	The Merchant of Venice (line producer)
2004	Catterick
1999	The Falklands Play
2000	Running Time
1998	Andrew Lloyd Webber: The Royal Albert Hall Celebration
1997	Mannheim Steamroller: The Christmas Angel

=== As Production Associate ===
Year	Title	Role	Notes
1998	Cats		
