= Hey God =

1996 single by Bon Jovi

Single by Bon Jovi

from the album These Days
- B-side: "The End"; "When She Comes"; "House of the Rising Sun" (live)
- Released: June 24, 1996
- Genre: Rock
- Length: 6:11
- Label: Mercury
- Songwriters: Jon Bon Jovi; Richie Sambora
- Producers: Jon Bon Jovi; Richie Sambora; Peter Collins

Bon Jovi singles chronology
"These Days" (1996)	"Hey God" (1996)	"Real Life" (1999)

Music videos
- "Hey God" on YouTube
- "Hey God" (Long Version) on YouTube

"Hey God" is a song from American rock band Bon Jovi's sixth studio album, These Days (1995), released as the album's fifth and final single on June 24, 1996. Although it did not chart in the United States, it became a moderate hit in Canada and several European countries.

== Background ==
As with most of the songs on These Days, "Hey God" is one of Bon Jovi's darker songs. It brings together different stories of people living on the edge of breakdown and despair, such as a father who claims his family are "two paychecks away from living out on the street", a single mother with a wayward son who has been convicted of killing a police officer, and a young man growing up in the ghetto. Throughout the course of the song, each of these characters cries out for spiritual help.

Richie Sambora said that his inspiration for the song came when he was sitting in his limo and made eye contact with a derelict huddling in a cardboard box on the pavement. Sambora's sense of guilt at this was immense and discussed the incident with Jon Bon Jovi, who was inspired by the view out of the window from 57th St. and Broadway in New York, where a man wearing an Armani suit was next to a man who's sleeping on the street. They then wrote the song in Jon's basement.

== Chart performance ==
The song charted at number 13 on the UK Singles Chart and number 44 on Canada's RPM 100 Hit Tracks chart.

== Live performances ==
"Hey God", like most of the songs from the album, is rarely played live by the band. A performance of the song can be seen as part of the encore from the Live From London DVD. In 2008, the song made a comeback in some of the band's concerts during their Lost Highway Tour.

== Track listings ==
UK CD1

1. "Hey God" (edit) – 4:47
2. "The End" – 3:39
3. "When She Comes" – 3:29
4. "Hey God" (live from South Africa) – 7:17

UK CD2

1. "Hey God" (edit) – 4:47
2. "House of the Rising Sun" (live) – 4:00
3. "Livin' on a Prayer" – 4:12

UK cassette single

1. "Hey God" (edit) – 4:47
2. "Lie to Me" (remix) – 4:40

European CD single

1. "Hey God" (edit) – 4:47
2. "These Days" (live) – 5:57

European maxi-CD single

1. "Hey God" (edit) – 4:47
2. "When She Comes" – 3:29
3. "The End" – 3:39
4. "These Days" (live) – 5:57

Japanese CD1

1. "Hey God" (LP version) – 6:10
2. "Fields of Fire" (demo) – 4:10
3. "Mrs. Robinson" (live) – 3:21
4. "I Thank You" – 3:14
5. "Let's Make It Baby" (demo) – 6:19

Japanese CD2

1. "Hey God" (edit) – 4:47
2. "Crazy" (live) – 3:29
3. "Tumblin' Dice" (live) – 4:17
4. "Heaven Help Us" (live) – 4:34

== Charts ==
Chart (1995–1996)	Peak position
Canada Top Singles (RPM)	44
Europe (Eurochart Hot 100)	58
Finland (Suomen virallinen lista)	18
Iceland (Íslenski Listinn Topp 40)	35
Netherlands (Dutch Top 40)	37
Netherlands (Single Top 100)	27
Scottish Singles Sales (Official Charts)	14
UK Singles (Official Charts)	13
UK Rock & Metal (Official Charts)	1

== Release history ==
Region	Date	Format(s)	Label(s)	Ref(s).
United Kingdom	June 24, 1996	CD; cassette	Mercury	
Japan	October 5, 1996	CD	Mercury	
