= These Days (Bon Jovi album) =

Studio album by Bon Jovi
- Released: June 27, 1995
- Recorded: 1994–1995
- Studios: Sixteenth Avenue Sound (Nashville, Tennessee); A&M (Hollywood, California); Bearsville (Woodstock, New York); Ocean Way (Hollywood, California); One on One (North Hollywood, California)
- Genre: Rock
- Length: 63:55
- Label: Mercury
- Producers: Peter Collins; Jon Bon Jovi; Richie Sambora

Bon Jovi chronology
Cross Road (1994)	These Days (1995)	Crush (2000)

Singles from These Days
- 1. "This Ain't a Love Song" Released: May 23, 1995; 2. "Something for the Pain" Released: September 5, 1995; 3. "Lie to Me" Released: November 13, 1995; 4. "These Days" Released: February 26, 1996; 5. "Hey God" Released: June 24, 1996

These Days (stylized as (these Days)) is the sixth studio album by American rock band Bon Jovi, released on June 27, 1995, by Mercury Records. This was the first album Bon Jovi released after the dismissal of original bassist Alec John Such, and their first album to be recorded officially as a quartet (without an official bassist, but featuring Hugh McDonald as a session/touring member on bass guitar). The album, produced by Peter Collins, Jon Bon Jovi and Richie Sambora, is praised by many critics and fans as their best album. These Days is overall a darker album in contrast to the band's usual brand of feel-good, inspiring rock songs and love ballads.

At the time of release, the album was a huge commercial success, especially in the European and Asian markets. It became the band's fifth and fourth consecutive number one album in Australia and the United Kingdom. In the United Kingdom, These Days replaced Michael Jackson's album HIStory at number one on the UK Albums Chart and spent four consecutive weeks at No. 1. The album spawned four Top 10 singles on the UK Singles Chart, the band's highest number of Top 10 singles from one album in the UK. The high sales of the album in Europe warranted a re-issue of the album under the name of These Days Special Edition a year after its original release.

The album was ranked number two on Q magazine's list of the "Top 50 albums of 1995". The album was also voted the album of the year in British magazine Kerrang!'s readers poll in 1995. In 2006, the album featured in the Classic Rock and Metal Hammer 's The "200 Greatest Albums of the 90s". In the U.S., despite selling 1 million copies and being certified platinum by the Recording Industry Association of America (RIAA), the album peaked at number nine on the Billboard 200.

== Background ==
When the Keep the Faith Tour ended in December 1993, Jon Bon Jovi went on a vacation in January 1994 where he wrote "Something to Believe In", the first song written for the album. Over the next nine months, Jon Bon Jovi and Richie Sambora wrote and demoed forty songs. The album was originally slated to be released in the fourth quarter of 1994, but they asked for more time to write additional material. Because of that, they released Cross Road, their first greatest hits album, with two new songs in October 1994.

== Recording and production ==
Jon Bon Jovi hired Peter Collins to produce the album, based on his prior work with several acts such as Rush, Queensrÿche and Alice Cooper. Jon Bon Jovi and Richie Sambora were co-producers of the album. They made a start recording the album in Nashville in the fall of 1994. After a week to ten days of recording, during October 1994, Jon Bon Jovi erased it all. Recording continued over the next four months and it shifted between Jon Bon Jovi's home studio Sanctuary I in Woodstock, NY, and three separate studios in Los Angeles: One On One Studios, Ocean Way Recording, and A&M Studios. There were various reasons why so many different studios were used.

One reason for studio changes, while recording in Woodstock, NY, was industrial metal band Fear Factory were recording their album Demanufacture in a neighboring studio. Bon Jovi's engineers repeatedly complained about the volume Fear Factory were recording at as it was bleeding into their drum mics.

Regardless, all the basic tracks except for "Diamond Ring" and "(It's Hard) Letting You Go" were recorded in Woodstock, NY. All the rhythm guitar parts were recorded in Los Angeles and all the keyboards were recorded in New Jersey. Most vocals were done in New Jersey. Very little was done in Nashville: one vocal and one or two keyboard parts. "Diamond Ring" and "(It's Hard) Letting You Go" were recut in Los Angeles. The album was mixed by Bob Clearmountain in Los Angeles.

Then the band embarked on a mini Christmas tour of clubs in December 1994 and they continued to promote Cross Road. On December 17, 1994, Richie Sambora married Heather Locklear.

== Composition ==
=== Music ===
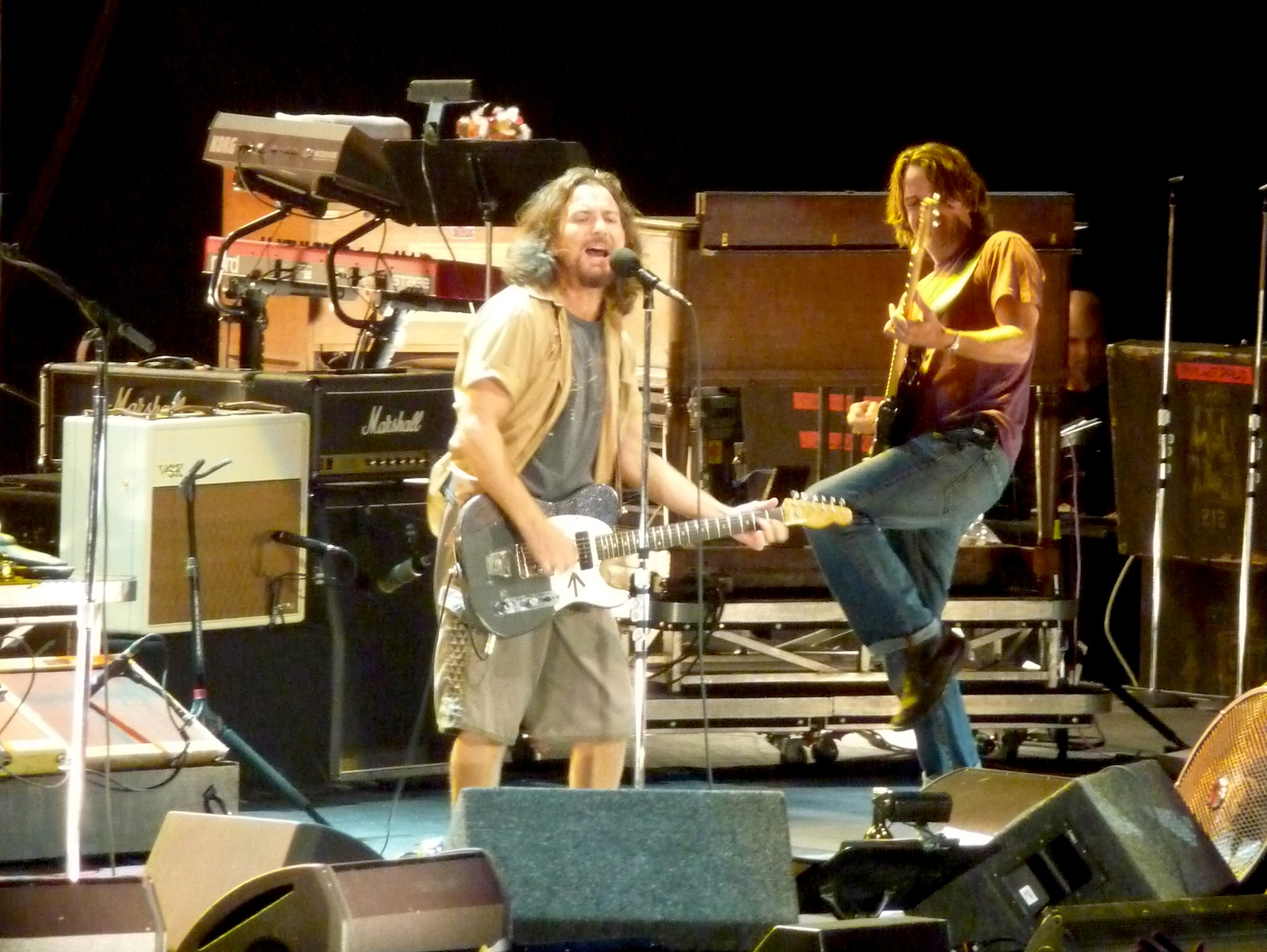
Pearl Jam was an influence on These Days.

Hard rock and pop metal had declined by the mid-1990s, while alternative rock and grunge were at the height of their popularity. Many of Bon Jovi's peers, such as Mötley Crüe and Warrant, tried adapting to the genres, but to little success. So, the band took a different approach. According to Jon Bon Jovi, the album was influenced by alternative bands, such as Pearl Jam, Tool, and Nine Inch Nails, but this is reflected more in the introspective lyrics than the music. Daina Darzin of Rolling Stone wrote that Bon Jovi retains their "cheesy-but-irresistible pop qualities" from the 1980s, but incorporates them in the form of "mostly sad music for grown-ups." She also compared These Days to the music of Bruce Springsteen, Garth Brooks and ZZ Top.

These Days is primarily an adult contemporary rock album, with pop rock ballads and elements of soul, R&B and modern rock. "This Ain't a Love Song", "Hearts Breaking Even" and "Damned" are bouncy R&B songs, the latter even featuring a horn section inspired by fellow New Jersey rock band, Southside Johnny and the Asbury Jukes. Daina Darzin also described the song as "the record’s most rollicking, guitar-solohappy cut", but still has more in common with INXS than Mötley Crüe. The opening track, "Hey God", is one of the band's heaviest, with a hard rock and alternative rock sound that exemplifies Sambora's love of blues.

Jon Bon Jovi is credited with composing the music for all of the album's tracks. Richie Sambora is also credited with composing the music for all of the album's tracks, except "(It's Hard) Letting You Go" and "Something To Believe In"; both were written and composed by Jon Bon Jovi. He is also not credited on "Hearts Breaking Even", which was written and composed by Jon Bon Jovi and Desmond Child. Desmond is also credited with composing "Something For The Pain", "This Ain't A Love Song" and "Diamond Ring". All of the other tracks were written by Jon Bon Jovi and Richie Sambora.

=== Lyrics ===
Jon Bon Jovi stated that even though the album was their darkest, the band was in a very happy place at the time. "Hey God" was written by Jon Bon Jovi and Richie Sambora in Jon Bon Jovi's basement. Richie Sambora said that his inspiration for the song came when he was sitting in his limo and made eye contact with a derelict huddling in a cardboard box on the pavement. His sense of guilt at this was immense and discussed the incident with Jon Bon Jovi, who was inspired by the view out of the window from 57th St. and Broadway in New York, where a man wearing an Armani suit was next to a man who's sleeping on the street. "Something For The Pain" was the most difficult to write, says Jon Bon Jovi. They kept rewriting until the chorus made sense.

"My Guitar Lies Bleeding In My Arms" was written from a writing session where they were hit with writer's block. Taking a cue from the opening line of "Bed of Roses" ("Sitting here wasted and wounded at this old piano, Trying hard to capture the moment"), Jon Bon Jovi instead of putting the pen down, wrote about his experience. "Damned" is about a guy who is involved with a married woman. "(It's Hard) Letting You Go" was written by Jon Bon Jovi for the movie called Moonlight and Valentino in which he appeared. "Something To Believe In" is an introspective song about a man questioning everything around him. Richie Sambora's "Hey, hey, hey" chant on the song is lifted from the demo. It worked so well, they kept it and used it on the album. "Diamond Ring" was originally written for the album New Jersey in 1988 and was played live six times during the New Jersey Syndicate Tour, but never made it onto any previous Bon Jovi album.

== Release and reception ==
Professional ratings
Review scores
Source	Rating
AllMusic	3/5 stars
Entertainment Weekly	D
NME	4/10
Q	5/5 stars
Rolling Stone	3/5 stars
The Rolling Stone Album Guide	3.5/5 stars

Two titles that were considered were "Open All Night" and "Strip" but ultimately, the band wanted to make a statement about the themes of the record. Mark Selliger shot the album cover in Mexico.

The two extra songs "All I Want Is Everything" and "Bitter Wine" appear as bonus tracks on the international versions. Released June 12 in Japan, June 19 in Europe and June 27 in the rest of the world, the album was an immediate success. It even replaced Michael Jackson's HIStory in the UK, debuting at number one, spending four weeks at number one. These Days also topped the charts in several other European countries, including Germany, Austria, Switzerland, the Netherlands, Ireland, Finland, and Portugal and spending seven weeks on Billboard European Albums Chart. It was certified triple platinum by the International Federation of the Phonographic Industry for selling 3 million copies across Europe.

In Australia, it debuted at number one and spent two weeks at number one on the ARIA Charts. The album became Bon Jovi's second number one album in Japan, where it debuted at number one on the Oricon chart, selling over 379,000, becoming the fastest selling album by a non-Japanese act in history of the country's chart. The album has sold more than 1 million copies and certified five times platinum and became the band's best selling studio album in Japan.

These Days received favorable reviews from critics. Q magazine, in a perfect score, said that Cross Road and Always confirmed that Bon Jovi would survive grunge and These Days consolidated their status by keeping Michael Jackson's HIStory album off the UK number 1 album slot. The review said that "Hey God", "Lie to Me" and "Something to Believe In" were singled out as the album's highlights and the album was arguably the band's finest musical hour to date. Stephen Thomas Erlewine of AllMusic concluded that "as the years go by, Bon Jovi gets musically stronger. Not only are their best songs stronger now, their playing is more accomplished. Keeping these improvements in mind, it's no surprise that the group was one of the few pop-metal bands to sustain a career in the mid-'90s". The album was ranked number two on Q magazine's list of the "Top 50 albums of 1995", beat out by The Great Escape of the British band Blur. The album was mentioned as the second best album of 1995, after (What's The Story) Morning Glory? by Oasis according to some critics.

In the United Kingdom, the album was particularly notable for producing four Top 10 hit singles, and the UK Rock & Metal had 4 singles in the #1 top singles with "This Ain't A Love Song," "Something For The Pain," "These Days," and "Hey God," but failed to impress the audience and the critics in the United States. The album peaked at number nine on the Billboard 200.

== Track listing ==
All tracks are written by Jon Bon Jovi and Richie Sambora, except where noted.

International edition
No.	Title	Writer(s)	Length
1.	"Hey God"		6:03
2.	"Something for the Pain"	Bon Jovi; Sambora; Desmond Child	4:46
3.	"This Ain't a Love Song"	Bon Jovi; Sambora; Child	5:06
4.	"These Days"		6:26
5.	"Lie to Me"		5:34
6.	"Damned"		4:35
7.	"My Guitar Lies Bleeding in My Arms"		5:42
8.	"(It's Hard) Letting You Go"	Bon Jovi	5:50
9.	"Hearts Breaking Even"	Bon Jovi; Child	5:05
10.	"Something to Believe In"	Bon Jovi	5:25
11.	"If That's What It Takes"		5:17
12.	"Diamond Ring"	Bon Jovi; Sambora; Child	3:46
13.	"All I Want Is Everything" (European bonus track)		5:18
14.	"Bitter Wine" (European bonus track)		4:36
Total length:			63:55

Alternate Track 14 for some Latin American releases
No.	Title	Writer(s)	Length
14.	"Como yo nadie te ha amado" (Spanish version of "This Ain't a Love Song")	Bon Jovi; Sambora; Child

European 2 Disc Special Edition bonus disc
No.	Title	Writer(s)	Length
1.	"Fields of Fire" (Demo)	Bon Jovi	4:10
2.	"I Thank You" (Sam & Dave cover)	Isaac Hayes; David Porter	3:14
3.	"Mrs. Robinson" (Simon & Garfunkel cover)	Paul Simon	3:21
4.	"Let's Make It Baby" (Demo)	Bon Jovi; Sambora; Child	6:19
5.	"I Don't Like Mondays" (Live at Wembley Stadium, featuring Bob Geldof)	Bob Geldof	5:59
6.	"Crazy" (Willie Nelson cover; live with lead vocals by Tico Torres)	Willie Nelson	3:29
7.	"Tumblin' Dice" (The Rolling Stones cover; live with lead vocals by David Bryan)	Jagger–Richards	4:17
8.	"Heaven Help Us All" (Stevie Wonder cover; live with lead vocals by Richie Sambora)	Ron Miller	4:34

French bonus disc
No.	Title	Writer(s)	Length
1.	"Always" (Live in Montreal)		5:52
2.	"Good Guys Don't Always Wear White"		4:27
3.	"Prostitute"		4:28
4.	"Lonely at the Top"		4:14
5.	"When She Comes"		3:29
6.	"The End"	Bon Jovi; Sambora; Bryan	3:38

Australian Tour Edition bonus disc: Live at Wembley Stadium, London (Mercury 528 874-2)
No.	Title	Writer(s)	Length
1.	"This Ain't a Love Song"	Bon Jovi; Sambora; Child	6:27
2.	"I Don't Like Mondays"	Geldof	5:57
3.	"Livin' on a Prayer"	Bon Jovi; Sambora; Child	5:55
4.	"You Give Love a Bad Name"	Bon Jovi; Sambora; Child	3:40
5.	"Wild in the Streets"	Bon Jovi	5:00

1996 Japan Hardback Cover 2CD – Karaoke Days (bonus CD)
No.	Title	Writer(s)	Length
1.	"Keep the Faith"	Bon Jovi; Sambora; Child	5:08
2.	"Bed of Roses"	Bon Jovi	6:38
3.	"Someday I'll Be Saturday Night"	Bon Jovi; Sambora; Child	4:43
4.	"In These Arms"	Bon Jovi; Sambora; Bryan	4:30

1998 Japan Special Edition bonus CD PHCR-90023/24
No.	Title	Writer(s)	Length
1.	"This Ain't a Love Song" (Wembley 1995)	Bon Jovi; Sambora; Child
2.	"Hey God" (Johannesburg 1995)
3.	"These Days" (Johannesburg 1995)
4.	"Something for the Pain" (Miami Arena 1995)	Bon Jovi; Sambora; Child
5.	"(It's Hard) Letting You Go" (Johannesburg 1995)	Bon Jovi
6.	"Rockin' in the Free World" (Neil Young cover; Johannesburg 1995)	Young
7.	"634-5789" (Studio outtake)
8.	"All I Want Is Everything"
9.	"Bitter Wine"

2010 Special Edition bonus tracks
No.	Title	Writer(s)	Length
13.	"This Ain't a Love Song" (Live)	Bon Jovi; Sambora; Child	7:13
14.	"Diamond Ring" (Live)	Bon Jovi; Sambora; Child	4:42

== Personnel ==
Personnel taken from These Days liner notes.

Bon Jovi

- Jon Bon Jovi – lead and backing vocals, percussion, harmonica, producer
- Richie Sambora – acoustic & electric guitar, electric sitar, background vocals, producer
- David Bryan – keyboards, background vocals
- Tico Torres – drums, percussion

Additional musicians

- Hugh McDonald – bass
- Randy Jackson - bass on “Hearts Breaking Even”
- David Campbell – string arrangements
- Richie LaBamba – trombone
- Jerry Vivino – tenor saxophone
- Mark Pender – trumpet
- Ed Manion – baritone saxophone
- Tommy Funderburk, Rory Dodd – additional background vocals
- Suzie Katayama – accordion
- Jerry Cohen – additional keyboards
- Robbie Buchanan – keyboards, programming

Production staff

- Peter Collins – producer
- Nathaniel Kunkel, Jay Schwartz, David Thoener, Gabe Veltry – engineer
- Mark Apringer, Ryan Freeland, Jim Labinski, Chris Laidlaw, Manny Lecouna, Pete Martinez, Mark Mason, Tal Miller, Mike Scotella, Mark Springer – assistant engineer
- Margery Greenspan – art direction, artwork
- Frank Harkins – design
- Cynthia Levine – photography
- George Marino – mastering, remastering
- Mark Selinger – photography

== Charts ==
=== Weekly charts ===
Chart (1995–1996)	Peak position
Argentine Albums (CAPIF)	3
Australian Albums (ARIA)	1
Austrian Albums (Ö3 Austria)	1
Belgian Albums (Ultratop Flanders)	3
Belgian Albums (Ultratop Wallonia)	6
Canada Top Albums/CDs (RPM)	1
Chilean Albums (IFPI)	5
Danish Albums (Hitlisten)	5
Dutch Albums (Album Top 100)	1
Estonian Albums (Eesti Top 10)	2
European Albums (Billboard)	1
Finnish Albums (Suomen virallinen lista)	1
French Albums (SNEP)	7
German Albums (Offizielle Top 100)	1
Hungarian Albums (MAHASZ)	2
Icelandic Albums (Tonlist)	19
Irish Albums (IRMA)	1
Italian Albums (FIMI)	3
Japanese Albums (Oricon)	1
New Zealand Albums (RMNZ)	11
Norwegian Albums (VG-lista)	7
Portuguese Albums (AFP)	1
Scottish Albums (Official Charts)	1
Spanish Albums (AFYVE)	3
Swedish Albums (Sverigetopplistan)	2
Swiss Albums (Schweizer Hitparade)	1
UK Albums (Official Charts)	1
UK Rock & Metal Albums (Official Charts)	1
US Billboard 200	9

=== Year-end charts ===
Chart (1995)	Position
Australian Albums (ARIA)	22
Austrian Albums (Ö3 Austria)	8
Belgian Albums (Ultratop Flanders)	22
Belgian Albums (Ultratop Wallonia)	56
Canada Top Albums/CDs (RPM)	36
Dutch Albums (Album Top 100)	17
French Albums (SNEP)	49
German Albums (Offizielle Top 100)	13
Japanese Albums (Oricon)	25
Swiss Albums (Schweizer Hitparade)	20
UK Albums (OCC)	22
US Billboard 200	144

Chart (1996)	Position
Dutch Albums (Album Top 100)	63
German Albums (Offizielle Top 100)	31
UK Albums (OCC)	82

== Certifications ==
Region	Certification	Certified units/sales
Australia (ARIA)	Platinum	70,000^{^}
Austria (IFPI Austria)	Platinum	50,000^{*}
Belgium (BRMA)	Gold	25,000^{*}
Canada (Music Canada)	2× Platinum	200,000^{^}
Finland (Musiikkituottajat)	Platinum	64,725
France (SNEP)	2× Gold	200,000^{*}
Germany (BVMI)	Gold	250,000^{^}
Japan (RIAJ)	Million	1,200,000
Netherlands (NVPI)	Platinum	100,000^{^}
New Zealand (RMNZ)	Gold	7,500^{^}
Spain (Promusicae)	2× Platinum	200,000^{^}
Switzerland (IFPI Switzerland)	Platinum	50,000^{^}
United Kingdom (BPI)	2× Platinum	600,000^{^}
United States (RIAA)	Platinum	1,000,000^{^}
Summaries
Europe (IFPI)	3× Platinum	3,000,000^{*}
Worldwide	—	10,000,000
^{*} Sales figures based on certification alone.^{^} Shipments figures based on certification alone.
