= Cross Road (album) =

Greatest hits album by Bon Jovi
- Released: October 11, 1994
- Recorded: 1982–94
- Studios: Little Mountain (Vancouver); Emerald (Nashville); A&M (Hollywood); The Warehouse (Philadelphia); Power Station (New York City)
- Genres: Pop metal; hard rock
- Length: 76:42
- Labels: Mercury; PolyGram
- Producers: Tony Bongiovi; Jon Bon Jovi; Richie Sambora; Bruce Fairbairn; Bob Rock; Peter Collins; Danny Kortchmar; Lance Quinn

Bon Jovi chronology
Keep the Faith (1992)	Cross Road (1994)	These Days (1995)

Singles from Cross Road
- 1. "Always" Released: September 12, 1994; 2. "Someday I'll Be Saturday Night" Released: February 5, 1995

Professional ratings
Review scores
Source	Rating
AllMusic	4.5/5 stars
Music Week	5/5 stars
NME	7/10
Q	5/5 stars
The Rolling Stone Album Guide	4/5 stars

Cross Road is the first official greatest hits album by American rock band Bon Jovi, released on October 11, 1994, by Mercury Records. The album contains hits from all previously released albums from their debut, Bon Jovi (1984) to Keep the Faith (1992). The album includes two new tracks: the hit singles "Always" and "Someday I'll Be Saturday Night", as well as "Prayer '94", a new version of "Livin' on a Prayer" only on the North American versions. "Runaway" was never recorded with the current band, though at that time there were plans to put a "Runaway '94" on the album but it was never recorded. The diner located on the cover of the album is the Roadside Diner in Wall Township, New Jersey, near the crossroads of Route 33 and Route 34.

The album's first single "Always" went top five in many countries. It spent six months in the top 10 of the Billboard Hot 100 and became Bon Jovi's biggest selling single in the United States. Its international success helped the album to peak at number one in 13 countries and made it Polygram Records' best-selling album of 1994. It is Bon Jovi's best selling album in many countries. It has sold over 21.5 million copies worldwide, making it one of the best-selling albums of all time.

In 2005, Cross Road was re-issued as a 3-disc box set under the name "Deluxe Sound & Vision", which included the original remastered album, a bonus CD containing B-sides, rarities and fan favorites, and the Live from London DVD. The original remastered album was released in 1998. A video, also entitled Cross Road, was simultaneously released, containing 16 of the band's music videos.

== Release and reception ==
In the United States, the album debuted and peaked at number 8 on the Billboard 200 the week of November 5, 1994 The album was certified 7× platinum by the Recording Industry Association of America (RIAA) in 2024, ten years after release, and has sold over seven million copies in the United States.

In the United Kingdom, Cross Road debuted at number one on the UK Albums Chart and spent a total of five non-consecutive weeks atop the chart, later becoming the best-selling album of 1994. The album was certified 6× platinum by the BPI. The album topped the charts in several other European countries, including Austria, Denmark, Germany, Italy, Portugal, and Switzerland. In 2007, it was certified 8× platinum by the International Federation of the Phonographic Industry for selling 8 million copies across Europe.

The album became Bon Jovi's first number-one set in Japan, where it has sold more than 1.1 million copies. It spent two weeks at number one in Australia and in 2022 it was certified 13× platinum by the Australian Recording Industry Association for shipments exceeding 910,000 copies. The album debuted at number three on the New Zealand Albums Chart, peaking at number one in its second week and later being certified 6× platinum by the Recording Industry Association of New Zealand.

The album won Metal Edge's 1994 Readers' Choice Awards for "Album of the Year" and "Best Hits or Compilation Album". Its namesake home video was voted "Best Video Cassette," and the single "Always" was voted "Song of the Year" and "Best Video Clip".

== Track listing ==
International edition
No.	Title	Writer(s)	From album	Length
1.	"Livin' on a Prayer"	Jon Bon Jovi; Richie Sambora; Desmond Child	Slippery When Wet (1986)	4:11
2.	"Keep the Faith"	Bon Jovi; Sambora; Child	Keep the Faith (1992)	5:45
3.	"Someday I'll Be Saturday Night"	Bon Jovi; Sambora; Child	New song	4:38
4.	"Always"	Bon Jovi	New song	5:52
5.	"Wanted Dead or Alive"	Bon Jovi; Sambora	Slippery When Wet	5:07
6.	"Lay Your Hands on Me"	Bon Jovi; Sambora	New Jersey (1988)	5:58
7.	"You Give Love a Bad Name"	Bon Jovi; Sambora; Child	Slippery When Wet	3:43
8.	"Bed of Roses"	Bon Jovi	Keep the Faith	6:34
9.	"Blaze of Glory" (Jon Bon Jovi solo)	Bon Jovi	Blaze of Glory (1990)	5:40
10.	"In These Arms"	Bon Jovi; Sambora; David Bryan	Keep the Faith	5:16
11.	"Bad Medicine"	Bon Jovi; Sambora; Child	New Jersey	5:14
12.	"I'll Be There for You"	Bon Jovi; Sambora	New Jersey	5:41
13.	"In and Out of Love"	Bon Jovi	7800° Fahrenheit (1985)	4:23
14.	"Runaway"	Bon Jovi; George Karak	Bon Jovi (1984)	3:50
15.	"Never Say Goodbye" (European bonus track)	Bon Jovi; Sambora	Slippery When Wet	4:50
Total length:				76:42

US edition
No.	Title	Writer(s)	From album	Length
10.	"Prayer '94"	Bon Jovi; Sambora; Child	Re-recording of "Livin' on a Prayer"	5:16

== Personnel ==
Credits adapted from Cross Road's liner notes.

Bon Jovi

- Jon Bon Jovi – lead vocals, acoustic rhythm guitar, additional guitars
- Richie Sambora – lead guitars, backing vocals
- David Bryan – keyboards, backing vocals
- Alec John Such – bass, backing vocals
- Tico Torres – drums, percussion

Additional musicians

- Hugh McDonald – bass, backing vocals
- Kenny Aronoff – drums and percussion on "Blaze of Glory"
- Jeff Beck – lead and slide guitars on "Blaze of Glory"
- Peter Berring – background vocals arrangements
- Roy Bittan – keyboards on "Runaway"
- Carole Brooks – background vocals on "In and Out of Love"
- Jeanie Brooks – background vocals on "In and Out of Love"
- Joanie Bye – background vocals
- Randy Cantor – synthesizer programming (credited as "synth programs") on "In and Out of Love"
- Lovena Fox – background vocals
- David Grahamme – background vocals on "Runaway"
- Phil Hoffer – background vocals on "In and Out of Love"
- Linda Hunt – background vocals
- Michael Kamen – strings orchestration, arrangement and conduction
- Randy Jackson – bass on "Blaze of Glory"
- Frankie La Rocka – drums on "Runaway"
- Cecille Larochelle – background vocals
- Sue Leonard – background vocals
- Tommy Mandel – synthesizers on "In and Out of Love"
- Myna Matthews – background vocals
- Guoudin Morris – percussion
- Aldo Nova – electric guitars, acoustic guitars, keyboards
- Tim Pierce – guitar on "Runaway"
- Jim Salamone – synthesizer programming (credited as "lynn programs") on "In and Out of Love"
- Mick Seeley – background vocals on "Runaway"
- Joanie Taylor – background vocals
- Benmont Tench – organ on "Blaze of Glory"
- Rick Valenti – background vocals on "In and Out of Love"
- Oren Waters – background vocals
- Julia Waters – background vocals
- Maxine Waters – background vocals
- John Webster – keyboards

Production credits

- Bruce Fairbairn – producer
- Bob Rock – engineer, mixing, producer
- Tim Crich – assistant
- Randy Staub – engineer, mixing
- Obie O'Brien – engineer, additional recording
- Peter Collins – producer
- Kevin Shirley – engineer
- Bob Clearmountain – mixing
- Chris Taylor – assistant
- Danny Kortchmar – producer
- Jon Bon Jovi – producer
- Rob Jacobs – recording, mixing
- Brian "Mutt" Scheuble – recording, mixing
- Chad Musey – assistant
- Greg Goldman – assistant
- Rick Plank – assistant
- Richie Sambora – producer
- Lance Quinn – producer ("Runaway" and "In and Out of Love")
- David Thoener – mixing ("In and Out of Love")
- Fernando Kral – assistant
- Larry Alexander – engineer ("Runaway" and "In and Out of Love")
- Mal – engineer
- Bill Scheniman – engineer ("In and Out of Love")
- John Cianci – assistant ("In and Out of Love")
- Big Al Greaves – assistant
- Tony Bongiovi – producer ("Runaway")
- Arthur Mann – executive producer ("Runaway")
- Scott Litt – engineer
- Jeff Henderickson – engineer ("Runaway")
- John Babich – assistant
- Gary Rindfuss – assistant
- Bruce Lampcov – assistant
- Dave Greenberg – assistant
- Barry Bongiovi – assistant
- George Marino – mastering, remastering, digital remastering
- Dave Collins – mastering
- Greg Calbi – mastering ("In and Out of Love")
- John Kalodner – A&R co-ordination
- Anton Corbijn – photography
- Mark Wiess – additional photography
- Margery Greenspan – art direction
- Lili Picou – design

== Charts ==
=== Weekly charts ===
Weekly chart performance for Cross Road
Chart (1994–2007)	Peak position
Australian Albums (ARIA)	1
Austrian Albums (Ö3 Austria)	1
Belgian Albums (Ultratop Flanders)	14
Belgian Albums (Ultratop Wallonia)	14
Canada Top Albums/CDs (RPM)	1
Chilean Albums (IFPI)	2
Danish Albums (Nielsen Marketing Research)	1
Dutch Albums (Album Top 100)	2
Estonian Albums (Eesti Top 10)	1
European Albums (Music & Media)	1
Finnish Albums (Seura)	1
French Compilations (SNEP)	3
German Albums (Offizielle Top 100)	1
Hungarian Albums Chart	4
Irish Albums (IFPI)	2
Italian Albums (Musica e dischi)	1
Japanese Albums (Dempa Publications, Inc)	1
New Zealand Albums (RMNZ)	1
Norwegian Albums (VG-lista)	2
Portuguese Albums (AFP)	1
Scottish Albums (Official Charts)	1
Spanish Albums (AFYVE)	2
Swedish Albums (Sverigetopplistan)	2
Swiss Albums (Schweizer Hitparade)	1
UK Albums (Official Charts)	1
UK Rock & Metal Albums (Official Charts)	1
US Billboard 200	8
US Top Catalog Albums (Billboard)	1
US Top Hard Rock Albums (Billboard)	7

=== Year-end charts ===
Year-end chart performance for Cross Road
Chart (1994)	Position
Australian Albums (ARIA)	3
Austrian Albums (Ö3 Austria)	17
Canadian Albums (RPM)	29
Dutch Albums (Album Top 100)	9
German Albums (Offizielle Top 100)	21
Japanese Albums (Oricon)	28
New Zealand Albums (RMNZ)	37
Swiss Albums (Schweizer Hitparade)	47
UK Albums (OCC)	1

Chart (1995)	Position
Australian Albums (ARIA)	26
Austrian Albums (Ö3 Austria)	8
Belgian Albums (Ultratop Flanders)	30
Belgian Albums (Ultratop Wallonia)	22
Dutch Albums (Album Top 100)	15
Europe (European Top 100 Albums)	3
German Albums (Offizielle Top 100)	11
Japanese Albums (Oricon)	31
Swiss Albums (Schweizer Hitparade)	11
UK Albums (OCC)	38
US Billboard 200	41

Chart (2002)	Position
Canadian Metal Albums (Nielsen SoundScan)	40

Chart (2006)	Position
UK Albums (OCC)	189

Chart (2007)	Position
UK Albums (OCC)	158

Chart (2008)	Position
UK Albums (OCC)	175

Chart (2009)	Position
UK Albums (OCC)	156

=== Decade-end charts ===
Decade-end chart performance for Cross Road
Chart (1990s)	Position
Austrian Albums Chart	9

== Certifications and sales ==
Certifications and sales for Cross Road
Region	Certification	Certified units/sales
Argentina (CAPIF)	4× Platinum	240,000^{^}
Australia (ARIA)	13× Platinum	910,000^{‡}
Austria (IFPI Austria)	3× Platinum	150,000^{*}
Belgium (BRMA)	2× Platinum	100,000^{*}
Brazil (Pro-Música Brasil)	Platinum	320,000
Canada (Music Canada)	Diamond	1,000,000^{^}
Chile	Platinum	25,000
Czech Republic	Platinum	50,000
Denmark (IFPI Danmark)	3× Platinum	150,000^{^}
Finland (Musiikkituottajat)	2× Platinum	123,354
France (SNEP)	Platinum	300,000^{*}
Germany (BVMI)	2× Platinum	1,000,000^{^}
Hong Kong (IFPI Hong Kong)	3× Platinum	60,000^{*}
Hungary (MAHASZ)	Gold	
India	Gold	10,000
Indonesia	5× Platinum	250,000
Ireland (IRMA)	3× Platinum	45,000^{^}
Italy (FIMI)	5× Platinum	500,000^{*}
Japan (RIAJ)	Million	1,150,000
Malaysia	4× Platinum	100,000
Mexico (AMPROFON)	2× Platinum	500,000^{^}
Netherlands (NVPI)	2× Platinum	200,000^{^}
New Zealand (RMNZ)	7× Platinum	105,000^{^}
Norway (IFPI Norway)	2× Platinum	100,000^{*}
Philippines (PARI)	3× Platinum	90,000
Poland (ZPAV)	Gold	50,000^{*}
Portugal (AFP)	3× Platinum	120,000^{^}
Singapore (RIAS)	4× Platinum	60,000
South Africa (RISA)	2× Platinum	100,000^{*}
South Korea (KMCA)	2× Platinum	60,000
Spain (Promusicae)	4× Platinum	400,000^{^}
Sweden (GLF)	Platinum	100,000^{^}
Switzerland (IFPI Switzerland)	3× Platinum	150,000^{^}
Taiwan (RIT)	6× Platinum	300,000
Thailand	Platinum	50,000
United Kingdom (BPI)	6× Platinum	1,867,427
United States (RIAA)	7× Platinum	7,000,000^{‡}
United States (RIAA) video	Gold	50,000^{^}
Summaries
Europe (IFPI)	8× Platinum	8,000,000^{*}
Worldwide	—	21,000,000
^{*} Sales figures based on certification alone.^{^} Shipments figures based on certification alone.^{‡} Sales+streaming figures based on certification alone.

== See also ==
- Cross Road (videos)
- List of best-selling albums in Australia
- List of best-selling albums
- List of diamond-certified albums in Canada
