= Something for the Pain =

1995 single by Bon Jovi

Single by Bon Jovi

from the album These Days
- A-side: "Lie to Me" (US only)
- B-side: "Wild in the Streets" (live); "634-5789"
- Released: September 5, 1995
- Length: 4:48
- Label: Mercury
- Songwriters: Jon Bon Jovi; Richie Sambora; Desmond Child
- Producers: Peter Collins; Jon Bon Jovi; Richie Sambora

Bon Jovi singles chronology
"This Ain't a Love Song" (1995)	"Something for the Pain" (1995)	"Lie to Me" (1995)

Music video
- "Something for the Pain" on YouTube

"Something for the Pain" is a song by American rock band Bon Jovi. It was released on September 5, 1995, by Mercury Records as the second single from their sixth studio album, These Days (1995). It is written by Jon Bon Jovi, Richie Sambora and Desmond Child, and produced by Bon Jovi, Sambora and Peter Collins. The song charted at number 15 in Canada, number eight on the UK Singles Chart, and number four in Finland. In the United States, it was released as a double A-side with "Lie to Me" and peaked at number 76 on the Billboard Hot 100.

== Critical reception ==
Helen Lamont from Smash Hits gave the song two out of five, writing, "Hands up if you've been complaing about Bon Jovi playing too many "rock" ballads of late? Well, the Jovi have returned to their roots. Or at least they've tried. 'Something for the Pain' is just a fairly unremarkable rock song with nothing to commend it other than that it's by Bon Jovi. Not so much 'Livin' on a Prayer', then, as 'Living on a Past Reputation'."

== Music video ==
The music video for the song was released in 1995 and directed by Marty Callner. It shows a young man walking into a Virgin music store and heading to listen to some sample music. On the screen, it shows the band playing with other cast members singing the song in different scenarios. In the video are actors impersonating Eddie Vedder, Snoop Dogg, Dr. Dre, Courtney Love, and Scott Weiland, who also sing along to the song. The teenager enjoys the video when Bon Jovi appears, but expresses disdain when seeing the other artists. It ends with the teenager stealing a copy of These Days.

== Track listings ==
- US CD, 7-inch, and cassette single (with "Lie to Me")
1. "Something for the Pain" (edit) – 3:57
2. "Lie to Me" – 5:33
- US maxi-CD single (with "Lie to Me")
1. "Something for the Pain" – 4:46
2. "Lie to Me" – 5:33
3. "Wild in the Streets" (live) – 5:01
4. "634-5789" – 3:08
- UK CD1
1. "Something for the Pain" – 4:46
2. "This Ain't a Love Song" (live) – 6:27
3. "I Don't Like Mondays" (featuring Bob Geldof—live) – 5:58
- UK CD2
1. "Something for the Pain" – 4:46
2. "Livin' on a Prayer" (live) – 5:56
3. "You Give Love a Bad Name" (live) – 3:40
4. "Wild in the Streets" (live) – 5:01
- UK cassette single and European CD single
1. "Something for the Pain" (LP version) – 4:46
2. "This Ain't a Love Song" (live) – 6:27
- Australian CD single
1. "Something for the Pain" (LP version) – 4:46
2. "This Ain't a Love Song" (live) – 6:27
3. "You Give Love a Bad Name" (live) – 3:40
4. "Wild in the Streets" (live) – 5:01
- Australian limited-edition CD single
1. "Something for the Pain" (LP version) – 4:46
2. "This Ain't a Love Song" (live) – 6:27
3. "I Don't Like Mondays" (featuring Bob Geldof—live) – 5:58
4. "Livin' on a Prayer" (live) – 5:56
- Japanese CD single
1. "Something for the Pain" (LP version) – 4:46
2. "This Ain't a Love Song" (live) – 6:26
3. "You Give Love a Bad Name" (live) – 3:51
4. "Wild in the Streets" – 4:59
5. "Como yo nadie te ha amado" (hidden track)
- Japanese mini-CD single
1. "Something for the Pain" (LP version)
2. "Livin' on a Prayer" (live)
3. "I Don't Like Mondays" (live)

== Charts ==
=== Weekly charts ===
Chart (1995)	Peak position
Australia (ARIA)	14
Austria (Ö3 Austria Top 40)	36
Belgium (Ultratop 50 Flanders)	37
Belgium (Ultratop 50 Wallonia)	31
Canada Top Singles (RPM)	15
Europe (Eurochart Hot 100)	10
Europe (European Hit Radio)	7
Finland (Suomen virallinen lista)	4
Germany (GfK)	51
Iceland (Íslenski Listinn Topp 40)	18
Ireland (IRMA)	8
Israel (Israeli Singles Chart)	20
Netherlands (Dutch Top 40)	18
Netherlands (Single Top 100)	14
New Zealand (Recorded Music NZ)	16
Scottish Singles Sales (Official Charts)	9
Sweden (Sverigetopplistan)	33
Switzerland (Schweizer Hitparade)	10
UK Singles (Official Charts)	8
UK Rock & Metal (Official Charts)	1
US Billboard Hot 100 with "Lie to Me"	76
US Pop Airplay (Billboard)	39
US Cash Box Top 100	60

=== Year-end charts ===
Chart (1995)	Position
Europe (Eurochart Hot 100)	86
UK Airplay (Music Week)	43

== Certifications ==
Region	Certification	Certified units/sales
Australia (ARIA)	Gold	35,000^{‡}
^{‡} Sales+streaming figures based on certification alone.

== Release history ==
Region	Date	Format(s)	Label(s)	Ref(s).
United States	September 5, 1995	CD	Mercury	
United Kingdom	September 11, 1995	CD; cassette	Mercury	
Australia	September 18, 1995	CD1; cassette	Mercury	
Japan	September 30, 1995	Maxi-CD	Mercury	
Japan	November 5, 1995	Mini-CD	Mercury	
Australia	November 6, 1995	CD2	Mercury	
