= This Ain't a Love Song =

1995 single by Bon Jovi

Single by Bon Jovi

from the album These Days
- B-side: 1. "Always" (live); 2. "Prostitute" (demo); 3. "When She Comes" (demo); 4. "The End" (demo); 5. "Lonely at the Top" (demo)
- Released: May 23, 1995
- Genre: Rock; R&B
- Length: 5:08
- Label: Mercury
- Songwriters: Jon Bon Jovi; Richie Sambora; Desmond Child
- Producers: Peter Collins; Jon Bon Jovi; Richie Sambora

Bon Jovi singles chronology
"Someday I'll Be Saturday Night" (1994)	"This Ain't a Love Song" (1995)	"Something for the Pain" (1995)

Music video
- "This Ain't a Love Song" on YouTube

"This Ain't a Love Song" is the lead single from American rock band Bon Jovi's sixth studio album, These Days (1995). The rock ballad is an example of the strong rhythm and blues influence that Jon Bon Jovi and Richie Sambora wanted the album to have. Released in May 1995 by Mercury Records, the song reached number 14 on the US Billboard Hot 100, number six on the UK Singles Chart, number two on the Canadian RPM 100 Hit Tracks chart, and number one on the Finnish Singles Chart. The music video for the song was directed by Andy Morahan and filmed in Thailand.

== Background and release ==
The song was written by Jon Bon Jovi, Richie Sambora and Desmond Child, and produced by Bon Jovi with Sambora and Peter Collins. The singer explained in a 1995 interview that "'This Ain't a Love Song' is pretty rootsy for us. It's R&B-influenced. I'm real proud of the way it turned out. It's been a big surprise, not only as a hit single but as a live song."

== Critical reception ==
James Masterton wrote in his weekly UK chart commentary, "The new single is another ballad although rather more understated and reflective than many they have produced in the past." Chris Marlowe from Music & Media felt it proved that "the group's great melodies and Jon Bon Jovi's double whammy of voice and sex appeal were stronger than ever." He added, "You can almost imagine what it would sound like with Wilson Pickett singing it". Simon Williams from NME commented, "And hey, guess what? 'This Ain't a Love Song' actually is a love song!" Another NME editor, Stephen Dalton, wrote that it "waltzes and croaks" like 'Bed of Roses'. Tony Cross from Smash Hits gave it two out of five, saying, "Yes it is. It's all about crying rivers and dying on a regular basis for some bird. Sounds more trouble than she's worth to me, fella. Get yourself a proper bird, cut out the slush like this and play her some of that brilliant guitar rock like you used to. That way she might not be so keen to off it."

== Music video ==
The accompanying music video for "This Ain't a Love Song" was shot at Wat Ratchaburana in Ayuthaya, Thailand, and directed by British commercial, film and music video director Andy Morahan.

== Spanish version ==
A Spanish version, "Como yo nadie te ha amado" ("Nobody Has Loved You Like I Do"), was also recorded. However, the lyrics in the two versions differ from each other; the original version talks about a lost love, which is never recovered, while the Spanish version is a reflection on love, about how no one will love someone with the same passion than the narrator.

Mexican singer Yuridia covered the Spanish version, "Como yo nadie te ha amado", on her second studio album Habla El Corazón which peaked at number 16 on the Billboard Hot Latin Tracks chart. Yuridia's cover received was nominated at the 2008 Latin Billboard Awards for Latin Pop Airplay of the Year by a Female Artist. Her cover also led to Jon Bon Jovi winning an ASCAP Latin Award in the Pop/Ballad field.

== Track listings ==
- US and Canadian CD single; US cassette single
1. "This Ain't a Love Song" – 5:06
2. "Always" (live at A&M Studios) – 4:45
3. "Prostitute" (demo) – 4:28
- US and Canadian maxi-CD single
1. "This Ain't a Love Song" – 5:06
2. "Prostitute" (demo) – 4:28
3. "When She Comes" (demo) – 3:29
4. "The End" (demo) – 3:39
5. "Lonely at the Top" (demo) – 4:14
- US 7-inch single and Japanese mini-CD single
1. "This Ain't a Love Song" – 5:06
2. "Always" (live at A&M Studios) – 4:45
- UK CD1
1. "This Ain't a Love Song" – 5:04
2. "Lonely at the Top" – 4:14
3. "The End" – 3:39
- UK CD2
1. "This Ain't a Love Song" – 5:04
2. "When She Comes" – 3:29
3. "Wedding Day" – 4:58
4. "Prostitute" – 4:28
- UK and Australian cassette single; European and Australian CD single
1. "This Ain't a Love Song" – 5:04
2. "Lonely at the Top" – 4:14
- European maxi-CD single
1. "This Ain't a Love Song" (album version) – 5:04
2. "Prostitute" – 4:28
3. "Lonely at the Top" – 4:14
4. "When She Comes" – 3:29
5. "The End" – 3:39
- French CD single
1. "This Ain't a Love Song" (album version) – 5:03
2. "Always" (album version) – 5:52
- Japanese maxi-CD single
1. "This Ain't a Love Song"
2. "Jon's Comment 1"
3. "Always" (live '94)
4. "Jon's Comment 2"
5. "Someday I'll Be Saturday Night" (live '94)
6. "Jon's Comment 3"
7. "With a Little Help from My Friends" (live '94)

== Charts ==
=== Weekly charts ===
Chart (1995)	Peak position
Australia (ARIA)	4
Austria (Ö3 Austria Top 40)	6
Belgium (Ultratop 50 Flanders)	11
Belgium (Ultratop 50 Wallonia)	8
Canada Top Singles (RPM)	2
Canada Adult Contemporary (RPM)	7
Chile (UPI)	8
El Salvador (UPI)	1
Europe (Eurochart Hot 100)	5
Europe (European Hit Radio)	1
Finland (Suomen virallinen lista)	1
France (SNEP)	8
Germany (GfK)	9
Hungary (Mahasz)	5
Iceland (Íslenski Listinn Topp 40)	3
Ireland (IRMA)	5
Israel (Israeli Singles Chart)	26
Italy (Musica e dischi)	10
Italy Airplay (Music & Media)	2
Japan (Oricon)	46
Mexico (Notitas Musicales)	1
Netherlands (Dutch Top 40)	3
Netherlands (Single Top 100)	3
New Zealand (Recorded Music NZ)	25
Norway (VG-lista)	8
Peru (UPI)	8
Poland Airplay (Music & Media)	1
Scottish Singles Sales (Official Charts)	7
Sweden (Sverigetopplistan)	12
Switzerland (Schweizer Hitparade)	4
UK Singles (Official Charts)	6
UK Rock & Metal (Official Charts)	1
US Billboard Hot 100	14
US Adult Contemporary (Billboard)	22
US Pop Airplay (Billboard)	11
US Cash Box Top 100	13
Venezuela (UPI)	3

=== Year-end charts ===
Chart (1995)	Position
Australia (ARIA)	67
Austria (Ö3 Austria Top 40)	31
Belgium (Ultratop 50 Flanders)	56
Belgium (Ultratop 50 Wallonia)	48
Canada Top Singles (RPM)	13
Canada Adult Contemporary (RPM)	54
Europe (Eurochart Hot 100)	41
Europe (European Hit Radio)	5
France (SNEP)	34
Germany (Media Control)	77
Iceland (Íslenski Listinn Topp 40)	24
Latvia (Latvijas Top 50)	27
Netherlands (Dutch Top 40)	46
Netherlands (Single Top 100)	53
Sweden (Topplistan)	78
Switzerland (Schweizer Hitparade)	21
UK Singles (OCC)	91
UK Airplay (Music Week)	44
US Billboard Hot 100	70

== Certifications ==
Region	Certification	Certified units/sales
Australia (ARIA)	Gold	35,000^{^}
^{^} Shipments figures based on certification alone.

== Release history ==
Region	Version	Date	Format(s)	Label(s)	Ref(s).
United States	"This Ain't a Love Song"	May 15, 1995	Contemporary hit; adult contemporary; hot adult contemporary radio	Mercury	
United States	"This Ain't a Love Song"	May 23, 1995	CD; cassette	Mercury	
Japan	"This Ain't a Love Song"	May 26, 1995	Maxi-CD; mini-CD	Mercury	
Australia	"This Ain't a Love Song"	June 5, 1995	CD; cassette	Mercury	
United States	"Como yo nadie te ha amado"	June 1995	Radio	Mercury	
