= Someday I'll Be Saturday Night =

1995 single by Bon Jovi

Single by Bon Jovi

from the album Cross Road
- Released: February 5, 1995
- Length: 4:39
- Label: Mercury
- Songwriters: Jon Bon Jovi; Richie Sambora; Desmond Child
- Producer: Peter Collins

Bon Jovi singles chronology
| "Please Come Home for Christmas" (1994) | "Someday I'll Be Saturday Night" (1995) | "This Ain't a Love Song" (1995) |

Music video
- "Someday I'll Be Saturday Night" on YouTube

"Someday I'll Be Saturday Night" is a song by American rock band Bon Jovi from their 1994 greatest hits album, Cross Road. It is written by band members Jon Bon Jovi and Richie Sambora with Desmond Child, and produced by Peter Collins. Released as a single by Mercury Records on February 5, 1995, the song reached number seven on the UK Singles Chart and became a top-10 hit in Australia, Finland, Iceland, and Ireland.

== Lyrical content ==
"Someday I'll Be Saturday Night" is about optimism in the face of adversity. The song's first verse introduces the characters Jim who struggles to find employment and is forced to sleep in his car, and Billie-Jean who was abused by her foster father and has turned to prostitution at the age of sixteen (remarking that the street-life ain't much better but at least I'm getting paid), mourning the loss of her childhood.

The song's pre-chorus and chorus refer to life, luck and survival, looking forward to when times are better (the eponymous Saturday Night). It is one of the few songs recorded by the band to feature explicit lyrics, though only as a single word.

== Critical reception ==
Tony Cross from Smash Hits gave "Someday I'll Be Saturday Night" three out of five, writing, "From the monumental Cross Road compilation comes something a little less rock and a lot more country. And, yes, Jon Bon Jovi, the coolest bloke in cowboy boots since Clint, turns this country-bumpkin of a strum-a-long into another success. He bawls out the chorus — about some berk's big-time aspirations — with such sincerity you can't help liking him all the more."

== Live performances ==
The song is considered to be a fan favourite and a popular example of Bon Jovi's upbeat anthemic choruses taking on deeper meaning during the 1990s. It is often performed live and has been refined in several different versions over the years. For example, there is a 1995 recording from Melbourne on the band's One Wild Night Live 1985–2001 live CD, where Jon Bon Jovi sings the intro slowly, encouraging the crowd to join in before the band come in and return the song to tempo. This version also features an extended interlude. On the Lost Highway Tour the song had been played in a version closer to the original studio recording, but for The Circle Tour, it is played in a slower acoustic style. The song was performed on select dates of the Because We Can Tour either in its slow acoustic arrangement, or in its original arrangement.

== B-side ==
The song "Good Guys Don't Always Wear White" is featured in the movie The Cowboy Way. Although Bon Jovi also released a music video to the song it was never released as a single. Aside from the "Someday I'll Be Saturday Night" single it can also be found on the Special Edition Bonus CD of the compilation Cross Road and the box set 100,000,000 Bon Jovi Fans Can't Be Wrong.

== Track listings ==
- Canadian maxi-CD single

UK CD1
Australian CD and cassette single

1. "Someday I'll Be Saturday Night" – 4:38
2. "Good Guys Don't Always Wear White" – 4:27
3. "With a Little Help from My Friends" (live) – 6:14
4. "Always" (live) – 5:52
- UK CD2
1. "Someday I'll Be Saturday Night"
2. "Good Guys Don't Always Wear White"
3. "Always" (live)
4. "Someday I'll Be Saturday Night" (live)
- UK 7-inch and cassette single

European CD single

1. "Someday I'll Be Saturday Night" – 4:38
2. "Always" (live) – 5:52
- Japanese CD single
1. "Someday I'll Be Saturday Night"
2. "Good Guys Don't Always Wear White"
3. "Prayer '94"
4. "Livin' on a Prayer" (live)

== Charts ==
=== Weekly charts ===
| Chart (1995) | Peak position |
|---|---|
| Australia (ARIA) | 10 |
| Belgium (Ultratop 50 Flanders) | 26 |
| Belgium (Ultratop 50 Wallonia) | 26 |
| Canada Top Singles (RPM) | 14 |
| Europe (Eurochart Hot 100) | 15 |
| Europe (European Hit Radio) | 4 |
| Finland (Suomen virallinen lista) | 4 |
| Germany (GfK) | 37 |
| Iceland (Íslenski Listinn Topp 40) | 10 |
| Ireland (IRMA) | 6 |
| Israel (Israeli Singles Chart) | 26 |
| Netherlands (Dutch Top 40) | 26 |
| Netherlands (Single Top 100) | 17 |
| New Zealand (Recorded Music NZ) | 45 |
| Norway (VG-lista) | 20 |
| Scottish Singles Sales (Official Charts) | 6 |
| Switzerland (Schweizer Hitparade) | 11 |
| UK Singles (Official Charts) | 7 |
| UK Rock & Metal (Official Charts) | 3 |
| UK Airplay (Music Week) | 2 |

=== Year-end charts ===
| Chart (1995) | Position |
|---|---|
| Belgium (Ultratop 50 Wallonia) | 95 |
| Iceland (Íslenski Listinn Topp 40) | 81 |
| UK Airplay (Music Week) | 31 |

== Release history ==
| Region | Date | Format(s) | Label(s) | Ref. |
|---|---|---|---|---|
| Japan | February 5, 1995 | CD | Mercury | |
| Australia | February 6, 1995 | CD; cassette | Mercury | |
| United Kingdom | February 13, 1995 | 7-inch vinyl; CD1; cassette | Mercury | |
| United Kingdom | February 20, 1995 | CD2 | Mercury | |
