= 634-5789 (Soulsville, U.S.A.) =

1966 single by Wilson Pickett

Single by Wilson Pickett

from the album The Exciting Wilson Pickett
- B-side: "That's a Man's Way"
- Released: January 1966
- Recorded: 1965
- Genre: R&B; soul
- Length: 2:55
- Label: Atlantic
- Songwriters: Steve Cropper, Eddie Floyd
- Producers: Jim Stewart; Steve Cropper

Wilson Pickett singles chronology
"Don't Fight It" (1965)	"634-5789 (Soulsville, U.S.A.)" (1966)	"Ninety Nine and a Half (Won't Do)" (1966)

"634-5789 (Soulsville, U.S.A.)" is a soul song written by Eddie Floyd and Steve Cropper. It was first recorded by Wilson Pickett on December 20, 1965 and included on his 1966 Atlantic Records album The Exciting Wilson Pickett with backing vocals by Patti LaBelle and the Blue Belles. The single reached number 1 on the Billboard Hot Rhythm & Blues Singles chart and number 13 on the Hot 100 singles chart.

== Background ==
The phone number 634-5789 is a reference to the Marvelettes' 1962 hit "Beechwood 4-5789".

== Personnel ==
- Charles "Packy" Axton – tenor saxophone
- Steve Cropper – guitar
- Donald "Duck" Dunn – bass
- Isaac Hayes – keyboards
- Al Jackson Jr. – drums
- Wayne Jackson – trumpet
- Andrew Love – tenor saxophone
- Floyd Newman – baritone saxophone
- Wilson Pickett – vocals

== Chart performance ==
Chart (1966)	Peak position
UK Singles (The Official Charts Company)	36
US Billboard Hot 100	13
US Top Selling Rhythm & Blues Singles (Billboard)	1

== Tina Turner version ==
"634-5789"

Single by Tina Turner & Robert Cray

from the album Tina Live in Europe
- B-side: "Help!" (Live)
- Released: 1989
- Recorded: 1986
- Genre: Pop, Soul, Rock, R&B
- Length: 3:05
- Label: Capitol
- Songwriters: Eddie Floyd; Steve Cropper
- Producer: John Hudson

Tina Turner singles chronology
"Tonight (Live)" (1988)	"634-5789 (live)" (1989)	"The Best" (1989)

Tina Turner recorded a live version of the track in 1986 as part of a segment in her Break Every Rule TV special, in which she interpreted classic soul songs with guitarist and singer Robert Cray, including "634-5789", Sam Cooke's "A Change Is Gonna Come" and Wilson Pickett's "Land of a Thousand Dances" and "In the Midnight Hour". The four tracks were later included on her 1988 album Tina Live in Europe and "634-5789", sung as a duet with Cray, was also issued as a single in certain territories, reaching number 14 on the Dutch singles chart. The B-sides were "Private Dancer" and "Help!", both taken from the Tina Live in Europe album.

=== Chart performance ===
Chart (1989)	Peak position
Belgium (Ultratop 50 Flanders)	23
Netherlands (Dutch Top 40)	15
Netherlands (Single Top 100)	14

== Other recordings ==
The song has also been recorded by: Otis Redding, Ry Cooder, Bon Jovi, Johnny Van Zant, Tower of Power, Trace Adkins, The Elgins, Rare Earth, and Sam & Dave.

== Popular culture ==
- Eddie Floyd and Wilson Pickett performed "634-5789" in the 1998 movie Blues Brothers 2000, appearing as the proprietors of "Ed's Love Exchange" which, according to the storyline in the movie, could be reached at 1-900-634-5789 (a reference to phone sex lines).

== See also ==
- "853-5937"
- "867-5309/Jenny"
- "Beechwood 4-5789"
- "Pennsylvania 6-5000 (song)"
- Fictitious telephone number
