= Always (Bon Jovi song) =

1994 single by Bon Jovi

Single by Bon Jovi

from the album Cross Road
- B-side: "Edge of a Broken Heart"
- Released: September 12, 1994
- Genre: Soft rock
- Length: 5:52 (album version); 4:55 (single edit); 4:37 (radio edit)
- Label: Mercury
- Songwriter: Jon Bon Jovi
- Producer: Peter Collins

Bon Jovi singles chronology
"Dry County" (1994)	"Always" (1994)	"Please Come Home for Christmas" (1994)

Music video
- "Always" on YouTube
- "Always" (Alternate Version) on YouTube

"Always" is a song by American rock band Bon Jovi. The power ballad was released in September 1994 by Mercury Records as a single from the band's first official greatest hits album, Cross Road (1994). The song was bass player Alec John Such's final single with the band before he left in late 1994.

"Always" went on to become one of Bon Jovi's best-selling singles, with a million copies sold in the US and more than three million worldwide. It reached number four on the US Billboard Hot 100, becoming the band's 11th and last top-10 hit. It was an international hit as well, peaking at number one in Canada, Flanders, Ireland, Israel, Lithuania, Mexico, and Switzerland and entering the top five in most countries in which it charted. The accompanying music video for the song was directed by Marty Callner.

== Song origin ==
The song was originally written by Jon Bon Jovi for the soundtrack to the 1993 film Romeo Is Bleeding, starring Gary Oldman as a corrupt cop and Mafia aide who is renounced by his wife. After being unimpressed by a preview screening of the movie – which was a critical and box office flop – he decided not to lend "Always" to the producers. Bon Jovi commented, "The script was great: the movie wasn't." He left the track on his shelf and forgot about it until John Kalodner, a friend and A&R executive, found it and convinced him to re-record and release the song.

== Critical reception ==
Larry Flick from Billboard magazine described "Always" as "a charming new tune that banks on a crisp guitar breeze generated by Richie Sambora and Jon Bon Jovi's familiar rasp." He added, "With lush orchestration by Michael Kamen and gradual shifts in tempo, grand track is easily one of the band's most interesting efforts to date. Prepare for deservedly active airplay well into the fall season." In his weekly UK chart commentary, James Masterton wrote, that it "is an epic ballad of the type they are so fond of penning and a bit of judicious promotion smashes it straight into the Top 5."

Alan Jones from Music Week gave the song a score of four out of five and named it Pick of the Week, writing, "An intense rock ballad, with strings and piano filling out the group's sound, and Jon Bon Jovi delivering a strong, stylish lead. Shame about the weak bridge. Even so, this is sure to soar with a TOTP appearance already in the bag." Tommy Udo from NME declared it as "softy rock", commenting, "It's really between Jon Bon Jovi and Bryan Adams for the title as king of that genre which involves straining for the high notes in a big, emotional, best-a-man-can-get ballad. Bon Jovi wins because every track sounds like the theme for a crap epic starring Kevin Costner." Another NME editor, Paul Moody, said the song "is so Bryan Adams it turns up on his doorstep whenever it gets lost." Jonathan Bernstein from Spin viewed it as "karaoke Bryan Adams".

== Music video ==
The music video for "Always" was directed by American television director Marty Callner. It features Jack Noseworthy, Carla Gugino, Jason Wiles and Keri Russell. There is also an alternate version of the video that is just the band performing the song. The original version of the video reached one billion views on YouTube (the band's third song to do so) in March 2024.

== Live performances ==
The song's powerful lyrics and power ballad sound made "Always" an instant hit at live concerts, but the high demand on Jon Bon Jovi's vocals have seen it rarely performed in concert following the band's 1995–1996 These Days Tour. The song is featured on the band's Live From London video. During the 2005–2006 Have a Nice Day Tour it was occasionally performed in the acoustic style heard on the band's 2003 This Left Feels Right album. The band performed the original version on their Lost Highway Tour, particularly in the UK leg. A live version performed on the final night of the Lost Highway Tour was included on the concert DVD Live at Madison Square Garden. Since then, the song in its original version has been occasionally performed during every tour.

Done as a second encore in their Forever Tour at Madison Square Garden on 7/12/26.

== Track listings ==
- US 7-inch single

A. "Always" (single edit) – 4:52
B. "Living in Sin" – 4:37

- US CD and cassette single
1. "Always" (edit) – 4:52
2. "Never Say Goodbye" – 4:49
3. "Edge of a Broken Heart" – 4:33
- US maxi-CD single
1. "Always" (single edit) – 4:52
2. "I Wish Everyday Could Be Like Christmas" – 4:25
3. "Living in Sin" – 4:37
4. "Please Come Home for Christmas" – 2:53
- European CD single
- Australasian CD and cassette single
- Japanese mini-CD single
1. "Always" (edit) – 4:52
2. "Edge of a Broken Heart" – 4:33
- UK CD1
1. "Always" (edit)
2. "Always"
3. "Edge of a Broken Heart"
- UK CD2
1. "Always" (edit)
2. "Always"
3. "Edge of a Broken Heart"
4. "Prayer '94"
- UK cassette single
1. "Always" (edit)
2. "Always"

== Charts ==
=== Weekly charts ===
Weekly chart performance for "Always"
Chart (1994–1995)	Peak position
Australia (ARIA)	2
Austria (Ö3 Austria Top 40)	3
Belgium (SABAM)	1
Belgium (Ultratop 50 Flanders)	1
Belgium (Ultratop 50 Wallonia)	22
Canada Retail Singles (The Record)	1
Canada Top Singles (RPM)	1
Canada Adult Contemporary (RPM)	6
Chile (UPI)	3
Denmark (IFPI)	3
Europe (Eurochart Hot 100)	1
Europe (European AC Radio)	2
Europe (European Hit Radio)	1
European Atlantic Crossovers (Music & Media)	1
Finland (Suomen virallinen lista)	3
France (SNEP)	2
Germany (GfK)	4
Iceland (Íslenski Listinn Topp 40)	2
Ireland (IRMA)	1
Israel (Israeli Singles Chart)	1
Italy (Musica e dischi)	4
Lithuania (M-1)	1
Mexico (Notitas Musicales)	1
Netherlands (Dutch Top 40)	2
Netherlands (Single Top 100)	2
New Zealand (Recorded Music NZ)	4
Norway (VG-lista)	2
Scottish Singles Sales (Official Charts)	2
Sweden (Sverigetopplistan)	2
Switzerland (Schweizer Hitparade)	1
UK Singles (Official Charts)	2
UK Airplay (Music Week)	1
UK Rock & Metal (Official Charts)	1
US Billboard Hot 100	4
US Adult Contemporary (Billboard)	4
US Pop Airplay (Billboard)	2
US Cash Box Top 100	3

=== Year-end charts ===
1994 year-end chart performance for "Always"
Chart (1994)	Position
Australia (ARIA)	3
Belgium (Ultratop 50 Flanders)	19
Canada Top Singles (RPM)	33
Canada Adult Contemporary (RPM)	60
Europe (Eurochart Hot 100)	16
Europe (European Hit Radio)	20
Germany (Media Control)	44
Iceland (Íslenski Listinn Topp 40)	47
Netherlands (Dutch Top 40)	11
Netherlands (Single Top 100)	17
Sweden (Topplistan)	10
Switzerland (Schweizer Hitparade)	40
UK Singles (OCC)	7
UK Airplay (Music Week)	46
US Billboard Hot 100	91

1995 year-end chart performance for "Always"
Chart (1995)	Position
Australia (ARIA)	55
Austria (Ö3 Austria Top 40)	37
Brazil (Crowley)	60
Canada Top Singles (RPM)	53
Europe (Eurochart Hot 100)	33
France (SNEP)	16
Germany (Media Control)	87
US Billboard Hot 100	17
US Adult Contemporary (Billboard)	24
US Cash Box Top 100	22

=== Decade-end charts ===
Decade-end chart performance for "Always"
Chart (1990s)	Position
Austria (Ö3 Austria Top 40)	43
Belgium (Ultratop 50 Flanders)	12
Canada (Nielsen SoundScan)	23
Netherlands (Dutch Top 40)	63

== Certifications ==
Certifications and sales for "Always"
Region	Certification	Certified units/sales
Australia (ARIA)	5× Platinum	350,000^{‡}
Austria (IFPI Austria)	Gold	25,000^{*}
Brazil (Pro-Música Brasil)	Diamond	250,000^{‡}
Italy (FIMI)	Platinum	100,000^{‡}
Netherlands (NVPI)	Gold	50,000^{^}
New Zealand (RMNZ)	Platinum	30,000^{‡}
Russia (NFPF) Ringtone	Gold	100,000^{*}
Spain (Promusicae) (since 2015)	Platinum	60,000^{‡}
Sweden (GLF)	Gold	25,000^{^}
Switzerland (IFPI Switzerland)	Gold	25,000^{^}
United Kingdom (BPI)	2× Platinum	1,200,000^{‡}
United States (RIAA) Physical single	Platinum	1,000,000^{^}
United States (RIAA) Digital single	Gold	500,000^{‡}
^{*} Sales figures based on certification alone.^{^} Shipments figures based on certification alone.^{‡} Sales+streaming figures based on certification alone.

== Release history ==
Release dates and formats for "Always"
Region	Date	Format(s)	Label(s)	Ref.
United Kingdom	September 12, 1994	12-inch vinyl; CD; cassette	Mercury	
Japan	October 7, 1994	Mini-CD	Mercury	
