= Juno Awards of 1980 =

Canadian music awards ceremony

- Date: 2 April 1980
- Venue: Harbour Castle Hilton Hotel, Toronto, Ontario
- Hosted by: Burton Cummings

Television/radio coverage
- Network: CBC

The Juno Awards of 1980, representing Canadian music industry achievements of the previous year, were awarded on 2 April 1980 in Toronto at a ceremony hosted by Burton Cummings at the Harbour Castle Hilton.

CBC Television broadcast the ceremonies throughout Canada from 9pm Eastern Time, and the show was seen by an estimated 1,500,000 viewers .

The show included a number of lip synced performances from Rough Trade with their controversial (at the time) song "High School Confidential", France Joli singing her Disco hit "Come to Me", Burton Cummings singing his hit "Fine State of Affairs", Max Webster with their "Paradise Skies" and pianist Frank Mills playing "Peter Piper". The only live performance of the night was two songs in a row from Gordon Lightfoot, "On the High Seas" and "If You Need Me" (both from his recent Dream Street Rose album), which were quickly added to fill up air time when Paul Anka was unexpectedly absent to receive his "Canadian Music Hall of Fame" award.

The biggest winner of the night was Anne Murray with four awards including the Album and Single of the Year awards. Murray was once again absent from the award show, this time due to the recent death of her father.

The band Trooper received an unusual nomination for two of their songs in the same category for "Composer of the Year", although technically the songs were from two different albums both charting at the time.

The last award of the show was "Male Vocalist of the Year" presented by ambassador Ken Taylor to the winner Burton Cummings.

== Nominees and winners ==
=== Female Vocalist of the Year ===
Winner: Anne Murray

Other nominees:

- Carroll Baker
- Claudja Barry
- Lisa Dal Bello
- Joni Mitchell

=== Male Vocalist of the Year ===
Winner: Burton Cummings

Other nominees:

- Bruce Cockburn
- Murray McLauchlan
- Gino Vannelli
- Neil Young

=== Most Promising Female Vocalist of the Year ===
Winner: France Joli

Other nominees:

- Alma Faye Brooks
- Nana McLean
- Karen Silver
- Laura Vinson

=== Most Promising Male Vocalist of the Year ===
Winner: Walter Rossi

Other nominees:

- Bryan Adams
- Gary Fjellgaard
- Freddie James
- Richard Stepp

=== Group of the Year ===
Winner: Trooper

Other nominees:

- April Wine
- Max Webster
- Prism
- Rush

=== Most Promising Group of the Year ===
Winner: Streetheart

Other nominees:

- FM
- The Minglewood Band
- The Raes
- Teaze

=== Composer of the Year ===
Winner: Frank Mills, "Peter Piper" by Frank Mills

Other nominees:

- Tony Green, "Everybody Get Up and Boogie" by Freddie James
- Brian Smith, Ra McGuire, "The Boys in the Bright White Sportscar" by Trooper
- Brian Smith, Ra McGuire, "3 Dressed Up as a 9" by Trooper
- Gino Soccio, "Dancer" by Gino Soccio

=== Country Female Vocalist of the Year ===
Winner: Anne Murray

Other nominees:

- Carroll Baker
- Marie Bottrell
- Glory-Anne Carriere
- Iris Larratt

=== Country Male Vocalist of the Year ===
Winner: Murray McLauchlan

Other nominees:

- Wilf Carter
- Eddie Eastman
- Ray Griff
- Ronnie Prophet

=== Country Group or Duo of the Year ===
Winner: The Good Brothers

Other nominees:

- Carlton Showband
- The Emeralds
- Family Brown
- The Mercey Brothers

=== Folk Artist of the Year ===
Winner: Bruce Cockburn

Other nominees:

- Murray McLauchlan
- Gordon Lightfoot
- Joni Mitchell
- Valdy

=== Instrumental Artist of the Year ===
Winner: Frank Mills

Other nominees:

- Liona Boyd
- André Gagnon
- Hagood Hardy
- Gino Soccio

=== Producer of the Year ===
Winner: Bruce Fairbairn, Armageddon by Prism

Other nominees:

- Bob Gallo, Night Music by Hellfield
- Paul Gross, Images at Twilight by Saga
- Andre Perry, I Want You by Wilson Pickett
- Domenic Troiano, Fret Fever by Domenic Troiano

=== Recording Engineer of the Year ===
Winner: David Greene, Concerto for Contemporary Violin by Paul Hoffert

Other nominees:

- Nick Blagona, "Say Hello" by April Wine, "Under My Thumb", Streetheart
- Andrew Hermant, "The Birdwalk" by Hagood Hardy, Riel Soundtrack by Bill McCauley
- Paul Page, "Hold on I'm Comin'" by Karen Silver
- Mark Wright, "Let Go the Line" and "Paradise Skies" by Max Webster

=== Canadian Music Hall of Fame ===
Winner: Paul Anka

== Nominated and winning albums ==
=== Album of the Year ===
Winner: Anne Murray, New Kind of Feeling

Other nominees:

- Armageddon, Prism
- Flying Colors, Trooper
- Hemispheres, Rush
- Hot Shots, Trooper

=== Best Album Graphics ===
Winner: Rodney Bowes, Cigarettes by The Wives

Other nominees:

- Rodney Bowes, Good-Bye LA by Bob Segarini
- Heather Cooper, Hoffert: Concerto for Contemporary Violin/Stravinsky by Paul Hoffert
- Dave Elliot, Private Eye (self-titled)
- Paul Hodgson, Rendezvous by CANO

=== Best Children's Album ===
Winner: Sharon, Lois & Bram, Smorgasbord

Other nominees:

- Chickery Chick, Sandra Beech
- Going Bananas, All the Performers of the Mariposa in the Schools Program
- I Lost My Pet Lizard, Brenda and Paul Hoffert
- Mr. Dressup, For a Song, Ernie Coombs

=== Best Classical Album of the Year ===
Winner: The Crown of Ariadne, Judy Loman, R. Murray Schafer (composer)

Other nominees:

- Loving, Kathy Terrell, Jean MacPhail, Susan Gudgeon, Mary Lou Fallis, Chamber Orchestra, Robert Aitken (conductor)
- The Nutcracker Suite - Toronto Symphony Orchestra, Andrew Davis
- Sonatas for Flute and Harpsichord No. 1,2,3, Robert Aitken, Greta Kraus
- The Stratford Ensemble, Raffi Armenian, Maureen Forrester

=== Best Selling International Album ===
Winner: Breakfast in America, Supertramp

Other nominees:

- Blondes Have More Fun, Rod Stewart
- Get the Knack, The Knack
- Nightflight to Venus, Boney M
- Spirits Having Flown, Bee Gees

=== Best Jazz Album ===
Winner: Sackville 4005, Ed Bickert, Don Thompson

Other nominees:

- Determination, Michael Stewart, Keith Blackley
- Night Child, Oscar Peterson
- Rob McConnell & The Boss Brass Again, Rob McConnell and The Boss Brass
- Walking on Air, Jim Galloway

=== Comedy Album of the Year ===
Winner: A Christmas Carol, Rich Little

Other nominees:

- Billy Bishop Goes to War, Eric Peterson
- Cinderelly, Al Clouston
- Nestor Pistor, Nestor Pistor
- Steve's Record, Steve Ivings

== Nominated and winning releases ==
=== Single of the Year ===
Winner: "I Just Fall in Love Again", Anne Murray

Other nominees:

- "Boogie Woogie Dancin Shoes", Claudja Barry
- "(Everybody) Get Up and Boogie", Freddie James
- "Midnight Music", Martin Stevens
- "Under My Thumb", Streetheart

=== Best Selling International Single ===
Winner: "Heart of Glass", Blondie

Other nominees:

- "Born to Be Alive", Patrick Hernandez
- "Da Ya Think I'm Sexy?", Rod Stewart
- "Le Freak", Chic
- "Y.M.C.A.", Village People

== Bibliography ==
- Krewen, Nick. (2010). Music from far and wide: Celebrating 40 years of the Juno Awards. Key Porter Books Limited, Toronto. ISBN 978-1-55470-339-5
