= List of inductees of Canada's Walk of Fame =

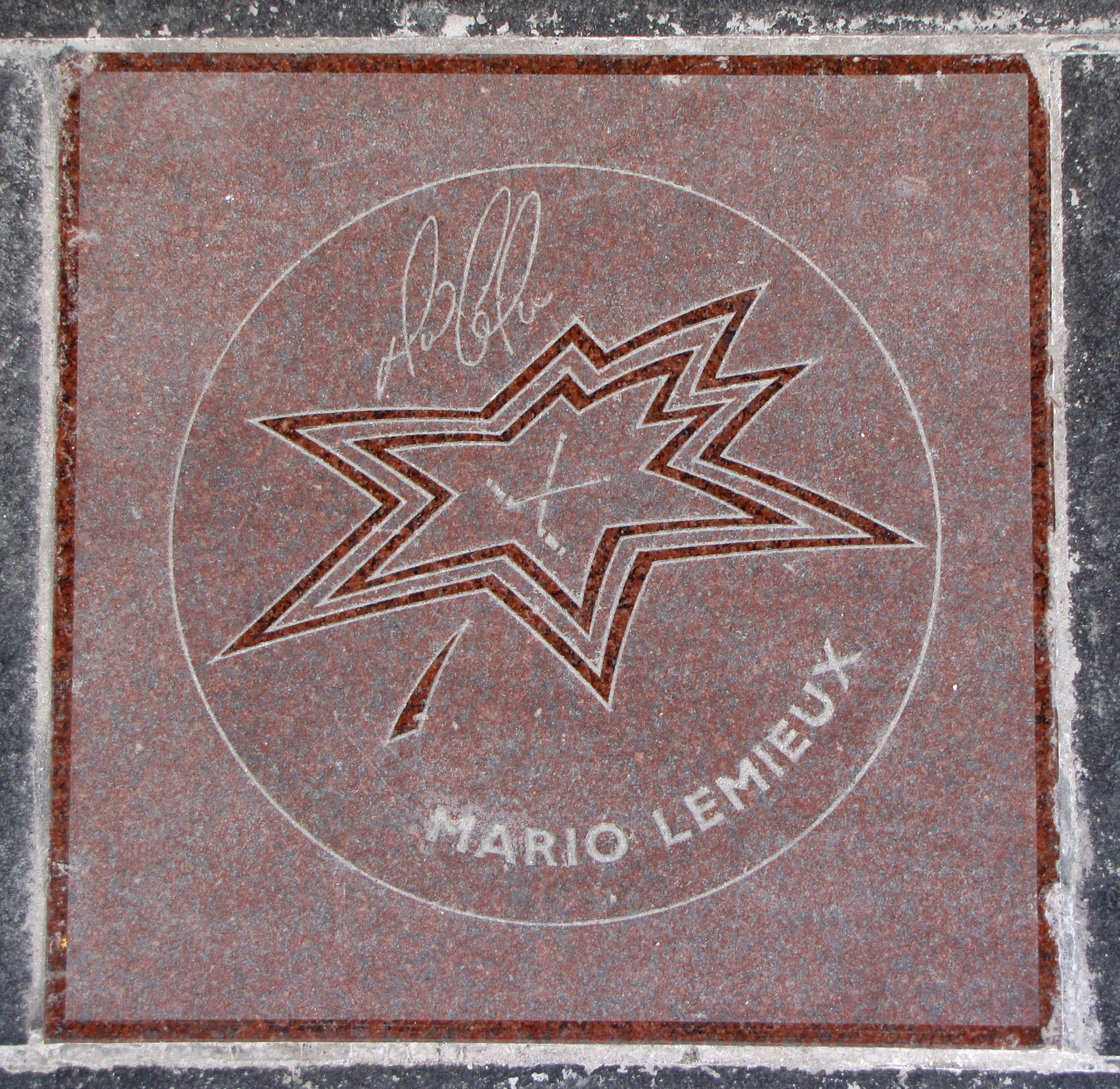
Mario Lemieux's star

Canada's Walk of Fame, located in Toronto, Ontario, is a walk of fame that acknowledges the achievements and accomplishments of successful Canadians. It consists of a series of stars imbedded in 13 designated blocks worth of sidewalks in Toronto, located in front of Roy Thomson Hall, the Princess of Wales Theatre, and the Royal Alexandra Theatre on King and Simcoe streets. The first group of members was inducted in 1998, and it has since expanded to include the RBC Emerging Artist Music Mentorship Prize competition, which assists emerging Canadian musicians with getting their careers off the ground.

The Walk of Fame was first conceived in 1996 when Peter Soumalias suggested the idea of a Walk of Fame for famous Torontonians to the board of the Toronto Entertainment District Association. They rejected his idea but he went on to establish a Walk of Fame for Canadians. Canada's Walk of Fame runs an annual contest in which Canadians can nominate potential inductees. In 2000, prior to the introduction of the online voting system, over 30,000 nominations were received via letters, fax and e-mail. The committee then analyzes the nominees based on the following criteria: the nominee was born in Canada or has spent their formative or creative years in Canada, they have had a minimum of 10 years experience in their field and they have had a national or international impact on Canada's Cultural heritage. Following the Selection Committee's evaluation, the nominees that meet all of the requirements are forwarded to the board of directors, who then select the inductees.

New inductees are inducted annually at an unveiling ceremony where their star, a stylized maple leaf, is revealed. The first was held in 1998 and only four of the twelve then-living inductees attended: Karen Kain, Norman Jewison, Barbara Ann Scott and Rich Little. Since 2008, the Walk of Fame also hands out the Cineplex Legends Award, which is posthumously awarded "to Canadian pioneers in film, music, sport, arts, and innovation." In 2010 the Allan Slaight Award was introduced, which recognizes the achievements of young Canadians who have the ability to turn their talent into inspiration. The award is presented annually to a young Canadian who is making a positive impact in the field of music, film, literature, visual or performing arts, sports, innovation or philanthropy. The list of recipients of the Allan Slaight Award include: Nikki Yanofsky in 2010, Drake in 2011, Melanie Fiona in 2012, Carly Rae Jepsen in 2013, The Weeknd in 2014, Shawn Mendes in 2015, Brett Kissel in 2016, Shawn Hook in 2017, Jessie Reyez in 2018 and Alessia Cara in 2019.

Of the 168 stars on the walk of fame, 154 are for individuals, including athletes; coaches; actors, directors, writers and producers of movies, television and stage; singers, songwriters and musicians; playwrights; authors; comedians; cartoonists; and supermodels. Fourteen stars have been given to groups, such as music bands, comedy troupes and sports teams. In these cases, the group name is listed on the star and the names of individual members are omitted.

== Inductees ==
Some inductees were unable to attend the ceremony the year they were inducted, and as a result were honoured in a ceremony in a later year.

Year	Name	Area of recognition	Achievements
2012	1972 Canadian Summit Series hockey team	Team, ice hockey	Defeated the Soviet Union in the 1972 Summit Series, an eight-game series.
2023	Lee Aaron	Singer, songwriter	She had several hits in the 1980s and early 1990s, such as "Metal Queen", "Whatcha Do to My Body", and "Sex with Love".
1998	Bryan Adams	Musician	Won a Grammy Award, nominated for three Academy Awards for songwriting; also has a star on the Hollywood Walk of Fame. Adams was unable to attend his 1998 induction and was later honored at a ceremony in 2008.
2006	Pamela Anderson	Actress; model	Five-time Playboy cover girl; also noted for her role in Baywatch.
2005	Paul Anka	Singer, songwriter	Credited with writing over 900 songs, member of the Songwriter's Hall of Fame; also has a star on the Hollywood Walk of Fame.
2023	April Wine	Musicians	Members include: Myles Goodwyn, Jerry Mercer, Jim Clench, Steve Lang and Gary Moffet.
2014	Louise Arbour	Jurist, lawyer/philanthropist	Justice of the Supreme Court of Canada from 1999 to 2004; United Nations High Commissioner for Human Rights from 2004 to 2008; Companion of the Order of Canada.
2004	Denys Arcand	Director	His 2003 film The Barbarian Invasions won an Academy Award for Best Foreign Language Film; Companion of the Order of Canada.
2006	Jann Arden	Musician	Winner of eight Juno Awards.
2022	Arkells	Musicians	Members include: Max Kerman, Mike DeAngelis, Nick Dika, Tim Oxford and Dan Griffin.
2019	Will Arnett	Actor	Best known for his work on the sitcom Arrested Development as well as on the animated comedy BoJack Horseman.
2001	Kenojuak Ashevak	Painter, sculptor	Companion of the Order of Canada.
2001	Margaret Atwood	Author	Won the Booker Prize for The Blind Assassin, companion of the Order of Canada.
2002	Dan Aykroyd	Actor, comedian	Nominated for an Academy Award for Best Supporting Actor in 1989 for Driving Miss Daisy; charter member of Saturday Night Live.
2012	Randy Bachman	Musician, singer	Has earned 120 gold and platinum album/singles awards and sold over 40 million records worldwide as a solo artist and various bands, including The Guess Who and Bachman-Turner Overdrive.
2017	Donovan Bailey	Athlete, sprinter	Olympic sprinter.
2014	The Band	Musicians	Inducted into the Canadian Music Hall of Fame and the Rock and Roll Hall of Fame; Honoured with The Recording Academy's Grammy Lifetime Achievement Award.
2021	Frederick Banting	Doctor, Medical Scientist and Physician	Part of the team to discover insulin.
2008	Frances Bay	Actress	Won a Gemini Award for Road to Avonlea.
2016	Jeanne Beker	Television personality	Fashion reporter, author, TV personality.
2001	Jean Béliveau	Athlete, ice hockey	Member of the Hockey Hall of Fame, two-time NHL MVP, won 10 Stanley Cups, companion of the Order of Canada.
2001	Alexander Graham Bell	Inventor	Inventor of the telephone.
1998	Pierre Berton	Author	Winner of four Governor General's Awards, companion of the Order of Canada.
2021	Charles Best	Doctor, Medical Scientist	Part of the team to discover insulin.
2009	Blue Rodeo	Musicians	Won 11 Juno Awards, including five for Group of the Year.
2011	Roberta Bondar	Astronaut	Canada's first female astronaut.
2003	Scotty Bowman	Coach, ice hockey	Member of the Hockey Hall of Fame, two-time NHL coach of the year, coached nine Stanley Cup-winning teams and has the highest winning percentage in NHL history.
2007	Johnny Bower	Athlete, ice hockey	Member of the Hockey Hall of Fame, two-time Vezina Trophy winner, won four Stanley Cups.
2025	Liona Boyd	Arts & Entertainment	Classical guitarist and composer
2001	Kurt Browning	Athlete, figure skating	Four-time World Figure Skating Champion.
2015	Michael Bublé	Arts & Entertainment	Pop and jazz singer with multiple best-selling records.
2009	Raymond Burr	Actor	Inducted as a Canadian Legends Award recipient. Known for his portrayal of Perry Mason in the television series of the same name, for which he won two Primetime Emmy Awards for Outstanding Lead Actor – Drama Series; also has a star on the Hollywood Walk of Fame.
2008	James Cameron	Director	Won three Academy Awards in 1997 for best director, best film editing and best picture for the film Titanic; also has a star on the Hollywood Walk of Fame.
1998	John Candy	Actor, comedian	Part of SCTV.
2023	Tantoo Cardinal	Actress	The mother of Cliff Cardinal
1998	Jim Carrey	Actor, comedian	Won two Golden Globe Awards for The Truman Show and Man on the Moon. Carrey was unable to attend his 1998 induction and was later honoured at a ceremony in 2004.
2009	Dean and Dan Caten	Fashion designers	Creators of Dsquared^{2}, a high-end fashion label.
2009	Kim Cattrall	Actress	Born in Liverpool, England. Known for her portrayal of Samantha Jones in Sex and the City for which she won a Golden Globe Award for Best Supporting Actress.
1999	Juliette Cavazzi	Singer	Member of the Order of Canada.
2015	Don Cherry and Ron MacLean Coach's Corner	Sports, television	Hockey commentators and broadcasters.
2023	Chilliwack	Musicians	Members include: Bill Henderson, Brian MacLeod, Ab Bryant, Ed Henderson, and Claire Lawrence.
2005	George Chuvalo	Athlete, boxing	Member of the World Boxing Hall of Fame.
2002	Cirque du Soleil	Circus troupe	A world-renowned circus troupe that originated in Quebec; also has a star on the Hollywood Walk of Fame.
2010	David Clayton-Thomas	Musician	Lead singer and frontman for Blood, Sweat & Tears. Won three Grammy Awards, and a member of the Canadian Music Hall of Fame.
2009	Tom Cochrane	Musician	Member of the Canadian Music Hall of Fame. Won six Juno Awards, including Single of the Year for "Life Is a Highway".
2018	Leonard Cohen	Singer	Poet, songwriter, performer and novelist, composer of "Hallelujah".
2005	Michael Cohl	Music producer, concert promoter	Member of the Canadian Music Hall of Fame.
2021	James Collip	Doctor, Biochemist	Part of the team that discovered insulin.
2002	Alex Colville	Painter, printmaker	Officer of the Order of Canada.
2022	Lionel Conacher	Football Athlete, Hockey politician	He was inducted into Canada's Sports Hall of Fame in 1955, the Canadian Football Hall of Fame in 1964, the Canadian Lacrosse Hall of Fame in 1965, the Hockey Hall of Fame in 1994, and the Ontario Sports Hall of Fame in 1996.
2005	Pierre Cossette	Music producer	Executive-producer of Grammy Awards for 35 years, has a star on the Hollywood Walk of Fame.
2022	Deborah Cox	Singer, songwriter, actress, producer	She won Juno Award for Best R&B/Soul Recording, she Received a star on walk of fame, in Toronto's Scarborough Town Centre.
2003	Toller Cranston	Athlete, figure skating	Olympic figure skating bronze medalist in 1976.
2006	Crazy Canucks	Athlete, downhill skiing	Collectively earned 107 top 10 World Cup finishes from 1978 to 1984. Members were: Dave Irwin, Dave Murray, Steve Podborski, Jim Hunter and Ken Read.
2015	Wendy Crewson	Actress	
1999	David Cronenberg	Director	Officer of the Order of Canada, winner of the Cannes lifetime achievement award.
1999	Hume Cronyn	Actor	Nominated for Academy Award for Best Supporting Actor in 1944 for The Seventh Cross.
2011	Burton Cummings	Musician	Lead singer for The Guess Who, six-time Juno Award winner.
2021	Roméo Dallaire	Humanitarian, lieutenant-general	Force commander of United Nations Assistance Mission for Rwanda.
2025	Tirone E. David	Science, Technology & Innovation	Professor of Surgery at the University of Toronto; invented several new heart surgery procedures.
2023	Degrassi	Arts & Entertainment	Long-running and award-winning teen drama television franchise produced in Toronto since 1979.
2017	Viola Desmond	Businesswoman	Challenged racial segregation at a cinema in 1946.
1999	Céline Dion	Singer	Won five Grammy Awards; has sold over 200 million albums worldwide. Won the Eurovision Song Contest representing Switzerland. Companion of the Order of Canada. Has a star on the Hollywood Walk of Fame.
2022	Director X	Filmmaker	created the TV Series October Faction. created three films and music videos.
2004	Shirley Douglas	Actress	Won a Gemini Award. Member of the Order of Canada.
2011	Drake	Singer	
2019	Mr. Dressup	Children's entertainer	
2021	Laurent Duvernay-Tardif	Footballer	
2003	Jim Elder	Athlete, equestrian	Olympic gold medalist in 1968.
2003	Linda Evangelista	Supermodel	Supermodel.
2013	Bob Ezrin	Music producer	Canadian music producer and keyboardist
2002	Timothy Findley	Author, playwright	Won one Governor General's Award.
2012	Melanie Fiona	Singer	
2000	Maureen Forrester	Singer	Canada's "Grande Dame of Song".
2002	David Foster	Music producer	Won 15 Grammy Awards as a producer, including three for Producer of the Year, nominated for three Academy Awards for Best Song.
2000	Michael J. Fox	Actor	Won three Primetime Emmy Awards and one Golden Globe Awards for Family Ties and one Emmy Award and three Golden Globes for Spin City; has a star on the Hollywood Walk of Fame. Fox was unable to attend his 2000 induction and was later honoured at a ceremony in 2008.
2013	Terry Fox	Athlete, runner	Youngest person ever named a Companion of the Order of Canada. He won the 1980 Lou Marsh Award as the nation's top sportsman and was named Canada's Newsmaker of the Year in both 1980 and 1981. Died at age 22 from cancer, during which time he steadfastly kept active and fought with grace and dignity for his life.
2006	Brendan Fraser	Actor	Raised in Ottawa, Ontario, was part of the Screen Actors Guild Award winning cast of Crash.
2022	Barbara Frum	Radio, Television journalist	Born in Niagara Falls, was received four Alliance of Canadian Cinema, Television and Radio Artists (ACTRA) Awards, she won the National Press Club of Canada Award for Outstanding Contribution to Canadian Journalism in 1975 and was named to the Order of Canada in 1979 from Canadian Sesame Street.
2010	Nelly Furtado	Musician	Five-time Juno Award winner; won a Grammy Award for her song "I'm like a Bird".
2013	Victor Garber	Actor	Film, stage, musical theatre, and television actor and singer.
2019	Frank Gehry	Architect	Credits include the Guggenheim Museum in Bilbao, Spain and the Walt Disney Concert Hall in Los Angeles, California.
2023	Glass Tiger	Musicians	Members include: Alan Frew, Sam Reid, Al Connelly, Wayne Parker, and Michael Hanson.
2006	Robert Goulet	Singer; actor	Raised in Edmonton, Alberta, won a Grammy Award in 1963 for Best New Artist, won a Tony Award for Best Performance by a Leading Actor in a Musical in 1968 for The Happy Time; also has a star on the Hollywood Walk of Fame.
2021	Graham Greene	Actor	Oneida actor.
2015	Lorne Greene	Actor	His notable television roles include Ben Cartwright on the Western Bonanza and Commander Adama in the original science-fiction television series Battlestar Galactica and Galactica 1980.
1999	Nancy Greene	Athlete, downhill skiing	Won a gold and silver medal at the 1968 Winter Olympics, Canadian female athlete of the half century (1950–1999), Officer of the Order of Canada.
2002	Wayne Gretzky	Athlete, ice hockey	Member of the Hockey Hall of Fame, highest-scoring player in NHL history, nine-time NHL MVP, won four Stanley Cups, and was named Canadian male athlete of the half century (1950–1999).
2001	The Guess Who	Musicians	Inducted into the Canadian Music Hall of Fame, first Canadian band to have a No. 1 single in the United States.
2018	Chris Hadfield	Astronaut	NASA Mission Specialist, and Commander of the International Space Station.
2002	Monty Hall	Game show host; humanitarian	Host of Let's Make a Deal; also has a star on the Hollywood Walk of Fame.
2007	Rick Hansen	Athlete, Paralympics	"Man in Motion", won a gold medal at the 1980 Summer Paralympics.
2005	Rex Harrington	Ballet dancer	Officer of the Order of Canada.
2021	Bret Hart	Wrestler	5 time WWF champion, 2 time WCW World Heavyweight champion, WWE Hall of Famer. He has been credited with changing the perception of mainstream North-American professional wrestling in the early 1990s by bringing technical in-ring performance to the fore.
2016	Corey Hart	Singer	
2000	Evelyn Hart	Ballet dancer	Companion of the Order of Canada.
2012	Phil Hartman	Actor, voice actor	Inducted as a Canadian Legends Award recipient. Known as "The Man of A Thousand Voices", Hartman gained fame playing various characters on shows such as Saturday Night Live and The Simpsons.
2002	Ronnie Hawkins	Musician	Lived adult life in Toronto and later in Peterborough, Ontario; inducted into Canadian Music Hall of Fame.
2014	Jeff Healey	Musician	Grammy Award nominee and JUNO Award winner; inducted as a Cineplex Legends Award recipient.
2007	Jill Hennessy	Actress	Best known for roles on Law & Order and Crossing Jordan.
2010	Doug Henning	Magician	Inducted as a Canadian Legends Award recipient.
2015	Lawrence Hill	Literary Arts	
2002	Arthur Hiller	Director	Won the Jean Hersholt Humanitarian Award, nominated for an Academy Award for Best Director for Love Story, Officer of the Order of Canada.
2017	Shawn Hook	Singer	
2000	Gordie Howe	Athlete, ice hockey	Member of the Hockey Hall of Fame, six-time NHL MVP, winner of four Stanley Cups.
2010	Clara Hughes	Athlete, speed skating	One of Canada's most decorated Olympic athletes; won two bronze medals in cycling in 1996, and four medals (including a gold in 2006) in speed skating.
2000	William Hutt	Actor, stage	Acted in the Stratford Festival since it first started in 1953; Companion of the Order of Canada.
2024	Frank Hayden	Professor, humanitarian	
2012	Russ Jackson	Athlete, Football	A three-time winner of the CFL's Most Outstanding Player Award and was named the Most Outstanding Canadian four times.
1999	Lou Jacobi	Actor	Noted actor of stage, film and television.
2001	Ferguson Jenkins	Athlete, baseball	Won the National League Cy Young Award in 1971, inducted into the Baseball Hall of Fame.
2013	Carly Rae Jepsen	Singer	
2001	Harry Jerome	Athlete, sprinting	Won an Olympic bronze medal in 1964.
1998	Norman Jewison	Director	Nominated for three Academy Awards for Best Director for In the Heat of the Night, Fiddler on the Roof and Moonstruck, awarded the Irving Thalberg Award in 1999; Companion of the Order of Canada. Has a star on the Hollywood Walk of Fame.
2003	Lynn Johnston	Cartoonist	Creator of For Better or For Worse, won a Reuben Award for Cartoonist of the Year in 1985.
2022	Just for Laughs Gags	Comedy series	Created from the laugh tricks from Canada. This section requires specific casting related to the show spawned a spinoff, Just Kidding. This show was filmed in Quebec City, Vancouver and Mexico.
1998	Karen Kain	Ballet dancer	Companion of the Order of Canada.
2004	John Kay	Musician, frontman	Born in Germany, moved to Canada as a teenager and began his musical career in Toronto. Frontman of the band Steppenwolf.
2008	The Kids in the Hall	Comedy troupe	Members include: Dave Foley, Bruce McCulloch, Kevin McDonald, Mark McKinney and Scott Thompson.
2013	Craig and Marc Kielburger	Humanitarians; activists	Humanitarian activist brothers.
2018	Andy Kim	Singer	
2016	Brett Kissel	Singer	
2019	Cindy Klassen	Skater	Won 5 medals at the 2006 Winter Olympics.
2004	Diana Krall	Musician	Won a Grammy Award and three Juno Awards.
2008	k.d. lang	Musician	Won four Grammy Awards and eight Juno Awards.
2005	Daniel Lanois	Music producer	Producer, won seven Grammy Awards, including Producer of the Year in 1993.
2015	Silken Laumann	Athlete, rower	
2023	Avril Lavigne	Singer, songwriter	
2004	Mario Lemieux	Athlete, ice hockey	Member of the Hockey Hall of Fame, Olympic gold medalist in 2002, three-time NHL MVP, winner of two Stanley Cups.
2001	Robert Lepage	Director; playwright	Former director of the Canadian Opera Company.
2006	Eugene Levy	Comedian	Member of SCTV, won two Primetime Emmy Awards and a Grammy.
2025	Shawn Levy	Actor	
1998	Gordon Lightfoot	Musician	Won 16 Juno Awards, nominated for five Grammy Awards, inducted into the Canadian Music Hall of Fame in 1986 and Companion of the Order of Canada.
2023	Lighthouse	Musicians, Rock Band	Members include: Skip Prokop, Ralph Cole, Paul Hoffert, Grant Fullerton, and Vic "Pinky" Dauvin won Juno Awards for Best Canadian Group of the Year in 1972, 1973, and 1974.
1998	Rich Little	Impressionist	Has a star on the Hollywood Walk of Fame.
2002	Guy Lombardo	Bandleader	Member of Canadian Music Hall of Fame, has three stars on the Hollywood Walk of Fame.
2023	Loverboy	Musicians, Rock Band	Members include: Mike Reno, Paul Dean, Doug Johnson, Scott Smith, and Matt Frenette. won Juno Awards for Album of the Year in 1982 & 1983.
2009	Howie Mandel	Game show host; comedian	Comedian, known for his roles in Bobby's World and St. Elsewhere and as host of the game show Deal or No Deal.
2018	Andrea Martin	Actress	Best known for her work in the television series SCTV.
2022	Tatiana Maslany	Actress	2016 Primetime Emmy Award winner
2023	Max Webster	Musicians	Members include: Kim Mitchell, Terry Watkinson, Mike Tilka, Paul Kersey, and Pye Dubois.
2004	Louis B. Mayer	Hollywood pioneer	Founder and head of Metro-Goldwyn-Mayer (MGM) Studios, raised in Saint John, New Brunswick. Has a star on the Hollywood Walk of Fame.
2014	Rachel McAdams	Actress	Won Gemini Award for Slings and Arrows in 2004; nominated for Screen Actors Guild Award for "Outstanding Performance By A Cast In A Motion Picture" for Midnight in Paris.
2010	Eric McCormack	Actor	Won a Primetime Emmy Award for Outstanding Lead Actor in a Comedy Series for his portrayal of Will Truman in Will & Grace. Received a star on the Hollywood Walk of Fame for his contributions to the television industry.
2023	Connor McDavid	Athlete, ice hockey	He reached 800 career points on February 21, 2023. He has won the Art Ross Trophy five times and has won the Hart Trophy three times.
2012	Sarah McLachlan	Singer, songwriter	Won three Grammy Awards and eight Juno Awards.
2016	Deepa Mehta	Filmmaker	
2015	Shawn Mendes	Singer	
2023	Rick Mercer	Comedian, Television Personality, Political Satirist, Author	Rick Mercer began to work with former CODCO members Cathy Jones and Mary Walsh, and fellow Newfoundlander Greg Thomey, to create a new television series for CBC Television which became This Hour Has 22 Minutes. In the first eight seasons of 22 Minutes, Mercer provided some of the show's signature moments, including an Internet petition (on the 22 Minutes website) to force Canadian Alliance leader Stockwell Day to change his first name to Doris.
2019	Mark Messier	Athlete	Recipient of the Order of Canada, Member of the Hockey Hall of Fame, Six Time Stanley Cup winner, and only player to Captain two teams to a Championship
2003	Lorne Michaels	Producer	Creator of Saturday Night Live; also has a star on the Hollywood Walk of Fame.
2023	Brenda Milner	Doctor, Neuropsychologist	Pioneer in the field of neuropsychology and in the study of memory and other cognitive functions in humankind.
2000	Joni Mitchell	Singer	Member of the Rock and Roll Hall of Fame, won nine Grammy Awards, companion of the Order of Canada.
2005	Alanis Morissette	Singer	Winner of 12 Juno Awards and seven Grammy Awards.
2010	Farley Mowat	Author	Best-selling author whose books include People of the Deer and Never Cry Wolf; Officer of the Order of Canada.
2009	Robert Munsch	Author, children's	Has lived and worked in Guelph, Ontario since 1975. Author of over 50 children's books, member of the Order of Canada.
1998	Anne Murray	Singer	Winner of four Grammy Awards, has 24 gold or platinum albums, companion of the Order of Canada; also has a star on the Hollywood Walk of Fame.
2003	Mike Myers	Actor, comedian	Won a Primetime Emmy Award for his work on Saturday Night Live; also has a star on the Hollywood Walk of Fame.
2019	James Naismith	Physical educator	Inventor of basketball.
2008	Steve Nash	Athlete, basketball	Born in Johannesburg, South Africa, but raised from early childhood in Victoria. Won two consecutive NBA Most Valuable Player Awards.
2011	Daniel Nestor	Athlete, Tennis	Born in Yugoslavia. Won over 70 ATP doubles titles, including seven Grand Slams and a gold medal at the 2000 Summer Olympics.
2007	Nickelback	Musicians	Won 12 Juno Awards, sold almost 30 million records worldwide.
2001	Leslie Nielsen	Actor, comedian	Officer of the Order of Canada; also has a star on the Hollywood Walk of Fame.
2025	Samantha Nutt	Physician, activist	Member of the Order of Canada "for her contributions to improving the plight of young people in the world's worst conflict zones, notably as a founder of War Child Canada."
2023	Kardinal Offishall	Rapper	Won a Juno Award for Rap Recording of the Year for Northern Touch by the Canadian hip-hop group Rascalz.
2011	Sandra Oh	Actress	Won a Golden Globe for Best Supporting Actress for her portrayal of Dr. Cristina Yang in Grey's Anatomy.
2007	Catherine O'Hara	Actress, comedian	Member of SCTV, won a Primetime Emmy Award.
1998	Bobby Orr	Athlete, ice hockey	Member of the Hockey Hall of Fame, eight-time Norris Trophy winner for best NHL defenseman, three-time NHL MVP, winner of two Stanley Cups.
2001	Walter Ostanek	Musician, Polka	"The Polka King", won three Grammy Awards for Best Polka Album.
2025	Our Lady Peace	Rock band	
2023	Michel Pagliaro	Musician, Guitarist	"The Massive Canadian Musician", nominated for the Male Vocalist of the Year award.
2017	Anna Paquin	Actress	
2023	The Parachute Club	Rock band	
2018	Jim Pattison	Businessman	
2011	Russell Peters	Comedian	One of the best-selling comedians in the United States, and winner of one Gemini Award.
2013	Oscar Peterson	Musician	Inducted as a Cineplex Legends Award recipient.
2009	Chantal Petitclerc	Athlete, wheelchair racing	Won 21 medals, including 14 gold, in wheelchair racing at the Paralympic Games.
1999	Mary Pickford	Actress	Won an Academy Award in 1929 for Coquette and a Lifetime Achievement Oscar in 1976; has a star on the Hollywood Walk of Fame.
2007	Gordon Pinsent	Actor	Won three Gemini Awards and two Genie Awards, companion of the Order of Canada.
2003	Luc Plamondon	Musician	Officer of the Order of Canada.
2023	Platinum Blonde	Rock band	
1998	Christopher Plummer	Actor	Companion of the Order of Canada, won an Academy Award for Best Supporting Actor for Beginners, won two Tony Awards.
2010	Sarah Polley	Actress, writer, director	Won two Gemini Awards and four Genie Awards; nominated for an Academy Award for Best Adapted Screenplay for Away from Her.
2016	Jason Priestley	Actor, director	
2023	Prism	Rock band	
2021	Keanu Reeves	Actor	Raised in Toronto, has a star on the Hollywood Walk of Fame.
2022	Heather Reisman	Founder, chief executive	co-founded Kobo to participate in the exploding e-reading market.
2001	Ivan Reitman	Director, producer	Raised in Toronto, has a star on the Hollywood Walk of Fame. Reitman was unable to attend his 1998 induction and was later honoured at a ceremony in 2007.
2000	Ginette Reno	Singer, actress	Officer of the Order of Canada.
2018	Jessie Reyez	Singer	
2014	Ryan Reynolds	Actor	Has appeared in a number of box office hits, was named People magazine's Sexiest Man Alive in 2010. Reynolds was originally announced for induction in 2011, but this was pushed back due to a scheduling conflict. Also has a star on the Hollywood Walk of Fame.
1999	Maurice Richard	Athlete, ice hockey	Member of the Hockey Hall of Fame, first player to score 50 goals in 50 games, Hart Trophy winner, eight-time Stanley Cup champion, companion of the Order of Canada.
2011	Mordecai Richler	Author	Inducted as a Canadian Legends Award recipient. Two-time winner of the Governor General's Awards, received Academy Award nomination for Best Adapted Screenplay for the film adaptation of his novel The Apprenticeship of Duddy Kravitz. Companion of the Order of Canada.
2000	Jean-Paul Riopelle	Painter	Companion of the Order of Canada.
2007	Lloyd Robertson	Journalist, anchor	Anchor of CTV National News for 30 years, won three Gemini Awards.
2003	Robbie Robertson	Musician	Guitar player of The Band, member of the Rock and Roll Hall of Fame.
2012	Sonia Rodriguez	Ballet dancer	Longtime member of the National Ballet of Canada and was promoted to principal dancer in 2000.
2018	Seth Rogen and Evan Goldberg	Actor and Screenwriter	
2017	Edward S. Rogers Jr.	Businessman	
2023	Michael Budman and Don Green	Entrepreneurship & Philanthropy	Members include: Michael Budman and Don Green.
2023	Rough Trade	Rock band	
2000	Royal Canadian Air Farce	Comedy troupe	Founding members include: Roger Abbott, Don Ferguson, Luba Goy and John Morgan.
1999	Rush	Musicians	Have 23 Gold and 14 Platinum records, inducted into Canadian Music Hall of Fame. Also has a star on the Hollywood Walk of Fame, and is a member of the Rock and Roll Hall of Fame.
1998	Barbara Ann Scott	Athlete, figure skating	Olympic Gold medalist in 1948.
2002	Second City Television	Comedy troupe	Original members include: John Candy, Joe Flaherty, Eugene Levy, Andrea Martin, Catherine O'Hara, Harold Ramis, Dave Thomas and later Rick Moranis and Martin Short.
2004	Mack Sennett	Hollywood pioneer	Co-founded Keystone Studios; also has a star on the Hollywood Walk of Fame.
2006	Paul Shaffer	Musician	Musical Director for the Late Show with David Letterman, won one Grammy Award.
2000	William Shatner	Actor	Portrayed Captain James T. Kirk in Star Trek, won two Primetime Emmy Awards and a Golden Globe Award for Boston Legal; also has a star on the Hollywood Walk of Fame.
2004	Helen Shaver	Actress	Won a Gemini Award in 2003.
2008	Douglas Shearer	Sound designer	Inducted as a Canadian Legends Award recipient. Won seven Academy Awards (the most of any Canadian) for sound and special effects, nominated for fourteen more.
2008	Norma Shearer	Actress	Inducted as a Canadian Legends Award recipient. Won an Academy Award for Best Actress in 1930 for The Divorcee, nominated for the same award five more times, has a star on the Hollywood Walk of Fame.
2000	Martin Short	Actor, comedian	Won a Primetime Emmy Award, Member of the Order of Canada.
2023	Rosalie Abella	Jurist	Abella has received at least 38 honorary degrees. She was a judge of the Giller Literary Prize.
2025	Isadore Sharp	Hotelier, philanthropist	
2013	Christine Sinclair	Athlete, soccer	Olympic Bronze medallist; and one of the most prolific scorers of all time.
2016	Darryl Sittler	Athlete, ice hockey	
2023	Gary Slaight	Radio personality, Talent Development	
2003	David Steinberg	Actor, comedian, writer, director	Won two Primetime Emmy Awards for directing Academy Awards telecasts, appeared on The Tonight Show 140 times.
2001	Teresa Stratas	Opera soprano	Won two Grammy Awards, Officer of the Order of Canada.
2000	Donald Sutherland	Actor	Won a Primetime Emmy Award and two Golden Globes, Officer of the Order of Canada; also has a star on the Hollywood Walk of Fame.
2005	Kiefer Sutherland	Actor	Born in London, England, won a Primetime Emmy Award for 24, son of fellow inductees Donald Sutherland and Shirley Douglas; also has a star on the Hollywood Walk of Fame.
2017	David Suzuki	Doctor, Environmentalist	
2022	James C. Temerty	Inspiring Leader and Philanthropist	
2001	Veronica Tennant	Ballet dancer	Companion of the Order of Canada.
2013	Alan Thicke	Actor	Actor, game show, and talk show host, songwriter.
2017	Stompin' Tom Connors	Singer	
2002–2022	The Tragically Hip	Musicians	Won 14 Juno Awards, inducted into the Canadian Music Hall of Fame. Presented with an honorary fellowship at the Windsor Arms Hotel from Royal Conservatory of Music in Toronto, Ontario.
2006	Alex Trebek	Game Show host	Long-time host of Jeopardy!, won five Daytime Emmy Awards for Outstanding Game Show Host; also has a star on the Hollywood Walk of Fame.
2019	Jim Treliving	Business man	
2019	Triumph	Rock band	
2023	Trooper	Musicians	Members include: Gogo, Scott Brown, Clayton Hill, Steve Crane, and David Steele.
2003	Shania Twain	Musician	Won five Grammy Awards.
1998	Jacques Villeneuve	Auto racing driver	Became the first Canadian to win the Indianapolis 500 in 1995, also won the Formula One World Championship in 1997 and the Champ Car championship in 1995.
2018	Tessa Virtue and Scott Moir	Athletes, figure skaters	
2004	Jack Warner	Film executive	One of the Warner Bros. Has a star on the Hollywood Walk of Fame.
2016	Al Waxman	Actor	
1999	Wayne and Shuster	Comedy duo	Johnny Wayne and Frank Shuster, won the Margaret Collier Award in 1998.
2014	The Weeknd	Singer	
2025	Mike Weir	Golfer	He is a Canadian professional golfer best known for his historic victory at the 2003 Masters Tournament.
2008	Daria Werbowy	Supermodel	Born in Kraków, Poland, ninth-highest-earning model in the world.
2014	Hayley Wickenheiser	Athlete, ice hockey	Won four gold and one silver medal at the Winter Olympics; elected to the International Olympic Committee's Athletes Commission.
2025	Tonya Williams	Actress	She burst onto our screens in 1976 with a slew of commercials including the national Wear a Moustache Milk campaign which put her in the national spotlight.
2025	Toronto International Film Festival	Film festival	
2005	Fay Wray	Actress, Hollywood pioneer	Portrayed Ann Darrow in King Kong (1933), has a star on the Hollywood Walk of Fame.
2010	Nikki Yanofsky	Singer	
2000	Neil Young	Singer	Inducted into the Rock and Roll Hall of Fame twice, with Buffalo Springfield and as a solo artist. Also was a member of Crosby, Stills, Nash & Young.

== See also ==
- Canada: A People's History
- Canadian Newsmaker of the Year
- Heritage Minutes
- List of stars on the Hollywood Walk of Fame
- Persons of National Historic Significance
- The Greatest Canadian
