= We're Here for a Good Time (Not a Long Time) =

Single by Trooper

from the album Knock 'Em Dead Kid
- Released: June 2, 1977
- Genre: Rock
- Length: 3:34
- Songwriter(s): Ra McGuire; Brian Smith
- Producer(s): Randy Bachman

Trooper singles chronology
"Santa Maria" (1976)	"We're Here for a Good Time (Not a Long Time)" (1977)	"Oh, Pretty Lady" (1978)

"We're Here for a Good Time (Not a Long Time)" is a song by Canadian rock band Trooper, released in June 1977 as the lead single from their third studio album, Knock 'Em Dead Kid. Despite only reaching #43 in Canada, the song continued to be popular, receiving a SOCAN Classic Award in 1999 for recognition of 100,000 radio plays.

== Charts ==
Chart (1978)	Peak position
Canada Top Singles (RPM)	43
