= Knock 'Em Dead Kid =

Studio album by Trooper
- Released: June 8, 1977
- Genre: Rock
- Length: 34:17
- Label: MCA
- Producer: Randy Bachman

Trooper chronology
Two for the Show (1976)	Knock 'Em Dead Kid (1977)	Thick as Thieves (1978)

Singles from Knock 'Em Dead Kid
- 1. "We're Here for a Good Time (Not a Long Time)"; 2. "Oh, Pretty Lady"

Professional ratings
Review scores
Source	Rating
AllMusic	4/5 stars

Knock 'Em Dead Kid is the third studio album by Canadian rock band Trooper, released in 1977. The album was produced by Randy Bachman. Bassist Harry Kalensky was replaced by Doni Underhill prior to the recording this album. Knock 'Em Dead Kid was the group's first platinum certified album in Canada. The album spawned the hits "We're Here for a Good Time (Not a Long Time)" and "Oh, Pretty Lady". It was recorded at the Phase 1 studio, Scarborough, Ontario.

== Track listing ==
All songs by Ra McGuire and Brian Smith except where noted.

Side one

1. "Knock 'Em Dead Kid" - 4:46
2. "Waiting on Your Love" (Ludwig) - 4:22
3. "Most of the Country" - 3:36
4. "You Look So Good" (McGuire/Smith/Ludwig) - 4:51

Side two

1. "We're Here for a Good Time (Not a Long Time)" - 3:34
2. "Oh, Pretty Lady" - 4:35
3. "Cold, Cold Toronto" (McGuire/Underhill) - 3:27
4. "(It's Been a) Long Time" - 5:06

== Personnel ==
- Ra McGuire - vocals
- Brian Smith - guitar
- Tommy Stewart - drums
- Doni Underhill - bass
- Frank Ludwig - keyboards, backing vocals, lead vocals on "Waiting For Your Love"

== Singles ==
- "Oh, Pretty Lady" / "(It's Been A) Long Time"
- "We're Here for a Good Time (Not a Long Time)" / "Loretta"
