= Two for the Show (Trooper album) =

Studio album by Trooper
- Released: June 1976
- Genres: Rock, hard rock
- Length: 34:24
- Label: MCA
- Producer: Randy Bachman

Trooper chronology
Trooper (1975)	Two for the Show (1976)	Knock 'Em Dead Kid (1977)

Professional ratings
Review scores
Source	Rating
AllMusic	3/5 stars

Two for the Show is the second album by Canadian rock band Trooper, released in 1976. The album was produced by Randy Bachman of Bachman–Turner Overdrive and the Guess Who fame. The album was certified platinum in Canada, and contained the hits "Two for the Show" and "Santa Maria". "The Boys in the Bright White Sportscar", initially released off this album, later became a hit when it was re-released (with a few modifications) on Hot Shots in 1979. It reached number 80 on the Canadian charts.

== Track listing ==
All tracks are written by Brian Smith and Ra McGuire except where noted.

Side one
No.	Title	Length
1.	"Two for the Show" (McGuire)	4:28
2.	"Gypsy Wheeler"	3:28
3.	"Santa Maria"	2:56
4.	"Loretta" (Smith, Tommy Stewart)	3:26
5.	"The Boys in the Bright White Sportscar"	2:59

Side two
No.	Title	Length
1.	"Ready"	3:26
2.	"Whatcha Gonna Do About Me"	3:28
3.	"I Miss You Already"	4:44
4.	"What's Gonna Happen Now?"	5:27

== Personnel ==
- Ra McGuire — lead vocals on all tracks except "Loretta"
- Brian Smith — guitar
- Frank Ludwig — keyboards; co-lead vocals on "Gipsy Wheeler"
- Harry Kalensky — bass
- Tommy Stewart — drums; lead vocals on "Loretta"

Additional personnel

- Randy Bachman — guitar on "Two for the Show" and "Whatcha Gonna Do About Me"

== Singles ==
- "Two for the Show" / "Gypsy Wheeler" (No. 32 CAN)
- "Santa Maria" / "Whatcha Gonna Do About Me" (No. 35 CAN)
- "Ready" / "I Miss You Already"
