= Raise a Little Hell =

1978 single by Trooper

Single by Trooper

from the album Thick as Thieves
- B-side: "A Fine Mess (You've Gotten Us Into)"
- Released: July 1978
- Genre: Rock; arena rock
- Length: 3:43
- Songwriters: Ra McGuire; Brian Smith
- Producer: Randy Bachman

Trooper singles chronology
"Oh, Pretty Lady" (1978)	"Raise a Little Hell" (1978)	"Round Round We Go" (1978)

"Raise a Little Hell" is a song by Canadian rock band Trooper, released in July 1978 as the lead single from their album Thick as Thieves. It is the band's only US Billboard Hot 100 entry. Widely regarded as their signature and most popular song, the song has become a staple track of classic and arena rock, regularly being played in sport stadiums across Canada and the United States.

In 2012, the song received a SOCAN Classic Award in recognition of 100,000 radio plays.

== Film and television ==
The song appeared in the television series Call Me Fitz and Stranger Things; and the films Gutterball (2008), Drive Angry (2011) and Bandit (2022).

== Legacy ==
"Raise a Little Hell" has become both a staple of classic rock radio stations and a popular sports anthem in Canada and the United States, most notably at National Hockey League and Major League Baseball games. CKKQ-FM "the Q" ranked the song at #10 on its list of "The 150 Best Canadian Songs".

From 1992 until the 2000s, the Ottawa Senators used "Raise a Little Hell" as its goal song.

The song is briefly used in the first season of Stranger Things. In 2025 it was used in a lip sync competition on Canada's Drag Race season 6 between Paolo Perfección and Sami Landri.

== Other versions ==
The song is covered by Canadian punk band GrimSkunk and appears on Fubar: The Album, which is the soundtrack to the film "FUBAR".

The song is covered by American rock band Head East and appears on their 2013 album Raise a Little Hell.

== Charts ==
Chart (1978)	Peak position
Canada Top Singles (RPM)	27
US Billboard Hot 100	59
