= Canadian Academy of Recording Arts and Sciences =

Canadian music organization

- Formation: 1975
- Type: Learned academy
- Headquarters: Toronto, Ontario
- Location: 219 Dufferin Street
- President: Allan Reid
- Affiliations: MusiCounts; Canadian Music Hall of Fame
- Website: carasonline.ca

The Canadian Academy of Recording Arts and Sciences (CARAS) is a non-profit organization responsible for promoting Canadian music and artists. It is famous for its Juno Awards, which recognize achievements in the music industry of popular songs and music created by Canadian musicians. It administers the Canadian Music Hall of Fame and the MusiCounts music education charity. CARAS's mandate is to promote and celebrate Canadian music and artists.

== History ==
CARAS originated to oversee the annual Juno Awards ceremony. The winners were previously selected by RPM readers. Within one year of its inception, CARAS boasted over six hundred members and took over the administration of the awards system created by founders Grealis and Klees.

The following initiative have been introduced through the years:

- In 1989, CARAS began awarding annual scholarships to exceptional graduates enrolled in post-secondary music industry programs.
- In 1997, CARAS created the Band Aid grant program and MusiCan (now MusiCounts), and began giving instrument grants to schools in-need. Subsequently, MusiCounts launched a Teacher of the Year Award, an instrument grant program for community organizations, a MusiCounts Ambassador award, and a new scholarship program.
- Since 1997, MusiCounts has awarded over $13,000,000 in support of music education in Canada. These funds have benefitted over 1,200 schools and communities, supported over 400 post-secondary music program graduates, and honored 14 extraordinary music teachers and four MusiCounts ambassadors.

== Juno Awards ==
The Juno Awards are Canada's premiere music awards show, which encompass a week-long celebration of Canadian music, culminating in The Juno Awards broadcast where Canadian artists are recognized for excellence of achievement in recorded music.

== Organization and programs ==
=== MusiCounts ===
MusiCounts, Canada's music education charity associated with CARAS, is dedicated to ensuring that young Canadians regardless of socio-economic circumstances and cultural background have the opportunity to experience the joy of music, explore their talent, build self-esteem, and above all dream big.

Since its establishment in 1997, MusiCounts will have:

- Awarded nearly 5 million dollars to help keep music alive.
- Impacted 262 Post-Secondary graduates and an estimated 400,000 students, their schools and communities.
- In 2011–2012, MusiCounts honored its 7th extraordinary music teacher through the MusiCounts Teacher of the Year Award.

=== Canadian Music Hall of Fame ===
CARAS has been inducting musicians into the Canadian Music Hall of Fame (CMHF) since 1978 and has inducted 57 artists and industry professionals since that time.

=== Chapters ===
The academy has eleven chapters in various locations throughout Canada. The eleven chapters are in British Columbia, Alberta, Saskatchewan, Manitoba, New Brunswick, Nova Scotia, Ontario, Prince Edward Island, Newfoundland and Labrador, Yukon and Northwest Territories.

== See also ==
- Juno Award
- Music of Canada
- National Academy of Recording Arts & Sciences
