= Gogo (musician) =

Canadian musician

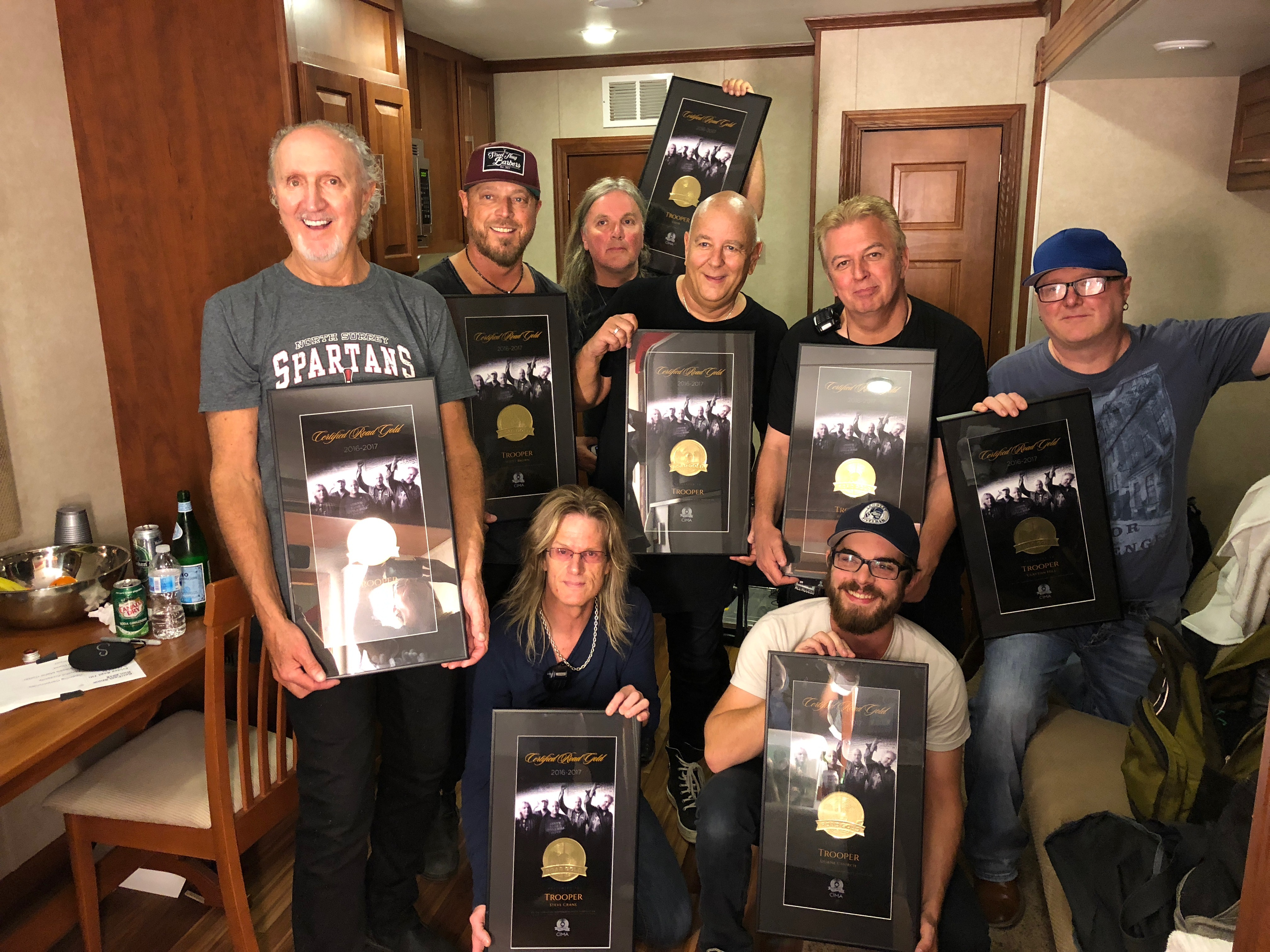
- Gogo (back) Trooper ROAD GOLD 2018

Background information
- Born: Paul Roland Gogo; April 24, 1965 (age 61); Nanaimo, British Columbia, Canada
- Genres: Rock, progressive rock, pop, psychedelic rock
- Occupations: Musician, author
- Instruments: Keyboards, piano, vocals, electric violin
- Years active: 1983–present

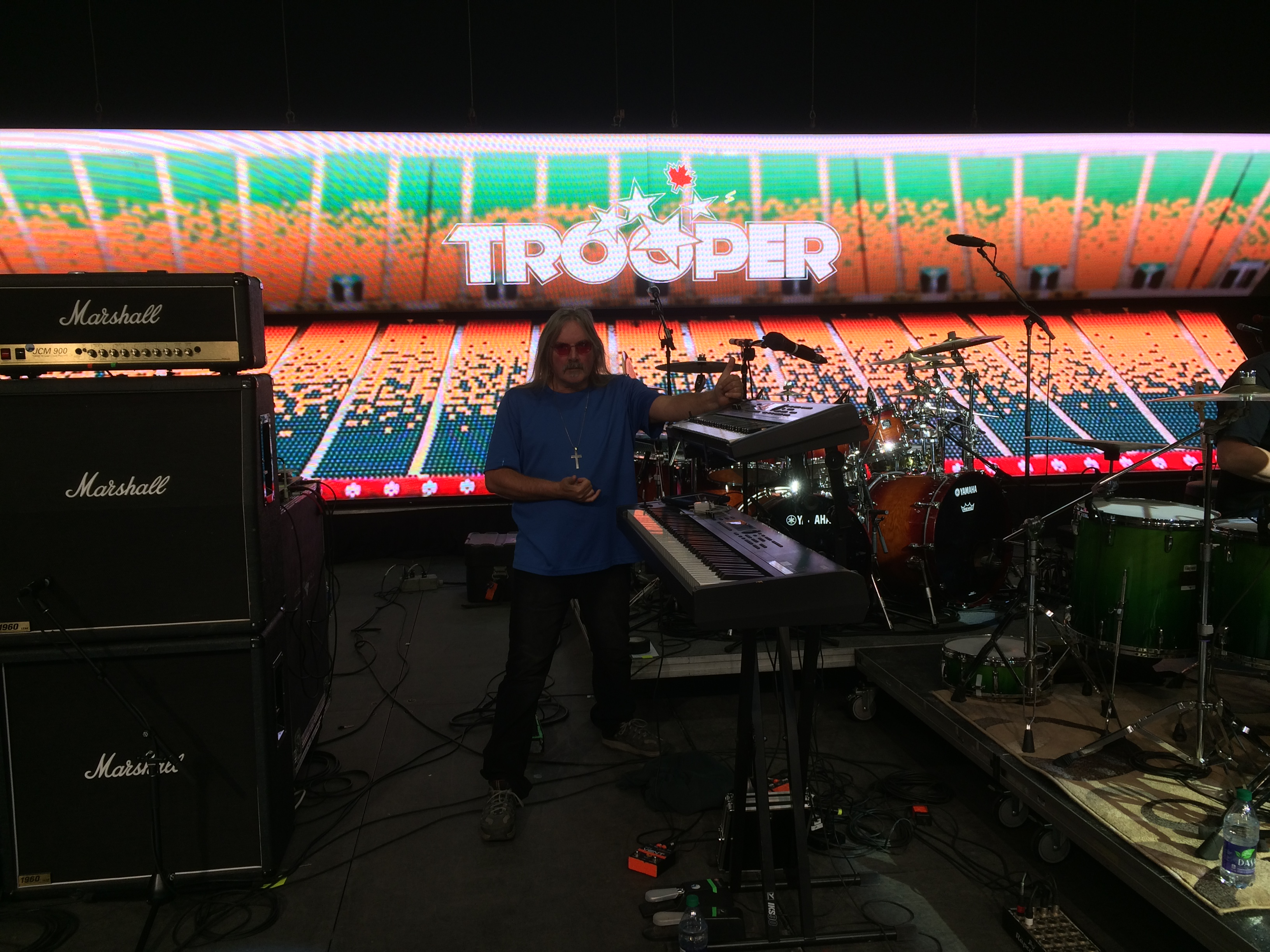
Gogo November 24, 2018 Edmonton AB Grey Cup

Paul Roland Gogo (born April 24, 1965), known as Gogo, is a Canadian rock-and-roll keyboard player, and multi-instrumentalist, best known for being the keyboardist of the Canadian rock band Trooper. His career has also included stints with rock vocalist Paul Laine.

He is also the author of Frank Ney: A Canadian Legend, a biography about British Columbia legislator, and longtime Nanaimo mayor Frank Ney.

In 2004, Gogo played a major role in the creation of Joyride!, the debut album of his psychedelic rock group, The Super Groovy Band. The album has received positive acclaim from reviewers around the world.

He was featured in the 2008 documentary film, Mellodrama: The Mellotron Movie. Gogo has an extensive collection of vintage electronic musical instruments which were on display in 2005 at the Royal British Columbia Museum in Victoria, British Columbia. Musical instruments collection included a rare early rev Sequential Circuits Prophet V synthesizer which he donated to the National Music Centre in Calgary for perpetuity

As part of the Vancouver 2010 Winter Olympics festivities, Gogo was featured when Trooper performed on February 21, 2010. Coverage of the event was broadcast in Canada and around the world on networks such as CTV and MuchMusic.

During the winter of 2013, he gained international attention having had a stolen heirloom Framus banjo returned to him by the unusual tactic of offering friendship as a reward.

He ran in an unsuccessful bid for Nanaimo City Council in 2014 suggesting partnerships on Civic projects and predicting a looming low-income seniors housing crisis. With Trooper, he received a White Hat from Tourism Calgary, a symbol of Western hospitality on September 24, 2015, and a Canadian Independent Music Association ROAD GOLD in the summer of 2018.

In May 2023, Trooper was inducted into the Canadian Music Hall of Fame and Gogo received the Juno statuette as one of the inducted members.

He is also the cousin of award-winning blues guitarist David Gogo and brother of Folk/roots musician John Gogo and brother of Marie Gogo Singer/Entertainer and original member of Juno Award winning Jerry Alfred The Medicine Beat.

== Early life ==
The youngest of seven children (all musicians), Gogo received formal training in music and dance during childhood. He was raised in Nanaimo by his parents Ken and Dodie Gogo, who were prominent musicians in the city. Ken Gogo is the only person to be presented with The Nanaimo Lifetime Cultural Achievement Award Posthumously and Dodie was choir director and organist with Saint Peters for 50 years between 1958–2008.

Gogo's first professional gig came at age 13, when he became the youngest ever hockey organist for the Nanaimo Clippers, a Junior "A", ice hockey team.

== Social and charity work ==
Gogo' is proprietor of Divine Mercy Transitional and Emergency House, providing safe affordable housing for low-income seniors.

He teaches group campfire guitar and ukulele classes (as volunteer) and has twice headlined the telethon for The Child Development Centre.

He also hosts numbers original community events as fund-raisers for STONE SOUP (which he is a director of) which is an independent charitable free-food source for up to 200 people per night.

Also, Gogo was instrumental in arranging The Saint Peters Emergency Shelter In Nanaimo and has attended his 3rd degree Knights of Columbus during his 4 terms on Parish Council.

During the COVID-19 pandemic in 2020–2021 he formed and recorded a new Contemporary Christian group called Jesus Music, which also includes Trooper bassist Scott Brown. The group describes itself as combining funk, orchestral, pop and ancient music.
