= Trooper (album) =

Studio album by Trooper
- Released: July 1, 1975
- Genre: Rock, hard rock
- Length: 33:54
- Label: MCA (LEGEND)
- Producer: Randy Bachman

Trooper chronology
Trooper (1975)	Two for the Show (1976)

Trooper is the self-titled debut studio album by Canadian rock band Trooper, released in 1975. The album was produced by Randy Bachman of Bachman–Turner Overdrive and The Guess Who. The album would produce two Canadian hits "Baby Woncha Please Come Home" and "General Hand Grenade". It reached number 60 on the Canadian charts.

== Track listing ==
(McGuire/Smith)

1. "I'm in Trouble Again" (3:19)
2. "General Hand Grenade" (3:06)
3. "All of the Time" (McGuire/Smith/Kalensky; 7:14)
4. "Eddy Takes It Easy" (3:20)
5. "Roller Rink" 4:48
6. "Baby Woncha Please Come Home" (3:04)
7. "Love of My Life" (5:17)
8. "Don't Stop Now" (3:50)

== Personnel ==
- Ra McGuire - vocals & harmonica
- Brian Smith - guitar
- Tommy Stewart - drums, vocals on "Love of My Life"
- Harry Kalensky - bass

== Singles ==
- "Baby Woncha Please Come Home" / "Roller Rink" (#45 CAN)
- "General Hand Grenade" / " "Don't Stop Now" (#14 CAN)
