= Trooper (band) =

Canadian rock band

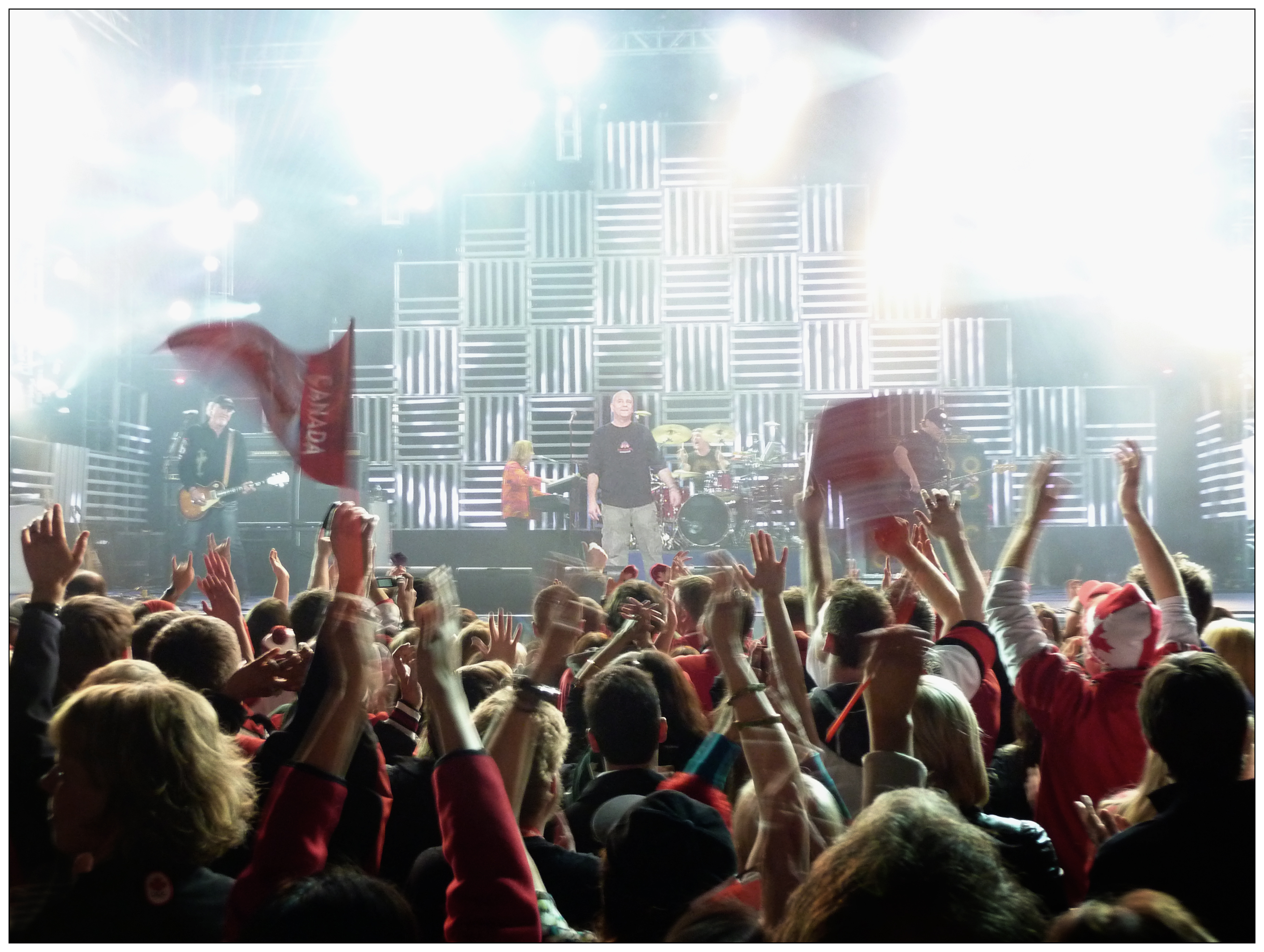
- Trooper performing at Vancouver 2010 Olympic Victory Ceremonies. From L-R: Brian Smith, Gogo, Ra McGuire, Clayton Hill, Scott Brown and former .

Background information
- Also known as: Canada's party band Winters Green (1967-1972) Applejack (1972-1975)
- Origin: Vancouver, British Columbia, Canada
- Genres: Rock, pop
- Years active: 1967–present
- Labels: MCA, RCA, Great Pacific Records
- Members: Paul Gogo; Scott Brown; Clayton Hill; Steve Crane; Paul Laine
- Website: trooper.com

Trooper is a Canadian rock band formed by singer Ra McGuire and guitarist Brian Smith in 1975. The group is best known for their 1970s hits "Raise a Little Hell", "We're Here for a Good Time (Not a Long Time)", "The Boys in the Bright White Sports Car", "General Hand Grenade", "3 Dressed Up as a 9", "Janine", "Two for the Show", "Oh, Pretty Lady", and "Santa Maria".

== History ==
=== Winter's Green, Applejack, and the 1970s ===
In 1967, Ra McGuire and Brian Smith played in a band called Winter's Green, which recorded two songs, "Are You a Monkey" and "Jump in the River Blues", on the Rumble Records Label. "Are You a Monkey" later appeared on a rock collection: 1983's The History of Vancouver Rock and Roll, Vol. 3.

In the early seventies, Winter's Green changed their name to Applejack and added drummer Tommy Stewart and bassist Harry Kalensky to their line-up. Applejack became a very popular band in the Vancouver area, and began touring extensively in British Columbia. The band played a few original tunes such as "Raise a Little Hell" and "Oh, Pretty Lady", as well as Top 40 songs by artists such as Neil Young and Chicago.

After hearing Applejack perform, Randy Bachman of Bachman–Turner Overdrive and The Guess Who signed the band to his "Legend" label. The band changed their name to Trooper, and Bachman produced the band's self-titled debut album, Trooper, which contained the Canadian hits "Baby Woncha Please Come Home" and "General Hand Grenade". Managed by Sam Feldman, Trooper began touring extensively in both Canada and the United States.

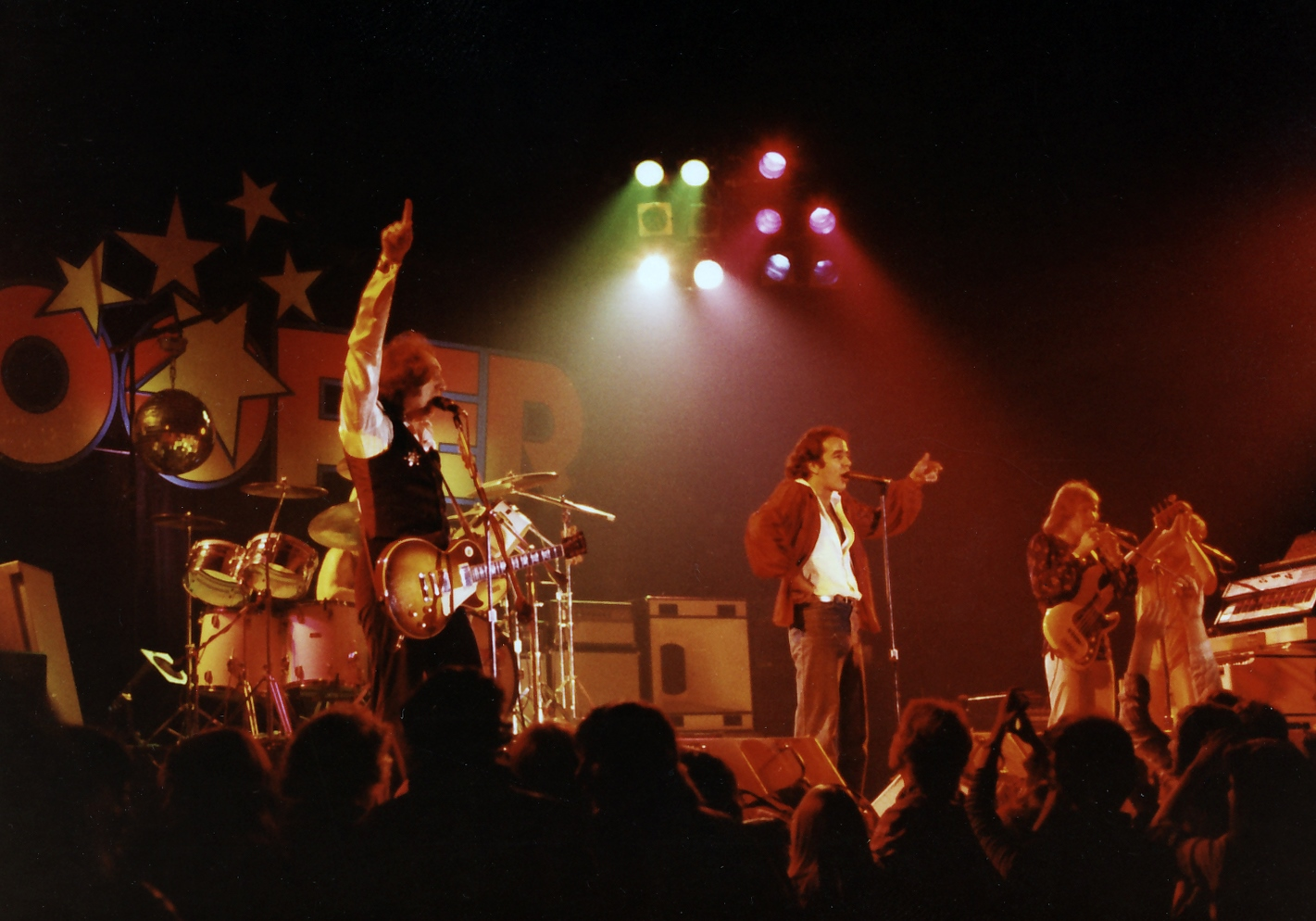
Trooper performing live in 1976. L-R: Tommy Stewart (view blocked), Brian Smith, Ra McGuire, Doni Underhill, Frank Ludwig

After moving from Legend Records to MCA Records, Trooper added Frank Ludwig on keyboards. Their 1975 debut album was followed by Two for the Show in 1976, which was certified Gold in Canada. The album contained the hits "Two for the Show", and "Santa Maria". The latter of the two hits was inspired from a trip by boat to Tugwell Island, near Prince Rupert, British Columbia.

Bassist Harry Kalensky was replaced by Doni Underhill before the recording of Trooper's third studio album. Knock 'Em Dead Kid, was released in 1977 and became the group's first Canadian Platinum record. This album contained the hits "We're Here for a Good Time (Not a Long Time)", and "Oh, Pretty Lady". In 1978, Thick as Thieves went double-platinum and featured the group's only successful U.S. single, "Raise A Little Hell". This album also contained the hits "Round, Round We Go" and "The Moment That It Takes", both of which were sung by keyboardist Frank Ludwig.

The band's 1979 album, Hot Shots, broke all records for Canadian sales of a Canadian album, reaching Quadruple-Platinum status. Hot Shots was a greatest hits album containing original tracks of the most popular songs that had been released as singles for Trooper's first four studio albums, as well as a remixed version of "The Boys in the Bright White Sports Car" (originally released on Two for the Show in 1976), which became a hit single upon the release of Hot Shots.

Trooper's fifth studio album, Flying Colors, was released in 1979, and contained the hits "Three Dressed Up as a Nine" and "Janine", the band's highest-charting single to date, which pushed the album to attain Double-Platinum status. Also in 1979, Frank Ludwig left the band and was replaced by Rob Deans, who performed on the next two albums.

=== 1980s ===
In April 1980, Trooper was honoured with a Juno Award for "Group of the Year". Two of their albums (Hot Shots and Flying Colors, both released in 1979) were also nominated that year for "Album of the Year". Trooper's self-produced seventh album Untitled released in October 1980, and Money Talks was released in 1982 and produced by Heart producer Mike Flicker and released on the RCA Label.

In 1980, Trooper severed their artist–producer relationship with Randy Bachman. In 1983, Tommy Stewart left the band and was replaced on drums by Marc LaFrance. In October 1985, bassist John Dryden and drummer Ronnie Baran joined the band replacing Doni Underhill and Marc LaFrance respectively. In 1986, Trooper was without a permanent keyboardist, and Frank Ludwig re-joined the band as a temporary replacement on their summer tour.

The Last of the Gypsies was released in 1989 on the band's self-owned Great Pacific Records label and distributed by Warner Music Canada. This was Trooper's first studio album in six years, and was certified Canadian Gold. It appeared on the RPM Top 100 Albums chart that year. It contained the hits "Boy With the Beat", and "The Best Way (to Hold A Man)".

=== 1990s ===
Ten, released in 1991, contained the regional hit "American Dream", and was the group's tenth studio album. Drummer John Stoltz played with the band from 1990 to 1995, when Lance Chalmers took his place and played with the band for eight years. In 1995, Gogo replaced Blaine Smith, becoming Trooper's keyboardist and in 1996, bassist Scott Brown joined the band. Both Gogo and Brown continue to tour and perform with Trooper today.

In 1998, Trooper guest starred on This Hour Has 22 Minutes New Year's Special. Their songs were also played in numerous episodes of 22 Minutes throughout the 8th season (2000–2001). At the 1999 SOCAN Awards, Trooper songwriters Brian Smith and Ra McGuire received SOCAN Classic Awards for "We're Here for a Good Time" and "Santa Maria", presented for songs that have received over 100,000 documented radio plays, becoming deeply embedded in the fabric of Canadian radio and culture. Ra McGuire also received a Classic Award for the Trooper hit "Two for the Show".

=== 2000s ===
In 2001, Shot Spots, a punk tribute to Trooper, was released on Visionary Records. It contains 30 Trooper songs performed by 30 Canadian punk bands (D.O.A., SNFU, Dirty Bird, Dayglo Abortions and others) and an introduction by Canadian comedian Rick Mercer. As detailed in a four-page 2004 photo essay by Todd Korol in the magazine Maclean's and a two-page 2005 story in The Globe and Mail by Peter Cheney, Trooper is still very active and popular as a touring band, performing as many as 100 shows a year across Canada.

Trooper songwriters Brian Smith and Ra McGuire received a fourth SOCAN Classic Award in 2005, for "Oh, Pretty Lady." In April 2006, Trooper singer and songwriter, Ra McGuire, released his first book, published by Insomniac Press, Here For a Good Time – On the Road With Trooper, Canada's Legendary Rock Band. In late 2006, drummer Clayton Hill joined the band and continues to tour and perform with Trooper.

=== 2010 onwards ===
2010 saw Trooper celebrating their 35th Anniversary – starting with their performance at the 2010 Vancouver Winter Olympics Victory Ceremony on February 21, which was broadcast across Canada and the world on networks such as CTV and MuchMusic, and ending with their performance on November 28 at Commonwealth Stadium in Edmonton for the 98th Grey Cup, with shows throughout the year and coast to coast, many which broke attendance records.

Trooper's first official compilation album Hits From 10 Albums was released on July 1, 2010. The totally updated and re-mastered collection featured songs spanning the entirety of their recording career. John Kereiff of Gonzo Magazine called it "THE summer album of 2010." Universal Music's official Press Release named Trooper as "one of Canada's top five selling bands of all time".

On August 11, 2010, the members of Trooper enjoyed a private tour of the Gatineau Preservation Centre to see where Library and Archives Canada houses its collected Trooper archives. The Trooper archives consist of 401 photographs and a stack of textual records such as financial records, which McGuire and Smith donated in 2004, hoping to provide some insight to the Canadian music industry of the 1970s and 1980s. McGuire, "now 60, bald, and bespectacled" had a chance to laugh when he read aloud from an old Toronto Sun clipping among the collection which described McGuire as "a new teen idol." The band later made another donation to the archive, including some of their early demo recordings, lyrics sheets, and master tapes. The band has also donated the massive 32-foot sign bearing Trooper's logo, complete with strobe-lit stars once used to illuminate their shows, to the Canadian Museum of Civilization.

In 2012, Ra McGuire and Brian Smith were presented with the SOCAN National Achievement Award, which is presented to members who have had outstanding success, predominantly in the Canadian music industry, over the span of their career. They also received three SOCAN Classic Awards for "Raise a Little Hell", "General Hand Grenade", and "Janine".

In November 2019, Brian Smith was presented with the Fraser Valley Music Lifetime Achievement Award. In November 2021, founding members Ra McGuire and Brian Smith announced their retirement.

On May 18, 2023, at the National Music Centre in Calgary, Alberta, Trooper was inducted into the Canadian Music Hall of Fame. Trooper was also inducted into Canada's Walk of Fame at the Rock of Fame event on September 28, 2023, at Massey Hall, Toronto.

Trooper was inducted into the BC Entertainment Hall of Fame and unveiled their StarWalk star in front of the Commodore Ballroom in Vancouver, British Columbia, on September 6, 2024. Twenty former and current band members attended. With Smith and McGuire's encouragement and blessing, Trooper continues to perform with Gogo, Scott Brown, and Clayton Hill, the longest running members of the band. Longtime west coast musician and Trooper guitar tech Steve Crane takes the lead guitar position, and international recording artist Paul Laine performs lead vocals.

== Members ==
=== Current members ===
- Gogo – keyboards, harmonica, acoustic guitar (1995–present)
- Scott Brown – bass (1996–present)
- Clayton Hill – drums (2006–present)
- Steve Crane – guitar (2021–present)
- Paul Laine – vocals (2024–present)

=== Former members ===
- Ra McGuire – vocals, harmonica, acoustic guitar (founding member, 1967–2021)
- Brian Smith – guitar (founding member, 1967–2021)
- Tommy Stewart – drums (1972–1983)
- Harry Kalensky – bass (1972–1976)
- Frank Ludwig – keyboards (1976–1979)
- Doni Underhill – bass (1976–1985)
- Rob Deans – keyboards (1979–1986)
- Marc LaFrance – drums (1983–1985)
- Ronnie Baran – drums (1985–1988)
- John Dryden – bass (1985–1992)
- Richard Sera – keyboards (1988)
- Aaron Anderson – drums (1989)
- Blaine Smith – keyboards (1987–1995)
- Larry Church – bass (1989–1992)
- Mike Schmidt – drums (1988–1989)
- John Stoltz – drums (1989–1990, 1990–1992)
- Skip Prest – guitar (1992: Died 2025)
- Tony Ferraro – drums (1990)
- Timothy B. Hewitt – bass (1992–1996)
- Lance Chalmers – drums (1995–2002)
- Frankie Baker – drums (2003–2006)
- David Steele – vocals (2022–2024)

== Discography ==
=== Studio albums ===
| Title | Details | Peak chart positions | Certifications |
| Title | Details | CAN | Certifications |
|---|---|---|---|
| Trooper | Release date: July 1, 1975; Label: MCA | 60 | |
| Two for the Show | Release date: June 26, 1976; Label: MCA | 80 | CAN: Platinum |
| Knock 'Em Dead Kid | Release date: June 8, 1977; Label: MCA | 42 | CAN: Platinum |
| Thick as Thieves | Release date: June 19, 1978; Label: MCA | 17 | CAN: 2× Platinum |
| Flying Colors | Release date: September 4, 1979; Label: MCA | 7 | CAN: 2× Platinum |
| Untitled | Release date: October 4, 1980; Label: MCA | 63 | |
| Money Talks | Release date: April 1, 1982; Label: RCA | 39 | |
| The Last of the Gypsies | Release date: May 29, 1989; Label: Great Pacific Records | 43 | CAN: Gold |
| Ten | Release date: June 5, 1991; Label: Great Pacific Records | 52 | |

=== Compilation albums ===
At least one unauthorized compilation album has been released featuring Trooper's hits. Trooper's second official compilation album was released on July 1, 2010, celebrating the band's 35th anniversary.

| Title | Details | Peak chart positions | Certifications |
| Title | Details | CAN | Certifications |
|---|---|---|---|
| Hot Shots | Release date: March 5, 1979; Label: MCA; Reissue release date: July 17, 2020; Label: Universal Music Canada | 2 | CAN: 6× Platinum |
| Hits from 10 Albums | Release date: July 1, 2010; Label: Universal Music Canada | 75 | |

=== Singles ===
| Year | Single | Peak chart positions | | Album |
| Year | Single | CAN | US | Album |
|---|---|---|---|---|
| 1975 | "Baby Woncha Please Come Home" | 45 | — | Trooper |
| 1976 | "General Hand Grenade" | 14 | — | Trooper |
| 1976 | "Two for the Show" | 32 | — | Two for the Show |
| 1976 | "Santa Maria" | 35 | — | Two for the Show |
| 1977 | "We're Here for a Good Time (Not a Long Time)" | 43 | — | Knock 'Em Dead Kid |
| 1978 | "Oh, Pretty Lady" | 42 | — | Knock 'Em Dead Kid |
| 1978 | "Raise a Little Hell" | 27 | 59 | Thick as Thieves |
| 1978 | "Round, Round We Go" | 22 | — | Thick as Thieves |
| 1979 | "The Moment That It Takes" | 14 | — | Thick as Thieves |
| 1979 | "The Boys in the Bright White Sports Car" | 25 | — | Hot Shots |
| 1979 | "3 Dressed Up as 9" | 24 | — | Flying Colors |
| 1980 | "Janine" | 7 | — | Flying Colors |
| 1980 | "Good Clean Fun" | 81 | — | Flying Colors |
| 1980 | "Real Canadians" | — | — | Untitled |
| 1980 | "Are You Still My Baby" | — | — | Untitled |
| 1980 | "Laura" | — | — | Untitled |
| 1982 | "Only a Fool" | 44 | — | Money Talks |
| 1982 | "Money Talks" | — | — | Money Talks |
| 1982 | "Ready for the Nite"/"It Comes and It Goes" | — | — | Money Talks |
| 1982 | "Could've Been Me" | — | — | Money Talks |
| 1989 | "Boy with a Beat" | 33 | — | The Last of the Gypsies |
| 1989 | "The Best Way (to Hold a Man)" | 70 | — | The Last of the Gypsies |
| 1989 | "Thin White Line" | — | — | The Last of the Gypsies |
| 1991 | "The American Dream" | 26 | — | Ten |
| 1991 | "Kids in Love" | — | — | Ten |

== See also ==
- Canadian rock
- Music of Canada
- Music of Vancouver
- Category:Canadian rock music groups
- List of Canadian musicians
- List of bands from Canada
- List of bands from British Columbia
