= Untitled (Trooper album) =

Untitled album

Studio album by Trooper
- Released: October 4, 1980
- Genre: Rock, hard rock
- Label: MCA
- Producer: Howard Steele

Trooper chronology
Flying Colors (1979)	Untitled album (1980)	Money Talks (1982)

Professional ratings
Review scores
Source	Rating
Allmusic	link

The untitled sixth studio album by the Canadian rock band Trooper (informally known as Trooper 1980) was released on October 4, 1980. It remains the only Trooper album not to chart a hit single on Canada's RPM 100 Singles chart.

== Track listing ==
(McGuire/Smith)

1. 4:32 - "Don't Feel Like Dancing"
2. 3:32 - "If I Never See Your Face Again"
3. 4:44 - "Are You Still My Baby"
4. 3:37 - "Real Canadians"
5. 3:43 - "Legend"
6. 3:47 - "Dump That Creep"
7. 3:34 - "Laura"
8. 3:57 - "I Don't Wanna Be Here"
9. 5:04 - "Volunteer Victims"

== Band members ==
- Vocals - Ra McGuire
- Guitar - Brian Smith
- Drums - Tommy Stewart
- Bass - Doni Underhill
- Keyboards - Rob Deans

== Singles ==
- "Real Canadians" / "Go Ahead And Sue Me"
- "Laura" / "I Don't Wanna Be Here"
- "Are You Still My Baby" / "Legend"
