= Hot Shots (album) =

Greatest hits album by Trooper

Greatest hits album by Trooper
- Released: 5 March 1979
- Genre: Rock, hard rock
- Length: 41:38
- Label: MCA Records
- Producer: Randy Bachman

Trooper chronology
Thick as Thieves (1978)	Hot Shots (1979)	Flying Colors (1979)

Professional ratings
Review scores
Source	Rating
Allmusic	4/5 stars

Hot Shots is the first greatest hits album by the Canadian rock band Trooper, released in March 1979. The album consists of the band's most popular songs with some modifications. Hot Shots broke all records for Canadian sales of an album by a Canadian act, reaching quadruple-platinum. "The Boys in the Bright White Sports Car" is a slightly different re-recording of a track from the 1976 album Two for the Show.

== Track listing ==
1. 2:59 - "The Boys in the Bright White Sports Car"
2. 3:10 - "Baby Woncha Please Come Home"
3. 3:08 - "General Hand Grenade"
4. 3:30 - "Two for the Show"
5. 3:10 - "Ready"
6. 2:58 - "Santa Maria"
7. 3:32 - "We're Here For a Good Time (Not a Long Time)"
8. 4:35 - "Oh, Pretty Lady"
9. 3:15 - "(It's Been a) Long Time"
10. 4:16 - "Round, Round We Go"
11. 3:21 - "The Moment That It Takes"
12. 3:41 - "Raise a Little Hell"

== Singles ==
- "The Boys In The Bright White Sports Car" / "Waitin' On Your Love"
