= Money Talks (Trooper album) =

Studio album by Trooper
- Released: April 1, 1982
- Genre: Rock, hard rock
- Label: RCA
- Producer: Mike Flicker

Trooper chronology
| Untitled (1980) | Money Talks (1982) | The Last of the Gypsies (1989) |

Professional ratings
Review scores
| Source | Rating |
|---|---|
| AllMusic | 1.5/5 stars |

Money Talks is the seventh studio album by Canadian rock band Trooper, released in 1982.

== Track listing ==
(McGuire/Smith)

1. "Money Talks" 3:37
2. "Only a Fool" 3:09
3. "This Must Be the Place" 4:17
4. "Lookin' for Trouble" 4:04
5. "Ready for the Nite" 3:20
6. "Everything You Want" 3:41
7. "Could've Been Me" 3:23
8. "Any Minute Now" 3:36
9. "It Comes and It Goes" 4:04
10. "Dig a Little Deeper" 3:31 (saxophone : Phil Kenzie)

== Band members ==
- Vocals - Ra McGuire
- Guitar - Brian Smith
- Drums - Tommy Stewart
- Bass - Doni Underhill
- Keyboards - Rob Deans

== Singles ==
- "Money Talks" / "Any Minute Now"
- "Could've Been Me" / "Dig a Little Deeper"
- "Only a Fool" / "Lookin' for Trouble"
- "Ready for the Nite" / "It Comes and It Goes"
- "This Must Be the Place" / "Money Talks"
