= The Last of the Gypsies =

Studio album by Trooper
- Released: May 29, 1989
- Genre: Rock, hard rock
- Label: Great Pacific Records
- Producer: McGuire, Smith

Trooper chronology
Money Talks (1982)	The Last of the Gypsies (1989)	Ten (1991)

The Last of the Gypsies is the eighth studio album by the Canadian rock band Trooper, released in 1989 on the band's self-owned Great Pacific Records label and distributed by Warner Music Canada. It came after a six-year recording absence and was certified Gold in Canada. The album featured the singles "Boy with a Beat", "The Best Way (to Hold a Man)" and "Thin White Line".

== Track listing ==
(McGuire/Smith)

1. 3:48 - "Workin' Like a Dog"
2. 4:02 - "Thin White Line" (McGuire)
3. 3:50 - "The Girl Don't Know"
4. 3:33 - "The Real World"
5. 3:23 - "Don't Like Being Told What to Do"
6. 3:33 - "Boy with a Beat"
7. 3:46 - "The Best Way (to Hold a Man)"
8. 4:12 - "$100,000.00"
9. 3:24 - "Ain't Gonna Swallow My Pride"
10. 4:20 - "The Last of the Gypsies"

== Band members ==
- Vocals - Ra McGuire
- Guitar - Brian Smith
- Drums - Mike Schmidt
- Bass - Larry Church
- Keyboards - Blaine Smith

== Singles ==
- "Boy With A Beat" / "$100,000.00"
- "The Best Way (To Hold A Man)"
- "Thin White Line"
