= Steve Ivings =

Canadian broadcaster and comedian

Steve Ivings (born ca. 1956) is a Canadian broadcaster and comedian. A longtime radio personality in the Victoria, British Columbia market in the 1980s and 1990s, he is most noted for his 1979 comedy album Steve's Album, which was a shortlisted Juno Award nominee for Comedy Album of the Year at the Juno Awards of 1980. The album's best-known track was a parody version of "The Twelve Days of Christmas", done in Ivings' voice impersonations of celebrities such as Dean Martin, Peter Falk, Marlon Brando, Walter Cronkite, Richard Burton, Liberace and Paul Lynde, which was regularly played at Christmastime on the syndicated Dr. Demento show.

In 1986 he collaborated with colleague Scott Dixon on a mock interview with Elvis Presley, in which Ivings as Presley reported on his experience of the afterlife. In 1996, he conducted interviews with several Canadian radio stations in character as George Burns on the occasion of Burns' 100th birthday. In 1998, he released a cover of "To All the Girls I've Loved Before", sung in the voice of Bill Clinton.

He was bumped from his on-air role with CFAX in 1999, although he remained an employee in the station's production department, and returned to performing as an impressionist in comedy clubs. He has also written and directed comedy and musical theatre productions.
