= Thick as Thieves (Trooper album) =

Studio album by Trooper
- Released: June 19, 1978
- Genres: Rock, hard rock
- Length: 38:34
- Label: MCA
- Producer: Randy Bachman

Trooper chronology
Knock 'Em Dead Kid (1977)	Thick as Thieves (1978)	Hot Shots (1979)

Professional ratings
Review scores
Source	Rating
AllMusic	3.5/5 stars

Thick as Thieves is the fourth studio album by Canadian rock band Trooper, released in 1978. The album was the fourth in a row to be produced by Randy Bachman of Bachman–Turner Overdrive and the Guess Who fame, but it was also the last one he produced for the band. The album went platinum in their home country, and featured the group's only successful U.S. single, "Raise a Little Hell".

== Overview ==
Thick as Thieves contained the hits “Raise a Little Hell”, "Round, Round We Go" written and sung by keyboardist Frank Ludwig, and "The Moment That it Takes" written by Stewart and Underhill and also sung by Ludwig.

== Track listing ==
All songs written by Ra McGuire and Brian Smith unless otherwise noted.

1. "Live from the Moon" (4:14)
2. "No Fun Being Alone" (3:17)
3. "Round, Round We Go" (4:18) (Frank Ludwig)
4. "Drivin' Crazy" (3:19)
5. "Roll with It" (4:09)
6. "Say Goodnight" (3:51)
7. "The Moment That It Takes" (3:19) (Tommy Stewart/Doni Underhill)
8. "One Good Reason" (5:14)
9. "Gambler" (3:18)
10. "Raise a Little Hell" (3:41)

CD bonus track

11. "A Fine Mess (You've Gotten Us Into)" [b-side to Raise A Little Hell single]

== Personnel ==
- Ra McGuire – lead vocals
- Brian Smith – lead guitar, vocals
- Tommy Stewart – drums, vocals
- Doni Underhill – bass guitar, vocals
- Frank Ludwig – keyboards, vocals, lead vocals on "Round, Round We Go" and "The Moment That It Takes"

== Singles ==
- "Raise a Little Hell" / "A Fine Mess (You've Gotten Us Into)"
- "Round, Round We Go" / "Raise a Little Hell"
- "The Moment That It Takes" / "Live from the Moon"
