= Ten (Trooper album) =

TEN

Studio album by Trooper
- Released: June 5, 1991
- Genre: Rock, hard rock
- Label: Great Pacific Records
- Producer: McGuire-Smith

Trooper chronology
The Last of the Gypsies (1989)	TEN (1991)	Hits from 10 Albums (2010)

TEN is the ninth studio album by the Canadian rock band Trooper, released in 1991, containing the hit "American Dream". The album reached No. 52 on the Canadian Albums Chart. As of 2026, it is the group's most recent studio album.

== Track listing ==
(McGuire/Smith)

1. 3:43 - "The American Dream"
2. 4:09 - "Too Much, Too Easy"
3. 2:53 - "Simple Thing"
4. 4:22 - "Kids in Love"
5. 4:06 - "What Day Is This?"
6. 4:07 - "Don't Let Nothin' Bring You Down"
7. 3:44 - "True Love"
8. 3:43 - "Fight for Freedom"
9. 4:02 - "Stop Thinkin'"
10. 4:14 - "What the Hell's Goin' On?"

== Band members ==
- Vocals - Ra McGuire
- Guitar - Brian Smith
- Drums - John Stoltz
- Bass - Larry Church
- Keyboards - Blaine Smith

== Singles ==
- "The American Dream"
- "Kids In Love"
