= Flying Colors (Trooper album) =

Studio album by Trooper
- Released: 4 September 1979
- Genres: Rock, hard rock
- Length: 41:38
- Label: MCA
- Producer: Howard Steele

Trooper chronology
Hot Shots (1979)	Flying Colors (1979)	Untitled (1980)

Professional ratings
Review scores
Source	Rating
AllMusic	1.5/5 stars

Flying Colours is the fifth studio album by the Canadian rock band Trooper, released in 1979. The album contained the hits "3 Dressed Up as a Nine", "Good Clean Fun" and "Janine", the latter of which became the band's highest charting single in their career history. The album would reach platinum certification in Canada. The album cover design was by James O'Mara and David Sharpe. Trooper supported the album with a Canadian tour.

== Track listing ==
All songs by McGuire/Smith except where noted.

Side one

1. "3 Dressed Up as a 9" (4:41)
2. “Good Clean Fun” (4:45)
3. "All Day and All the Night" (Ray Davies) (3:08)
4. “Go Ahead and Sue Me” (4:21)
5. "Drive Away" (3:41)

Side two

1. "Mr Big" (Stewart/Underhill/Ludwig) (3:21)
2. "Janine" (4:09)
3. “Quiet Desperation” (4:26)
4. “Back to You” (4:11)
5. She’s So Sweet (3:32)

== Band members ==
- Ra McGuire - vocals
- Brian Smith - guitar, background vocals
- Frank Ludwig - keyboards, lead vocals on "Quiet Desperation," "Mr. Big" & "Back to You"
- Tommy Stewart - drums, percussion, background vocals
- Doni Underhill - bass, background vocals

Guest musicians

- Steve Porcaro - [keyboards]
- Steve Lukather - [guitar]
- Joe Lala - [drums]
- Harold Cowart - [bass]
- [Sandra] Rhodes, [Charles] Chalmers & [Donna] Rhodes - [background vocals]

== Singles ==
- "3 Dressed Up as a 9" / "Mr. Big" (No. 24 CAN)
- "Janine" / "Live from the Moon" (No. 7 CAN)
- "Good Clean Fun" / "(It's Been A) Long Time" (No. 81 CAN)

== Charts ==
=== Weekly charts ===
Chart (1979)	Peak position
Canada Top Albums/CDs (RPM)	11

=== Year-end charts ===
Chart (1980)	Peak position
Canada Top Albums/CDs (RPM)	28

== Certifications ==
In 1979, the album was certified platinum by Music Canada.
