= Scott Brown (bassist) =

Canadian bassist

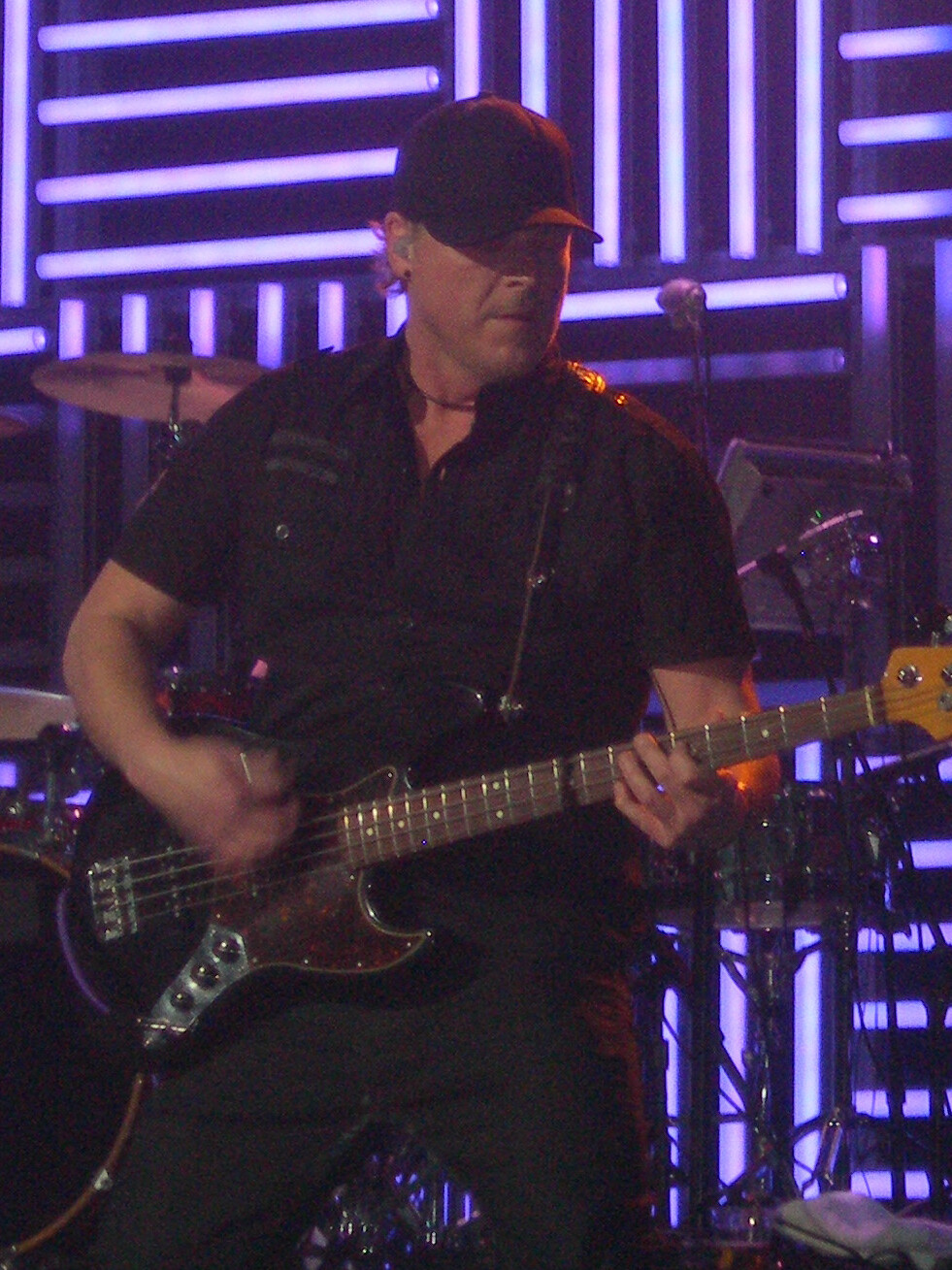
- Scott Brown performing with Trooper at the Vancouver 2010 Olympic Victory Ceremonies

Background information
- Birth name: Scott George Brown
- Born: October 6, 1964 (age 60)
- Genres: Rock, pop
- Occupation: Musician
- Instrument: Bass
- Member of: Trooper
- Website: sgeorgebrown.com/index.php

Scott George Brown (born October 6, 1964) is a Canadian bassist who is a member of the rock band Trooper. He has also worked with vocalist Paul Laine, both as a solo artist and with Danger Danger.

Brown joined Trooper in 1996 and has toured with the band ever since, making him one of the longest-running members in the band's history. Scott, along with the band Trooper performed at the 1997 Grey Cup Halftime show in Commonwealth Stadium, Edmonton Alberta. Brown was also featured when Trooper performed in the 2010 Olympics Victory Ceremonies in Vancouver, British Columbia, on February 21, 2010. Coverage of the event was broadcast in Canada and around the world on networks such as CTV and MuchMusic.

In May 2023, Trooper was inducted into the Canadian Music Hall of Fame and Brown received the Juno statuette as one of the inducted members.

Brown currently resides on Vancouver Island, and continues to perform with Trooper. When he is not touring with Trooper, he performs solo and duo acoustic shows on Vancouver Island and throughout the lower mainland.

Preceded by Bruno Ravel	Danger Danger bassist ?	Succeeded by Bruno Ravel
