= Canadian Music Hall of Fame =

Hall of fame for musicians

- Established: 1978
- Location: National Music Centre, Calgary, Alberta
- Founder: Canadian Academy of Recording Arts and Sciences
- Website: canadianmusichalloffame.ca

The Canadian Music Hall of Fame was established in 1978 by the Canadian Academy of Recording Arts and Sciences (CARAS) to honour Canadian musicians for their lifetime achievements in music. The award presentation is held each year as part of the Juno Award ceremonies. Since 2012, the inductee also performs at the ceremony.

A hall facility was opened in Calgary in 2016 located within The National Music Centre in Calgary, Alberta. It can be found on level five of the Studio Bell, a floor entirely dedicated to celebrating and recognizing Canadian music creators and artists who have left their mark on this country and beyond.

== Inductees ==
As of 2027 CARAS has honored 73 bands or individual musicians. To date, Randy Bachman and Burton Cummings are the only artists to be inducted twice, once for their work with The Guess Who and again for Bachman's work with Bachman–Turner Overdrive and Cummings for his solo work.

=== 2026 ===
Inductee	Birthdate	Deathdate	Occupation	Genre
Nelly Furtado	2 December 1978	-	Singer-songwriter, actress	Pop, worldbeat, Latin, R&B

=== 2025 ===
Inductee	Birthdate	Deathdate	Occupation	Genre
Sum 41	Deryck Whibley (21 March 1980) Steve Jocz (July 23 1981) Dave Baksh (July 26 1980) Jason McCaslin (September 3 1980) Tom Thacker (April 11 1974) Frank Zummo (July 2 1978)	-	Rock band	Pop-punk, skate punk, melodic hardcore, alternative rock
Loreena McKennitt	17 February 1957	-	Singer-songwriter	Celtic fusion
Dan Hill	3 June 1954	-	Singer-songwriter	Soft rock
Glass Tiger		-	Rock band	Soft rock, pop rock
Ginette Reno	28 April 1946	-	Singer	Pop music

=== 2024 ===
Inductee	Birthdate	Deathdate	Occupation	Genre
Maestro Fresh Wes	March 31, 1968		Rapper	Hip-hop

=== 2023 ===
Inductee	Birthdate	Deathdate	Occupation	Genre
Nickelback	Mike Kroeger (25 Jun 1972); Ryan Vikedal (9 May 1975); Brandon Kroeger (30 November 1971); Ryan Peake (1 March 1973); Chad Kroeger (15 November 1974); Daniel Adair (19 February 1975); Mitch Guindon	-	Rock band	Post-grunge, hard rock, pop rock, alternative metal, alternative rock
Trooper	Ra McGuire (13 Jun 1950); Brian Smith (26 March 1949); Tommy Stewart (15 July 1952); Harry Kalensky (3 February 1950); Frank Ludwig (23 December 1947); Doni Underhill (13 April 1949); Rob Deans (16 April 1950); Gogo (24 April 1965); Scott Brown (6 October 1964); Clayton Hill (29 October 1965)	-	Rock band	Rock, pop
Terri Clark	5 August 1968	-	Singer-songwriter	Country
Oliver Jones	11 September 1934	-	Pianist	Jazz
Diane Dufresne	30 September 1944	-	Singer, painter	Chanson, rock, pop

=== 2022 ===
Inductee	Birthdate	Deathdate	Occupation	Genre
Deborah Cox	13 July 1974	-	Singer-songwriter, actress, producer	R&B, soul, pop, dance, jazz

=== 2021 ===
Inductee	Birthdate	Deathdate	Occupation	Genre
Jann Arden	27 March 1962	-	Singer-songwriter, actress	Pop

=== 2019 ===
Inductee	Birthdate	Deathdate	Occupation	Genre
Corey Hart	31 May 1962	-	Singer-songwriter, record producer	Pop rock
Andy Kim	5 December 1946	-	Singer-songwriter	Pop, rock
Bobby Curtola	17 April 1943	4 June 2016	Singer-songwriter	Rock and roll
Chilliwack	Bill Henderson (6 November 1944); Ed Henderson; Jerry Adolphe	- - -	Band	Progressive rock
Cowboy Junkies	Margo Timmins (27 January 1961); Michael Timmins (21 April 1959); Peter Timmins (29 October 1965); Alan Anton (22 June 1959)	- - - -	Band	Alternative country, folk rock

=== 2018 ===
Inductee	Birthdate	Deathdate	Occupation	Genre
Barenaked Ladies	Ed Robertson (25 October 1970); Jim Creeggan (12 February 1970); Tyler Stewart (21 September 1967); Kevin Hearn (2 July 1969)	- - - -	Band	Alternative rock, jangle pop, comedy rock, pop rock
Steven Page	22 June 1970	-	Songwriter, musician	Rock, folk rock, alternative rock

=== 2017 ===
Inductee	Birthdate	Deathdate	Occupation	Genre
Sarah McLachlan	28 January 1968	-	Singer-songwriter, musician	Adult contemporary, pop

=== 2016 ===
Inductee	Birthdate	Deathdate	Occupation	Genre
Burton Cummings	31 December 1947	-	Singer-songwriter, musician	Rock, soft rock

=== 2015 ===
Inductee	Birthdate	Deathdate	Occupation	Genre
Alanis Morissette	1 June 1974	-	Singer-songwriter, musician, actress	Alternative rock, pop rock, grunge

=== 2014 ===
Inductee	Birthdate	Deathdate	Occupation	Genre
Bachman-Turner Overdrive	Randy Bachman (27 September 1943); Robbie Bachman (18 February 1953); Fred Turner (16 October 1943)	- (12 January 2023) -	Band	Rock, blues rock

=== 2013 ===
Inductee	Birthdate	Deathdate	Occupation	Genre
k.d. lang	2 November 1961	-	Singer-songwriter, actress	Country, pop

=== 2012 ===
Inductee	Birthdate	Deathdate	Occupation	Genre
Blue Rodeo	Jim Cuddy (2 December 1955); Greg Keelor (29 August 1954); Bazil Donovan (29 April 1955); Glenn Milchem; Bob Egan; Mike Boguski	- - - - -	Band	Country rock, pop rock

=== 2011 ===
Inductee	Birthdate	Deathdate	Occupation	Genre
Shania Twain	28 August 1965	-	Singer-songwriter	Country, country pop

=== 2010 ===
Inductee	Birthdate	Deathdate	Occupation	Genre
April Wine	Myles Goodwyn (23 June 1948); Brian Greenway (1 October 1951); Ritchie Henman; Jimmy Henman; Jerry Mercer (27 April 1939)	December 3, 2023 - - - -	Band	Hard rock

=== 2009 ===
Inductee	Birthdate	Deathdate	Occupation	Genre
Loverboy	Mike Reno (8 January 1955); Paul Dean (9 February 1946); Scott Smith (13 February 1955); Matt Frenette (7 March 1954); Doug Johnson (19 December 1957); Ken Sinnaeve (2 May 1955)	- - 30 November 2000 - - -	Band	Hard rock, synth-rock

=== 2008 ===
Inductee	Birthdate	Deathdate	Occupation	Genre
Triumph	Rik Emmett (10 July 1953); Mike Levine (1 June 1949); Gil Moore (12 February 1953)	-	Band	Hard rock, heavy metal, progressive rock

=== 2007 ===
Inductee	Birthdate	Deathdate	Occupation	Genre
Bob Rock	19 April 1954	-	Sound engineer, record producer, musician	Rock, heavy metal, punk rock

=== 2006 ===
Inductee	Birthdate	Deathdate	Occupation	Genre
Bryan Adams	5 November 1959	-	Singer-songwriter, guitarist	Rock, pop rock, soft rock

=== 2005 ===
Inductee	Birthdate	Deathdate	Occupation	Genre
The Tragically Hip	Gord Downie (6 February 1964); Rob Baker (12 April 1962); Paul Langlois (23 August 1964); Gord Sinclair; Johnny Fay (7 July 1966)	17 October 2017 - - - -	Band	Rock

=== 2004 ===
Inductee	Birthdate	Deathdate	Occupation	Genre
Bob Ezrin	25 March 1949	-	Producer, keyboardist	Rock

=== 2003 ===
Inductee	Birthdate	Deathdate	Occupation	Genre
Tom Cochrane	14 May 1953	-	Musician	Hard rock, heartland rock

=== 2002 ===
Inductee	Birthdate	Deathdate	Occupation	Genre
Daniel Lanois	19 September 1951	-	Record producer, songwriter, guitarist	Alternative rock

=== 2001 ===
Inductee	Birthdate	Deathdate	Occupation	Genre
Bruce Cockburn	27 May 1945	-	Singer-songwriter, guitarist	Folk rock

=== 2000 ===
Inductee	Birthdate	Deathdate	Occupation	Genre
Bruce Fairbairn	30 December 1949	17 May 1999	Record producer, musician	Rock

=== 1999 ===
Inductee	Birthdate	Deathdate	Occupation	Genre
Luc Plamondon	2 March 1942	-	Songwriter, music executive	Musical theater

=== 1998 ===
Inductee	Birthdate	Deathdate	Occupation	Genre
David Foster	1 November 1949	-	Musician, arranger, record producer, music executive	Classical, pop, rock, gospel, R&B, jazz

=== 1997 ===
Inductee	Birthdate	Deathdate	Occupation	Genre
Gil Evans	13 May 1912	20 March 1988	Pianist, composer, arranger, bandleader	Jazz
Lenny Breau	5 August 1941	12 August 1984	Guitarist, educator	Jazz, country
Maynard Ferguson	4 May 1928	23 August 2006	Trumpeter	Jazz, jazz rock
Moe Koffman	28 December 1928	1 May 2010	Saxophonist, flautist, composer, arranger	Jazz
Rob McConnell	14 February 1935	28 March 2001	Trombonist, composer, arranger	Jazz

=== 1996 ===
Inductee	Birthdate	Deathdate	Occupation	Genre
David Clayton-Thomas	13 September 1941	24 June 2026	Singer-songwriter, musician	R&B, rock, funk, pop, jazz
Denny Doherty	29 November 1940	19 January 2007	Singer-songwriter, actor	Folk, pop
John Kay	12 April 1944	-	Singer, guitarist	Rock, psychedelic, blues
Domenic Troiano	17 January 1946	25 May 2005	Guitarist	Rock
Zal Yanovsky	19 December 1944	13 December 2002	Musician	Folk rock

=== 1995 ===
Inductee	Birthdate	Deathdate	Occupation	Genre
Buffy Sainte-Marie (rescinded in 2025)	20 February 1941	-	Singer-songwriter, composer, musician, activist, visual artist, educator	Country folk, First Nations, rock, Americana

=== 1994 ===
Inductee	Birthdate	Deathdate	Occupation	Genre
Rush	Geddy Lee (29 July 1953); Alex Lifeson (27 August 1953); Neil Peart (12 September 1952)	- - 7 January 2020	Band	Progressive rock, heavy metal, hard rock

=== 1993 ===
Inductee	Birthdate	Deathdate	Occupation	Genre
Anne Murray	20 June 1945	-	Singer	Country, pop, adult contemporary

=== 1992 ===
Inductee	Birthdate	Deathdate	Occupation	Genre
Ian & Sylvia	Ian Tyson (25 September 1933); Sylvia Tyson (19 September 1940)	29 December 2022 -	Vocal duo	Folk, country rock

=== 1991 ===
Inductee	Birthdate	Deathdate	Occupation	Genre
Leonard Cohen	21 September 1934	7 November 2016	Singer-songwriter, poet, novelist	Folk, soft rock

=== 1990 ===
Inductee	Birthdate	Deathdate	Occupation	Genre
Maureen Forrester	25 July 1930	16 June 2010	Operatic contralto	Opera, classical

=== 1989 ===
Inductee	Birthdate	Deathdate	Occupation	Genre
The Band	Rick Danko (29 December 1942); Garth Hudson (2 August 1937); Richard Manuel (3 April 1943); Robbie Robertson (5 July 1943); Levon Helm (26 May 1940)	10 December 1999; 21 January 2025; 4 March 1986; 9 August 2023; 19 April 2012	Band	Roots rock, Americana, country rock, folk rock

=== 1987 ===
Inductee	Birthdate	Deathdate	Occupation	Genre
The Guess Who	Randy Bachman (27 September 1943); Burton Cummings (31 December 1947); Jim Kale (11 August 1943); Garry Peterson (26 May 1945)	-	Band	Rock, psychedelic rock, pop rock

=== 1986 ===
Inductee	Birthdate	Deathdate	Occupation	Genre
Gordon Lightfoot	17 November 1938	1 May 2023	Singer-songwriter, guitarist	Folk, pop, folk rock, country

=== 1985 ===
Inductee	Birthdate	Deathdate	Occupation	Genre
Wilf Carter	18 December 1904	5 December 1996	Singer-songwriter, guitarist, yodeller	Country western

=== 1984 ===
Inductee	Birthdate	Deathdate	Occupation	Genre
The Crew-Cuts	Rudi Magueri (27 January 1931); John Perkins (28 August 1931); Ray Perkins (24 November 1932); Pat Barrett (15 September 1933)	7 May 2004 - - 27 July 2016	Vocal group	Traditional pop, doo-wop, big band
The Diamonds	Dave Somerville (2 October 1933); Ted Kowalski; Phil Levitt; Bill Reed	14 July 2015; 8 August 2010 - 22 October 2004	Vocal group	Rhythm and blues, traditional pop
The Four Lads	Jimmy Arnold (4 January 1932); Frank Busseri (10 October 1932); Corrado Codarini (11 February 1930); Bernie Toorish (2 March 1931)	15 June 2004; 28 January 2019; 28 April 2010 -	Vocal group	Traditional pop

=== 1983 ===
Inductee	Birthdate	Deathdate	Occupation	Genre
Glenn Gould	25 September 1932	4 October 1982	Pianist	Classical

=== 1982 ===
Inductee	Birthdate	Deathdate	Occupation	Genre
Neil Young	12 November 1945	-	Singer-songwriter, musician, activist	Rock, folk rock, country rock, blues rock, experimental

=== 1981 ===
Inductee	Birthdate	Deathdate	Occupation	Genre
Joni Mitchell	7 November 1943	-	Singer-songwriter, Musician, Painter	Folk, jazz, pop, rock

=== 1980 ===
Inductee	Birthdate	Deathdate	Occupation	Genre
Paul Anka	30 July 1941	-	Singer-songwriter, actor	Pop, soft rock, jazz, doo-wop, swing, rock and roll

=== 1979 ===
Inductee	Birthdate	Deathdate	Occupation	Genre
Hank Snow	9 May 1914	20 December 1999	Singer-songwriter, musician	Country

=== 1978 ===
Inductee	Birthdate	Deathdate	Occupation	Genre
Guy Lombardo	19 June 1902	5 November 1977	Bandleader, violinist, hydroplane racer	Jazz, big band, traditional pop
Oscar Peterson	15 August 1925	23 December 2007	Pianist, composer	Jazz, classical

== See also ==
- Music of Canada
- List of music museums
