= Canada's Walk of Fame =

Walk of Fame in Ontario, Canada

Canada's Walk of Fame French: Allée des célébrités canadiennes

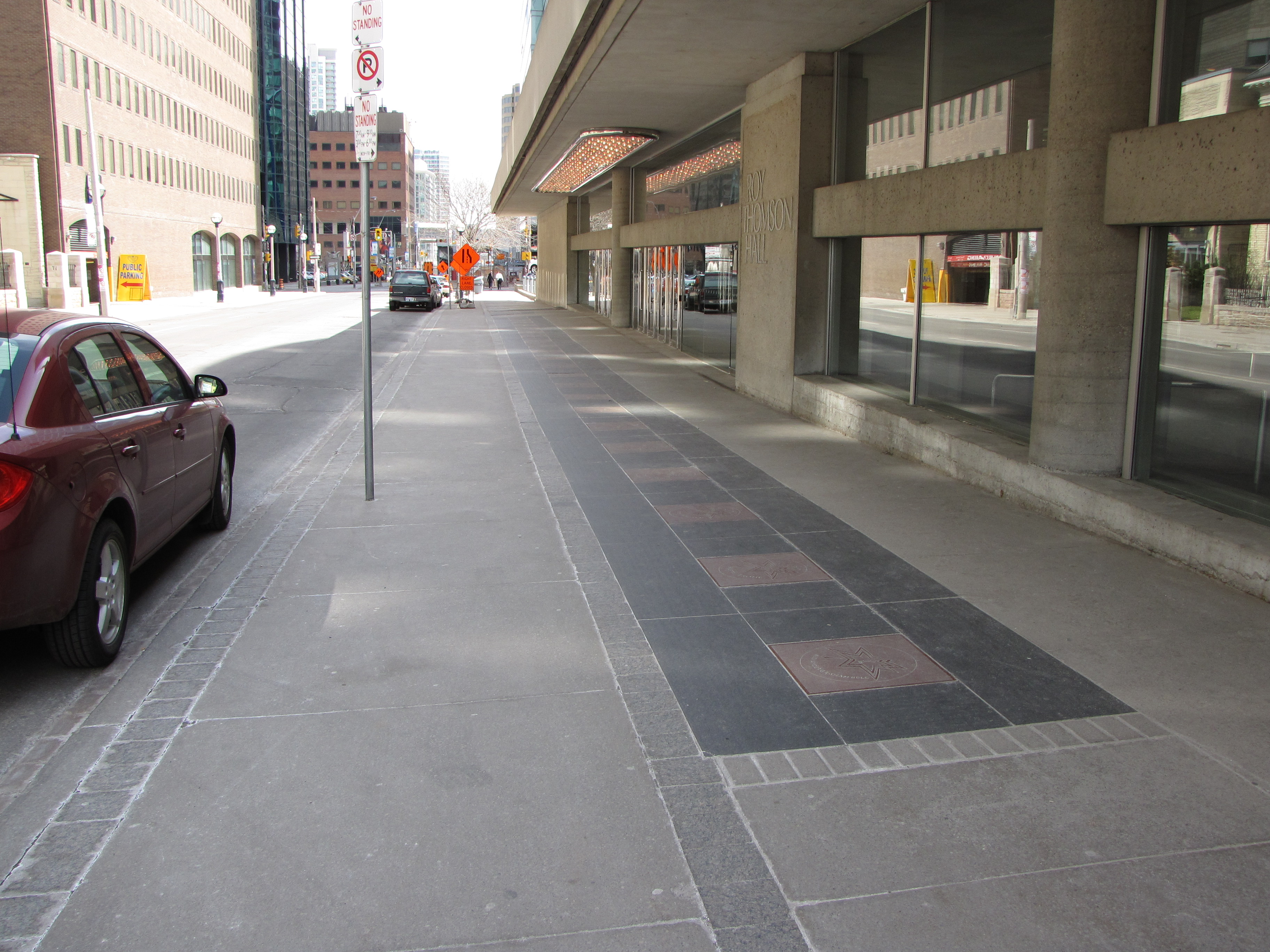
- A line of stars along Simcoe Street
- Established: 1998
- Location: 18 Gloucester Lane; 3rd Floor; Toronto, Ontario; M4Y 1L5
- Coordinates: 43.6471°N 79.38705°W
- Type: Walk of fame
- Founder: Peter Soumalias (co-founder)
- Website: www.canadaswalkoffame.com
- Inductees: 237

Canada's Walk of Fame (French: Allée des célébrités canadiennes) in Toronto, Ontario, Canada, is a walk of fame that acknowledges the achievements and accomplishments of Canadians who have excelled in their respective fields. It is a series of maple leaf-like stars embedded in 13 designated blocks' worth of sidewalks in Toronto in front of Roy Thomson Hall, The Princess of Wales Theatre, and The Royal Alexandra Theatre on King Street as well as Simcoe Street.

The first group was inducted in 1998, and it as of September 5, 2026 includes 237 Canadian activists, scientists, philanthropists, athletes, coaches, actors, directors, writers, producers, musicians, comedians, cartoonists, models and others.

== History ==
The Walk of Fame was conceived in 1996 when co-founder Peter Soumalias suggested the idea of a Walk of Fame for famous Torontonians to the board of the Toronto Entertainment District Association. They rejected his idea, but he went on to establish a Walk of Fame for Canadians in partnership with Bill Ballard, Dusty Cohl and Gary Slaight. In spite of a lack of funds and research, and no media plan, the first class of inductees was inducted in 1998. Canada's Walk of Fame has become a popular tourist attraction in Toronto, and has been named the number one Canadian recognition event.

== Induction ==
=== Process ===
Canada's Walk of Fame has five categories:

- Arts & Entertainment
- Business & Entrepreneurship
- Philanthropy & Humanities
- Science & Technology
- Sports & Athletics

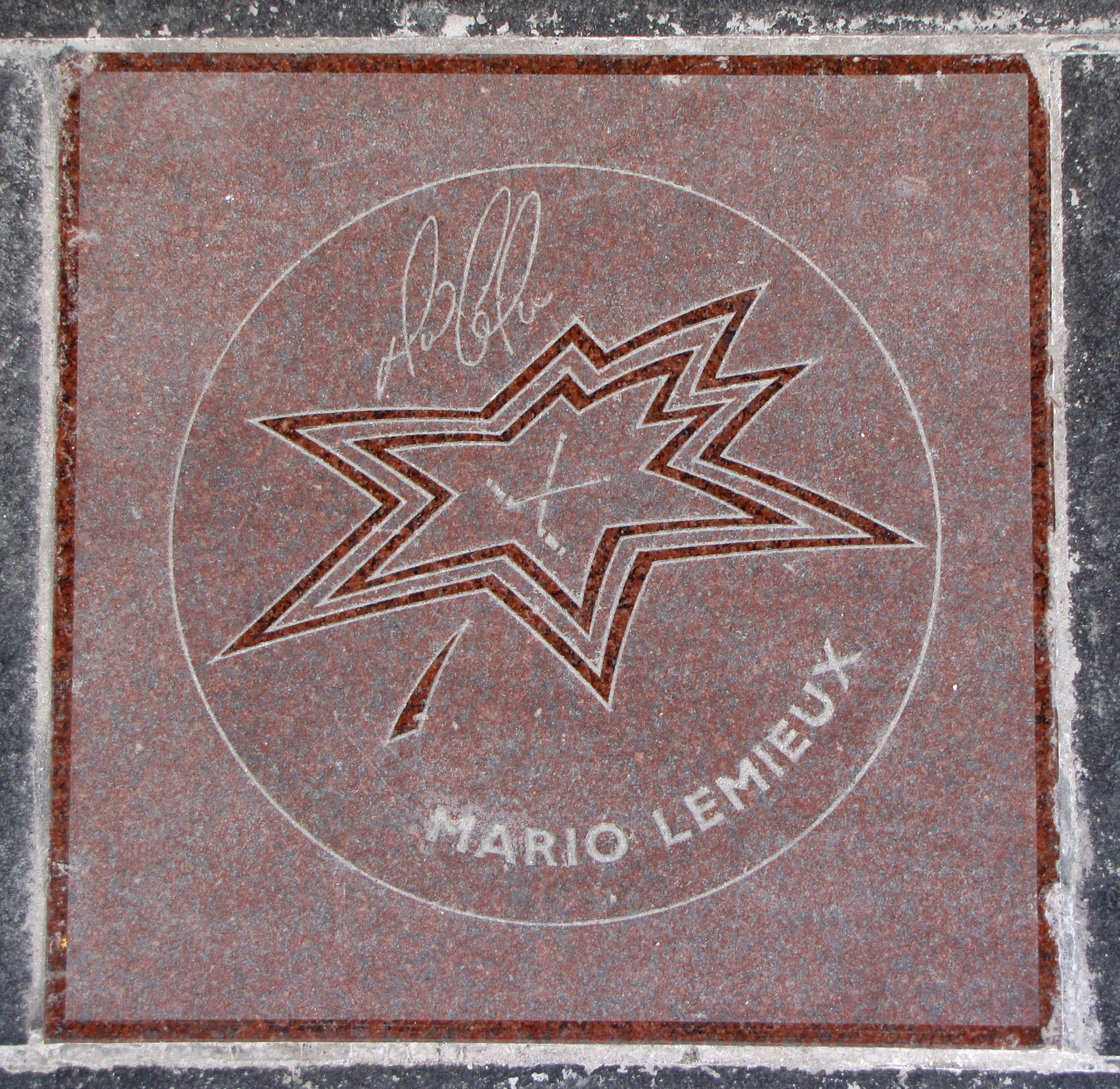
Star for Mario Lemieux

Nominations for potential inductees are accepted from the public year-round, culminating with their National Nomination Promotion during the month of April. In 2000, prior to the introduction of the online voting system, over 30,000 nominations were received via letters, fax and e-mail. Now submissions are accepted on the official Canada's Walk of Fame website and thousands of nominations are received every year, which are then sent to selection committee for consideration.

The committee then analyzes the nominees based on the following criteria: the nominee was born in Canada or has spent their formative or creative years in Canada; they have had a minimum of ten years experience in their field; they have had a national or international impact on Canada's Cultural heritage. Following the Selection Committee's evaluation, the nominees that meet all of the requirements are forwarded to the board of directors, who then select the inductees.

=== Ceremony ===
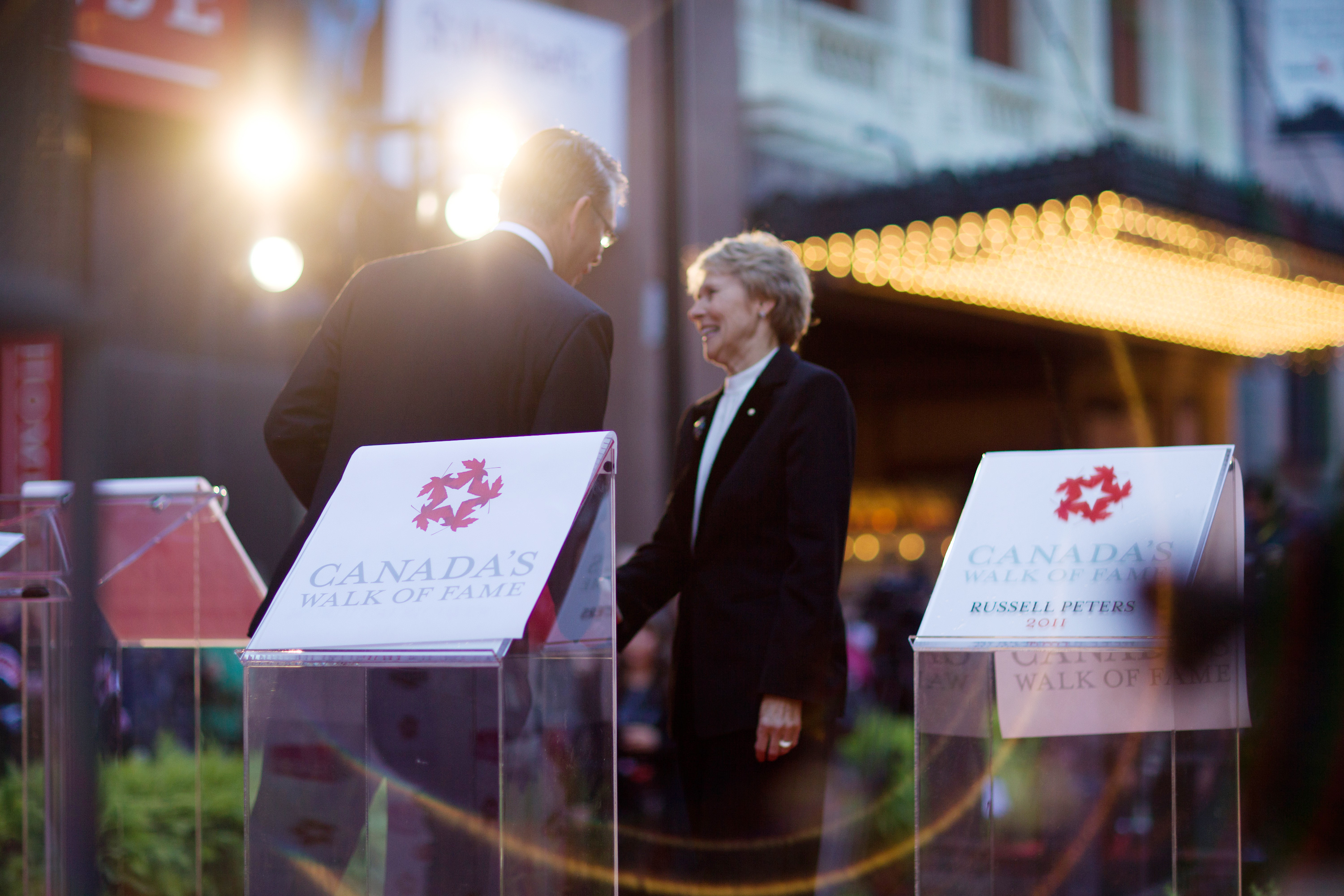
Roberta Bondar receiving her star during the 2011 induction ceremony

New inductees are inducted annually at an unveiling ceremony where their star, a stylized maple leaf, is revealed. The first was held in 1998 and only four of the twelve living inductees attended: Karen Kain, Norman Jewison, Barbara Ann Scott and Rich Little. The 2007 ceremony was held at Toronto's Hummingbird Centre, was attended by all seven inductees and was hosted by Eugene Levy.

Past hosts include Trish Stratus, Tom Green, Jann Arden, Kurt Browning and Catriona Le May Doan. The ceremony was broadcast by CTV until 2008. Beginning in 2009 the ceremony was broadcast by Global. The first ceremony on the network was hosted by Anne Murray while Howie Mandel hosted for the following two years. Paul Shaffer hosted the event in 2012.

== Awards ==
=== Cineplex Legends Award ===
Established in 2008, the Cineplex Legends Award is posthumously awarded to "Canadian pioneers in film, music, sport, arts, and innovation." Sponsored by Cineplex Entertainment, the first recipients of the award were siblings Norma and Douglas Shearer. The award recipients are also given stars on the Walk of Fame.

=== Allan Slaight Honour ===
First awarded in 2010, the Allan Slaight Honour, named after the leading figure in the Canadian radio industry, is awarded to a young Canadian for "making a positive impact in the fields of music." Recipients receive an honorarium of $10,000 from the Slaight Foundation, but are not considered inductees of the Walk of Fame. So far, recipients of the Slaight award have been Nikki Yanofsky, Drake, Melanie Fiona, Carly Rae Jepsen, the Weeknd, Shawn Mendes, Brett Kissel, Shawn Hook, Jessie Reyez and Alessia Cara.

=== RBC Emerging Artist Music Mentorship Prize ===
In 2012, in partnership with RBC, Canada's Walk of Fame created the RBC Emerging Artist Music Mentorship Prize. Valued at more than $100,000, it aims to support young Canadian musicians who submit a one-minute musical audio or audiovisual performance for a chance to win $25,000 cash, recording time, performance opportunities and more.

== Festival ==
Canada's Walk of Fame Festival was established in 2010. It spans three days, culminating with the Canada's Walk of Fame Awards Show. It has included performances from Canadian musicians such as Sarah McLachlan, Serena Ryder, Crystal Shawanda, Tom Cochrane and Melanie Fiona. It has also screened Canadian films and comedy acts.

== Criticism ==
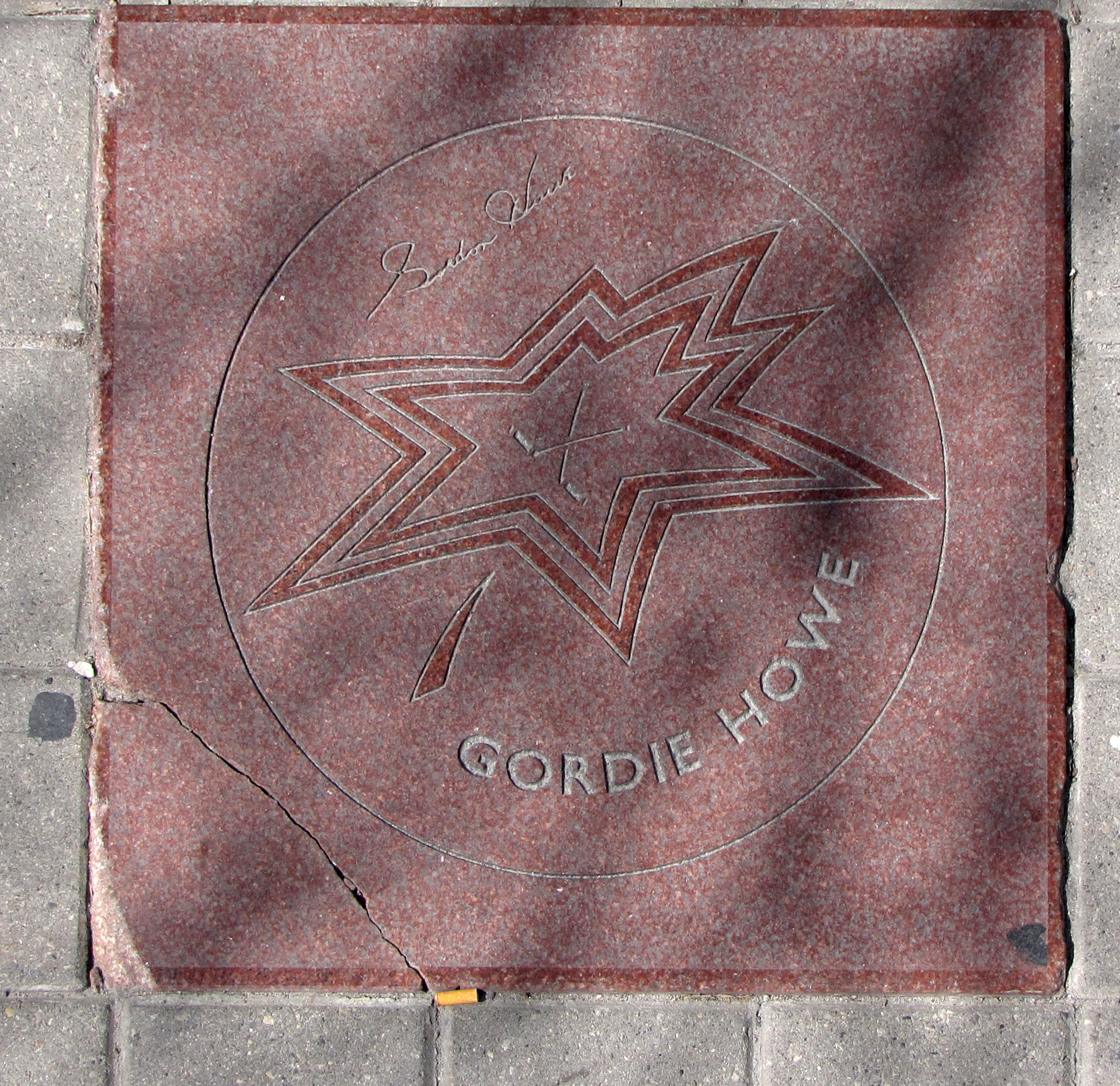
Gordie Howe's star on the Walk of Fame as of April 2009. Damage can be seen on the bottom left corner.

In 1998, Laurie Brown of the CBC criticized the Walk of Fame, calling it "just an attraction to lure tourists to theatres in the area." She claimed that it would only honour Canadians with international impact, saying "if it was truly for Canadians, then I think there would be more of a national bend to the whole thing. But I doubt I'm going to see a star on the Walk of Fame that is only a known-name here in Canada."

In September 2010, William Shatner commented on Twitter regarding damage to his star on the Walk of Fame: "I hear my star on the Canadian Walk of Fame is a bit frazzled ... but, then again, so am I. I wonder if anybody hovering around that area can tell me what's wrong with it and what needs fixing." The family of Gordie Howe also commented on the damage to his star. The Canadian Press reported that "A number of celebrities' stars are looking a bit rough around the edges." The president of the Walk of Fame stated that damage was due to the freezing and thawing during Canadian winters and also sidewalk snowplows. It was announced that the city of Toronto would replace Shatner and Howe's damaged tiles, and the Walk of Fame was looking into an alternative to installing the plaques on a sidewalk where they are subjected to harsh environmental conditions.

== See also ==
- List of Canadian awards
- Persons of National Historic Significance
- Canada: A People's History
- Canadian Newsmaker of the Year
- Heritage Minutes
- List of Canadian Victoria Cross recipients
- List of companions of the Order of Canada
