= Brian Smith (Canadian musician) =

British–Canadian guitarist (born 1949)

Brian "Smitty" Smith
- Born: Brian William Smith; March 26, 1949 (age 77); London, England
- Genres: Rock, pop
- Occupation: Musician
- Instrument: Guitar
- Years active: 1967–present
- Formerly of: Trooper

Brian William Smith (born March 26, 1949) is a British–Canadian guitarist, known for being a founding member of the rock band Trooper.

== Life and career ==
=== Early life ===
Smith was born in London and emigrated to Canada in 1951.

Smith began performing on the guitar before he was fifteen years old. Some of his first gigs were playing with Don Geppert and Anne Attenborough in a band that played Hawaiian music. Within only one year, he was showing promise on the guitar. Smith graduated from Vancouver City College with a degree in Arts and Merchandising, but his love of music led him along another route. He is known as a guitarist and also as a co-writer of more than 100 songs, many of which have become hits.

=== Career ===
Smith has performed with Trooper along with Ra McGuire since 1975, when their first album was released, until their 2021 retirement. He currently resides in Langley, BC.

At the 1999 SOCAN Awards, Smith and songwriting partner Ra McGuire received SOCAN Classic Awards for "We're Here for a Good Time" and "Santa Maria", presented for songs that have received over 100,000 documented radio plays.

Smith received a third SOCAN Classic Award in 2005, for "Oh, Pretty Lady."

Smith and Trooper continued to tour and perform across Canada. As part of the Vancouver 2010 Winter Olympics festivities, Smith was featured when Trooper performed on February 21, 2010. Coverage of the event was broadcast in Canada and around the world on networks such as CTV and MuchMusic.

On November 19, 2012, Smith was presented with a SOCAN National Achievement Award, which is presented to artists who have had outstanding success, predominantly in the Canadian music industry, over the span of their career. He also received three SOCAN Classic Awards for "Raise A Little Hell", "General Hand Grenade", and "Janine", co-written with songwriting partner Ra McGuire. He was also nominated for the Composer of the year Juno award several times.

In May 2023, Trooper was inducted into the Canadian Music Hall of Fame and Smith received the Juno statuette as one of the inducted members.

=== Personal life ===
Brian and his wife Joanne have been married for 55 years together, he is three times grandfather and his granddaughters have inspired him to stay healthy and to continue creating.

=== Retirement ===
Quoted from their official Facebook group, as of November 8, 2021, the final two founding members are retiring:

We have some news. Ra and Smitty are officially retiring. They've already been *unofficially* retired for a year and a half, so they've just decided to continue not working, since they've realized that they're getting pretty good at it. They are both healthy and happy, they've just decided that this is the best time to step back from the road and enjoy the life that this unplanned time-off has dropped them into. It's been a difficult decision and today marks a bittersweet and emotional turning point in their lives. They send their love to all their fans, friends, and everyone with whom they've shared the joyous, rockin', love-filled cross-Canada party that is Trooper. They will sorely miss you all. BUT HOLD ON ... If you've been looking forward to the next Trooper show, don't despair. Ra and Smitty have given their blessing to the rest of the band and crew to carry on as Trooper without them! More on this soon.

== Instrument collection ==
Smith has a large collection of vintage guitars, including the following:

- Fender Stratocaster
- 1974 Gibson Les Paul, which Smith played consistently throughout his career with Trooper.
- A Gretsch Guitar, formerly owned and played by Randy Bachman of Bachman–Turner Overdrive and The Guess Who. This guitar was also used for the guitar riff at the end of the Trooper hit "Round Round We Go".
- A Bill Lewis handbuilt guitar which Smith played mostly when Trooper was known as Applejack. Several times he was nominated for the Composer of the year Juno award.
