= Ra McGuire =

Canadian singer and songwriter

- Born: Ramon Wayne McGuire; June 13, 1950 (age 76); Vancouver, Canada
- Genres: Rock, pop
- Occupations: Musician, songwriter
- Instruments: Vocals, acoustic guitar
- Years active: 1967–2021
- Website: ramcguire.com

Ramon Wayne "Ra" McGuire (pronounced "Ray"; born June 13, 1950) is a Canadian singer, songwriter, and founding and longtime member of the rock band Trooper. McGuire performed with Trooper and musical partner Brian Smith from 1975 until their retirement in 2021.

In 2023, McGuire was inducted into both the Canadian Music Hall of Fame and Canada's walk of Fame.

As a songwriter, McGuire has received “The National Achievement Award” from SOCAN and been nominated four times for the 'Composer of the Year' Juno Award. As the singer and songwriter for Trooper, his recordings have been nominated twice for 'Album of the Year' and once for 'Best Selling Album of the Year'. Trooper was nominated three times for ‘Group of the Year’, and won the Juno Award for ‘Group of the Year' in 1980. McGuire also received a BC CARAS (JUNO) Award for Best Male Vocalist.

== Biography ==
McGuire was born in Vancouver, British Columbia (BC).

McGuire and his wife, Debbie, spearheaded the formation of a Fine Arts based school in the Surrey, British Columbia school district from 1996 to 1998. The school is now housed at White Rock Elementary with another proposed for the northern end of the city. In 2005 the couple (unsuccessfully) fought high rise development in their hometown of White Rock, British Columbia.

At the 1999 SOCAN Awards, McGuire received a SOCAN Classic Award for the Trooper hit "Two for the Show", presented for songs that have received over 100,000 documented radio plays. He received two additional Classic Awards with songwriting partner Brian Smith for "We're Here for a Good Time" and "Santa Maria".

McGuire received a fourth SOCAN Classic Award in 2005, for "Oh, Pretty Lady."

In 2006, McGuire published an account of life on the road with Trooper, Here for a Good Time, with Insomniac Press.

In 2007, he served as one of three judges for the CBC's Seven Wonders of Canada competition and co-produced his son, Connor McGuire's first solo album, Different After Dawn.

McGuire was featured when Trooper performed in the 2010 Olympics Victory Ceremonies in Vancouver on February 21, 2010. Coverage of the event was broadcast in Canada and around the world on networks such as CTV and Much Music.

On April 25, 2012, Ra and Debbie McGuire were awarded the World Harmony Run's Torchbearer Award for their collaborative commitment to inspire cultural harmony and community spirit through music, and champion the importance of fine arts in education.

On November 19, 2012, McGuire was presented with a SOCAN National Achievement Award, which is presented to artists who have had outstanding success, predominantly in the Canadian music industry, over the span of their career. He also received three more SOCAN Classic Awards for "Raise A Little Hell", "General Hand Grenade", and "Janine", co-written with songwriting partner Brian Smith.

McGuire along with Brian Smith retired in 2021.

On May 18, 2023, Trooper was inducted into the Canadian Music Hall of Fame and McGuire received the Juno statuette as one of the inducted members. On September 6, 2024, Trooper was inducted into the BC Entertainment Hall of Fame, and McGuire was honoured with a star on the Granville Street StarWalk, located outside the Commodore Ballroom in Vancouver.
