= Richie Sambora discography =

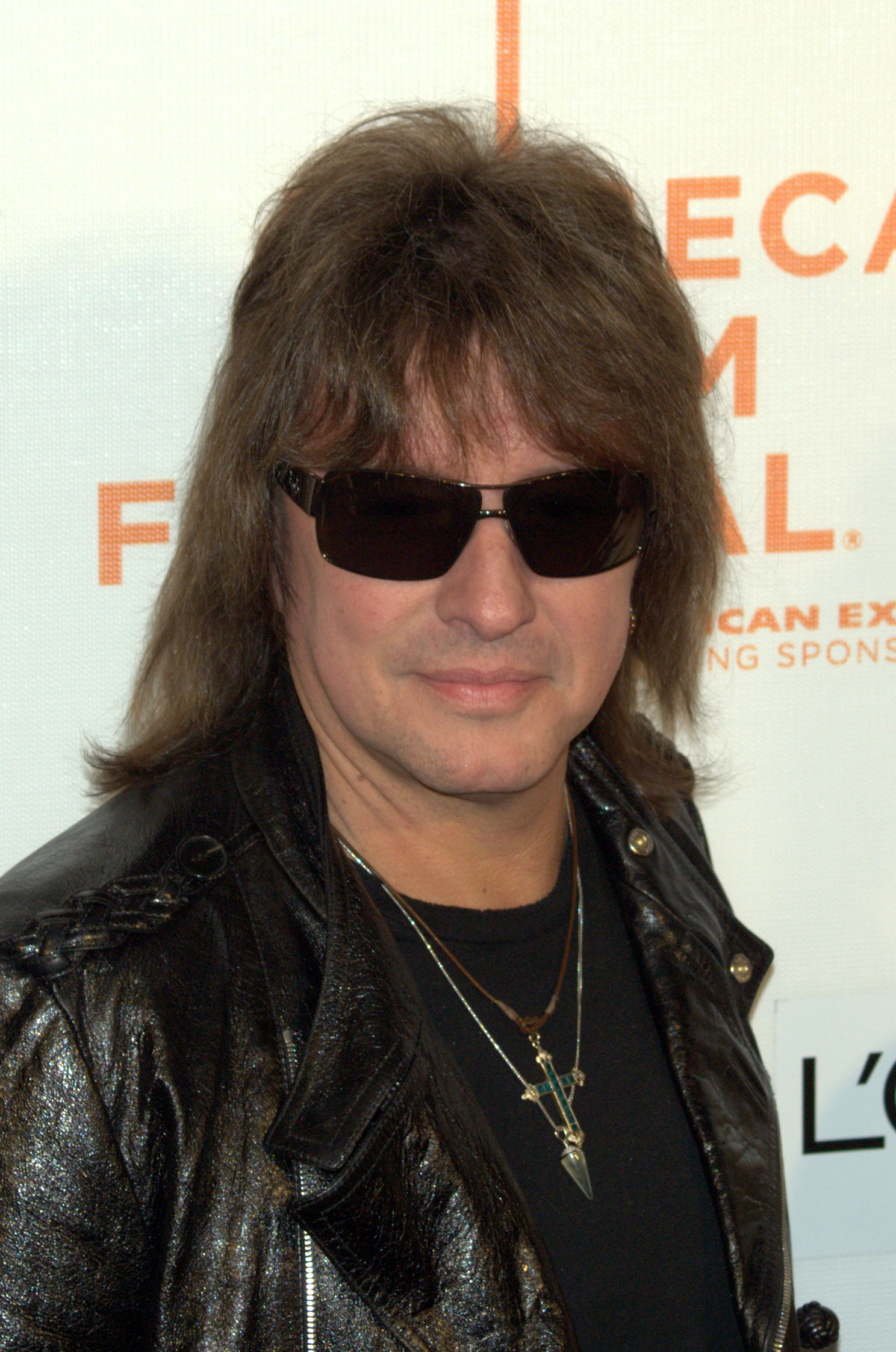
- Studio albums: 3
- Singles: 17
- Music videos: 7
- Collaborations: 6
- Other singles: 12

The discography of American singer Richie Sambora includes three released studio albums and fourteen singles.

== Albums ==
=== Studio albums ===
Year	Album details	Peak chart positions									
Year	Album details	US	CAN	UK	AUS	NL	GER	AUT	SWI	SWE	FIN
1991	Stranger in This Town: Release date: 1991; Label: Mercury Records	36	42	20	44	69	72	—	15	31	—
1998	Undiscovered Soul: Release date: February 23, 1998; Label: Mercury Records	174	3	24	49	42	15	33	23	37	37
2012	Aftermath of the Lowdown: Release date: September 18, 2012; Label: Dangerbird Records	149	4	35	—	20	38	45	74	—	—
"—" denotes releases that did not chart

== Singles ==
Year	Single	Peak chart positions						Album
Year	Single	US	US Main	CAN	AUS	UK	GER	Album
1991	"Ballad of Youth"	63	13	67	25	59	—	Stranger in This Town
1991	"One Light Burning"	—	—	—	—	—	—	Stranger in This Town
1991	"Stranger in This Town"	—	38	—	—	—	—	Stranger in This Town
1991	"Mr. Bluesman" (Solo by Eric Clapton)	—	—	—	—	—	—	Stranger in This Town
1991	"The Answer"	—	—	—	—	—	—	Stranger in This Town
1991	"Rosie"	—	—	—	—	—	—	Stranger in This Town
1998	"Hard Times Come Easy"	—	39	—	—	37	74	Undiscovered Soul
1998	"In It for Love"	—	—	—	—	52	—	Undiscovered Soul
1998	"Undiscovered Soul"	—	—	—	—	—	—	Undiscovered Soul
1998	"Made in America"	—	—	—	—	—	—	Undiscovered Soul
2012	"Every Road Leads Home to You"	—	—	—	—	—	—	Aftermath of the Lowdown
2012	"I'll Always Walk Beside You"	—	—	—	—	—	—	Aftermath of the Lowdown
2012	"Sugar Daddy"	—	—	—	—	—	—	Aftermath of the Lowdown
2013	"Come Back as Me"	—	—	—	—	—	—	
2013	"Engine 19"	—	—	—	—	—	—	
2024	"I Pray"	—	—	—	—	—	—	TBC
2024	"Livin' Alone"	—	—	—	—	—	—	TBC
2024	"Songs That Wrote My Life"	—	—	—	—	—	—	TBC
2024	"Believe (In Miracles)"	—	—	—	—	—	—	TBC
2024	"We'll Get By"	—	—	—	—	—	—	TBC
2025	"Born to Rock"	—	—	—	—	—	—	TBC
"—" denotes releases that did not chart

== Other album appearances ==
Year	Song	Artist	Album
1990	"The Wind Cries Mary"	Richie Sambora	The Adventures of Ford Fairlane – Original Soundtrack
1992	"Mr. Sambo"	Richie Sambora	Guitar World Presents: Guitars That Rule the World
1992	"You Never Really Know"	Richie Sambora	Music from Zalman King's Red Shoe Diaries
1993	"Good Morning Little School Girl (Part 2)"	Paul Rodgers	Muddy Water Blues - A Tribute To Muddy Waters
1995	"The Time of Your Life"	Little Steven	The Time of Your Life
1997	"Forever"	Takashi Sorimachi feat. Richie Sambora	Message / Forever 3" CDS
1997	"Long Way Around"	Richie Sambora	Fire Down Below (in the film itself, not the soundtrack album)
1997	"Gonna Rain"	Carmine Appice	Carmine Appice's Guitar Zeus 2: Channel Mind Radio
1997	"O Holy Night (Cantique De Noel)"	Richie Sambora	Merry Axemas – A Guitar Christmas
1997	"Oh Come All Ye Faithful"	Richie Sambora	A Home for the Holidays
1999	"Ava's Eyes"	Richie Sambora	Sounds of Wood & Steel 2
1999	"I'm Wanted"	Kel Spencer feat. Richie Sambora	Wild Wild West Soundtrack
1999	"Why Don't You Love Me?"	Amanda Marshall (Richie Sambora on guitar)	Tuesday's Child
2001	"Take Me On"	Richie Sambora	On the Line Soundtrack
2001	"Misery"	P!nk (Richie Sambora on guitar)	M!ssundaztood
2002	"One Last Goodbye"	Richie Sambora	The Banger Sisters Soundtrack
2004	"See That My Grave Is Kept Clean" "When a Blind Man Cries"	Richie Sambora	Heaven & Earth Featuring Stuart Smith
2005	"Let Me Roll It"	Les Paul & Friends	American Made World Played
2005	"Funky Santa (duet with Richie Sambora)"	Bo Bice	Inside Your Heaven / Vehicle
2005	"Vehicle"	Everett Bradley	Toy
2008	"Baby (Rock Remix)"	LL Cool J feat. Richie Sambora	Exit 13
2008	"Great Hall of Fame"	Richie Sambora	Les Paul & Friends – A Tribute to a Legend
2008	"Willing to Try"	Richie Sambora	Randy Jackson's Music Club, Vol. 1
2008	"Blood on the Ground"	Richie Sambora	Dark Streets Soundtrack
2012	"Whisper"	Superbus feat. Richie Sambora	Sunset
2013	"Man & Machine"	Heaven and Earth feat. Richie Sambora	Dig
2017	"Masterpiece"	RSO	Single
2017	Rise	RSO	EP
2017	"Walk With Me"	RSO	Single
2017	Making History	RSO	EP
2017	"One Night of Peace"	RSO	Single
2018	"Got You Babe / Forever All the Way"	RSO	Single
2018	Radio Free America	RSO	Album
2023	"Rockstar"	Dolly Parton feat. Richie Sambora	Rockstar

== Music videos ==
Year	Song
1991	"Ballad of Youth"
1991	"One Light Burning"
1991	"Stranger in This Town"
1998	"Hard Times Come Easy"
1998	"In It for Love"
2012	"Every Road Leads Home to You"
2012	"Taking a Chance on the Wind"
