= Slippery When Wet Tour =

1986–87 concert tour by Bon Jovi

- Tour by Bon Jovi
- Poster to the concerts in New York
- Associated album: Slippery When Wet
- Start date: July 14, 1986
- End date: October 17, 1987

Bon Jovi concert chronology
- 7800 Fahrenheit Tour (1985); Slippery When Wet Tour (1986–1987); New Jersey Syndicate Tour (1988–1990)

The Slippery When Wet Tour, by American hard rock band Bon Jovi, ran from 1986 to 1987. It supported the band's multi-platinum 1986 album Slippery When Wet and was their first major worldwide tour, visiting places such as Australia and Canada for the first time.

"I remember reading about how The Beatles stopped playing live, because everyone just screamed through all the shows", noted Jon Bon Jovi. "Musicianship and song quality meant so little to the fans that the band just felt undervalued. You know what? I understand what they mean. It got so bad when we toured for Slippery When Wet that there were times I was freaking out… We indulged in everything that was on offer. But it wasn't real, and what I wanted above all else was to be given credit for the work I put into the songs and into the recording… The problem was that I didn't notice how the image overtook what we were about."

Of the omission of recordings from this tour from One Wild Night Live 1985–2001, Jon Bon Jovi remarked: "It makes sense for the Slippery tour not to be represented, because at that time I was dosed up on cortisone and my voice was shot. Back then, it wasn't much of a voice."

== Accompanying acts ==
Cinderella supported at the majority of shows on the North American leg of the tour. In mainland Europe, Queensrÿche was the support. For the UK leg, support came from the British band FM on all dates except for the last two for which Queensrÿche was the support act. Other opening bands on this tour were Twisted Sister, The Smithereens, Keel and Winger, while The Choirboys were the direct support act for the Australian leg.

Judas Priest headlined the first leg in Canada and .38 Special headlined the second North American leg. "We were in Sioux Falls, South Dakota, when we found out that the album made number one in America…" Jon Bon Jovi recalled. "Bon Jovi were selling a million records a month and it was phenomenal. .38 Special's manager said, 'Maybe we'll let you be co-headliners.' We went, 'Great. Gotta go now. It's our time."

The tour also took the band to the Monsters of Rock 1986 in Germany with Warlock, Michael Schenker Group, Def Leppard, Ozzy Osbourne and headliners Scorpions. Bon Jovi, as a headliner this time, played at Monsters of Rock again in 1987 in England, along with Dio, Metallica, Anthrax, W.A.S.P. and Cinderella.

== Setlist ==
The setlist of the tour varied between shows and countries. An average of 16 to 18 songs were played at each show. This is a set list from the show at Kemper Arena, Kansas City, Missouri, United States which was also popular throughout the Tour:

- "Pink Flamingos" (Note: "Pink Flamingos" is the name given to the keyboard solo that serves as an intro for the studio version of "Let It Rock", often played before other songs on this tour.)
- "Raise Your Hands"
- "Breakout"
- "I'd Die for You"
- "Tokyo Road"
- "You Give Love a Bad Name"
- "Wild in the Streets"
- "Never Say Goodbye"
- "Livin' on a Prayer"
- "Let it Rock"
- Guitar solo
- Drum solo
- "In and Out of Love"
- "Runaway"
- "Wanted Dead or Alive"
- "Drift Away" (Dobie Gray cover)
- "Get Ready"

== Tour dates ==
List of 1986 concerts, showing date, city, country, venue, tickets sold, number of available tickets and amount of gross revenue
| Date | City | Country | Venue | Attendance | Revenue |
|---|---|---|---|---|---|
| July 14, 1986 | Vancouver | Canada | BC Place | —N/a | —N/a |
| July 16, 1986 | Calgary | Canada | Olympic Saddledome | —N/a | —N/a |
| July 17, 1986 | Edmonton | Canada | Northlands Coliseum | —N/a | —N/a |
| July 19, 1986 | Winnipeg | Canada | Winnipeg Arena | —N/a | —N/a |
| July 22, 1986 | Toronto | Canada | Maple Leaf Gardens | —N/a | —N/a |
| July 23, 1986 | Montreal | Canada | Montreal Forum | —N/a | —N/a |
| July 24, 1986 | Quebec City | Canada | Quebec City Coliseum | —N/a | —N/a |
| July 26, 1986 | Ottawa | Canada | Ottawa Civic Centre | —N/a | —N/a |
| August 11, 1986 | Nagoya | Japan | Aichi Kōsei Nenkin Kaikan | —N/a | —N/a |
| August 12, 1986 | Fukuoka | Japan | Fukuoka Sunpalace | —N/a | —N/a |
| August 13, 1986 | Osaka | Japan | Festival Hall | —N/a | —N/a |
| August 14, 1986 | Osaka | Japan | Festival Hall | —N/a | —N/a |
| August 16, 1986 | Kobe | Japan | Kobe Kokusai Kaikan | —N/a | —N/a |
| August 18, 1986 | Tokyo | Japan | Nippon Budokan | —N/a | —N/a |
| August 20, 1986 | Yokohama | Japan | Yokohama Bunka Taiikukan | —N/a | —N/a |
| August 21, 1986 | Sendai | Japan | Miyagi-ken Kōkaidō | —N/a | —N/a |
| August 23, 1986 | Aomori | Japan | Aomori Shimin Bunka Hall | —N/a | —N/a |
| August 25, 1986 | Sapporo | Japan | Hokkaido Kōsei Nenkin Kaikan | —N/a | —N/a |
| August 30, 1986 | Nuremberg | West Germany | Zeppelinfeld | —N/a | —N/a |
| August 31, 1986 | Mannheim | West Germany | Maimarktgelände | —N/a | —N/a |
| September 9, 1986 | Binghamton | United States | Broome County Veterans Memorial Arena | 6,936 / 7,200 | $92,499 |
| September 12, 1986 | East Rutherford | United States | Brendan Byrne Arena | 14,028 / 17,200 | $209,760 |
| September 13, 1986 | Mansfield | United States | Great Woods Center for the Performing Arts | 11,342 / 15,000 | $160,628 |
| September 14, 1986 | Glens Falls | United States | Glens Falls Civic Center | 5,787 / 7,200 | $81,978 |
| September 19, 1986 | Philadelphia | United States | Spectrum | 9,349 / 12,742 | $126,616 |
| September 21, 1986 | Greensboro | United States | Greensboro Coliseum | 9,530 / 12,000 | $142,950 |
| September 23, 1986 | Cullowhee | United States | Ramsey Center | —N/a | —N/a |
| September 26, 1986 | Charlotte | United States | Charlotte Coliseum | 12,443 / 12,443 | $180,424 |
| September 27, 1986 | Atlanta | United States | Omni Coliseum | 14,555 / 14,555 | $222,825 |
| September 28, 1986 | Pelham | United States | Oak Mountain Amphitheatre | 7,858 / 7,858 | $106,755 |
| October 1, 1986 | Columbia | United States | Hearnes Center | —N/a | —N/a |
| October 3, 1986 | Indianapolis | United States | Market Square Arena | 11,544 / 11,544 | $155,142 |
| October 4, 1986 | Evansville | United States | Roberts Municipal Stadium | 13,600 / 13,600 | $190,400 |
| October 5, 1986 | Fort Wayne | United States | Allen County War Memorial Coliseum | 11,000 / 11,000 | $150,156 |
| October 7, 1986 | Pittsburgh | United States | Civic Arena | —N/a | —N/a |
| October 8, 1986 | Dayton | United States | Hara Arena | 8,000 / 8,000 | $112,000 |
| October 10, 1986 | Cedar Rapids | United States | Five Seasons Center | 10,000 / 10,000 | $141,578 |
| October 11, 1986 | Omaha | United States | Omaha Civic Auditorium | 12,000 / 12,000 | $160,458 |
| October 12, 1986 | Bloomington | United States | Met Center | 11,849 / 12,500 | $166,640 |
| October 17, 1986 | Nashville | United States | Nashville Municipal Auditorium | 9,900 / 9,900 | $143,550 |
| October 18, 1986 | Memphis | United States | Mid-South Coliseum | 11,511 / 11,511 | $166,910 |
| November 7, 1986 | Bradford | England | St George's Hall | —N/a | —N/a |
| November 9, 1986 | Ipswich | England | Gaumont Theatre | —N/a | —N/a |
| November 10, 1986 | Sheffield | England | Sheffield City Hall | —N/a | —N/a |
| November 11, 1986 | Birmingham | England | Birmingham Odeon Theatre | —N/a | —N/a |
| November 12, 1986 | Edinburgh | Scotland | Edinburgh Playhouse | —N/a | —N/a |
| November 14, 1986 | Manchester | England | Manchester Apollo | —N/a | —N/a |
| November 15, 1986 | Newcastle | England | Newcastle City Hall | —N/a | —N/a |
| November 17, 1986 | London | England | Hammersmith Odeon | —N/a | —N/a |
| November 18, 1986 | London | England | Hammersmith Odeon | —N/a | —N/a |
| November 20, 1986 | Liverpool | England | Royal Court Theatre | —N/a | —N/a |
| November 21, 1986 | Hanley | England | Victoria Hall | —N/a | —N/a |
| November 23, 1986 | Leicester | England | De Montfort Hall | —N/a | —N/a |
| November 24, 1986 | London | England | Hammersmith Odeon | —N/a | —N/a |
| November 25, 1986 | London | England | Hammersmith Odeon | —N/a | —N/a |
| November 27, 1986 | Arnhem | Netherlands | Rijnhal | —N/a | —N/a |
| November 28, 1986 | Paris | France | Le Zénith de Paris | —N/a | —N/a |
| November 29, 1986 | Luzern | Switzerland | Festhalle Allmend | —N/a | —N/a |
| December 2, 1986 | Dortmund | West Germany | Westfalenhallen | —N/a | —N/a |
| December 3, 1986 | Hanover | West Germany | Eilenriedehalle | —N/a | —N/a |
| December 4, 1986 | Copenhagen | Denmark | Falkoner Center | —N/a | —N/a |
| December 6, 1986 | Stockholm | Sweden | Johanneshovs Isstadion | —N/a | —N/a |
| December 8, 1986 | Helsinki | Finland | Helsingin Jäähalli | —N/a | —N/a |
| December 19, 1986 | Bethlehem | United States | Stabler Arena | 11,359 / 12,236 | $173,370 |
| December 20, 1986 | Bethlehem | United States | Stabler Arena | 11,359 / 12,236 | $173,370 |
| December 21, 1986 | Johnstown | United States | Cambria County War Memorial Arena | 7,000 / 7,000 | $96,250 |
| December 26, 1986 | Portland | United States | Cumberland County Civic Center | 9,500 / 9,500 | $137,750 |
| December 27, 1986 | Worcester | United States | Centrum in Worcester | 12,236 / 12,236 | $167,946 |
| December 29, 1986 | Baltimore | United States | Baltimore Arena | 13,525 / 13,641 | $200,550 |
| December 30, 1986 | New Haven | United States | New Haven Veterans Memorial Coliseum | —N/a | —N/a |
| December 31, 1986 | East Rutherford | United States | Brendan Byrne Arena | 18,534 / 18,534 | $293,130 |

List of 1987 concerts, showing date, city, country, venue, tickets sold, number of available tickets and amount of gross revenue
| Date | City | Country | Venue | Attendance | Revenue |
|---|---|---|---|---|---|
| January 2, 1987 | Hershey | United States | Hersheypark Arena | 7,653 / 7,653 | $94,245 |
| January 3, 1987 | Kingston | United States | Kingston Armory | —N/a | —N/a |
| January 4, 1987 | Utica | United States | Utica Memorial Auditorium | —N/a | —N/a |
| January 9, 1987 | Denver | United States | McNichols Sports Arena | 16,995 / 16,995 | $249,621 |
| January 10, 1987 | Albuquerque | United States | Tingley Coliseum | —N/a | —N/a |
| January 11, 1987 | El Paso | United States | El Paso County Coliseum | 8,000 / 8,000 | $115,880 |
| January 13, 1987 | Tucson | United States | Tucson Arena | 9,562 / 9,562 | $129,125 |
| January 14, 1987 | Phoenix | United States | Arizona Veterans Memorial Coliseum | 16,002 / 16,002 | $224,028 |
| January 16, 1987 | San Diego | United States | San Diego Sports Arena | 13,675 / 13,675 | $198,240 |
| January 18, 1987 | Las Vegas | United States | Thomas & Mack Center | 9,514 / 11,845 | $141,645 |
| January 19, 1987 | San Bernardino | United States | National Orange Showgrounds | 6,500 / 6,500 | $36,058 |
| January 20, 1987 | Fresno | United States | Selland Arena | 9,085 / 9,085 | $122,097 |
| January 21, 1987 | Long Beach | United States | Long Beach Arena | 13,783 / 13,783 | $218,729 |
| January 23, 1987 | Reno | United States | Lawlor Events Center | 9,567 / 9,567 | $148,289 |
| January 24, 1987 | Daly City | United States | Cow Palace | 14,500 / 14,500 | $239,250 |
| January 26, 1987 | Seattle | United States | Seattle Center Coliseum | 26,315 / 26,315 | $421,020 |
| January 27, 1987 | Seattle | United States | Seattle Center Coliseum | 26,315 / 26,315 | $421,020 |
| January 31, 1987 | Tyler | United States | The Oil Palace | —N/a | —N/a |
| February 2, 1987 | Dallas | United States | Reunion Arena | 17,798 / 17,798 | $248,308 |
| February 3, 1987 | Corpus Christi | United States | Bayfront Plaza Convention Center | 5,088 / 5,088 | $71,451 |
| February 4, 1987 | San Antonio | United States | San Antonio Convention Center | 12,622 / 12,622 | $178,950 |
| February 6, 1987 | Lake Charles | United States | Lake Charles Civic Center | 8,000 / 8,000 | $116,000 |
| February 7, 1987 | Houston | United States | The Summit | 14,979 / 14,979 | $212,549 |
| February 8, 1987 | Austin | United States | Frank Erwin Center | 16,069 / 16,069 | $251,664 |
| February 10, 1987 | Shreveport | United States | Hirsch Memorial Coliseum | 10,000 / 10,000 | $145,000 |
| February 11, 1987 | Starkville | United States | Humphrey Coliseum | —N/a | —N/a |
| February 12, 1987 | Biloxi | United States | Mississippi Coast Coliseum | 15,090 / 15,090 | $218,836 |
| February 14, 1987 | Pembroke Pines | United States | Hollywood Sportatorium | 13,154 / 13,154 | $184,156 |
| February 15, 1987 | St. Petersburg | United States | Bayfront Center | 8,600 / 8,600 | $129,000 |
| February 17, 1987 | Fort Myers | United States | Lee County Civic Center | 9,219 / 9,219 | $138,014 |
| February 18, 1987 | Jacksonville | United States | Jacksonville Coliseum | 11,676 / 11,676 | $173,145 |
| February 21, 1987 | San Juan | Puerto Rico | Hiram Bithorn Stadium | —N/a | —N/a |
| February 24, 1987 | Oklahoma City | United States | Myriad Convention Center | 14,450 / 14,450 | $216,750 |
| February 26, 1987 | Kansas City | United States | Kemper Arena | 16,748 / 16,748 | $255,533 |
| February 27, 1987 | St. Louis | United States | Kiel Auditorium | 10,522 / 10,522 | $152,700 |
| February 28, 1987 | Little Rock | United States | Barton Coliseum | 10,000 / 10,000 | $150,000 |
| March 1, 1987 | Shreveport | United States | Hirsch Memorial Coliseum | —N/a | —N/a |
| March 2, 1987 | Starkville | United States | Humphrey Coliseum | —N/a | —N/a |
| March 3, 1987 | Indianapolis | United States | Market Square Arena | 15,740 / 15,740 | $228,230 |
| March 4, 1987 | Chicago | United States | UIC Pavilion | 18,704 / 18,704 | $295,552 |
| March 5, 1987 | Chicago | United States | UIC Pavilion | 18,704 / 18,704 | $295,552 |
| March 6, 1987 | Rochester | United States | Mayo Civic Center | 7,490 / 7,490 | $116,095 |
| March 8, 1987 | Milwaukee | United States | MECCA Arena | 10,910 / 10,910 | $165,540 |
| March 10, 1987 | Detroit | United States | Cobo Arena | 23,998 / 23,998 | $395,967 |
| March 11, 1987 | Detroit | United States | Cobo Arena | 23,998 / 23,998 | $395,967 |
| March 12, 1987 | Indianapolis | United States | Market Square Arena | —N/a | —N/a |
| March 14, 1987 | Rockford | United States | Rockford MetroCentre | —N/a | —N/a |
| March 19, 1987 | Cincinnati | United States | Cincinnati Gardens | 20,410 / 20,410 | $300,510 |
| March 20, 1987 | Cincinnati | United States | Cincinnati Gardens | 20,410 / 20,410 | $300,510 |
| March 21, 1987 | Lexington | United States | Rupp Arena | 22,283 / 22,283 | $334,245 |
| March 23, 1987 | Atlanta | United States | Omni Coliseum | 31,663/ 31,663 | $490,777 |
| March 24, 1987 | Atlanta | United States | Omni Coliseum | 31,663/ 31,663 | $490,777 |
| March 25, 1987 | Charlotte | United States | Charlotte Coliseum | 12,900 / 12,900 | $189,915 |
| March 27, 1987 | Pittsburgh | United States | Civic Arena | 16,282 / 16,282 | $224,455 |
| March 28, 1987 | Buffalo | United States | Buffalo Memorial Auditorium | —N/a | —N/a |
| March 30, 1987 | Richfield Township | United States | Richfield Coliseum | 18,066 / 18,066 | $270,990 |
| March 31, 1987 | Huntington | United States | Huntington Civic Center | 10,791 / 10,791 | $161,865 |
| April 2, 1987 | Philadelphia | United States | Spectrum | —N/a | —N/a |
| April 3, 1987 | Hartford | United States | Hartford Civic Center | —N/a | —N/a |
| April 4, 1987 | Philadelphia | United States | Spectrum | —N/a | —N/a |
| April 7, 1987 | Uniondale | United States | Nassau Veterans Memorial Coliseum | 18,189 / 18,189 | $229,634 |
| April 9, 1987 | Binghamton | United States | Broome County Veterans Memorial Arena | 7,200 / 7,200 | $101,674 |
| April 10, 1987 | Troy | United States | RPI Field House | 7,635 / 7,635 | $111,862 |
| April 11, 1987 | Springfield | United States | Springfield Civic Center | —N/a | —N/a |
| April 13, 1987 | Landover | United States | Capital Centre | 17,787 / 17,787 | $293,496 |
| April 15, 1987 | Philadelphia | United States | Spectrum | 34,340 / 34,340 | $466,550 |
| April 16, 1987 | Philadelphia | United States | Spectrum | 34,340 / 34,340 | $466,550 |
| May 1, 1987 | Providence | United States | Providence Civic Center | 25,664 / 25,664 | $416,666 |
| May 2, 1987 | Providence | United States | Providence Civic Center | 25,664 / 25,664 | $416,666 |
| May 3, 1987 | Syracuse | United States | Onondaga County War Memorial | —N/a | —N/a |
| May 5, 1987 | Pittsburgh | United States | Civic Arena | 16,553 / 16,553 | $248,441 |
| May 6, 1987 | Richfield Township | United States | Richfield Coliseum | —N/a | —N/a |
| May 8, 1987 | Richmond | United States | Richmond Coliseum | 12,500 / 12,500 | $178,536 |
| May 9, 1987 | Greensboro | United States | Greensboro Coliseum | 14,928 / 15,000 | $238,848 |
| May 10, 1987 | Hampton | United States | Hampton Coliseum | 13,800 / 13,800 | $199,070 |
| May 12, 1987 | Huntsville | United States | Von Braun Civic Center | 9,891 / 9,891 | $148,365 |
| May 13, 1987 | Knoxville | United States | Stokely Athletic Center | 11,991 / 11,991 | $194,852 |
| May 14, 1987 | Birmingham | United States | Legacy Arena | 17,220 / 17,220 | $258,300 |
| May 16, 1987 | Nashville | United States | Starwood Amphitheatre | —N/a | —N/a |
| May 17, 1987 | Des Moines | United States | Iowa State Fairgrounds Grandstand | 29,097 | $516,165 |
| May 18, 1987 | St. Louis | United States | St. Louis Arena | 18,423 / 18,423 | $281,232 |
| May 20, 1987 | Fort Wayne | United States | Allen County War Memorial Coliseum | —N/a | —N/a |
| May 21, 1987 | Indianapolis | United States | Market Square Arena | 15,732 / 15,732 | $228,132 |
| May 22, 1987 | Louisville | United States | Freedom Hall | 15,642 / 19,104 | $242,451 |
| May 24, 1987 | Thornville | United States | Buckeye Lake Music Center | 42,500 / 42,500 | $680,000 |
| May 26, 1987 | Detroit | United States | Joe Louis Arena | —N/a | —N/a |
| May 27, 1987 | Detroit | United States | Joe Louis Arena | —N/a | —N/a |
| May 29, 1987 | Detroit | United States | Joe Louis Arena | —N/a | —N/a |
| May 29, 1987 | Evansville | United States | Roberts Municipal Stadium | 13,140 /13,140 | $203,745 |
| May 30, 1987 | Rosemont | United States | Rosemont Horizon | 31,335 / 31,335 | $548,363 |
| May 31, 1987 | Rosemont | United States | Rosemont Horizon | 31,335 / 31,335 | $548,363 |
| June 5, 1987 | Rockford | United States | Rockford MetroCentre | 9,133 / 9,133 | $141,562 |
| June 6, 1987 | Bloomington | United States | Met Center | 33,719 / 33,719 | $546,678 |
| June 7, 1987 | Bloomington | United States | Met Center | 33,719 / 33,719 | $546,678 |
| June 9, 1987 | Peoria | United States | Peoria Civic Center | 10,875 / 10,875 | $168,563 |
| June 10, 1987 | Cedar Rapids | United States | Five Seasons Center | 10,000 / 10,000 | $155,000 |
| June 11, 1987 | Kansas City | United States | Kemper Arena | 16,417 / 16,417 | $249,349 |
| June 13, 1987 | Casper | United States | Casper Events Center | 10,424 / 10,424 | $155,260 |
| June 14, 1987 | Denver | United States | McNichols Sports Arena | 25,384 / 29,000 | $422,959 |
| June 15, 1987 | Denver | United States | McNichols Sports Arena | 25,384 / 29,000 | $422,959 |
| June 17, 1987 | Salt Lake City | United States | Salt Palace | —N/a | —N/a |
| June 18, 1987 | Salt Lake City | United States | Salt Palace | —N/a | —N/a |
| June 20, 1987 | Irvine | United States | Irvine Meadows Amphitheatre | 45,000 / 45,000 | $716,005 |
| June 21, 1987 | Irvine | United States | Irvine Meadows Amphitheatre | 45,000 / 45,000 | $716,005 |
| June 22, 1987 | Irvine | United States | Irvine Meadows Amphitheatre | 45,000 / 45,000 | $716,005 |
| June 25, 1987 | Mountain View | United States | Shoreline Amphitheatre | 45,500 / 60,000 | —N/a |
| June 26, 1987 | Mountain View | United States | Shoreline Amphitheatre | 45,500 / 60,000 | —N/a |
| June 27, 1987 | Mountain View | United States | Shoreline Amphitheatre | 45,500 / 60,000 | —N/a |
| June 29, 1987 | Portland | United States | Memorial Coliseum Complex | 23,514 / 23,514 | $376,224 |
| June 30, 1987 | Portland | United States | Memorial Coliseum Complex | 23,514 / 23,514 | $376,224 |
| July 2, 1987 | Vancouver | Canada | BC Place | N/A | N/A |
| July 4, 1987 | Calgary | Canada | Olympic Saddledome | 16,530 / 16,530 | $254,672 |
| July 10, 1987 | East Troy | United States | Alpine Valley Music Theatre | 30,892 / 30,892 | $467,417 |
| July 12, 1987 | Toronto | Canada | Canadian National Exhibition | 22,788 / 22,788 | $381,881 |
| July 14, 1987 | Ottawa | Canada | Ottawa Civic Centre | —N/a | —N/a |
| July 15, 1987 | Quebec City | Canada | Quebec City Coliseum | —N/a | —N/a |
| July 16, 1987 | Montreal | Canada | Montreal Forum | —N/a | —N/a |
| July 18, 1987 | Pittsburgh | United States | Civic Arena | 16,501 / 16,501 | $247,650 |
| July 21, 1987 | Landover | United States | Capital Centre | 33,593 / 34,490 | $554,285 |
| July 22, 1987 | Landover | United States | Capital Centre | 33,593 / 34,490 | $554,285 |
| July 23, 1987 | Hershey | United States | Hersheypark Arena | —N/a | —N/a |
| July 25, 1987 | Erie | United States | Erie Veterans Memorial Stadium | 15,608 / 15,608 | $249,728 |
| July 27, 1987 | Mansfield | United States | Great Woods Center for the Performing Arts | 45,000 / 45,000 | $702,948 |
| July 28, 1987 | Mansfield | United States | Great Woods Center for the Performing Arts | 45,000 / 45,000 | $702,948 |
| July 29, 1987 | Mansfield | United States | Great Woods Center for the Performing Arts | 45,000 / 45,000 | $702,948 |
| August 1, 1987 | New York City | United States | Madison Square Garden | —N/a | —N/a |
| August 2, 1987 | New York City | United States | Madison Square Garden | —N/a | —N/a |
| August 3, 1987 | New York City | United States | Madison Square Garden | —N/a | —N/a |
| August 6, 1987 | East Rutherford | United States | Meadowlands Arena | 38,284 / 41,056 | $684,696 |
| August 7, 1987 | East Rutherford | United States | Meadowlands Arena | 38,284 / 41,056 | $684,696 |
| August 9, 1987 | Uniondale | United States | Nassau Veterans Memorial Coliseum | 16,547 / 16,547 | $304,050 |
| August 22, 1987 | Castle Donington | England | Donington Park | —N/a | —N/a |
| September 5, 1987 | Melbourne | Australia | Melbourne Entertainment Centre | —N/a | —N/a |
| September 6, 1987 | Melbourne | Australia | Melbourne Entertainment Centre | —N/a | —N/a |
| September 7, 1987 | Melbourne | Australia | Melbourne Entertainment Centre | —N/a | —N/a |
| September 9, 1987 | Melbourne | Australia | Melbourne Entertainment Centre | —N/a | —N/a |
| September 10, 1987 | Melbourne | Australia | Melbourne Entertainment Centre | —N/a | —N/a |
| September 12, 1987 | Brisbane | Australia | Brisbane Entertainment Centre | —N/a | —N/a |
| September 14, 1987 | Sydney | Australia | Sydney Entertainment Centre | —N/a | —N/a |
| September 15, 1987 | Sydney | Australia | Sydney Entertainment Centre | —N/a | —N/a |
| September 16, 1987 | Sydney | Australia | Sydney Entertainment Centre | —N/a | —N/a |
| September 17, 1987 | Sydney | Australia | Sydney Entertainment Centre | —N/a | —N/a |
| September 18, 1987 | Sydney | Australia | Sydney Entertainment Centre | —N/a | —N/a |
| September 19, 1987 | Auckland | New Zealand | Western Springs Stadium | —N/a | —N/a |
| September 24, 1987 | Tokyo | Japan | Nippon Budokan | —N/a | —N/a |
| September 25, 1987 | Tokyo | Japan | Nippon Budokan | —N/a | —N/a |
| September 28, 1987 | Tokyo | Japan | Nippon Budokan | —N/a | —N/a |
| September 29, 1987 | Tokyo | Japan | Nippon Budokan | —N/a | —N/a |
| September 30, 1987 | Tokyo | Japan | Nippon Budokan | —N/a | —N/a |
| October 1, 1987 | Yokohama | Japan | Yokohama Bunka Taiikukan | —N/a | —N/a |
| October 3, 1987 | Nagoya | Japan | Nagoya-shi Sōgō Taiikukan | —N/a | —N/a |
| October 5, 1987 | Osaka | Japan | Osaka-jō Hall | —N/a | —N/a |
| October 6, 1987 | Osaka | Japan | Osaka-jō Hall | —N/a | —N/a |
| October 7, 1987 | Shizuoka | Japan | Shizuoka-shi Bunka Hall | —N/a | —N/a |
| October 15, 1987 | Honolulu | United States | Blaisdell Arena | —N/a | —N/a |
| October 16, 1987 | Honolulu | United States | Blaisdell Arena | —N/a | —N/a |
| October 17, 1987 | Honolulu | United States | Blaisdell Arena | —N/a | —N/a |

== Personnel ==
- Jon Bon Jovi – lead vocals, guitar
- Richie Sambora – guitar, backing vocals, talkbox
- David Bryan – keyboards, piano, backing vocals
- Alec John Such – bass, backing vocals
- Tico Torres – drums, percussion
