= Edge of a Broken Heart (Bon Jovi song) =

Song by Bon Jovi

Song by Bon Jovi

from the album Disorderlies Original Soundtrack
- Released: 1987
- Recorded: 1986
- Genre: Glam metal; pop metal
- Length: 4:33
- Label: Mercury
- Songwriter(s): Jon Bon Jovi; Richie Sambora; Desmond Child
- Producer(s): Bruce Fairbairn

Bon Jovi singles chronology
"Never Say Goodbye" (1987)	"Edge of a Broken Heart" (1987)	"Bad Medicine" (1988)

"Edge of a Broken Heart" is a song by American rock band Bon Jovi. It was written during the making of the album Slippery When Wet, but was not included in the final cut or released as a single. It appeared on the soundtrack to the 1987 film Disorderlies, as well as on the B-side of the 12" version of hit singles "Livin' On A Prayer" and "Always".

== Overview ==
The song was not released as a commercially available single and did not chart on the Billboard Hot 100, but it did peak at #38 on the Hot 100 Airplay chart the week ending October 17, 1987.

The song was later included on the band's 100,000,000 Bon Jovi Fans Can't Be Wrong 2004 box set and was released as an iTunes single. The song was also released on the special double-CD edition of Cross Road.

== Chart performance ==
=== Briar version ===
Chart (1987)	Peak position
UK Singles (OCC)	95
