= Social disease =

Social disease may refer to:

- Social determinants of health
- "Social Disease", a song by Bon Jovi from Slippery When Wet
- "Social Disease", a song by Elton John from Goodbye Yellow Brick Road
- "Social Disease", an episode of the 2000 television series Doctors
- Social Disease, a novel by Paul Rudnick
- Social disease, a historic term used to refer to a sexually transmitted infection
