= Hard Times Come Easy =

Single by Richie Sambora

from the album Undiscovered Soul
- Released: 1998, February 23rd
- Genre: Rock
- Label: Mercury
- Songwriter(s): Richie Sambora; Richard Supa

Richie Sambora singles chronology
"Mr Bluesman (Solo by Eric Clapton)" (1991)	"Hard Times Come Easy" (1998)	"In It for Love" (1998)

Hard Times Come Easy is a song by American rock singer/guitarist Richie Sambora, released as the first single from his second solo album Undiscovered Soul in February 23 of 1998. The song charted at #39 on the Mainstream rock chart and #37 in the UK. The single featured a music video.

== Track listing ==
1. "Hard Times Come Easy' - 4:33
2. "Midnight Rider / Wanted Dead or Alive (Live)" - 7:54
3. "We All Sleep Alone (Live)" - 5:00
4. "Bad Medicine (Live)" - 5:06

Live tracks recorded live at Spreckles Theatre, San Diego.

== Charts ==
Hard Times Come Easy (1998)	Peak position
Germany (GfK)	74
UK Singles (OCC)	37
UK Rock Chart	2
US Mainstream Rock (Billboard)	39
US Billboard Heritage Rock	17
