= 100,000,000 Bon Jovi Fans Can't Be Wrong =

Box set by Bon Jovi
- Released: November 16, 2004
- Recorded: 1985–2003
- Length: 3:43:26
- Label: Island
- Producers: Patrick Leonard; Andy Johns; Jon Bon Jovi; Richie Sambora; Obie O'Brien

Bon Jovi chronology
This Left Feels Right (2003)	100,000,000 Bon Jovi Fans Can't Be Wrong (2004)	Have a Nice Day (2005)

Singles from 100,000,000 Bon Jovi Fans Can't Be Wrong
- 1. "The Radio Saved My Life Tonight" Released: 2004 (promo)

Professional ratings
Review scores
Source	Rating
Allmusic	4/5 stars
Entertainment Weekly	B
The Rolling Stone Album Guide	2.5/5 stars

100,000,000 Bon Jovi Fans Can't Be Wrong is a box set by Bon Jovi, released in 2004 through Island Records. A collection of demos and B-sides, it was released to celebrate the band's twentieth anniversary and their milestone of selling 100 million records worldwide.

== Content ==
The box set consists of 4 CDs, and also includes a DVD of the band talking about the tracks and additional archive candid footage of the band. Additionally, the Japanese version of the box set also includes a fifth CD. The box set charted at #53 on the Billboard 200.

Apart from songs released as iTunes singles "The Radio Saved My Life Tonight" was released as a promo CD single for the box set. The song was since played extensively on the band's following Have a Nice Day Tour.

The box set includes the songs "Real Life" and "Good Guys Don't Always Wear White" which were previously released as singles for soundtrack albums but never featured on a Bon Jovi album until now. "Edge of a Broken Heart" was also previously released for a soundtrack album and the Slippery When Wet 2-CD Special Edition Bonus CD (PHCR-90015/6) in 1998.

The album title and the cover art is a play on the 1959 Elvis Presley compilation 50,000,000 Elvis Fans Can't Be Wrong.

== Track listing ==
Disc one
No.	Title	Writer(s)	Length
1.	"Why Aren't You Dead?" (unreleased demo, 1994)	Jon Bon Jovi, Richie Sambora, Desmond Child	3:31
2.	"The Radio Saved My Life Tonight" (unreleased demo, 1992)	Bon Jovi, Sambora	5:08
3.	"Taking It Back" (unreleased demo, 1992)	Bon Jovi, Sambora	4:17
4.	"Someday I'll Be Saturday Night" (original demo, 1994)	Bon Jovi, Sambora, Child	5:18
5.	"Miss Fourth of July" (unreleased demo, 1992)	Bon Jovi	5:40
6.	"Open All Night (#2)" (unreleased demo, 1994; not the same song from Bounce)	Bon Jovi, Sambora, Eric Bazilian	5:47
7.	"These Arms Are Open All Night" (unreleased demo, 1998; performed by JBJ & The Big Dogs)	Bon Jovi, Billy Falcon	5:20
8.	"I Get a Rush" (unreleased demo, 1996)	Bon Jovi, Child, Bazilian	2:57
9.	"Someday Just Might Be Tonight" (unreleased demo, 1996)	Bon Jovi, Sambora, Mark Hudson	4:13
10.	"Thief of Hearts" (unreleased studio track, 2003)	Bon Jovi, Patrick Leonard	4:17
11.	"Last Man Standing" (unreleased studio track, 2003; alternate version appears on Have a Nice Day)	Bon Jovi, Falcon	4:32
12.	"I Just Want to Be Your Man" (unreleased demo, 1994)	Bon Jovi	3:28
Total length:			54:28

Disc two
No.	Title	Writer(s)	Length
1.	"Garageland" (unreleased demo, 1999)	Jon Bon Jovi, Richie Sambora	3:26
2.	"Starting All Over Again" (Japan bonus track on Keep the Faith, but an alternate recording is featured on this box set, 1992)	Bon Jovi, Sambora, Desmond Child	3:44
3.	"Maybe Someday" (unreleased demo, 1999)	Bon Jovi, Sambora	4:43
4.	"Last Chance Train" (unreleased demo, 1998)	Bon Jovi, Mark Hudson	4:31
5.	"The Fire Inside" (unreleased demo, 1994)	Bon Jovi	4:50
6.	"Every Beat of My Heart" (unreleased demo, 1992)	Bon Jovi, Sambora	4:49
7.	"Rich Man Living in a Poor Man's House" (unreleased demo, 1998)	Bon Jovi, David A. Stewart	4:22
8.	"The One That Got Away" (unreleased demo, 1999; intended for Kevin Costner's Message in a Bottle)	Bon Jovi, Sambora	4:48
9.	"You Can Sleep While I Dream" (unreleased demo, 1999)	Bon Jovi, Hudson, Dean Grakal	4:53
10.	"Outlawed of Love" (unreleased demo, officially from 1992)	Bon Jovi, Sambora	3:20
11.	"Good Guys Don't Always Wear White" (from the motion picture soundtrack to The Cowboy Way, 1994)	Bon Jovi, Sambora	4:29
12.	"We Rule the Night" (unreleased demo, 1985)	Bon Jovi, Sambora	4:09
Total length:			52:04

Disc three
No.	Title	Writer(s)	Length
1.	"Edge of a Broken Heart" (from the motion picture soundtrack to Disorderlies, 1986)	Jon Bon Jovi, Richie Sambora, Desmond Child	4:36
2.	"Sympathy" (unreleased demo, 1992)	Bon Jovi, Sambora	5:23
3.	"Only in My Dreams" (featuring Tico Torres on vocals; unreleased demo, 1994)	Bon Jovi	5:07
4.	"Shut Up and Kiss Me" (unreleased demo, 1997; performed by JBJ & The Big Dogs)	Bon Jovi, Sambora, Child	2:47
5.	"Crazy Love" (unreleased demo, 1998)	Bon Jovi, Mark Hudson, David A. Stewart	4:25
6.	"Lonely at the Top" (remixed version of B-side, 1995)	Bon Jovi, Sambora	3:51
7.	"Ordinary People" (international B-side of "Say It Isn't So", 2000)	Bon Jovi	4:07
8.	"Flesh and Bone" (unreleased demo, 1994)	Bon Jovi, Sambora, David Bryan	5:01
9.	"Satellite" (unreleased demo, 1999)	Bon Jovi, Sambora, Child	4:56
10.	"If I Can't Have Your Love" (featuring Richie Sambora on vocals – outtake from Stranger in This Town, 1991)	Sambora, Child, Diane Warren	4:15
11.	"Real Life" (from the motion picture soundtrack to EDtv; unreleased remix, 1999)	Bon Jovi, Child	3:52
12.	"Memphis Lives in Me" (featuring David Bryan on vocals; unreleased from the original musical Memphis, 2003)	Bryan, Joe DiPietro	3:03
13.	"Too Much of a Good Thing" (unreleased demo, 1999)	Bon Jovi, Sambora, Richie Supa	4:23
Total length:			55:46

Disc four
No.	Title	Writer(s)	Length
1.	"Love Ain't Nothing But a Four Letter Word" (unreleased studio recording, 1992)	Jon Bon Jovi, Richie Sambora, David Bryan	4:14
2.	"Love Ain't Nothing But a Four Letter Word" (original demo, 1992)	Bon Jovi	4:08
3.	"River Runs Dry" (unreleased demo, 1996)	Bon Jovi, Desmond Child	3:57
4.	"Always" (unreleased demo, 1994)	Bon Jovi	5:46
5.	"Kidnap an Angel" (unreleased demo, 1999)	Bon Jovi, Billy Falcon	5:56
6.	"Breathe" (B-side, 2002)	Bon Jovi, Sambora, Marti Frederiksen	3:40
7.	"Out of Bounds" (unreleased demo, 1986)	Bon Jovi, Sambora	3:46
8.	"Letter to a Friend" (unreleased demo, 1994)	Bon Jovi	4:19
9.	"Temptation" (alternate version of international B-side to "It's My Life", 2000)	Bon Jovi	4:23
10.	"Gotta Have a Reason" (unreleased demo, 1993)	Bon Jovi, Sambora, Michael Kamen	4:59
11.	"All I Wanna Do Is You" (unreleased demo, 1997)	Bon Jovi, Sambora	3:03
12.	"Billy" (unreleased demo, 1992)	Bon Jovi, Sambora	4:32
13.	"Nobody's Hero" (unreleased demo, 1994)	Bon Jovi, Sambora	4:33
14.	"Livin' on a Prayer" (original demo, 1986; hidden track)	Bon Jovi, Sambora, Child	3:52
Total length:			61:08

Disc five (Japan bonus disc)
No.	Title	Writer(s)	Length
1.	"With a Little Help from My Friends" (live, B-side, 1995)	John Lennon, Paul McCartney	6:16
2.	"Love Is War" (B-side of "Living in Sin" single, 1989)	Jon Bon Jovi, Richie Sambora	4:15
3.	"Borderline" (B-side and Japan-only single, 1986)	Bon Jovi, David Bryan	4:10
4.	"Hush" (B-side of "It's My Life" single, 2000)	Bon Jovi	3:45
5.	"I Wish Everyday Could Be Like Christmas" (B-side of "Keep the Faith" single, 1992)	Bon Jovi	4:28
6.	"Save a Prayer" (Keep the Faith Japan bonus track, 1992)	Bon Jovi, Sambora	5:56
7.	"Fields of Fire" (Keep the Faith-era demo from the These Days European 2-disc special edition, 1996)	Bon Jovi	4:10
8.	"Another Reason to Believe" (B-side of "Everyday" single, 2002)	Bon Jovi, Sambora, Billy Falcon, Jeffrey Steele	3:29
9.	"Let's Make It Baby" (New Jersey-era demo from the These Days European 2-disc special edition, 1996)	Bon Jovi, Sambora, Child	6:20
10.	"The End" (B-side, 1995)	Bon Jovi, Sambora, Bryan	3:37
Total length:			46:26

== Best of the Boxset (single disc version) ==
The Best of the Boxset compilation album (a 10 track sampler) is very rare but available. It features the 10 best tracks from all the CDs of the box set on one single CD.

=== Track listing ===
Disc one
No.	Title	Writer(s)	Length
1.	"The Radio Saved My Life Tonight" (Unreleased demo, 1992)	Jon Bon Jovi, Richie Sambora	5:08
2.	"Why Aren't You Dead?" (Unreleased demo, 1994)	Bon Jovi, Sambora, Desmond Child	3:31
3.	"I Get a Rush" (Unreleased demo, 1996)	Bon Jovi, Sambora, Child	2:57
4.	"Open All Night (#2)" (Unreleased demo, 1994, not the same song from Bounce)	Bon Jovi, Sambora, Eric Bazilian	5:47
5.	"Love Ain't Nothing But a Four Letter Word" (Unreleased studio recording, 1992)	Bon Jovi, Sambora, David Bryan	4:14
6.	"Breathe" (International B-side, 2002)	Bon Jovi, Sambora, Marti Frederiksen	3:40
7.	"Lonely at the Top" (International B-side, 1995)	Bon Jovi, Sambora	3:51
8.	"Thief of Hearts" (Unreleased studio track, 2003)	Bon Jovi, Patrick Leonard	4:17
9.	"Edge of a Broken Heart" (from the motion picture soundtrack to Disorderlies, 1986)	Bon Jovi, Sambora, Child	4:36
10.	"Taking It Back" (Unreleased demo, 1992)	Bon Jovi, Sambora	4:17
Total length:			42:18

== Personnel ==
- Jon Bon Jovi – lead vocals, acoustic guitar
- Richie Sambora – lead guitar, backing vocals, talk box
- David Bryan – keyboards, backing vocals
- Hugh McDonald – bass, backing vocals
- Alec John Such – bass, backing vocals
- Tico Torres – drums, percussion, backing vocals

Additional musicians

- Bobby Bandiera – rhythm guitar, backing vocals

== Charts ==
Chart (2004)	Peak position
Austrian Albums (Ö3 Austria)	50
Dutch Albums (Album Top 100)	40
German Albums (Offizielle Top 100)	37
Scottish Albums (Official Charts)	84
UK Albums (Official Charts)	90
US Billboard 200	53

== Certifications ==
Region	Certification	Certified units/sales
United States (RIAA)	Gold	500,000^{^}
^{^} Shipments figures based on certification alone.
