= Slippery When Wet =

Studio album by Bon Jovi
- Released: August 18, 1986
- Recorded: January - July 1986
- Studios: Little Mountain Sound (Vancouver, Canada)
- Genres: Glam metal; arena rock; hard rock; pop rock
- Length: 43:49
- Labels: Mercury (NA); Vertigo (WW)
- Producer: Bruce Fairbairn

Bon Jovi chronology
7800° Fahrenheit (1985)	Slippery When Wet (1986)	New Jersey (1988)

Alternative cover
- Rejected wet T-shirt cover, used for the Japanese release

Singles from Slippery When Wet
- 1. "You Give Love a Bad Name" Released: July 23, 1986; 2. "Livin' on a Prayer" Released: October 31, 1986; 3. "Wanted Dead or Alive" Released: March 2, 1987; 4. "Never Say Goodbye" Released: June 15, 1987

Slippery When Wet is the third studio album by American rock band Bon Jovi, released on August 18, 1986, by Mercury Records in North America and Vertigo Records internationally. It was produced by Bruce Fairbairn, with recording sessions taking place between January and July 1986 at Little Mountain Sound Studios in Vancouver. The album features many of Bon Jovi's best-known songs, including "You Give Love a Bad Name", "Livin' on a Prayer", and "Wanted Dead or Alive", resulting in the first glam metal album to have 3 top 10 hits on the Billboard Hot 100 chart. To promote the album, Bon Jovi embarked on the Slippery When Wet Tour, which ran from July 1986 to October 1987.

Slippery When Wet was an instant commercial success, spending eight weeks at No. 1 on the U.S. Billboard 200 chart and was named by Billboard as the top-selling album of 1987. Slippery When Wet is Bon Jovi's best-selling album to date, with a Recording Industry Association of America (RIAA) certification of 15× Platinum, making it one of the top 100 best-selling albums in the United States and worldwide. It has been called the album that turned "heavy metal into a radio-friendly pop format", and is also commonly seen as "a breakthrough for hair metal".

== Background ==
Upon its 1985 release, 7800° Fahrenheit achieved moderate success, but Bon Jovi had not yet become superstars. The band changed its approach for the next album, with a more mainstream sound than the heavier first two albums. Hiring Desmond Child as a collaborator, the band wrote 30 songs and auditioned them for local New Jersey and New York teenagers, basing the album's running order on their opinions. Bruce Fairbairn was chosen as the producer for the album, with Bob Rock as the mixer. The 1985 album Without Love which Fairbairn produced for the heavy metal band Black 'n Blue, attracted Jon Bon Jovi with its sound quality, and he immediately sought out the producer.

== Writing and composition ==
Much of the album was written by Jon Bon Jovi and Richie Sambora, whereas "You Give Love a Bad Name", "Livin' on a Prayer", "Without Love", and "I'd Die For You" were co-written by the duo with Desmond Child, and "Wild in the Streets" was by Jon Bon Jovi alone. This was the first time Desmond worked with Jon and Richie. He came to New Jersey, where they worked on the four songs in Sambora's mother's basement.

Jon Bon Jovi explained, "I liked what Bryan Adams had done with Tina Turner so I suggested we do something similar: I write a song for someone like her, and then we do the song together. But that got changed, and our A&R guy came up with Desmond's name ... He hasn't tried to change what we are, but to refine it slightly; to suggest extra ways that we could wring a bit more out of what we had."

Jon Bon Jovi was initially reluctant to include "Livin' on a Prayer", believing it was not good enough. Sambora convinced him it was a hit in the making, and so the band rerecorded it, releasing the second version on the album. It is Bon Jovi's signature song. The first version of "Livin' on a Prayer" that was recorded was included as a hidden track at the end of one of the CDs in the box set 100,000,000 Bon Jovi Fans Can't Be Wrong.

One of the songs written by the trio during the making of the album, "Edge of a Broken Heart", is not on the final release. In the booklet that came with 100,000,000 Bon Jovi Fans Can't Be Wrong, Jon Bon Jovi said, "It was absolutely appropriate for the Slippery record—coulda, shoulda, woulda been on Slippery had cooler minds prevailed. Here's my formal apology." Featured on the soundtrack to the 1987 movie Disorderlies, it has since been released as the B-side of the 12" versions of the singles "Livin' on a Prayer" and "Always", on the 2-CD edition of Cross Road, and on 100,000,000 Bon Jovi Fans Can't Be Wrong. The song has never been performed live by the band, though a fan favorite.

In 1986, Jon Bon Jovi said "There's a song called 'Love Is A Social Disease' that Aerosmith were keen to get hold of. It would be ideal for them, but they're not having it, because it's even better for us."

A song titled "Borderline" was co-written by Jon Bon Jovi and David Bryan for the album, but was released only in Japan as a single and EP.

== Title and artwork ==
The album's name was changed during its inception, including Wanted Dead or Alive. A proposed cover with the band dressed as cowboys was later used for the single release of the track of the same name.

According to Jon Bon Jovi, the band named the album Slippery When Wet after visiting The No.5 Orange strip club in Vancouver, British Columbia. According to Sambora, "This woman descended from the ceiling on a pole and proceeded to take all her clothes off. When she got in a shower and soaped herself up, we just about lost our tongues. We just sat there and said, 'We will be here every day.' That energized us through the whole project. Our testosterone was at a very high level back then."

The cover consists of a wet black garbage bag with the words "Slippery When Wet" traced in the water. "So simple, and not very impressive", said Sambora. The album originally was to feature a busty woman in a wet yellow T-shirt with the album name on the front of the shirt. This was swapped for the plastic bag cover just prior to release. The reasons given for the switch were record executives' fears that dominant record store chains at the time would have refused to carry the album with a sexist cover, and Jon Bon Jovi's dislike of the bright pink border around the photograph the band submitted. Sambora said, "Our label freaked out a bit when they saw what we'd done. They thought it would be banned by American stores, so we had to come up with something else – fast." In Japan, most releases of the album included the original cover art.

== Reception ==
Retrospective professional ratings
Review scores
Source	Rating
AllMusic	4.5/5 stars
Christgau's Record Guide	B−
Record Mirror	3/5 stars
The Rolling Stone Album Guide	3.5/5 stars

The album was a massive commercial success. Between 1986 and 1987, Slippery When Wet produced a string of hit songs, including three Top 10 Billboard Hot 100 hits, two of which ("You Give Love a Bad Name" and "Livin' on a Prayer") reached No. 1. The third single "Wanted Dead or Alive" peaked at No. 7. The album peaked at No. 1 on the Billboard 200, making it Bon Jovi's first number-one album in the United States. The album spent 38 weeks inside the Top 5 of Billboard 200, including 8 weeks at No. 1. It is the best-selling album of 1987 in the United States, and eventually reached Diamond certification by the RIAA and current sales stand at 15 million copies, making it one of the best-selling albums in the United States. In the UK, Slippery When Wet received a 3× Platinum certification by the BPI. The album also achieved Diamond status in Canada, and 6× Platinum status in Australia. This international success makes it one of the best-selling albums worldwide as well.

Slippery When Wet was met with generally positive reviews. Writing in The Village Voice in September 1987, Robert Christgau said, "Sure seven million teenagers can be wrong, but their assent is not without a certain documentary satisfaction. Yes, it proves that youth rebellion is toothless enough to simulate and market. But who the hell thought youth was dangerous in the current vacuum? Would you have preferred the band market patriotism? And are you really immune to 'Livin' on a Prayer'?" In 1990 in Rolling Stone, Jimmy Guterman thoroughly berated the band and the album. "Jon Bon Jovi and his band serve up condescending sentiment, reducing every emotional statement to a barefaced cliché – either because they think that's all their audience can comprehend or because that's all they can comprehend. On Slippery When Wet, Bon Jovi sounds like bad fourth-generation metal, a smudgy Xerox of Quiet Riot." The album is ranked 44th in the Rock and Roll Hall of Fame's list of the Definitive 200 Albums of all time.

== 2005 re-release ==
In 2005, Slippery When Wet was re-issued as a DualDisc. The CD side contains a newly remastered version. The DVD side contains the same album in its original stereo mix, a slightly expanded 5.1 surround sound version, and all 5 music videos. The expanded album includes additional elements within many of the songs, in some cases increasing their runtime. The DualDisc was released on September 20, 2005, the same release date as Have a Nice Day.

== Track listing ==
=== Original release ===
All tracks written by Jon Bon Jovi and Richie Sambora, except where noted.

Side A
No.	Title	Writer(s)	Length
1.	"Let It Rock"		5:26
2.	"You Give Love a Bad Name"	Bon Jovi; Sambora; Desmond Child	3:43
3.	"Livin' on a Prayer"	Bon Jovi; Sambora; Child	4:11
4.	"Social Disease"		4:18
5.	"Wanted Dead or Alive"		5:09

Side B
No.	Title	Writer(s)	Length
1.	"Raise Your Hands"		4:17
2.	"Without Love"	Bon Jovi; Sambora; Child	3:31
3.	"I'd Die for You"	Bon Jovi; Sambora; Child	4:31
4.	"Never Say Goodbye"		4:49
5.	"Wild in the Streets"	Bon Jovi	3:56

1998 Special Edition bonus CD (PHCR-90015/6)
No.	Title	Writer(s)	Length
1.	"Wanted Dead or Alive" (live at Wembley 1995)		8:06
2.	"Livin' on a Prayer" (live/US 1987)	Bon Jovi; Sambora; Child	5:05
3.	"You Give Love a Bad Name" (live/US 1987)	Bon Jovi; Sambora; Child	3:43
4.	"Wild in the Streets" (live at Wembley 1995)	Bon Jovi	4:55
5.	"Borderline" (studio outtake)	Bon Jovi; David Bryan	4:12
6.	"Edge of a Broken Heart" (studio outtake)	Bon Jovi; Sambora; Child	4:36
7.	"Never Say Goodbye" (live acoustic version)		5:30

2010 Special Edition bonus tracks
No.	Title	Writer(s)	Length
11.	"You Give Love a Bad Name" (live version)	Bon Jovi; Sambora; Child	4:10
12.	"Livin' on a Prayer" (live version)	Bon Jovi; Sambora; Child	5:33
13.	"Wanted Dead or Alive" (live version)		5:22
Total length:			58:57

2024 Deluxe Edition Disc 2 bonus tracks
No.	Title	Length
1.	"Wanted Dead or Alive" (Acoustic version)	5:32
2.	"Livin' on a Prayer" (Alternate mix, from Thank You, Goodnight: The Bon Jovi Story)	4:59
3.	"Raise Your Hands" (Extended version, Obie O'Brien mix)	5:38
4.	"Wild in the Streets" (Live at Cincinnati Gardens, March 18, 1987)	5:10
5.	"Livin' on a Prayer" (Live at Cobo Arena, March 11, 1987)	6:16
6.	"Wanted Dead or Alive" (Live at Cobo Arena, March 11, 1987)	8:26
7.	"Let It Rock" (Live at Nassau Coliseum, April 7, 1987)	11:58

== Personnel ==
Personnel per Slippery When Wet liner notes, except where noted.

Bon Jovi

- Jon Bon Jovi – lead and backing vocals
- Richie Sambora – electric & acoustic guitars, guitar synths, talk box, backing vocals
- David Bryan – keyboards, backing vocals, "various noises"
- Alec John Such – bass, backing vocals
- Tico Torres – drums, percussion

Additional musicians

- Tom Keenlyside – saxophone
- Hugh McDonald – bass on "Livin' on a Prayer" (uncredited)
- Joani Bye – backing vocals on "Livin' on a Prayer" (uncredited)
- Nancy Nash – backing vocals on "Livin' on a Prayer" (uncredited)
- Mike Reno – possible backing vocals on "Livin' on a Prayer" (uncredited)

Production

- Bruce Fairbairn – producer, horns, percussion
- Bob Rock – engineering, mixing
- Tim Crich – assistant engineering
- George Marino – digital remastering
- Bill Levy – artwork, art direction
- Mark Weiss – photography
- George Corsillo – design

== Charts ==
=== Weekly charts ===
Weekly chart performance for Slippery When Wet
Chart (1986–1988)	Peak position
Australian Albums (Kent Music Report)	1
Austrian Albums (Ö3 Austria)	2
Canada Top Albums/CDs (RPM)	1
Dutch Albums (Album Top 100)	5
Finnish Albums (Suomen virallinen lista)	1
German Albums (Offizielle Top 100)	11
Greek Albums (IFPI)	64
Japanese Albums (Oricon)	10
New Zealand Albums (RMNZ)	1
Norwegian Albums (VG-lista)	1
Spanish Albums (AFYVE)	8
Swedish Albums (Sverigetopplistan)	3
Swiss Albums (Schweizer Hitparade)	1
UK Albums (Official Charts)	6
US Billboard 200	1

Chart (1991)	Peak position
US Top Catalog Albums (Billboard)	3

Chart (1994–1996)	Peak position
Scottish Albums (Official Charts)	67
UK Rock & Metal Albums (Official Charts)	9

Chart (2021)	Peak position
Belgian Albums (Ultratop Flanders)	198

=== Year-end charts ===
Year-end chart performance for Slippery When Wet
Chart (1986)	Position
Canada Top Albums/CDs (RPM)	58
European Albums (European Top 100 Albums)	99

Chart (1987)	Position
Australian Albums (Kent Music Report)	3
Austrian Albums (Ö3 Austria)	10
Canada Top Albums/CDs (RPM)	2
Dutch Albums (Album Top 100)	22
European Albums (European Top 100 Albums)	7
German Albums (Offizielle Top 100)	14
New Zealand Albums (RMNZ)	3
Swiss Albums (Schweizer Hitparade)	4
US Billboard 200	1

Chart (1988)	Position
US Billboard 200	98

Chart (2002)	Position
Canadian Metal Albums (Nielsen SoundScan)	100

=== Decade-end charts ===
Decade-end chart performance for Slippery When Wet
Chart (1980–1989)	Position
Australian Albums (Kent Music Report)	25

== Certifications and sales ==
Region	Certification	Certified units/sales
Australia (ARIA)	6× Platinum	420,000^{^}
Austria (IFPI Austria)	Gold	25,000^{*}
Brazil	—	100,000
Canada (Music Canada)	Diamond	1,000,000^{^}
Denmark (IFPI Danmark)	Platinum	20,000^{‡}
Finland (Musiikkituottajat)	Platinum	73,564
France	—	38,000
Germany (BVMI)	Platinum	500,000^{^}
Hong Kong (IFPI Hong Kong)	Gold	10,000^{*}
Italy (FIMI)	Platinum	50,000^{‡}
Japan (Oricon Charts)	—	215,000
Malaysia	—	10,000
Netherlands (NVPI)	Platinum	100,000^{^}
New Zealand (RMNZ)	3× Platinum	45,000^{‡}
Norway (IFPI Norway)	Gold	50,000
Singapore (RIAS)	Gold	5,000^{*}
Spain (Promusicae)	Platinum	100,000^{^}
Sweden	—	100,000
Switzerland (IFPI Switzerland)	2× Platinum	100,000^{^}
United Kingdom (BPI)	3× Platinum	900,000^{^}
United States (RIAA)	15× Platinum	15,000,000^{‡}
^{*} Sales figures based on certification alone.^{^} Shipments figures based on certification alone.^{‡} Sales+streaming figures based on certification alone.

== Accolades ==
Publication	Country	Accolade	Rank
Guitar World	US	Top 20 Hair Metal Albums of the Eighties	7
LA Weekly	US	Top 20 Hair Metal Albums of All Time	12
Loudwire	US	Top 30 Hair Metal Albums	5
Metal Rules	US	Top 50 Glam Metal Albums	13
Rolling Stone	US	50 Greatest Hair Metal Albums of All Time	3
Loudwire	US	The Best Hard Rock Album of Each Year Since 1970	1

== See also ==
- List of best-selling albums
- List of best-selling albums in the United States
- List of glam metal albums and songs
