= Undiscovered Soul =

Studio album by Richie Sambora
- Released: February 23, 1998
- Recorded: 1997/1998
- Studio: Ocean Way Recording (Hollywood, California); Record One, Record Plant and Chomsky Ranch (Los Angeles, California); Mix This! (Pacific Palisades, California)
- Genre: Rock
- Length: 61:08
- Label: Mercury
- Producer: Don Was

Richie Sambora chronology
Stranger in This Town (1991)	Undiscovered Soul (1998)	Aftermath of the Lowdown (2012)

Singles from Undiscovered Soul
- 1. "Hard Times Come Easy" Released: 1998; 2. "In It for Love" Released: 1998; 3. "Undiscovered Soul" Released: 1998; 4. "Made in America" Released: 1998

Professional ratings
Review scores
Source	Rating
Allmusic	3/5 stars

Undiscovered Soul is the second solo studio album from Richie Sambora the guitarist from New Jersey band Bon Jovi. The album was released on February 23, 1998, and is more experimental than his earlier release Stranger in This Town. The album was produced by Don Was.

== Release and promotion ==
The album charted at #174 on The Billboard 200 and #24 on the UK Albums Chart. The lead single "Hard Times Come Easy" charted at #39 on the Mainstream rock chart and #37 in the UK, the second single "In It for Love" charted at #58 on the UK Singles Chart. The title track "Undiscovered Soul" and "Made in America" were also released as singles.

Music videos were made for the first two singles.

== Track listing ==
No.	Title	Writer(s)	Length
1.	"Made in America"	Richie Sambora, Richard Supa	5:35
2.	"Hard Times Come Easy"	Sambora, Supa	4:35
3.	"Fallen From Graceland"	Sambora, David Bryan, Supa	5:40
4.	"If God Was a Woman"	Sambora, Bryan, Supa	4:02
5.	"All That Really Matters"	Sambora, Supa	4:19
6.	"You're Not Alone"	Sambora, Thomas Marolda	4:19
7.	"In It for Love"	Sambora, Supa	4:19
8.	"Chained"	Sambora, Marolda, Ernie White	3:27
9.	"Harlem Rain"	Sambora, Supa	5:02
10.	"Who I Am"	Sambora, Marti Frederiksen	7:09
11.	"Downside of Love"	Sambora, Bryan, Supa	5:27
12.	"Undiscovered Soul"	Sambora, Supa	7:14
Total length:			61:08

== 1997 Japanese Version ==
This version was released only in Japan and contains a slightly different running order and alternate versions of songs. This release features different artwork than the final 1998 album worldwide release.

No.	Title	Writer(s)	Length
1.	"Made in America"	Richie Sambora, Richard Supa	5:48
2.	"Hard Times Come Easy"	Sambora, Supa	4:36
3.	"Fallen From Graceland"	Sambora, David Bryan, Supa	6:49
4.	"You're Not Alone"	Sambora, Thomas Marolda	4:46
5.	"Undiscovered Soul"	Sambora, Supa	7:48
6.	"In It for Love"	Sambora, Supa	4:24
7.	"If God Was a Woman"	Sambora, Bryan, Supa	4:04
8.	"All That Really Matters"	Sambora, Supa	5:08
9.	"Chained"	Sambora, Marolda, Ernie White	3:31
10.	"Downside of Love"	Sambora, Bryan, Supa	5:28
11.	"Harlem Rain"	Sambora, Supa	5:46
12.	"Who I Am"	Sambora, Marti Frederiksen	7:07
13.	"All That Really Matters (Reprise)"	Sambora, Supa	5:08
Total length:			70:17

== 1998 Tour Edition ==
This Japan-only limited edition comes with a bonus CD including six live recordings. All the Tracks are from the San Diego show in 1992.

No.	Title	Writer(s)	Length
1.	"Bad Medicine"	Jon Bon Jovi, Richie Sambora, Desmond Child
2.	"We All Sleep Alone"	Bon Jovi, Sambora, Child
3.	"Midnight Rider/Wanted Dead or Alive"	Gregg Allman, Robert Kim Payne / Bon Jovi, Sambora
4.	"Stranger in This Town"	Sambora, David Bryan
5.	"I'll Be There for You"	Bon Jovi, Sambora
6.	"With a Little Help From My Friends"	John Lennon, Paul McCartney

== Personnel ==
=== Musicians ===
- Richie Sambora – lead vocals, backing vocals, electric guitars, acoustic guitars, arrangements
- Chuck Leavell – acoustic piano (1, 8), electric piano (1, 8)
- Rami Jaffee – Hammond B3 organ (1, 4, 6), accordion (2, 8), octaban (2, 8)
- Billy Preston – Hammond B3 organ (2, 8, 11), backing vocals (2, 8, 11)
- Jamie Muhoberac – synthesizer programming (3, 10, 12), "wild" sounds (3, 10, 12)
- Don Was – Wurlitzer electric piano (3, 10, 12), bass (3, 10, 12)
- David Paich – electric piano (5), synthesizers (5)
- Greg Phillinganes – grand piano (5), backing vocals (5)
- Robbie Buchanan – synthesizers (12)
- Mark Goldenberg – additional guitars (1, 2)
- Richard Supa – acoustic guitar (9), lead vocals (9)
- James "Hutch" Hutchinson – bass (1, 2, 4–6, 8, 11, 12), backing vocals (1, 2, 4–6, 8, 11, 12)
- Pino Palladino – fretless bass (7, 9)
- Kenny Aronoff – drums (1–8, 10–12), percussion (1, 2, 4–6, 8, 10–12)
- Paulinho da Costa – congas (3, 7), rattles (3, 7), shakers (3, 7), talking drum (3, 7)
- Steven Tyler (credited as Lippy La Rue) – harmonica (4)
- Wayne Hood – sequencing (9), string arrangements
- David Campbell – string arrangements
- Ed Cherney – backing vocals (2)
- Portia Griffin – backing vocals (3)
- Myrna Smith – backing vocals (3)
- Dave Amato – backing vocals (4)
- Sweet Pea Atkinson – backing vocals (7, 11)
- Harry Bowens – backing vocals (7, 11)
- Arnold McCuller – backing vocals (7, 11)

Handclaps on "Hard Times Come Easy"

- Kenny Aronoff, Bobby Deluca, Mark Goldenberg, Stephanie Heaton, "Hutch" Hutchinson, Rami Jaffee, Richie Sambora, Ted Turner, Dennis Walsh and Don Was

=== Production ===
- Alison Hamamura – A&R
- Don Was – producer
- Ed Cherney – recording, mixing (9)
- Rail Jon Rogut – recording, mixing (3, 11)
- Bob Clearmountain – mixing (1, 2, 4–8, 10, 12)
- Dan Bosworth – additional engineer
- Brad Haehnel – additional engineer
- James Saez – additional engineer
- John Anthony – assistant engineer
- Robie Banerji – assistant engineer
- Tom Banghart – assistant engineer
- Greg Burns – assistant engineer
- Jeff Burns – assistant engineer
- Greg Collins – assistant engineer
- Tim Lauber – assistant engineer
- Luis Quinn – assistant engineer
- Mike Scotella – assistant engineer
- Ron Boustead – editing
- Stephen Marcussen – mastering at Precision Mastering (Hollywood, California)
- Don C. Tyler – mastering assistant
- Bobby Deluca – technical assistant
- Pat Dorn – production coordinator
- Annie Belanger – production manager
- Jane Oppenheimer – production manager
- Stephanie Heaton – production manager
- Margery Greenspan – art direction
- Sandra Monteparo – design
- Dan Chavkin – photography
- Greg Allen – band and bottom photography
- Chris McCann – top photography
- Katie Agresta – vocal coach
- Lynn Bugal – stylist
- Helena Occhipinti – hair, make-up
- Liberty Dwyer, Nick Moyle, Neda Sarmast and Aggressive Entertainment – management

== Charts ==
=== Album ===
Chart (1998)	Peak position
Australian Albums (ARIA)	49
Austrian Albums (Ö3 Austria)	33
Finnish Albums (Suomen virallinen lista)	37
Dutch Albums (Album Top 100)	42
German Albums (Offizielle Top 100)	15
Scottish Albums (OCC)	36
Swedish Albums (Sverigetopplistan)	37
Swiss Albums (Schweizer Hitparade)	23
UK Albums (OCC)	24
UK Rock & Metal Albums (OCC)	1
US Billboard 200	174

=== Singles ===
Hard Times Come Easy (1998)	Peak position
Germany (GfK)	74
UK Singles (OCC)	37
UK Rock Chart	2
US Mainstream Rock (Billboard)	39
US Billboard Heritage Rock	17

In It for Love (1998)	Peak position
UK Singles (OCC)	58
