= Never Say Goodbye (Bon Jovi song) =

1987 single by Bon Jovi

Single by Bon Jovi

from the album Slippery When Wet
- Released: June 15, 1987
- Recorded: 1986
- Studio: Little Mountain (Vancouver, Canada)
- Genre: Glam metal
- Length: 4:50 (album version); 5:27 (DualDisc intro version)
- Label: Mercury
- Songwriters: Jon Bon Jovi; Richie Sambora
- Producer: Bruce Fairbairn

Bon Jovi singles chronology
"Wanted Dead or Alive" (1987)	"Never Say Goodbye" (1987)	"Bad Medicine" (1988)

Music video
- "Never Say Goodbye" on YouTube

"Never Say Goodbye" is a song by American rock band Bon Jovi, written by Jon Bon Jovi and Richie Sambora. It was a track off the band's third album, Slippery When Wet (1986), on June 15, 1987, and reached number 11 on the mainstream rock charts and number 21 on the UK Singles Chart. Because it was not released domestically as a commercially available single, "Never Say Goodbye" was ineligible to chart on the Billboard Hot 100. Nevertheless, it reached number 28 on the Hot 100 Airplay survey.

The song was featured on some versions of the band's Cross Road greatest hits album and is still occasionally performed live by the band in concert.

== Song style ==
"Never Say Goodbye" is a power ballad, featuring drawn-out vocals and a slow tempo, in contrast to the other tracks on Slippery When Wet, which is of a much faster, metal pace.

The song is in the key of A major and progresses to C♯ minor, D major, and D minor.

On one of the early demos and alternate takes that were made for this song, Richie Sambora sang lead vocals on only one of them while Jon Bon Jovi sang lead vocals on most of them.

== Track listings ==
- Original European release (August 13, 1987)
1. "Never Say Goodbye"
2. "Shot Through the Heart" (live)
- US and UK CD re-release
1. "Never Say Goodbye"
2. "Social Disease"
3. "Edge of a Broken Heart"
4. "Raise Your Hands"

== Charts ==
Chart (1987–1988)	Peak position
Australia (Kent Music Report)	26
Belgium (Ultratop 50 Flanders)	28
Ireland (IRMA)	4
Netherlands (Dutch Top 40 Tipparade)	11
Netherlands (Single Top 100)	59
New Zealand (Recorded Music NZ)	38
UK Singles (Official Charts)	21
US Hot 100 Airplay (Billboard)	28
US Mainstream Rock (Billboard)	11
