= Real Life (Bon Jovi song) =

1999 single by Bon Jovi

Single by Bon Jovi

from the album EDtv Original Soundtrack
- Released: March 2, 1999
- Length: 3:48
- Label: Reprise; Mercury
- Songwriters: Jon Bon Jovi; Desmond Child
- Producer: Bruce Fairbairn

Bon Jovi singles chronology
"Hey God" (1996)	"Real Life" (1999)	"It's My Life" (2000)

Music video
- "Real Life" on YouTube

"Real Life" is a song by American rock band Bon Jovi, released in March 1999. It is taken from the soundtrack of the film EDtv.

== Remix ==
A remix of the song is present on the 100,000,000 Bon Jovi Fans Can't Be Wrong boxset. It reached the top 40 on the Radio & Records Airplay chart. At the time Hugh McDonald was an unofficial member of the band and this marked the only time that the bassist featured on a Bon Jovi release's artwork until his promotion to being an official member, when he featured on the artwork for the band's 2016 single "This House Is Not for Sale".

== Track listings ==
"Keep the Faith" was recorded live at the Bon Jovi Christmas Concert at the Count Basie Theatre in Red Bank, New Jersey, in December 1992.

UK CD single

1. "Real Life" (radio mix)
2. "Keep the Faith" (live)
3. "Real Life" (instrumental)

UK cassette single

1. "Real Life" (radio mix) – 3:47
2. "Keep the Faith" (live) – 6:39

== Charts ==
Chart (1999)	Peak position
Australia (ARIA)	52
Austria (Ö3 Austria Top 40)	17
Belgium (Ultratip Bubbling Under Flanders)	4
Germany (GfK)	17
Italy Airplay (Music & Media)	6
Japan (Oricon)	43
Netherlands (Dutch Top 40)	31
Netherlands (Single Top 100)	36
Scottish Singles Sales (Official Charts)	19
Switzerland (Schweizer Hitparade)	22
UK Singles (Official Charts)	21
UK Rock & Metal (Official Charts)	1
US Pop Airplay (Billboard)	40

== Release history ==
Region	Date	Format(s)	Label(s)	Ref.
United States	March 2, 1999	Contemporary hit radio	Reprise; Mercury	
United Kingdom	March 29, 1999	CD	Reprise	
Japan	April 21, 1999	CD	Reprise	
