= Aftermath of the Lowdown =

Studio album by Richie Sambora
- Released: September 12, 2012
- Recorded: 2011–2012
- Studio: Ocean Way Recording, EastWest Studios and The Sound Factory (Hollywood, California); The Village Recorder (Los Angeles, California)
- Genre: Hard rock
- Length: 51:25
- Label: Dangerbird
- Producer: Luke Ebbin: Richie Sambora

Richie Sambora chronology
Undiscovered Soul (1998)	Aftermath of the Lowdown (2012)	Radio Free America (2018)

Singles from Aftermath of the Lowdown
- 1. "Every Road Leads Home to You" Released: 2012; 2. "I'll Always Walk Beside You" Released: 2012; 3. "Sugar Daddy" Released: 2012

Professional ratings
Review scores
Source	Rating
Allmusic	4/5 stars
NU.nl	4/5 stars

Aftermath of the Lowdown is the third solo studio album by Richie Sambora which was released in Japan on September 12, 2012, in the United Kingdom on September 17, and in the United States on September 18, 2012 as digital download and on September 25, 2012 as physical CD (digisleeve format). For the first time in his 30-year career, Sambora signed with an independent label, Dangerbird.

== Release and promotion ==
To promote the album, Sambora and his band appeared as the house band on The Late Late Show with Craig Ferguson for the first week in December 2012.

The album charted at No. 10 on the Top Hard Rock Albums chart, No. 34 on the Top Independent Albums chart, No. 149 on the Billboard 200 and No. 35 on the UK Albums Chart.

The track "Every Road Leads Home to You" was released as a single for the album and features a music video. The song is also featured as one of the bonus tracks on Bon Jovi's 2013 album What About Now. A special edition single, "I'll Always Walk Beside You'" featuring Alicia Keys was released as the second single of the album. All the profits from the sale of the special edition single goes to the ongoing recovery efforts of The Red Cross for the devastation from Hurricane Sandy. The track "Sugar Daddy" was released as a promo single and a music video was made for the song "Taking a Chance on the Wind".

A song named "Forgiveness Street" was thought to be planned as a bonus track on the Japan CD, but was later dropped.

== Editions ==
The worldwide version of the album features 11 tracks and the Japanese version features 12 tracks including "Backseat Driver" as a bonus track. There were 6 special packages for sale on Richie's official website:

- the physical digisleeve CD and the digital download;
- the physical digisleeve CD, the digital download, a Richie's T-shirt and a limited edition autographed lithography;
- a zip-up hoodie, the physical digisleeve CD, the digital download and a limited edition autographed lithography;
- the Limited Edition Deluxe Box Set, which features a 13 3/4 × 12 1/2-inch bonded leather smith sewn book with an embossed Richie Sambora image on the cover along with a 2-color foil stamp of Richie's custom guitar strap, the entire record over 3 sides of 180-gram vinyl, with the 4th side featuring an etching of the Richie Sambora silhouette, the compact disc, 16 pages of photography from famed photographer James Minchin as well as an autographed lithograph taken from those sessions and a Richie's T-shirt; in addition to the box set, this bundle includes the Richie Sambora zip-up hoodie.

== Track listing ==
From Dangerbird records.

All tracks are written by Richie Sambora and Luke Ebbin, except where noted.

No.	Title	Length
1.	"Burn that Candle Down"	4:23
2.	"Every Road Leads Home to You"	4:40
3.	"Taking a Chance on the Wind"	4:47
4.	"Nowadays"	4:00
5.	"Weathering the Storm" (Sambora, Bernie Taupin)	4:49
6.	"Sugar Daddy"	4:37
7.	"I'll Always Walk Beside You"	5:03
8.	"Seven Years Gone"	5:36
9.	"Learning How to Fly With a Broken Wing" (Sambora, Phil Cassens)	4:35
10.	"You Can Only Get So High" (Sambora, Cassens)	6:32
11.	"World" (Sambora, Bruce Foster)	2:22
Total length:		51:25

Japanese version
No.	Title	Length
11.	"Backseat Driver" (Japan Bonus Track)	4:12
12.	"World" (Sambora, Bruce Foster)	2:22
Total length:		55:37

== Personnel ==
- Richie Sambora – lead vocals, guitars
- Luke Ebbin – programming, keyboards, backing vocals
- Roger Joseph Manning, Jr. – keyboards
- Matt Rollings – acoustic piano, organ
- Rusty Anderson – additional guitars
- Curt Schneider – bass
- Aaron Sterling – drums, percussion

=== Production ===
- Phil Cassens – A&R
- Luke Ebbin – producer
- Richie Sambora – producer
- Bryan Cook – engineer
- Curt Schneider – engineer, mixing (4, 8, 9, 11)
- Chris Thompson – engineer, mixing (7)
- Tchad Blake – mixing (1, 6)
- Andrew Scheps – mixing (2, 3, 5, 10)
- Brendan Dekora – assistant engineer
- Eric Denniston – assistant engineer
- Rouble Kapoor – assistant engineer
- Scott Moore – assistant engineer
- Ben O'Neill – assistant engineer
- Vanessa Parr – assistant engineer
- David Schwerkolt – assistant engineer
- Wesley Seidman – assistant engineer
- Stephen Marcussen – mastering at Marcussen Mastering (Hollywood, California)
- Willy Donica – guitar technician
- Takumi Suetsugu – guitar technician
- Darren Craig – art direction
- James Minchin III – photography
- Joel Roman – management

== Charts ==
Chart (2012)	Peak position
Austrian Albums (Ö3 Austria)	45
Dutch Albums (Album Top 100)	20
German Albums (Offizielle Top 100)	38
Swiss Albums (Schweizer Hitparade)	74
UK Albums (OCC)	35
UK Independent Albums (OCC)	6
US Billboard 200	149
US Top Hard Rock Albums (Billboard)	10
US Independent Albums (Billboard)	34
