= Radio Free America (album) =

Studio album by RSO
- Released: May 11, 2018
- Genre: Pop rock, blues rock
- Length: 66:07
- Label: BMG Rights Management
- Producer: Bob Rock

RSO chronology
Making History (2017)	Radio Free America (2018)

Singles from Radio Free America
- 1. "Masterpiece" Released: September 28, 2017; 2. "Rise" Released: September 29, 2017; 3. "Walk With Me" Released: December 14, 2017; 4. "Making History" Released: December 15, 2017; 5. "One Night of Peace" Released: December 15, 2017; 6. "I Got You Babe/Forever All the Way" Released: February 9, 2018

Radio Free America is the debut studio album released by RSO, a duo featuring Bon Jovi ex-guitarist Richie Sambora and Australian guitarist Orianthi. The album was released May 11, 2018.

== Recording and production ==
Orianthi and Sambora recorded the album over two years, mostly in their Los Angeles home. The album was produced by Bob Rock (Mötley Crüe, Metallica, Bon Jovi). Sambora and Orianthi explore a wide variety of genres on the album, including rock, blues, pop, R&B and country. The album gathers together all of the duo's previously released singles and the 2017 EPs, Rise and Making History, along with more new tracks.

The duo originally released the single "Masterpiece", which premiered on Billboard on September 28, 2017 and in December 2017 they released "Walk With Me" and the holiday single "One Night of Peace".

In February 2018, Sambora and Orianthi released dual singles for Valentine's Day putting their spin on the Sonny & Cher song "I Got You Babe", and they also debuted a brand new RSO original "Forever All the Way".

== Track listing ==
Radio Free America track listing
No.	Title	Writer(s)	Length
1.	"Making History"	Bob Rock, Orianthi, Richie Sambora	4:30
2.	"We Are Magic"	Orianthi, Richie Sambora	4:13
3.	"Rise"	Michael Bearden, Orianthi, Richie Sambora	3:29
4.	"Take Me"	Bob Rock, Richie Sambora	4:36
5.	"Masterpiece"	Orianthi, Richie Sambora	3:56
6.	"Walk with Me"	Bob Rock, Orianthi, Richie Sambora	4:59
7.	"I Don't Want to Have to Need You Now"	Bob Rock, Orianthi, Richie Sambora	4:19
8.	"Truth"	Michael Bearden, Orianthi, Richie Sambora	3:59
9.	"Together on the Outside" (featuring Alice Cooper)	Bob Rock, Orianthi, Richie Sambora	4:16
10.	"Good Times" (featuring k-os)	Orianthi, Richie Sambora	3:25
11.	"Forever All the Way"	Richie Sambora	4:08
12.	"I Got You Babe"	Sonny Bono	3:00
13.	"One Night of Peace"	Richie Sambora	4:23
14.	"Blues Won't Leave Me Alone"	Orianthi, Richie Sambora	5:02
15.	"Hellbound Train"	Andy Sylvester, Kim Simmonds	8:52

== Personnel ==
- Richie Sambora – lead vocals, electric and acoustic guitars, talkbox, bass, keyboards, percussion
- Orianthi – lead vocals, background vocals, electric and acoustic guitars, bass (track 3), production (track 14)

== Charts ==
Chart performance for Radio Free America
Chart (2018)	Peak position
Scottish Albums (OCC)	95
UK Independent Albums (OCC)	19
