= Wanted Dead or Alive (Bon Jovi song) =

1987 single by Bon Jovi

Single by Bon Jovi

from the album Slippery When Wet
- B-side: "Never Say Goodbye"/"I'd Die For You"
- Released: March 2, 1987
- Recorded: 1986
- Studio: Little Mountain (Vancouver, British Columbia, Canada)
- Genre: Country rock; glam metal
- Length: 5:09 (album version); 4:09 (single and video version); 5:32 (acoustic version)
- Label: Mercury
- Songwriters: Jon Bon Jovi; Richie Sambora
- Producer: Bruce Fairbairn

Bon Jovi singles chronology
"Livin' on a Prayer" (1986)	"Wanted Dead or Alive" (1987)	"Never Say Goodbye" (1987)

Music video
- Wanted Dead or Alive on YouTube

Alternative cover
- European/Japanese Cover

"Wanted Dead or Alive" is a power ballad by American band Bon Jovi. It is from their 1986 album Slippery When Wet. The song was written by Jon Bon Jovi and Richie Sambora and was released in 1987, as the album's third single. During a February 20, 2008 encore performance in Detroit, Jon Bon Jovi told the crowd about running into Bob Seger at a Pistons game. As he introduced his song "Wanted Dead or Alive", he said it was inspired by Seger's "Turn the Page" hit and called the song the band's anthem. The song peaked at number 7 on the Billboard Hot 100 chart and number 13 on the Mainstream Rock Tracks chart, making it the third single from the album to reach the Top 10 of the Hot 100. As a result, Slippery When Wet was the first glam metal album to have 3 top 10 hits on the Billboard Hot 100.

In the 1989 MTV Video Music Awards, Jon Bon Jovi and Richie Sambora performed acoustic versions of this song and "Livin' on a Prayer". While MTV Unplugged was already in development by the time of this event, its showrunners have credited the pair's performance with influencing the show to go from initially being meant only for "young, up-and-coming artists" into being a simplified showcase for the "big, stadium, electric-arena-type acts".

In 2001 a live version from the album One Wild Night Live 1985–2001 was released as a single featuring a promotional music video. In 2003 a new version was released on the album This Left Feels Right and this version was also released as a single with a promotional video.

Considered to be one of the band's signature songs, it is the theme song for Discovery Channel's Deadliest Catch TV show. It was also featured in the movies Harley Davidson and the Marlboro Man, Scooby Doo 2: Monsters Unleashed, Wild Hogs and Rock of Ages. The song has been used in episodes of It's Always Sunny in Philadelphia, Supernatural, The Sopranos, Miami Vice, The Vampire Diaries and The Big Bang Theory.

The song was certified quadruple platinum by the Recording Industry Association of America (RIAA) in 2015.

== Background ==
The song's title pays homage to Jon's admiration for Old West heroes, and how he identifies with them as being hated and loved at the same time ("wanted dead or alive", so to speak). During an interview on Inside the Actors Studio, Jon said he got the inspiration for the song early one morning when he could not sleep while riding in a tour bus. The "lifestyle of every rock band" was similar to that of outlaws in that each was, "a young band of thieves, riding into town, stealing the money, the girls, and the booze before the sun came up."

Jon said during a concert in Detroit, Michigan, on February 20, 2008, that the song "absolutely positively was influenced by [Bob] Seger's 'Turn the Page'." Bon Jovi performed "Turn the Page" during a concert in Toronto, Ontario on July 21, 2010. Afterward, Jon told the audience he remembered listening to this song in 1985 while traveling on a tour bus in the midwest and telling Richie Sambora, "We got to write a song like this." The following year the duo composed "Wanted Dead or Alive".

Cash Box praised Bon Jovi's "convincing gravel-throated" vocal.

== Music video ==
The music video was directed by Wayne Isham and features footage from the band's Slippery When Wet Tour, including shots from Rochester, New York's War Memorial Auditorium; Chicago's UIC Pavilion; Rochester, Minnesota's Mayo Civic Center; Denver's McNichols Sports Arena; Pittsburgh's Fort Pitt Tunnel and skyline; Huntington, West Virginia's Huntington Civic Center; I64E View of Charleston, West Virginia Skyline crossing the Kanawha River; Oklahoma City and other venues. The video captures the life-on-the-road feeling, with several shots of the exhausted band members. The audio for the video uses the short (edited) version of the song.

In Bon Jovi's Slippery When Wet Special Edition, Jon and Richie perform the acoustic version of "Wanted Dead or Alive" live, and before singing they mention they wrote the song in Richie's mother's basement a year ago (1985 or 1986) and Richie says "Mom, this is for you" and Jon thanks her by saying "Thanks for Richie's mom for not doing the laundry the day we wrote this song, it's called 'Wanted Dead or Alive'". In this version, Richie and Jon take turns singing during the second and the last verse. The guitar solo is performed on one of Sambora's trademark multi-neck 12-string Ovation guitars, rather than switching to an electric guitar for the solo and last verse of the song.

== Reception ==
Les Claypool of Primus chose the song for The A.V. Club column "HateSong", where musicians choose songs they dislike. Claypool, who called the song a "wretched soundscape", reflected, "Bon Jovi was actually a big influence on Primus back in the day. Basically, the influence was that we wanted to make music that was the polar opposite of Bon Jovi." Jeff Tweedy of Wilco expressed similar disdain for the song, commenting, "This song sucks, and you should not like it."

== Track listings ==
Japan 7" Single (Mercury 888 482-7)
No.	Title	Writer(s)	Length
1.	"Wanted Dead or Alive"	Jon Bon Jovi, Richie Sambora	4:10
2.	"Shot Through the Heart"	Bon Jovi, Jack Ponti	4:24

Japan CD-Maxi (Mercury PPDM 1003)
No.	Title	Writer(s)	Length
1.	"Wanted Dead or Alive" (Single Version)	Jon Bon Jovi, Richie Sambora	5:11
2.	"Wanted Dead or Alive" (Acoustic)	Bon Jovi, Sambora	5:39
3.	"Wanted Dead or Alive" (Live)	Bon Jovi, Sambora	8:14
4.	"Edge of a Broken Heart"	Bon Jovi, Sambora, Desmond Child	7:25

Promo - 7" Single (Mercury 88 467-7 DJ)
No.	Title	Writer(s)	Length
1.	"Wanted Dead or Alive" (Long)	Jon Bon Jovi, Richie Sambora	5:07
2.	"Wanted Dead or Alive" (Short)	Bon Jovi, Sambora	4:10

CD Video (Mercury 422870721-2)
No.	Title	Writer(s)	Length
1.	"Never Say Goodbye"	Jon Bon Jovi, Richie Sambora	4:48
2.	"Wanted Dead or Alive"	Bon Jovi, Sambora	5:07
3.	"I'd Die for You"	Bon Jovi, Sambora, Desmond Child	4:31
4.	"Wanted Dead or Alive" (Acoustic)	Bon Jovi, Sambora	5:41
5.	"Wanted Dead or Alive" (Music video)	Bon Jovi, Sambora	4:08

CD-Single (Island Def Jam 588 718-2)
No.	Title	Writer(s)	Length
1.	"Wanted Dead or Alive (Live)" (Recorded Live on September 20, 2000, New York City, NY)	Jon Bon Jovi, Richie Sambora
2.	"Thank You for Loving Me" (Recorded Live Acoustic on December 6, 2000, TMF Cafe, The Music Factory, Bussum, The Netherlands)

Limited Edition Promo - CD-Single (Island 440 011 172-4)
No.	Title	Writer(s)	Length
1.	"Wanted Dead or Alive" (Live)	Jon Bon Jovi, Richie Sambora	3:43
2.	"The Distance" (Live at the Yokohama Arena, Japan, January 29th 2003)	Bon Jovi, Sambora	5:54

== Charts ==
=== Original version ===
Chart (1987)	Peak position
Australia (Kent Music Report)	13
Belgium (Ultratop 50 Flanders)	36
Canada (RPM)	17
Ireland (IRMA)	6
Netherlands (Dutch Top 40)	24
Netherlands (Single Top 100)	20
New Zealand (Recorded Music NZ)	5
UK Singles (Official Charts)	13
US Billboard Hot 100	7
US Album Rock Tracks	13
West Germany (GfK)	47

Chart (2007)	Peak position
US Digital Song Sales (Billboard)	25

=== 2000 live version ===
Chart (2000–01)	Peak position
Germany (Media Control AG)	45
Netherlands (Mega Single Top 100)	26

=== Year-end charts ===
Chart (1987)	Position
Australia (Kent Music Report)	82
US Billboard Hot 100	74

== Certifications ==
Region	Certification	Certified units/sales
Australia (ARIA)	4× Platinum	280,000^{‡}
New Zealand (RMNZ)	2× Platinum	60,000^{‡}
United Kingdom (BPI)	Platinum	600,000^{‡}
United States (RIAA)	6× Platinum	6,000,000^{‡}
^{‡} Sales+streaming figures based on certification alone.

== Accolades ==
Publication	Country	Accolade	Rank
The New York Times	US	15 Essential Hair-Metal Videos	5

== See also ==
- List of glam metal albums and songs
