= Ballad of Youth =

Single by Richie Sambora

from the album Stranger in This Town
- Released: August 19, 1991
- Genre: Rock
- Length: 3:52
- Label: Mercury
- Songwriters: Richie Sambora; Tom Marolda

Richie Sambora singles chronology
"Ballad of Youth" (1991)	"One Light Burning" (1991)

"Ballad of Youth" is a song by American rock singer and guitarist Richie Sambora. Released on 1991 as the lead single from his debut solo album, Stranger in This Town. The song reached number 63 on the U.S. Billboard Hot 100 and number 59 on the UK. The single was accompanied by a music video.

== Track listing ==
12-inch single (UK) (MERX350 – fold-out poster sleeve)

1. "Ballad of Youth"
2. "Wind Cries Mary"
3. "Rest In Peace"

== Charts ==
Chart performance for "Ballad of Youth"
Chart (1991)	Peak position
Australia (ARIA)	25
Canada Singles (RPM)	67
UK Singles (OCC)	59
US Billboard Hot 100	63
US Mainstream Rock (Billboard)	13
