= Rise (RSO EP) =

EP by RSO
- Released: September 29, 2017
- Recorded: 2017
- Genre: Hard rock, blues rock, country rock
- Length: 19:23
- Label: BMG Rights Management (US) LLC

RSO chronology
Rise (2017)	Making History (2017)

Singles from Rise
- 1. "Masterpiece" Released: 29 September 2017

Rise is the first EP by RSO, which consists of Orianthi and Richie Sambora. The EP was released on September 29, 2017.

== Track listing ==
All tracks are written by Richie Sambora, Orianthi.

No.	Title	Length
1.	"Rise"	3:28
2.	"Masterpiece"	3:56
3.	"Truth"	3:56
4.	"Take Me"	4:36
5.	"Good Times"	3:25
Total length:		19:23

Bonus tracks
No.	Title	Length
6.	"Good Times (Reggae Mix)" (RSO website exclusive)
