= Stranger in This Town =

Studio album by Richie Sambora
- Released: September 3, 1991
- Studio: A&M Studios (Hollywood, California); Marathon Studios, Right Track Recording and Skyline Studios (New York City, New York); City Lights Recording Studios (Farmingdale, New Jersey)
- Genre: Hard rock, blues rock
- Length: 52:11
- Label: Mercury
- Producer: Richie Sambora; Neil Dorfsman

Richie Sambora chronology
| Stranger in This Town (1991) | Undiscovered Soul (1998) |

Singles from Stranger in This Town
- 1. "Ballad of Youth" Released: 1991; 2. "One Light Burning" Released: 1991; 3. "Stranger in This Town" Released: 1991; 4. "Mr Bluesman (Solo by Eric Clapton)" Released: 1991

Professional ratings
Review scores
| Source | Rating |
|---|---|
| AllMusic | 4.5/5 stars |

Stranger in This Town is the first solo studio album by Richie Sambora, the guitarist from the New Jersey band Bon Jovi. The album was released in 1991, while Bon Jovi was on a 17-month hiatus. Jon Bon Jovi also released a solo album, Blaze of Glory (1990), during this period.

== Recording and production ==
As his first solo album, Sambora experimented with a more blues-oriented sound. He sings lead vocals and plays guitar on the album, backed by his Bon Jovi bandmates Tico Torres on drums and David Bryan on keyboards, joined by Tony Levin on bass guitar. Eric Clapton makes a guest appearance playing guitar on the track "Mr. Bluesman".

"Ballad of Youth", "One Light Burning" and "The Answer" were co-written with colleagues from his former club band Shark Frenzy. "Rosie" was originally intended to be a Bon Jovi song for their fourth album New Jersey; versions of this song with the full Bon Jovi line-up have surfaced as bootlegs.

"Ballad of Youth" was released as the lead single followed by the second single "One Light Burning". The album titled track, "Stranger in This Town" was released as the third single and "Mr. Bluesman" featuring Eric Clapton was released as a promo single. The first three singles were accompanied by music videos.

The first radio promotional single was "Church of Desire" in the United Kingdom. "The Answer" and "Rosie" were also released as promo singles in Japan.

Occasionally, "Stranger in This Town" has been played by Sambora on Bon Jovi's tours, most recently on their Lost Highway Tour in 2008.

== Chart performance ==
The album charted at No. 36 on the Billboard 200 and No. 20 on the UK Albums Chart.

The lead single, "Ballad of Youth", reached a high of No. 63 on the U.S. Billboard Hot 100 and No. 59 in the UK. The album titled track, "Stranger in This Town" charted at No. 38 on the Mainstream rock charts.

== Track listing ==
| No. | Title | Writer(s) | Length |
|---|---|---|---|
| 1. | "Rest in Peace" | Richie Sambora, David Bryan | 3:47 |
| 2. | "Church of Desire" | Sambora | 6:07 |
| 3. | "Stranger in This Town" | Sambora, Bryan | 6:15 |
| 4. | "Ballad of Youth" | Sambora, Tom Marolda | 3:52 |
| 5. | "One Light Burning" | Sambora, Marolda, Bruce Foster | 5:47 |
| 6. | "Mr. Bluesman" (Solo by Eric Clapton) | Sambora | 5:14 |
| 7. | "Rosie" | Sambora, Jon Bon Jovi, Desmond Child, Diane Warren | 4:50 |
| 8. | "River of Love" | Sambora | 5:06 |
| 9. | "Father Time" | Sambora, Child | 6:06 |
| 10. | "The Answer" | Sambora, Foster | 5:07 |
| Total length: | | | 52:11 |

Japanese and Deluxe bonus track
| No. | Title | Writer(s) | Length |
|---|---|---|---|
| 11. | "The Wind Cries Mary" | Jimi Hendrix | 6:00 |
| Total length: | | | 58:11 |

== Personnel ==
- Richie Sambora – lead vocals, electric guitars, acoustic guitars, string arrangements (6, 9)
- David Bryan – keyboards, string arrangements (6, 9)
- Jeff Bova – keyboards, programming
- Jimmy Bralower – keyboards, programming
- Robbie Buchanan – keyboards, programming
- Larry Fast – keyboards, programming
- Chris Palmaro – keyboards, programming
- Eric Persing – keyboards, programming
- Eric Clapton – guitar solo (6)
- Tony Levin – bass guitar, Chapman Stick
- Randy Jackson – bass guitar (5)
- Tico Torres – drums, percussion
- Rafael Padilla – percussion
- Carol Steele – percussion
- Tawatha Agee – backing vocals
- Bekka Bramlett – backing vocals
- Dean Fasano – backing vocals
- Curtis King – backing vocals
- Franke Previte – backing vocals
- Brenda White-King – backing vocals

=== Production ===
- Richie Sambora – producer
- Neil Dorfsman – producer, recording, mixing
- John Aguto – recording assistant
- Patrick Dillett – recording assistant
- Jose Fernandez – recording assistant
- Greg Goldman – recording assistant
- Ed Goodreau – recording assistant
- Lolly Grodner – recording assistant
- John Herman – recording assistant
- Justin Luchter – recording assistant
- Bob Miller – recording assistant
- Katherine Miller – recording assistant
- David Schiffman – recording assistant
- Jeff Hendrickson – additional engineer
- Lance Phillips – additional engineer
- Frank Wolf – additional engineer
- Bob Ludwig – mastering at Masterdisk
- Jon "JD" Dworkow – production coordination
- Timothy White – cover photography
- Darryl Estrine – additional photography
- Margery Greenspan – art direction
- Umi Kenyon – design
- Bernard Maisner – logo design
- Katie Agresta – vocal coach
- Helena Occipinti – hair, make-up
- Susan Tobman – stylist

Additional technical credits

- Frank S. Levi III – electronics
- Jeff Chonis, Bobby Deluca and Christopher Hofschneider – instrument set-up and maintenance
- Stephen Barncard, Bob Borbonus, Fred Bova, Michal Jurewicz, Jonathan Little, Gary Mannon, Francis Manzella, Michael Morongell, Gary Myerberg, Mark Opie, Mark Tindle and John Williams – technical staff

== Notes ==
- Album credits on ArtistDirect
- Richie Sambora biography on RockDetector

== Charts ==
=== Album ===
| Chart (1991) | Peak position |
|---|---|
| Australian Albums (ARIA) | 44 |
| Dutch Albums (Album Top 100) | 69 |
| German Albums (Offizielle Top 100) | 72 |
| Swedish Albums (Sverigetopplistan) | 31 |
| Swiss Albums (Schweizer Hitparade) | 15 |
| UK Albums (OCC) | 20 |
| US Billboard 200 | 36 |

=== Singles ===
| Ballad of Youth (1991) | Peak position |
|---|---|
| Australia (ARIA) | 25 |
| Canada Singles | 67 |
| UK Singles (OCC) | 59 |
| US Billboard Hot 100 | 63 |
| US Mainstream Rock (Billboard) | 13 |

| Stranger in This Town (1991) | Peak position |
|---|---|
| US Mainstream Rock (Billboard) | 38 |
