= Livin' on a Prayer =

1986 single by Bon Jovi

Single by Bon Jovi

from the album Slippery When Wet
- B-side: "Wild in the Streets"
- Released: October 1986
- Recorded: 1986
- Studio: Little Mountain (Vancouver, Canada)
- Genre: Glam metal; hard rock
- Length: 4:11
- Label: Mercury
- Songwriters: Jon Bon Jovi; Richie Sambora; Desmond Child
- Producer: Bruce Fairbairn

Bon Jovi singles chronology
"You Give Love a Bad Name" (1986)	"Livin' on a Prayer" (1986)	"Wanted Dead or Alive" (1987)

Music video
- "Livin' on a Prayer" on YouTube

"Livin' on a Prayer" is a song by the American rock band Bon Jovi from their third studio album, Slippery When Wet. Written by Jon Bon Jovi, Richie Sambora and Desmond Child, the single, released in late 1986, performed strongly on both rock and pop radio and its music video was given heavy rotation at MTV, giving the band their first song to reach No. 1 on the Billboard Mainstream Rock chart and their second consecutive No. 1 Billboard Hot 100 hit.

Regarded as Bon Jovi's signature song, "Livin' on a Prayer" has topped fan-voted lists and re-charted around the world decades after its release. In 2013, the song was certified triple platinum for over 3 million digital downloads and has since sold over 13 million worldwide, making it one of the best selling singles of all time. Bon Jovi released an alternative version, "Prayer 94", on the 1994 greatest-hits album Cross Road.

== Composition ==
Sheet music for the song shows a key of E minor. The tempo is "moderate rock" at 122 beats per minute in common time. The key modulates to G minor for the final chorus. Sambora played the main guitar riff using a talk box, giving it a distinctive sound.

== Song history ==
Jon Bon Jovi did not like the original recording of this song, which is present as a hidden track on 100,000,000 Bon Jovi Fans Can't Be Wrong. Lead guitarist Richie Sambora, however, convinced him the song was good, and they reworked it with a new bassline (recorded by Hugh McDonald uncredited), different drum fills and the use of a talk box to include it on Slippery When Wet. The song spent two weeks at number one on the Mainstream Rock Tracks chart, from January 31 to February 14, 1987, and four weeks at number one on the Billboard Hot 100, from February 14 to March 14. It also hit number four on the UK Singles Chart.

The album version, timed around 4:10, fades out at the end. However, the music video game Guitar Hero World Tour features the song's original studio ending, where the band revisit the intro riff and end with a talk box solo; this version ends at 4:53. The original ending is also playable on the similar video game Rock Band 2, though edited in this case (thereby eliminating the talk box solo at the end). The version included on the 2005 DualDisc edition of Slippery When Wet has an extended version of the original ending, with a different talk box solo playing over the riff (possibly taken from an outtake of the song); this version, which fades out at the end like the standard version of the song, ends at 5:06.

Bon Jovi recorded an alternative version, "Prayer 94", for the 1994 greatest-hits album Cross Road. Rolling Stone named it one of "seven pop music remakes that never should have happened", criticizing its alteration of the song's "greatest strength", its chorus melody, and speculating that it was "a play for respectability" after the rise of grunge.

After the September 11, 2001 attacks – in which New Jersey was the second-hardest hit state after New York, suffering hundreds of casualties among both WTC workers and first responders – the band performed an acoustic version of this song for New York. Bon Jovi performed a similar version as part of the special America: A Tribute to Heroes.

In 2022, Mike Reno, vocalist of the band Loverboy, said he was certain the backing vocals he recorded for this song are used.

== Reception and legacy ==
Billboard said that "metal muscle meets gritty reality in a tough, clanging rocker." Cash Box said that "Solid chorus and ringing guitar highlight Jon Bon Jovi’s gutsy singing."

In 2006, online voters rated "Livin' on a Prayer" No. 1 on VH1's list of The 100 Greatest Songs of the '80s. More recently, in New Zealand, "Livin' on a Prayer" was No. 1 on the C4 music channel's show U Choose 40, on the 80's Icons list. It was also No. 1 on the "Sing-a-long Classics List". After Bon Jovi performed in New Zealand on January 28, 2008, while on their Lost Highway Tour, the song re-entered the official New Zealand RIANZ singles chart at number 24, over twenty years after the initial release.

Australian music TV channel MAX placed the song at No. 18 on their 2008 countdown "Rock Songs: Top 100". In 2009, the song returned to the charts in the UK, notably hitting the number-one spot on the UK Rock Chart.

In 2010, it was chosen in an online vote on the Grammy.com website over the group's more recent hits "Always" and "It's My Life" to be played live by the band on the 52nd Grammy Awards telecast.

In the Billboard Hot 100 50th Anniversary list, "Livin' on a Prayer" was named the 46th greatest rock song of all time. After the song was released for download, the song has sold 3.4 million digital copies in the US as of November 2014. Louder Sound and Billboard ranked the song number four and number two, respectively, on their lists of the 10 greatest Bon Jovi songs.

The song, including its original ending, is also playable on the music video games Guitar Hero World Tour and Rock Band 2. The song was re-worked and made available to download on November 9, 2010, for use in the Rock Band 3 music gaming platform to take advantage of PRO mode which allows use of a real guitar / bass guitar, and standard MIDI-compatible electronic drum kits / keyboards in addition to up to three-part harmony or backup vocals.

In November 2013, the song made its return to the Billboard Hot 100 at number 25, due to a viral video.

In 2017, ShortList's Dave Fawbert listed the song as containing "one of the greatest key changes in music history". In 2015, "Sleazegrinder" of Louder included the song in his list of "The 20 Greatest Hair Metal Anthems Of All Time", placing it at number 12.

In 2021, Rolling Stone ranked the song at number 457 in their updated list of the 500 Greatest Songs of All Time.

== Lyrics ==
The song describes two characters, Tommy and Gina, a working-class couple who struggle to make ends meet. Tommy loses his job as a dockworker due to a strike while Gina works as a diner waitress. Its storyline was loosely based on real-life events that Richie Sambora, Jon Bon Jovi and songwriter Desmond Child witnessed and experienced in the 1970s. The 1977 Dockworkers' Strike was the inspiration for Tommy's plight, in which the International Longshoremen's Association (ILA) engaged in a seven-week work stoppage. In another case, before becoming successful artists and songwriters, Desmond Child and his then-girlfriend, singer-songwriter Maria Vidal, lived together and had already begun their music careers, while still working day jobs; Child was a taxi driver in New York while Vidal was employed as a waitress in a diner named "Once Upon A Stove", similar to Gina in the song. The owner, manager, and other employees of the diner nicknamed Vidal "Gina" due to her slight physical resemblance to Italian actress and photographer Gina Lollobrigida.

"It deals with the way that two kids – Tommy and Gina – face life's struggles," noted Bon Jovi, "and how their love and ambitions get them through the hard times. It's working class and it's real… I wanted to incorporate the movie element, and tell a story about people I knew. So instead of doing what I did on 'Runaway', where the girl didn't have a name, I gave them names, which gave them an identity... Tommy and Gina aren't two specific people; they represent a lifestyle." Tommy and Gina are also referred to in Bon Jovi's 1988 song "99 in the Shade" and their 2000 single "It's My Life".

In a 2002 interview, Bon Jovi said that he wrote the song as a response to the Reagan Era, adding, "trickle-down economics are really inspirational to writing songs".

== Music video ==
The music video was filmed on September 17, 1986, at the Grand Olympic Auditorium in Los Angeles, California and was directed by Wayne Isham. It starts with a silhouette of the band walking down a hall, followed by shots of the band rehearsing, filmed in black and white, then playing in front of a crowd, in color. Near the beginning of the song, Jon puts on a harness that is being attached to wires by professional stunt coordinators and stunt spotters, and during the final chorus, he soars over the crowd.

The video reached 1 billion views on YouTube (the band's second song to do so) on February 1, 2023.

== Alternative versions ==
In the 1989 MTV Video Music Awards, Jon Bon Jovi and Richie Sambora performed acoustic versions of this song and "Wanted Dead or Alive". While MTV Unplugged was already in development by the time of this event, its showrunners have credited the pair's performance with influencing the show to go from initially being meant only for "young, up-and-coming artists" into being a simplified showcase for the "big, stadium, electric-arena-type acts".

A re-recorded and slower version of the song, "Prayer '94," also appeared on U.S. versions of the band's Cross Road hits collection.

A parody of the song was used in a 2026 Super Bowl commercial for State Farm Insurance. Jon Bon Jovi appears in the commercial called "Stop Livin' on a Prayer".

== Personnel ==
Bon Jovi

- Jon Bon Jovi – lead vocals
- Richie Sambora – guitar, talk box, backing vocals
- David Bryan – keyboards, backing vocals
- Alec John Such – bass (credited, but did not record), backing vocals
- Tico Torres – drums, finger cymbals

Additional musicians

- Hugh McDonald – bass (wrote and recorded the bass parts, uncredited)
- Joani Bye – backing vocals
- Nancy Nash – backing vocals
- Mike Reno – backing vocals (claimed, uncredited)

== Charts ==
=== Weekly charts ===
Weekly chart performance for "Livin' on a Prayer"
Chart (1986–1987)	Peak position
Australia (Kent Music Report)	3
Belgium (Ultratop 50 Flanders)	3
Belgium (VRT Top 30 Flanders)	4
Canada Top Singles (RPM)	1
Finland (Suomen virallinen lista)	10
Ireland (IRMA)	4
Netherlands (Dutch Top 40)	2
Netherlands (Single Top 100)	4
New Zealand (Recorded Music NZ)	1
Norway (VG-lista)	1
Scottish Singles Sales (Official Charts)	4
South Africa (Springbok Radio)	5
Spain (AFYVE)	6
Sweden (Sverigetopplistan)	2
Switzerland (Schweizer Hitparade)	12
UK Singles (Official Charts)	4
UK Rock & Metal (Official Charts)	1
US Billboard Hot 100	1
US Mainstream Rock Airplay (Billboard)	1
US Cash Box Top 100	1
West Germany (GfK)	20

Chart (2008)	Peak position
Finland Download (Latauslista)	22

Chart (2013)	Peak position
US Hot Rock & Alternative Songs (Billboard)	8

Chart (2017)	Peak position
Poland Airplay (ZPAV)	56

Chart (2021–2026)	Peak position
Finland Airplay (Radiosoittolista)	48
Global 200 (Billboard)	145
Hungary (Single Top 40)	37
Norway Airplay (IFPI Norge)	76

=== Year-end charts ===
1986 year-end chart performance for "Livin' on a Prayer"
Chart (1986)	Position
UK Singles (Gallup)	36

1987 year-end chart performance for "Livin' on a Prayer"
Chart (1987)	Position
Australia (Australian Music Report)	17
Belgium (Ultratop 50 Flanders)	29
Canada Top Singles (RPM)	28
European Hot 100 Singles (Music & Media)	70
Netherlands (Dutch Top 40)	32
Netherlands (Single Top 100)	40
New Zealand (Recorded Music NZ)	17
US Billboard Hot 100	10
US Album Rock Tracks (Billboard)	15
US Cash Box Top 100	5

2008 year-end chart performance for "Livin' on a Prayer"
Chart (2008)	Position
UK Singles (OCC)	190

2013 year-end chart performance for "Livin' on a Prayer"
Chart (2013)	Position
US Hot Rock Songs (Billboard)	95

== Certifications and sales ==
Certifications and sales for "Livin' on a Prayer"
Region	Certification	Certified units/sales
Australia (ARIA)	11× Platinum	770,000^{‡}
Brazil (Pro-Música Brasil)	Platinum	60,000^{‡}
Canada (Music Canada)	Gold	50,000^{^}
Germany (BVMI)	Platinum	600,000^{‡}
Italy (FIMI)	2× Platinum	200,000^{‡}
Japan (RIAJ) Digital single	Platinum	250,000^{*}
New Zealand (RMNZ)	7× Platinum	210,000^{‡}
Spain (Promusicae)	3× Platinum	180,000^{‡}
United Kingdom (BPI)	5× Platinum	3,000,000^{‡}
United States (RIAA)	Diamond	10,000,000^{‡}
^{*} Sales figures based on certification alone.^{^} Shipments figures based on certification alone.^{‡} Sales+streaming figures based on certification alone.

== In popular culture ==
In 2019, Grammy Award-winning singer Michelle Williams performed the song on the second US series of The Masked Singer.

== See also ==
- List of best-selling singles
- List of glam metal albums and songs
- List of highest-certified singles in Australia
- List of highest-certified digital singles in the United States
