= Richie Sambora =

American musician and songwriter (born 1959)

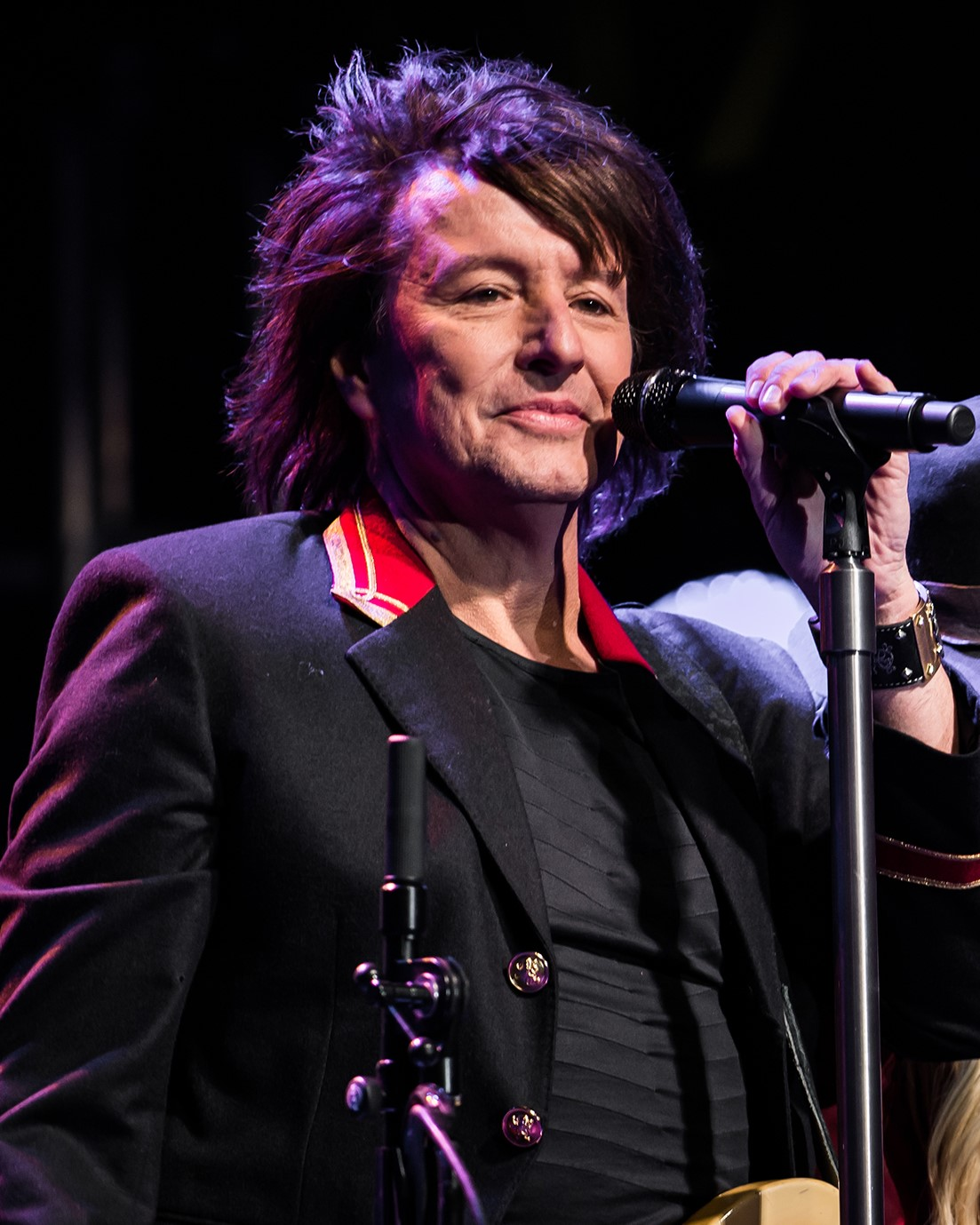
- Richie Sambora at the Winter NAMM Show 2017
- Born: Richard Stephen Sambora; July 11, 1959 (age 67); Perth Amboy, New Jersey, U.S.
- Occupations: Musician; songwriter; singer
- Years active: 1977–present
- Spouse: Heather Locklear (m. 1994; div. 2007)
- Partner: Orianthi (2014–2018)
- Children: 1
- Musical career
- Genres: Rock; hard rock; blues rock; glam metal; country rock
- Instruments: Guitar; vocals
- Labels: Mercury; Island; Mercury Nashville; Dangerbird
- Formerly of: Duke Williams and The Extremes; Bon Jovi; Message
- Website: richiesambora.com

Richard Stephen Sambora (/sæm.bʊərə/ sam-BORE-a; born July 11, 1959) is an American musician, songwriter and singer. He was the lead guitarist, backing vocalist, and co-principal songwriter for the rock band Bon Jovi from 1983 to 2013. In 2018, Sambora was inducted into the Rock and Roll Hall of Fame as a member of Bon Jovi. He reunited with his former bandmates for a performance at the induction ceremony.

As a solo artist, Sambora has released three albums: Stranger in This Town (1991), Undiscovered Soul (1998), and Aftermath of the Lowdown (2012). In 2018, Sambora and Orianthi formed the duo RSO. After releasing two EPs, RSO released their debut album, Radio Free America, in May 2018.

== Early life ==
Richard Stephen Sambora was born on July 11, 1959, in Perth Amboy, New Jersey, the son of Joan (née Sienila), a secretary, and Adam C. Sambora, a factory foreman. Sambora is of Polish descent and was raised Catholic. He grew up in Woodbridge Township, New Jersey, and graduated from Woodbridge High School in 1977. He played basketball in high school; his sophomore team won the 1975 Group 4 State title.

Sambora's first instrument was the accordion, which he began to play at the age of 6. He began playing the guitar at the age of 12 following the death of Jimi Hendrix in 1970. From his early days, Sambora was strongly influenced by blues and 1960s rock and roll.

== Career ==
=== Early career ===
Sambora was a guitarist for the band Message, and with that band put out a 1982 independent record titled Lessons. It was re-released in 1995 under the name Message, and in 2000 as Lessons. He was later in a band, Mercy, which was signed to Led Zeppelin-owned record label Swan Song Records, and then Duke Williams & the Extremes, who were signed to Capricorn Records. Sambora was also in an improvisational club band called Richie Sambora & Friends. He was part-owner of a club in New Jersey, and at age 19 owned his own independent label Dream Disc Records. Sambora's first professional tour was as an opening act for Joe Cocker in the early 1980s. Shortly before joining Bon Jovi in 1983, Sambora unsuccessfully auditioned for Kiss, to be Ace Frehley's replacement.

=== Bon Jovi ===
Sambora joined Bon Jovi in 1983, replacing the band's original lead guitarist Dave Sabo, who went on to form Skid Row. Alec John Such had been playing in a band with Sambora and joined Bon Jovi while Sambora was away in Los Angeles auditioning for Kiss. When Sambora returned home, Such promptly invited him to see the band play. Sambora was impressed with Bon Jovi after seeing the band perform live, describing the band as "magic", and he subsequently approached Jon Bon Jovi backstage and "gave him a verbal résumé". Though Sambora initially believed Bon Jovi was not interested in him, he received a phone call several days later inviting him to rehearse with the band. When Jon arrived and heard the band with Sambora, he hired him on the spot. That night, the pair returned to Bon Jovi's mother's house and wrote the songs "Come Back" and "Burning for Love", both of which would appear on the band's 1983 debut album. Sambora was the band's lead guitarist, and he also provided backing vocals. He played a major role in the band's songwriting during the early years of Bon Jovi's existence.

Bon Jovi's 1986 album, Slippery When Wet, spent eight weeks atop the Billboard 200. The first two singles from the album, "You Give Love a Bad Name" and "Livin' on a Prayer", both hit number one on the Billboard Hot 100. Slippery When Wet was named 1987's top-selling album by Billboard, and "Livin' On A Prayer" won an MTV Video Music Award for Best Stage Performance. The band won an award for Favorite Pop/Rock Band at the American Music Awards and an award for Favorite Rock Group at the People's Choice Awards.

Bon Jovi's 1988 album, New Jersey, peaked at number one in the U.S., Canada, UK, Ireland, New Zealand and Australia. The album produced five Top 10 hits on the Billboard Hot 100, giving Bon Jovi the record for the most Top 10 singles spawned by a hard rock album. Two of the hits, "Bad Medicine" and "I'll Be There for You", reached number one.

In the 1989 MTV Video Music Awards, Richie Sambora and Jon Bon Jovi performed acoustic versions of "Livin' on a Prayer" and "Wanted Dead or Alive". While MTV Unplugged was already in development by the time of this event, its showrunners have credited the pair's performance with influencing the show to go from initially being meant only for "young, up-and-coming artists" into being a simplified showcase for the "big, stadium, electric-arena-type acts".

Bon Jovi mounted a worldwide tour that continued throughout 1989 and 1990. They visited more than 22 countries and performed more than 232 shows. On June 11, 1989, the band performed a homecoming concert at Giants Stadium in New Jersey.

Sambora left the band in 2013 prior to a concert in Calgary during the band's Because We Can tour. In 2016, Sambora stated that his reason for leaving the band was in order to give his family more of his attention. "I really needed to take some time to be with my daughter," he stated "She needed me and I needed her, actually." During an appearance on the Magnificent Others podcast in early 2025, Sambora recounted his final days in the band to host Billy Corgan, noting how he and frontman Jon Bon Jovi seemed to have drifted apart in the early 2010s.

In 2018, Sambora was inducted into the Rock and Roll Hall of Fame as a member of Bon Jovi; he reunited with his former bandmates for a performance at the induction ceremony.

=== Solo albums ===
Sambora's first solo album was 1991's Stranger in This Town, a blues-influenced album that charted at No. 36 on the Billboard 200 and No. 20 on the UK Albums Chart. The lead single, "Ballad of Youth", reached a high of No. 63 on the U.S. Billboard Hot 100 and No. 59 in the UK. "One Light Burning" was released as the second single and the album titled track, "Stranger In This Town" as the third which charted at No. 38 on the Mainstream rock charts. Eric Clapton played the lead guitar on the promo single Mr Bluesman, backed by Sambora on acoustic guitars. Sambora did a short US tour in support of the album, featuring Tony Levin (bass), Dave Amato (guitar), Crystal Taliefero (percussion) and Bon Jovi bandmates Tico Torres (drums) and David Bryan (keyboards). The track "Rosie" was co-written by Jon Bon Jovi and was initially intended for the fourth Bon Jovi album New Jersey. It was also released as a promo single in Japan. "Ballad of Youth" was released in the UK in summer 1991 and despite plugs from The Friday Rock Show on BBC Radio 1 the song barely skimmed the top 75.

Undiscovered Soul was Sambora's second solo album, released in 1998. The album was produced by Don Was. The album charted at No. 174 on The Billboard 200 and No. 24 on the UK Albums Chart. The lead single "Hard Times Come Easy" charted at No. 39 on the Mainstream rock chart and No. 37 in the UK, the second single "In It For Love" charted at No. 58 on the UK Singles Chart. The title track "Undiscovered Soul" and "Made in America" were also released as singles. In support of Undiscovered Soul, Sambora toured Japan, Australia and Europe in the summer of 1998. The band featured Richie Supa (guitar), Ron Wikso (drums), Kasim Sulton (bass), Tommy Mandel (keyboards), Everett Bradley (percussion; Japan only), Gioia Bruno (percussion; Australia only) and Crystal Taliefero (percussion; Europe only).

In 2001, Sambora had a single for a movie soundtrack On The Line which was titled "Take Me On".

Fourteen years after his previous solo album, Sambora announced via his Twitter page that recording of Aftermath of the Lowdown had been completed with hopes that the album would be released in July 2012. Photographs were published of Sambora working in a recording studio. The new album was produced by Luke Ebbin, who produced Bon Jovi's Crush and Bounce albums. Aftermath of the Lowdown was released in September 2012. The album charted at No. 10 on the "Top Hard Rock Albums", No. 34 on the Top Independent Albums, No. 149 on The Billboard 200 and No. 35 on the UK Albums Chart.

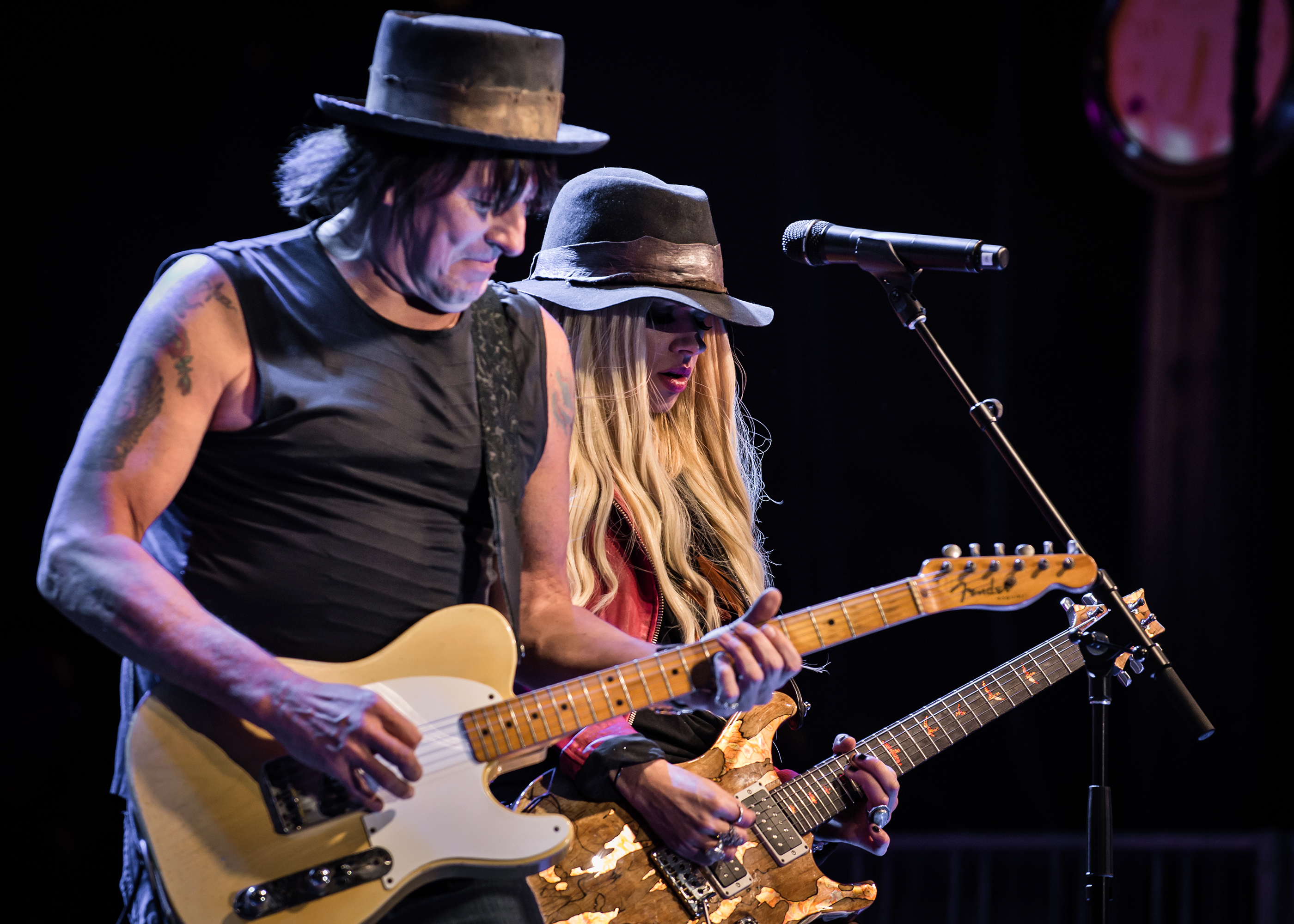
Sambora and Orianthi at the NAMM Show, January 2017

The track "Every Road Leads Home to You" was released as a single for the album and features a music video. The song is also featured as one of the bonus tracks on Bon Jovi's 2013 album What About Now. A special edition single, "I'll Always Walk Beside You'" featuring Alicia Keys was released as the second single of the album. All the profits from the sale of the special edition single goes to the ongoing recovery efforts of the Red Cross for the devastation from Hurricane Sandy. The track "Sugar Daddy" was released as a promo single and a music video was made for the song "Taking a Chance on the Wind".

In 2013, following his departure from Bon Jovi, Sambora released the solo single "Come Back as Me".

=== Other work ===
Sambora composed television theme songs for Entertainment Tonight and The Insider. Sambora (along with Jon Bon Jovi) was part of the ownership group of the Philadelphia Soul, an Arena Football League football team, until the league suspended operations in 2009.

In 1992, Sambora was on the soundtrack for Red Shoe Diaries with the feverish song "You Never Really Know". Sambora sang "Long Way Around" for the 1997 Steven Seagal action film Fire Down Below. The song, written by Seagal and David Pomeranz, appears in the final scene. In a 1998 interview Sambora said his version is in the film itself but a different person's performance of the song is included on the film's soundtrack album, despite Sambora's name appearing on the album credits. Sambora also recorded the song "One Last Goodbye" for movie The Banger Sisters, and covered Jimi Hendrix's "The Wind Cries Mary" for the soundtrack of 1990 comedy The Adventures of Ford Fairlane.

Sambora is featured on the track "Baby Rock Remix" from LL Cool J's 2008 album Exit 13.

Sambora made a guest appearance on Bo Diddley's 1996 album A Man Amongst Men, playing guitar on tracks "Can I Walk You Home" and "Oops! Bo Diddley".

In 1999, Sambora was a guest vocalist on the Stuart Smith album Stuart Smith's Heaven & Earth, performing a cover of the Deep Purple song "When a Blind Man Cries". Also in 1999, Sambora played the guitar solo on the track "Why Don't You Love Me" on the album Tuesday's Child, by Canadian singer Amanda Marshall.

In 2004, Sanctuary Records released a self-titled album which had been recorded in 1978 by Shark Frenzy, documenting Sambora's first recorded material. The mix tapes had been damaged in a flood and band member Bruce Foster had remastered them for release many years later.

Sambora co-wrote several tracks and played guitar on Australian rock/pop artist Shannon Noll's third album Turn It Up. It was released in Australia in September 2007.

To coincide with his solo album Aftermath of the Lowdown, Sambora and friends performed as the house band on The Late Late Show with Craig Ferguson on CBS for one week (December 3–7, 2012). Several guests sang along with the band over the week, including Ferguson (singing Sugar Daddy), Denis Leary, Eddie Izzard and even Larry King, who sang the Late Late Show theme song.

Sambora announced in early 2015 that he was working on a new album in collaboration with fellow musician and girlfriend Orianthi. In 2016, they performed as RSO together in Australia, South America, and England, where they opened for Bad Company. In September 2017, RSO released a five-song EP called Rise followed by another EP Making History which was also released in 2017. The duo released their debut album Radio Free America in May 2018.

Sambora competed on the fourth season of the British version of The Masked Singer as the Jacket Potato.

Sambora has been playing shows with Kings of Chaos (band) in 2026.

== Personal life ==
Sambora married actress Heather Locklear in Paris on December 17, 1994. Their daughter Ava Elizabeth Sambora, was born on October 4, 1997. Locklear filed for divorce in February 2006 citing irreconcilable differences. The divorce was finalized on April 11, 2007.

On April 20, 2007, Sambora's father, Adam, died of lung cancer.

Sambora has dated the guitarist/singer Orianthi.

=== Alcohol problems ===
On June 7, 2007, it was announced that Sambora was entering an undisclosed rehabilitation facility in Los Angeles for treatment related to alcoholism. Following his release, he told an interviewer, "I was just drinking too much and I needed to get my life together. I'm still in therapy and stuff like that, but it's good. I'm great. I feel fine." In the Bon Jovi documentary When We Were Beautiful, Sambora talks candidly about his addiction to painkillers following a fall in his bathroom. He credited his bandmates and mother with helping him through the difficult time.

On March 26, 2008, Sambora was arrested for drunk driving in Laguna Beach, California where he was a longtime resident. Both his ten-year-old daughter and her 18-year-old cousin were in the vehicle. At his May 2008 arraignment, he pleaded no contest "to driving with a blood alcohol level of .08 or higher", was fined $390, placed on probation for three years, and was required to attend a driver's education course.

On April 28, 2011, it was announced that Sambora had made the decision to enter rehabilitation again. He was absent from the band for thirteen shows during the Bon Jovi Live tour, and his guitar and vocal duties were handled by session musician Theofilos "Phil X" Xenidis. This was Sambora's second stint in rehab and was announced just a week after he finished probation for drunk driving charges. Sambora returned to join the band in June 2011 in Zagreb, Croatia, for the start of the European leg of the tour.

== Musical style and influences ==
From his early days, Sambora was strongly influenced by blues and 1960s rock and roll. His most important influences were Eric Clapton, Jimi Hendrix, Jeff Beck, Stevie Ray Vaughan, Johnny Winter, Jimmy Page, Joe Perry, Brian May, George Harrison, Hank Marvin, Dave Davies, Pete Townshend, Ritchie Blackmore, Tony Iommi, Manny Charlton, Bernie Leadon, Don Felder, Joe Walsh, and B. B. King, and he has also cited psychedelic soul singer Janis Joplin as having a big influence on his musical style.

== Public service and recognition ==
Over the years, Sambora has raised money for many charities, such as Dream Street, the Steve Young Forever Young Foundation and Michael J. Fox's Parkinson's disease charity. He has donated money privately to various cancer charities since the death of his father, including both hospitals where his father was treated, Memorial Sloan Kettering Cancer Center and M D Anderson. Sambora's fundraising with the charity Stand Up For a Cure allowed for three mobile full service hospital units to be brought to the streets of New York, two of which were named after his parents, respectively.

In May 2004, Sambora was bestowed with an Honorary Doctorate of Letters by Kean University where he attended the awards ceremony and gave a speech of acceptance. He attended Kean University as a freshman, but dropped out to pursue a career as a professional guitarist and session musician.

Sambora and his songwriting partner Jon Bon Jovi were inducted into the Songwriters Hall of Fame on June 18, 2009.

On November 24, 2009, Sambora launched charitable effort You Can Go Home in his home town of Woodbridge Township, New Jersey, which unveiled a street renamed Richie Sambora Way. He also donated funds to renovate part of his alma mater Woodbridge High School, which opened a new weight room, the Adam Sambora Fitness Center, dedicated to Sambora's father.

== Instruments and equipment ==
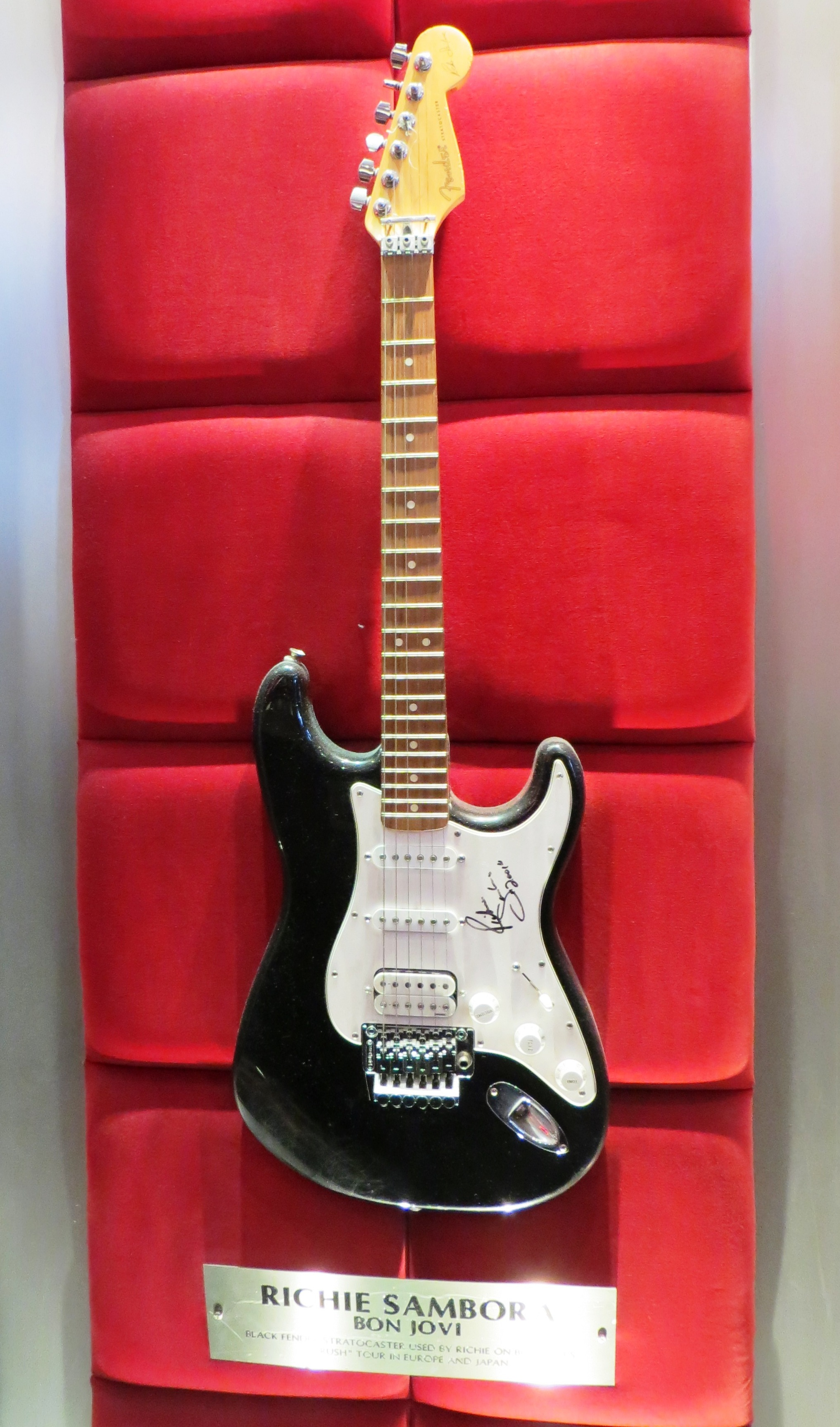
Sambora's Fender Stratocaster at the Hard Rock Cafe, London

Sambora has been known to use a wide variety of equipment throughout his career. He has an extensive guitar collection, featuring more than 130 instruments, about a third of which are various Fender Stratocaster models.

In the 1980s, Sambora mostly played Kramer, Jackson, Charvel and Hamer superstrats as well as modified and custom Gibson Les Paul models, such as his Rod Schoepfer model. In early-mid 1987, Kramer put out a Richie Sambora signature model with three humbuckers, pointy headstock, gold hardware, star-shaped fingerboard inlays and a Floyd Rose Original locking tremolo. In the early 1990s, Fender put out a Richie Sambora Stratocaster signature model with Floyd Rose locking vibrato and three pickups: a DiMarzio humbucker at the bridge, and two single coil Texas Special pickups, one at the neck and one at center.

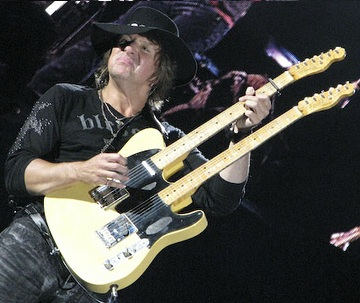
Sambora with a twin-neck Fender Telecaster, 2008

In 2000, Taylor started the production of a Richie Sambora signature model, a six-string acoustic made of koa wood, called the RSSM. Only 100 were made. All of his double-neck acoustics feature a six-string neck on top and a 12-string neck on bottom, opposite of normal. Sambora's guitar solo in the song "Bullet" from the 2009 album The Circle was played through a Dunlop Cry Baby wah pedal. In 2010 he said that he was keeping his vintage guitars at home for studio work, and bringing his less expensive guitars on the road to his concerts, including "some Strats, a few Teles, some Les Pauls and Les Paul Juniors" along with a number of Richie Sambora signature models made by ESP Guitars. Other notable guitars in Sambora's collection include the Kramer Jersey Star, Gibson SG Junior, Gibson ES-335, Gibson Firebird, Gibson Flying V, Gibson Explorer, Martin guitars, Ampeg Dan Armstrong Plexi, Ovation, Taylor and Fender Telecaster double neck guitars, and an Ovation triple neck guitar.

In early 2026, his favorite 1976 Gibson Explorer guitar was found in a vintage guitar shop in Paris "almost in perfect shape", and was returned to him 41 years after it was stolen in 1985, when Bon Jovi had traveled to Japan for a tour and Sambora had placed it in a warehouse in Perth Amboy, N.J, together with some of the band's gear.

== Discography ==
=== Studio albums ===
- Stranger in This Town (1991)
- Undiscovered Soul (1998)
- Aftermath of the Lowdown (2012)

=== with Shark Frenzy featuring Bruce Foster & Richie Sambora ===
- Shark Frenzy – 1978 (2004)
- Volume 1 (2004)
- Volume 2 – 1980–81: Confessions of a Teenage Lycanthrope (2004)

=== with Message ===
- Lessons (1982)
- Message Live (2006)

=== with Bon Jovi ===
- Bon Jovi (1984)
- 7800° Fahrenheit (1985)
- Slippery When Wet (1986)
- New Jersey (1988)
- Keep the Faith (1992)
- These Days (1995)
- Crush (2000)
- Bounce (2002)
- Have a Nice Day (2005)
- Lost Highway (2007)
- The Circle (2009)
- What About Now (2013)

=== with Cher ===
- Cher (1987)

=== with Desmond Child ===
- Discipline (1991)

=== with RSO ===
- Rise (EP, 2017)
- Making History (EP, 2017)
- Radio Free America (2018)
