= Mike Pont =

American singer

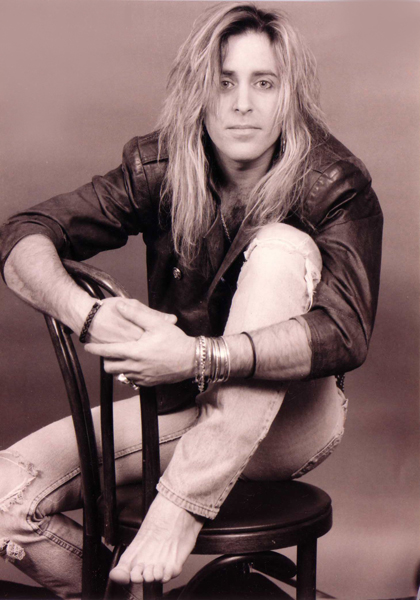

Background information
- Genres: Hard rock, glam metal
- Occupations: Singer, songwriter, photographer

Mike Pont is an American singer who has been a member of several bands, including Hotshot, Trouble, The Mike Pont Band, Danger Danger, and the Gangsters of Love.

== Career ==
=== Music ===
In 1983, Pont co-founded a new wave cover band that would perform throughout the New York Tri-state area. The pre-Danger Danger incarnation of the band Hotshot also featured then future Danger Danger members Bruno Ravel and Steve West. The post-Danger Danger incarnation of Hotshot also featured former Danger Danger guitarist Al Pitrelli.

In 1985, Pont sang backing vocals on the Jack Starr's Burning Starr album Rock the American Way.

After the first incarnation of Hotshot, he went on to form the short lived band Trouble, from which he went on to form The Mike Pont Band. The Mike Pont Band featured guitarist Tony "Bruno" Rey, drummer Chuck Bonfante, and bassist Gary Taylor, all who would go on to be members of the band Saraya.

Next, he co-founded the band Danger Danger with Bruno Ravel and Steve West. He was the original lead vocalist of Danger Danger and was replaced in Danger Danger by Ted Poley.

He left Danger Danger and moved to Los Angeles, forming the Gangsters Of Love, and performed as opening act on a few shows for LA Guns on their first tour in 1988.

After leaving Gangsters Of Love, Mike Pont moved back to NY and reformed Hotshot, this time featuring his former Danger Danger bandmate Al Pitrelli, as stated above, and bassist Teddy Cook. In 1989 Pitrelli would leave the band to join Alice Cooper for his Trashes the World tour and Cook to join Ronnie James Dio for his Lock Up the Wolves album and tour.

In 2005, he released the Hotshot CD which features Tony "Bruno" Rey, Al Pitrelli, Bruno Ravel, Steve West, Al Greenwood, Leslie West, Teddy Cook, and a 1990 phone message from Nikki Sixx showing interest in working with Hotshot.

In 2021, inspired by the COVID-19 pandemic, Pont wrote and released the single Goodbye Yesterday. Goodbye Yesterday features bassist Bruno Ravel, guitarists Joey Sykes and Rob Marcello, and original Danger Danger keyboardist Kasey Smith. A video for Goodbye Yesterday, filmed by Noam Galai and Roy Rochlin, was also released.

=== Photography ===
Pont is a celebrity photographer. In 2008, he photographed his former band Danger Danger for their 2009 album Revolve. In 2012, he began photographing celebrities, concerts, and events editorially for Getty Images. In 2016, he started photographing celebrity portraits, and still photographs, for the online entertainment show BUILD Series, AOL, Yahoo, and Verizon Media.

== Discography ==
=== With Trouble ===
- demos

=== With The Mike Pont Band ===
- demos

=== With Danger Danger ===
- demos

=== With Hotshot ===
- demos
- Hotshot (2005)

=== Mike Pont ===
- Goodbye Yesterday (2021)

Preceded by	Danger Danger lead vocalist ?	Succeeded by Ted Poley
