= Vinnie Vincent Invasion =

American glam metal band

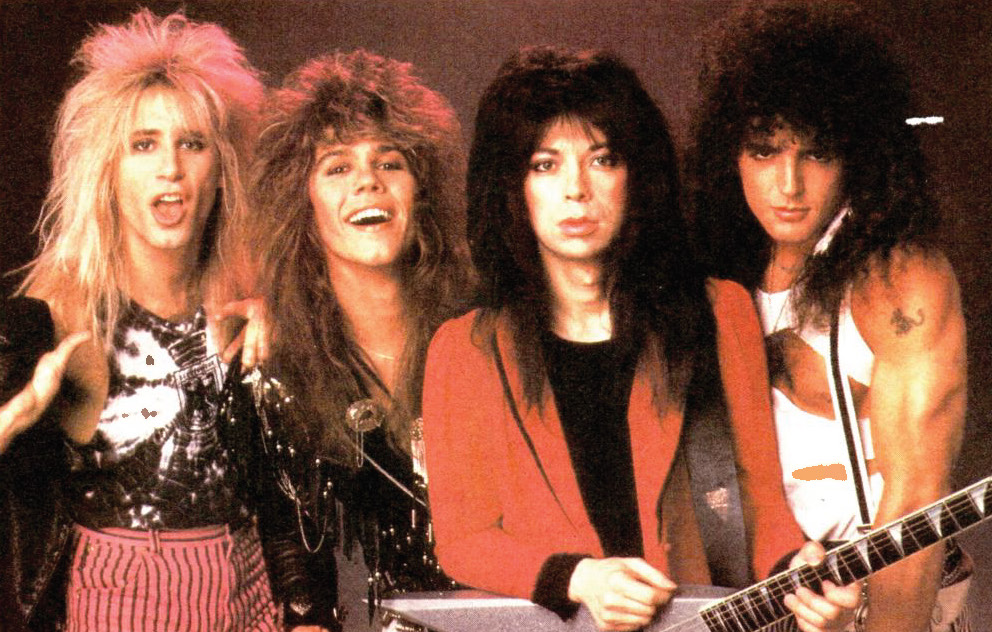
- Vinnie Vincent Invasion c. 1988 (Left to right: Dana Strum, Mark Slaughter, Vinnie Vincent and Bobby Rock)

Background information
- Origin: Los Angeles, California, U.S.
- Genre: Glam metal
- Years active: 1984–1988, 2023–present
- Label: Chrysalis
- Spinoffs: Slaughter
- Spinoff of: Kiss
- Members: Vinnie Vincent; Robert Fleischman; Keary Jordan
- Past members: Dana Strum; Bobby Rock; Mark Slaughter; Scott Board; Faysal Smile

Vinnie Vincent Invasion is an American glam metal band, formed in 1984 by former Kiss guitarist Vinnie Vincent.

In 2020, Jeff Mezydlo of Yardbarker included them in his list of "the 20 greatest hair metal bands of all time".

== History ==
Forming the band in 1984, Vinnie Vincent recruited bassist Dana Strum, who had served as a talent scout in Los Angeles, recruiting band members for the likes of Ozzy Osbourne. Strum had found both Jake E. Lee and the late Randy Rhoads for Ozzy Osbourne, so when Paul Stanley had contacted Osbourne to inquire about where he found the guitarists, he was given Strum's name. Unable to find anyone Kiss considered to be on Vincent's level, Strum decided to find Vincent himself in hopes of working together. Bobby Rock came on board as the drummer. With the nucleus of the band completed, the band searched for a lead vocalist.

Former Journey singer Robert Fleischman provided vocals on Vinnie Vincent Invasion's self-titled debut album. The record included primarily the style of glam metal, with much of it re-worked versions of demos Vincent recorded in 1982 with former New England members Hirsch Gardner, Gary Shea, and Jimmy Waldo under the band name Warrior, with Vincent essentially replacing John Fannon as guitarist and vocalist. Warrior disbanded when Vincent was selected to be a member of Kiss. Other songs were demoed in 1984 with Hirsh Gardner on drums and intended for Kiss's follow-up album, Lick It Up.

Fleischman exited the band due to a lack of interest in touring. A video was produced for the song "Boyz Are Gonna Rock" with new vocalist Mark Slaughter lipsyncing over Fleischman's vocal track. With Slaughter now on board, the band released their second album, All Systems Go in May 1988. The album featured one of the group's best-known hits, "Ashes to Ashes", and "Love Kills", which appeared on the A Nightmare on Elm Street 4: The Dream Master soundtrack.

Later in 1988, the band was released from their contract with Chrysalis Records. Having grown annoyed with what they perceived to be Vincent's domination of the project, Strum was fired and Slaughter left with him to form the band Slaughter, which would go on to have success. Bobby Rock has played as a touring drummer for Slaughter, but was not in the initial line-up. After Vinnie Vincent Invasion broke up, he briefly joined Nitro, later Nelson, and then went on to play as a session musician with Gary Hoey and other bands. Subsequent to the band's release from their Chrysalis contract and the resultant split of Slaughter and Strum to form Slaughter, Vincent reunited with original Vinnie Vincent Invasion vocalist Robert Fleischman and recorded the unreleased album Pyro Messiah (aka Guitars from Hell). Some songs from those sessions were reworked and released in 1996 as the Euphoria EP. Andre LaBelle, (drummer from 1989 to 1992), along with Fleischman, formed a new band, The Sky in 2011.

A tribute album, entitled Kiss My Ankh: A Tribute to Vinnie Vincent, was released by SplitScreen Entertainment on August 27, 2008. The album consists of new recordings of songs from Vincent's careers with Kiss and Vinnie Vincent Invasion. Featured artists include Steve Brown of Trixter, Troy Patrick Farrell of White Lion, T.J. Racer of Nitro, Sheldon Tarsha of Adler's Appetite, Chris Caffery of Savatage and Trans-Siberian Orchestra, Ryan Roxie of Alice Cooper, and rock and roll comic C.C. Banana, who performs a parody of the Kiss song "Unholy" (rewritten as a roast of Danger Danger vocalist Ted Poley).

In March 2023, Vinnie Vincent announced a listening party for a new studio album titled Judgment Day (Guitarmageddon Pt. I), the first under the Vinnie Vincent Invasion name in 35 years, at Starstruck Entertainment Studio in Nashville on May 19–20. Although Fleischman was going to be featured as the vocalist of this album, Vincent introduced Scott Board from the bands No Love Lost and Sartori as his new singer, with whom he performed at the listening party. Vincent also confirmed that Judgment Day (Guitarmageddon Pt. I) could be released towards the end of 2023. However, less than a week after Board was revealed as the band's new singer, Vincent said he was "auditioning singers for a new tour and record." Faysal Smile was later announced as the new singer on October 20, 2023. A month later, Smile posted a video teaser of what appeared to be a new Vinnie Vincent Invasion song on YouTube.

On December 21, 2025, Vincent announced that the band's new album, and first in 38 years, Judgment Day Guitarmageddon, was finished. Planned for release in 2026, the album "will be offered as 'collector singles' only, meaning one title per disc and will be released in pressings of 1000 CDs per song. 500 units US and 500 units International (per song)." Pre-orders of the CD version of the album's lead single "Ride the Serpent" were also taken. The recording features Vincent on both guitar and bass, a returning Robert Fleischman on vocals, and Keary Jordan on drums.

== Band members ==
Current

- Vinnie Vincent – guitars, backing vocals, bass (1984–1988, 2023–present)
- Robert Fleischman – lead vocals (1984–1986, 2025–present)
- Keary Jordan – drums (2025–present)

Former

- Dana Strum – bass, backing vocals (1984–1988)
- Bobby Rock – drums (1985–1988)
- Mark Slaughter – lead vocals (1986–1988)
- Scott Board – vocals (2023)
- Faysal Smile – lead vocals (2023–2025)

== Discography ==
=== Studio albums ===
- Vinnie Vincent Invasion (1986)
- All Systems Go (1988)
- Judgment Day Guitarmageddon (2026)

== Bibliography ==
- Hale, Mark (1993). "3231 Vinnie Vincent Invasion". Headbangers (First edition, second printing ed.). Ann Arbor, Michigan: Popular Culture, Ink. p. 380. ISBN 1-56075-029-4.
