= Vinnie Vincent =

American guitarist (born 1952)

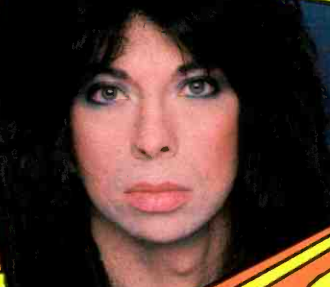
- Vincent in 1988

Background information
- Also known as: "The Wiz"
- Born: Vincent John Cusano; August 6, 1952 (age 74); Bridgeport, Connecticut, U.S.
- Genres: Hard rock; heavy metal; glam metal
- Occupations: Musician; songwriter
- Instrument: Guitar
- Years active: 1970–1998; 2018–present
- Member of: Vinnie Vincent Invasion
- Formerly of: Kiss; Dan Hartman; Treasure; Laura Nyro; Warrior; Heat

Vincent John Cusano (born August 6, 1952), better known by his stage name Vinnie Vincent, is an American guitarist. He is a former member of the rock band Kiss from 1982 until mid-1984 during the band's transition out of their 1973–1983 makeup period. Vincent was the last member to wear a unique makeup/costume configuration, as the character of the Wizard (a design created by Paul Stanley), until he and the band were first shown without the makeup during an interview on MTV in September 1983. He founded his own band, Vinnie Vincent Invasion, which had minor hits in the hair metal genre.

== Early life ==
Vincent John Cusano was born on August 6, 1952 in Bridgeport, Connecticut, the son of Theresa "Terri" (Ferraro) (1930–2021) and Alfonso Cusano, musicians. Both of his parents were of Italian descent. He picked up the guitar at an early age and was inspired by bluegrass and rock and roll. Cusano's first introduction to working with internationally renowned artists was working with Felix Cavaliere (most widely known from The Rascals and their hit "Good Lovin' ") as part of the band "Treasure". This resulted in an album of the same name being released on Epic Records in 1977. It was recorded in New York City at Sound Ideas recording studios In 1980, Vincent moved to Los Angeles, California where he became a staff songwriter for the television series Happy Days and Joanie Loves Chachi. Many of the series songs were written on Vincent's acoustic guitar while sitting at the Cunninghams' kitchen table on the Happy Days set, during off-time from the show's rehearsal schedule. Vincent has said the times of working at the Paramount lot were genuinely "happy days". According to the site "Kiss Related Recordings", Vincent has played with Dan Hartman as well as the bands Hunter, Warrior, Hitchhikers and Heat going as far back as 1970.

== Career ==
=== Kiss ===
The Wizard

After being introduced to the band by songwriter Adam Mitchell, Vincent was brought in as the replacement for guitarist Ace Frehley. Vincent's personality meshed well with Gene Simmons and Paul Stanley, thus enabling him to play lead guitar on six of the nine tracks on the Creatures of the Night album as well as co-writing three. After a commercially disappointing Creatures of the Night/Tenth Anniversary tour, that finished on a high at what ended up being the "last" makeup show (and Kiss's largest crowd attendance) at Maracanã Stadium, Rio de Janeiro, Brazil, Vincent returned to the studio with Kiss to record the Lick It Up album. His work was productive, yielding eight co-writes out of the ten songs on the album (a record for any member until Bruce Kulick's nine out of 12 on Carnival of Souls and Stanley's 10 out of 13 on Monster).

Though contributing to Creatures of the Night as a session player before being named as Frehley's replacement in December 1982, Vincent, for all the public knew, was the official guitarist in Kiss and played all the lead guitar tracks on Lick it Up. In what was a frequent occurrence for former guitarist Frehley, a "ghost player" was asked to play on the album, with Rick Derringer recording the solo on the opening track.

"Exciter" by Kiss with Vincent solo

Vincent's makeup centered around an Egyptian ankh. According to the official authorized Kiss biography, written by David Leaf and Ken Sharp, "the Egyptian Ankh Warrior" refers to Vincent's makeup and persona, while the nickname "the Wiz" refers to his virtuosity as a guitar player. According to the Simmons autobiography Kiss and Make-Up, Vincent's Kiss persona was solely "the Wiz". A persona as "the Ankh Warrior" or similar is not mentioned in the book.

Though Vincent performed well live with Kiss, he refused to sign an employment contract which strained the relationship with Simmons/Stanley. This arose because of disputes over his role in the band and pay (some reports indicated that Vincent had asked for, and was denied, a percentage of the band's gross profits). Consequently, Vincent never formally became a member of the band. This ultimately led to him leaving after the North American leg of the "Lick It Up" tour. He was replaced by Mark St. John. Despite parting on bad terms, Vincent reconnected with Kiss years later as a songwriter on the 1992 album Revenge, contributing to the songs "Unholy", "Heart Of Chrome" and "I Just Wanna". Vincent again fell out of favor with Simmons and Stanley, as they claimed that Vincent again began "making all kinds of crazy demands and pulling the same kind of crazy stuff all over again".

In 2022, Kiss released a super deluxe multi disc version of the Creatures of the Night album, which featured demos and outtakes with Vincent as guitarist and songwriter, as well as two full CDs of live recordings from the Creatures of the Night/10th Anniversary Tour, the first officially released live recordings with Vinnie Vincent.

=== Vinnie Vincent Invasion ===
Following his departure from Kiss in mid-1984, Vincent used the money he made from his tenure in the band to take a long vacation, traveling the world for a full year and visiting places like Tahiti, Philippines, Mozambique, India, and Europe, including a visit to the small town of Mora in Dalarna, Sweden. That same year, Vinnie wrote songs and recorded demos of six new songs intended for Kiss with drummer Hirsh Gardner. Then he formed the band Vinnie Vincent Invasion with, among others, former Journey singer Robert Fleischman in the mid-1980s and released two studio albums: Vinnie Vincent Invasion in 1986 and All Systems Go in 1988. The band broke up in 1989. After that, the band's singer Mark Slaughter and bassist Dana Strum formed Slaughter.

=== Later career ===
In 1996, Vincent released a solo EP from the studio sessions he did in 1990 (some say 1989–91), called Euphoria, once again with Robert Fleischman on vocals. Vincent, as well as playing all the guitars, played bass and did the drum programming under the guise of "V. Meister”. Andre LaBelle provided drum tracks to the CD but they were replaced by Vincent's drum programming. LaBelle can be heard on various tracks on the bootleg Guitarmaggedon/Guitars from Hell CD that featured five more songs than the Euphoria EP.

A tribute album entitled Kiss My Ankh: A Tribute to Vinnie Vincent was released by SplitScreen Entertainment on August 27, 2008. The album consists of new recordings of songs from Vincent's careers with Kiss and the Vinnie Vincent Invasion. Featured artists include Steve Brown of Trixter, Troy Patrick Farrell of White Lion, T.J. Racer of Nitro, Mike Weeks of Robert Fleischman's band, Sheldon Tarsha of Adler's Appetite, Chris Caffery of Savatage and Trans-Siberian Orchestra, Ryan Roxie from the Alice Cooper band and rock and roll comic C.C. Banana, who performs a parody of the Kiss song "Unholy" (rewritten as a roast of Danger Danger vocalist Ted Poley).

=== Appearances in 2018–2023 ===
After 22 years of being off the radar, Vinnie Vincent agreed to appear at the 2018 Atlanta Kiss Expo in January. Vincent fulfilled his commitment and appeared at the sold-out expo, playing a four-song set including the live premiere of Kiss's "A Million to One" from Lick It Up and a VVI song "Back on the Streets" where he was joined by original VVI vocalist Robert Fleischman. He said he considers Gene Simmons and Paul Stanley family, wishing them nothing but the best. After some e-mail exchanges with Gene Simmons, Vincent agreed to appear with Simmons on stage in April 2018, which was the first time they had met in person in over two decades. He also gave an exclusive interview to Eddie Trunk for SiriusXM, which was his first in over two decades, and held multiple question-and-answer sessions with fans.

On February 16, 2018, it was announced via Facebook that Vinnie would appear at the Days of the Dead convention in Charlotte, North Carolina in May 2018.

Vinnie Vincent's first concert in 30 years was scheduled for December 7, 2018, at Graceland, in Memphis, Tennessee. However these shows were postponed until February 8–9, 2019 in Nashville, before being canceled.

Vincent then announced another show in Nashville called "Speedball Jamm", which was scheduled for June 7, 2019. This show was ultimately canceled.

Two months later, Vincent hosted Vinnie Vincent's Birthday Bash on August 10 in Nashville, TN, followed by Vinnie Vincent's Merry Metal Christmas on December 14–15, 2019.

In August 2025, Vincent shared teasers of two previously unreleased songs, featuring Robert Fleischman on vocals: "Heavy Metal Poontang" and "Cockteazer". The songs were presented as an upcoming "Double A side single" from his new album. He also shared the cover to the upcoming album showing the title "Judgement Day: Guitarmageddon Part 1".

== Personal life ==
Vincent was married to AnnMarie Peters and they had twin daughters born in 1982. Peters was reported missing at age 43 on January 2, 1998, after failing to pick up her daughters from a sleepover with friends. Her remains were found two years later, after Gregory McArthur pled guilty to the crime. Peters had been working part-time as an escort, and McArthur had a history of crimes related to prostitution.

In 1996, Vincent married his second wife, Diane Kero, a former girlfriend of Ace Frehley; Vincent and Kero had first met at a Kiss convention in Chicago the previous year. The two resided in Smyrna, Tennessee, until her death from alcohol-related complications on January 13, 2014. She was 47 years old.

=== 2011 assault ===
In 2011, Vincent was arrested for assaulting his wife, Diane Kero, at their Tennessee home. Kero claimed that Vincent had struck her, thrown her down repeatedly, and dragged her across shards of glass. The investigation revealed the corpses of several dead dogs in the house which had been killed by one of Vincent's other dogs. The judge set bail at $10,000, and charged Vincent with aggravated assault.

== Discography ==
=== With Kiss ===
- Creatures of the Night (1982)
- Lick It Up (1983)
- Revenge (1992) songwriting credits only
- Creatures of the Night - 40th Anniversary (2022) box set with 1982-83 live gigs

=== Compilation ===
- Smashes, Thrashes & Hits (1988)
- Alive III (1993) songwriting credits only
- Kiss Unplugged (1995) songwriting credits only
- The Box Set (2001)
- The Very Best of Kiss (2002)
- Kiss Symphony: Alive IV (2003) songwriting credits only
- The Best of Kiss, Volume 2: The Millennium Collection (2004)
- The Best of Kiss, Volume 3: The Millennium Collection (2006) songwriting credits only
- Kiss Alive! 1975–2000 (2006) songwriting credits only
- The Best of KISS: Green Series (2008)
- Playlist Plus (2008)
- Playlist Your Way (2008)
- Jigoku-Retsuden (2008) songwriting credits only
- 15 Classics (2008) digital download only
- 15 Discoveries (2008) digital download only
- 45 The Complete Collection (2008) digital download only
- Alive! The Millennium Concert (2008) songwriting credits & digital download only

=== With Vinnie Vincent Invasion ===
- Vinnie Vincent Invasion (1986)
- All Systems Go (1988)
- Euphoria (EP) (1996)

=== With Black Satin ===
- Black Satin featuring Fred Parris (1976)

=== With The Hitchhikers ===
- The Hitchhikers (1976)

=== With Wendy O. Williams ===
- WOW (1984)

=== With Peter Criss ===
- Let Me Rock You (1982)

=== With John Waite ===
- No Brakes (1984 EMI)

=== With Dan Hartman ===
- Instant Replay (1978)

=== With Laura Nyro ===
- Nested (1978)

=== With Treasure ===
- Treasure (1977)

=== With Felix Cavaliere ===
- Castles in the Air (1979)

=== With HEAT ===
- Still Waiting (1981)

=== Tribute albums and singles ===
- Kiss My Ankh: A Tribute to Vinnie Vincent (2008)
- Virtual Invasion – Gypsy in Her Eyes (2017)
- Virtual Invasion – Young Blood, Young Fire (2018)
- Virtual Invasion – Forbidden (2018)
- Virtual Invasion – Tears (2020)

=== With the Bangles ===
- Everything (1988)

=== With Was (Not Was) ===
- Born to Laugh at Tornadoes (1983)

=== With Warrior ===
- Warrior (2017 HNE Recordings)
- Warrior II (2019 HNE Recordings)
- The Complete Sessions (2024 HNE Recordings)

Preceded by Ace Frehley	Lead guitarist of Kiss; 1982–1984	Succeeded by Mark St. John
