= All Systems Go (Vinnie Vincent Invasion album) =

Studio album by Vinnie Vincent Invasion
- Released: May 2, 1988
- Recorded: January–March 1988
- Studio: Cherokee (Hollywood)
- Genre: Glam metal
- Length: 55:36
- Labels: Capitol; Chrysalis
- Producers: Vinnie Vincent, Dana Strum

Vinnie Vincent Invasion chronology
Vinnie Vincent Invasion (1986)	All Systems Go (1988)	Euphoria (1996)

Singles from All Systems Go
- 1. "That Time of Year" Released: 1988; 2. "Love Kills" Released: 1988

All Systems Go is the second studio album by American glam metal band Vinnie Vincent Invasion, released on May 2, 1988.

All Systems Go featured new vocalist Mark Slaughter, who replaced Robert Fleischman. The band toured in support for this album, headlining small clubs, but broke up after the completion of the tour at the end of August 1988. The album features Yngwie Malmsteen's vocalist Jeff Scott Soto on backing vocals.

This would be the last studio album from the Vinnie Vincent Invasion for more than three decades, until the release of their upcoming third album Judgment Day (Guitarmageddon Pt. I).

== Album information ==
The singles "That Time of Year" and "Love Kills" are 2 of 4 Vinnie Vincent Invasion songs featured on the 2008 tribute album Kiss My Ankh: A Tribute To Vinnie Vincent.

"That Time of Year" features Sheldon Tarsha of Adler's Appetite, Ryan Roxie from the Alice Cooper band, Marko Pukkila of Altaria and Troy Patrick Farrell of White Lion.

"Love Kills" was recorded by Vic Rivera and Kelli McCloud.

On the 2003 remastered CD-version as released by Chrysalis Records manufactured by EMI/Capitol Records, the running time for "Love Kills" is 4:36. Various parts of Vinnie's solo as well as even some verses have been shortened by either cutting out a couple bars of music or lines of lyrics.

== Reception ==
Professional ratings
Review scores
Source	Rating
Allmusic	3/5 stars
Circus	no rating

In the March 1988 issue of Circus magazine, music critic Paul Gallotta noted that while the project's 1986 debut had been built around aggressive, lightning-fast solos, extensive touring had effectively tempered the former Kiss guitarist's obsession with sheer speed. The reviewer observed that the resulting material emerged as significantly more balanced and infinitely more accessible than their previous effort. According to the publication, energetic tracks such as "Ashes to Ashes" and "I Want Dirty Rhythm" successfully surpassed the musician's prior catalog. Meanwhile, Gallotta argued that power ballads like "That Time of Year" and "Ecstasy" possessed clear potential to enter the Top 40 charts without mimicking the commercial formula of Bon Jovi. Ultimately, the review concluded that the upcoming world tour positioned the formation for major accomplishments in 1988.

All Systems Go peaked at No. 64 on the Billboard 200. Two singles from the album, "Love Kills" and "That Time of Year" were released with music videos. "Love Kills" was featured in the soundtrack for A Nightmare on Elm Street 4: The Dream Master. MTV hosted an entire hour for the film A Nightmare on Elm Street 4: The Dream Master which featured Robert Englund as Freddy Krueger and guest Vinnie Vincent promoting the music video. However, it seems that while the song is still in the film, later releases of the Dream Master on VHS and DVD have the song turned down quite a bit compared to other songs in the film and songs in other films from the Nightmare on Elm Street series. A third track from the album, "Ashes to Ashes" received some radio airplay.

== Track listing ==
All tracks are written by Vinnie Vincent.

No.	Title	Length
1.	"Ashes to Ashes"	5:05
2.	"Dirty Rhythm"	3:38
3.	"Love Kills"	5:36
4.	"Naughty Naughty"	3:30
5.	"Burn"	4:38
6.	"Let Freedom Rock"	4:44

No.	Title	Length
1.	"That Time of Year"	4:11
2.	"Heavy Pettin"	4:38
3.	"Ecstasy"	4:40
4.	"Deeper and Deeper"	3:55
5.	"Breakout"	4:01
Total length:		55:36

CD edition bonus tracks
No.	Title	Length
12.	"The Meltdown" (instrumental)	2:01
13.	"'Ya Know'—(I'm Pretty Shot)" (instrumental)	4:07
Total length:		61:44

== Personnel ==
Vinnie Vincent Invasion

- Mark Slaughter — lead vocals
- Vinnie Vincent — guitar, backing vocals
- Dana Strum — bass guitar, backing vocals
- Bobby Rock — drums

Additional personnel

- Jeff Scott Soto — backing vocals

== Charts ==
Chart (1988)	Peak position
US Billboard 200	64
