= Dean Fasano =

American singer-songwriter

- Born: Dean C. Fasano; January 16, 1955; Mountainside, New Jersey, United States
- Died: December 8, 2009 (aged 54) Perth Amboy, New Jersey, United States
- Genres: Hard rock
- Instruments: Vocals, guitar, keyboard
- Years active: 1980–2009
- Labels: Escape Music, Two Sun Songs

Dean Fasano (January 16, 1955 – December 8, 2009) was the lead singer of the bands Message and Prophet.

== Early years ==
Fasano grew up in New Jersey, United States, and in his youth he got interested in music and singing. His special and emotional voice was long known as one of the most distinctive voices on the New Jersey music scene. In 1973, Dean Fasano was a founding member and lead singer for, what became a world-renowned, progressive rock band, Mirthrandir, Throughout the late 1970s he played in various bands with future Bon Jovi guitarist, Richie Sambora. Fasano was usually the lead vocalist in these bands. He got a record deal with Led Zeppelin's Swan Song label, however, before they got to put out an album, Led Zeppelin's drummer, John Bonham died, and the label disbanded, as would the band later.

== 1980s ==
In 1980, Fasano decided to put a band together; he brought in Richie Sambora, former Phantom's Opera bassist Alec John Such, drummer Andy Rubbo of the circuit band Flossie, and Simon Gannett, keyboard player of Mirthrandir and the New Jersey club band Rivendell. Bruce Foster, who had worked a lot with Richie Sambora, and who had also appeared on the debut KISS album, also came to play keyboard on some songs. They decided to call the band Message. They had their own company, their own publishing deal. Therefore, they weren't capable of putting out many records. Their first album was self-titled, they pressed about 1800 copies and they sold it out of the trunk of their car.

In 1982, the band managed to get some concert dates as an opening act for Joe Cocker, who was doing a small scale tour. The band got a great reception; however, they had to quit touring, due to the fact that the money ran out. They went back to Sayreville, New Jersey, to continue to play in clubs and rehearse songs. In one of those clubs, the band ran into a band called "Jon Bon Jovi and the Wild Ones". Because of that meeting, Jon Bon Jovi would call upon Richie Sambora and Alec John Such, who played in Message at that time, in 1983 when he put together a band to support his single "Runaway". Message disbanded.

Since European labels had great interest in his band, an official release with Message bootlegs was put out shortly after the disbanding of the band. In the first five days, the album sold 8,600 copies, and it hit the charts in some countries.

Shortly after The Message broke up, Fasano got together with a band called "Prophet". The band featured Fasano (as a lead and backing vocalist), Ken Dubman (guitarist), Scott Metaxas (guitarist and bassist), Mike Brown (bassist) from Phantoms Opera, Joe Zujkowski (keyboard), and Ted Poley (drummer and lead vocalist). They released a self-titled album in 1985 through the label RCA Record. The album did well in Europe, and they released a single called "Everything You Are to Me" where Fasano sings the lead. They also made a music video to this song. Fasano did not sing lead on all of the songs on "Prophet". He sang lead on "Street Secrets", "Power Play", and "Everything You Are to Me", "Away From You" and "Sail Away". He was replaced by Russel Arcara.

== 1980s and 1990s ==
Throughout the 1980s and 1990s, Fasano worked with various musicians, both as a musician and as a producer. He recorded songs with bands like Phantom's Opera and Adrian Dodz. He also started a new company, and he began to work with a new Message album. In 1990, Fasano teamed up with Richie Sambora and Fasano did background vocals on Sambora's first solo album, Stranger in This Town. He also did background vocals on Jon Bon Jovi's second solo album, Destination Anywhere, which came out in 1997. Two years earlier, the first Message album was re-released throughout Long Island Records. It was released on 31 August 1995, in Germany. This album contained songs like "Any Other Girl" written by Dean Fasano, M. Marconi, M. Terpos & L. Terpos, "Is There Love" written by Richie Sambora and "It Won’t Be Long" written by Dean Fasano.

In 1998, Fasano teamed up with Mike Walsh (guitar, keyboard and bass), Tom DeRossi (guitar), Jeff Thompsen (bass), Steve D'Acurtis (guitar, bass and sitar) and other musicians to release another album with Message. The album came out in 1998 and was released through Escape Music. The album was called Fine Line (The title track (FINE LINE) was written by Mark Allen Lanoue, and was originally recorded with Dean on vocals in 1989–1990) and consisted of many hard rock ballads.

== 2000s ==
In 2000, he released two Message albums. He did another re-release on the first Message album. He called it Lessons and this release had four bonus songs. All the songs on this album were recorded around 1982–1983. As the previous Message album, this was released through Escape Music. The musicians that appear on this album is Dean Fasano (lead vocals and guitar), Richie Sambora (guitar), Alec John Such (bass), Bruce Foster (Acoustic and electric piano and prophet 5), Simon Gannet (organ) and Andy Rubbo (drums).

The other Message album that was released that year was called Outside Looking In. This time, Message consisted of Dean Fasano (lead vocals and keyboards), Tim Hewitt (bass), Aaron Anderson (drums, percussions), Steve Morris (guitar and keyboard), Chris Ousey (harmony and backing vocals) and David Chapman (keyboards). This would be the last Message studio album.

In 2006 Fasano decided to put together a live album. It was released the same year, simply called "Message Live". The musicians that played on this album were Dean Fasano (lead vocals and additional keys), Richie Sambora (guitar and lead vocals), Alec John Such (bass), Dennis Amorusso (keys and saxophone) and Vinnie Sisser (drums). The CD had two bonus studio tracks that were recorded in Elmwood Park NJ at Panetta Studios in 1989–1990 : Just One Step Away & Fine Line (later released on MESSAGE FINE LINE in 1998): Musicians – Dean Fasano – Lead Vocals, Mark Allen Lanoue (Chasing Karma/BILOXI/Persian Risk/Message)- Guitars, Chris Flowers – Drums, Mike Gear – Bass Guitar, Rob Karten – Keyboards.

In 2007, Fasano coached Mark Lanoue on vocals during the recording of BILOXI III "In the Wake of the Storm". He also sang backgrounds on the song "I Pray".

== Family ==
Dean Fasano married Geri Galamb in 1989. They had three children, Jake, Max and Chaz.

== Death ==
He died in Perth Amboy, New Jersey, of coronary artery disease on December 8, 2009, at the age of 54.

== Discography ==
=== Studio albums ===
- Message – 1982, Dream Disc
- Prophet – 1985, Total Experience Records
- Fine Line – 1998, Escape Music
- Outside Looking In – 2000, Escape Music

=== Live albums ===
- Message Live – 2006, Two Sun Songs

=== Collaborations ===
Worked with Prophet (Everything You Are"), Mirthrandir, Richie Sambora, The Vinnie Moore Group, Chuck Burgi, Brand X, Hall And Oats, Michael Bolton, Billy Joel. Phantom's Opera, Jon Bon Jovi, Adrian Dodz and Message (They did, "Any Other Girl" and "Lessons").
