= Vinnie Vincent Invasion (album) =

Studio album by Vinnie Vincent Invasion
- Released: 1986
- Recorded: Baby 'O Recorders, Hollywood, California
- Genre: Glam metal
- Length: 48:00
- Label: Chrysalis
- Producers: Vinnie Vincent; Dana Strum

Vinnie Vincent Invasion chronology
Vinnie Vincent Invasion (1986)	All Systems Go (1988)

Singles from Vinnie Vincent Invasion
- 1. "Boyz Are Gonna Rock" / "Animal" Released: 1986; 2. "No Substitute" Released: 1986

Vinnie Vincent Invasion is the first studio album by Vinnie Vincent Invasion, released in 1986 through Chrysalis Records.

== Background ==
Six of the album's songs were originally demoed by Vincent in 1984 for possible inclusion on the follow-up album to Lick It Up. Two singles were released, "Boyz Are Gonna Rock" and "Back on the Streets". A music video was only made for "Boyz Are Gonna Rock", a song based on a demo from Vincent's earlier band Warrior that was also partly reused for the Kiss song "And on the 8th Day". In the video for "Boyz Are Gonna Rock," the singer in the video is Mark Slaughter lip-syncing rather than the actual singer Robert Fleischman. Fleischman left the band prior to filming due to a lack of interest in touring.

"Back on the Streets" was originally written by Vincent with musician Richie Friedman in 1981, demoed but not used for the Creatures of the Night album and recorded by 3 Speed for the 1984 movie Voyage of the Rock Aliens. It was later covered by Europe's original guitarist John Norum for his 1987 solo album Total Control. This song was also played by Ace Frehley during his earliest shows with his post-Kiss band Frehley's Comet in 1985 and also demoed by his band as well during this time, but the song has never appeared on any of Ace Frehley's solo albums.

On the original vinyl version, the guitar feedback that concludes "Invasion" repeats indefinitely, as a result of a locked groove. For the CD and cassette versions, the feedback repeats for about two and a half minutes. The liner notes state that no pedals, outboard gear or synthesizers were used anywhere on the album.

The band opened for Alice Cooper in 1986 and Iron Maiden in 1987 to support the record. The song "Animal" appeared on the soundtrack for the 1987 movie Summer School.

The songs "Boyz Are Gonna Rock" and "Back on the Streets" are 2 of 4 Vinnie Vincent Invasion songs featured on the 2008 tribute album Kiss My Ankh: A Tribute to Vinnie Vincent. Mike Weeks played the guitar, bass and did the vocals on a very accurate version of "Boys Are Gonna Rock" which also featured drums by Andre Labelle, who had previously recorded drums on Vinnie's third (and unreleased) album Guitarmaggedon/Guitars from Hell.

== Reception ==
Professional ratings
Review scores
Source	Rating
Allmusic	3/5 stars
Crusher	(favorable)
Sleaze Roxx	(favorable)

The album was listed number 8 on Kerrang!'s list of hard rock albums in 1986. The same magazine listed the album number 100 on their list of 100 Greatest Heavy Metal Albums of All Time. In the book Fargo Rock City, journalist Chuck Klosterman names it the second greatest heavy metal album of the 1980s, behind only Appetite For Destruction by Guns N' Roses. Rolling Stone listed it 39th on their 2015 list of Greatest Hair Metal albums of all time.

== Track listing ==
All tracks are written by Vinnie Vincent, except where noted.

No.	Title	Length
1.	"Boyz Are Gonna Rock"	4:53
2.	"Shoot U Full of Love"	4:43
3.	"No Substitute"	3:51
4.	"Animal"	5:32
5.	"Twisted"	4:47
6.	"Do You Wanna Make Love" (Vincent, Robert Fleischman)	3:22
7.	"Back on the Streets" (Vincent, Richard Friedman)	4:48
8.	"I Wanna Be Your Victim"	4:35
9.	"Baby-O"	3:41
10.	"Invasion" (Vincent, Fleischman)	7:48
Total length:		48:00

== Personnel ==
- Robert Fleischman – lead vocals
- Vinnie Vincent – guitar, backing vocals
- Dana Strum – bass, backing vocals
- Bobby Rock – drums

== Charts ==
Chart (1986)	Peak position
US Billboard 200	64
