= Music of North Dakota =

The Music of North Dakota has followed general American trends over much of its history, beginning with ragtime and folk music, moving into big band and jazz. With the development of mass media, local artists in North Dakota, as in the rest of the country, saw a rapid loss of opportunity to create, perform, and sell popular music to the regional audience that had previously provided a market. Punk Music is a major genre in the modern youth scene of North Dakota.

== Ethnic music ==
One aspect of music that has been around for over a century is the "old-time" music, still played, danced to, and sung in parts of North Dakota. Such music is typified by fast waltzes, polkas, schottisches, two-steps, and the butterfly.

== Popular music ==
Presently, North Dakota has a number of active indie acts and pop music. The most active music scenes for local artists in popular styles are in Fargo, Minot, Grand Forks, Bismarck, and Williston, while Dickinson and Devils Lake are active to a lesser extent. Most shows are booked by independent promoters who find space for shows wherever available, though occasionally groups like the AMP have provided permanent venues for musical acts. A lot of bands that were popular in the 80s like playing in North Dakota to the old folk. Country music acts like to play more often in ND.

=== Touring acts ===
Smaller musical groups passing through North Dakota often play at the independently promoted shows in the state's larger cities alongside local acts.

Medium-sized groups may be headlined in events thrown by financially interested promoters, such as the Hub's Venue (formally Playmaker's Pavilion) in Fargo.

Large touring acts crossing North Dakota often use the state's larger event venues such as the Alerus Center (Grand Forks), Fargodome (Fargo), and Bismarck Civic Center (Bismarck), to draw large arena rock crowds. National acts in a variety of styles are also often booked for the North Dakota State Fair (Minot), though the fair does tend to have more country groups in keeping with the fair's rural focus.

== Classical music ==
In addition to popular music, classical music and jazz are common across the state. Independent jazz bands are rare, but there are many school programs for music. The International Music Camp is also located on the border between North Dakota and Manitoba.

Many of North Dakota's universities have great music programs; the choir program at Jamestown College and the instrumental music programs at the University of Mary and the University of North Dakota are particularly notable.

Concert orchestras operate in Bismarck, Fargo, Grand Forks, and Minot. Of these, the Fargo-Moorhead Symphony Orchestra is the largest, while the Greater Grand Forks Symphony Orchestra is the oldest.

Many opera groups exist in the state. Two of the larger ones include the Fargo-Moorhead Opera Company and The Western Plains Opera Company of Minot, each of which stage two-three performances a season.

Choral music organizations include the Grand Forks Master Chorale, the Fargo Chamber Chorale, and the Nodakords, Heritage Singers, and Voices of Note, all of Minot.

International Music Camp, a summer camp providing intensive instruction in music and fine arts, is held each summer at the International Peace Garden.

== Modern history ==
Since the late 20th century, North Dakota has seen a number of active musical scenes.

=== 1970s and 1980s ===
In the late 1970s and early 1980s, there was a small but thriving new wave/power pop scene based in Fargo. Groups like Johnny Holm, "The Unbelievable Uglies", "The Newz", "Clown", "Brittania", "Nitro Brothers", "The Phones" and "The Metro All-Stars" were the premier bands. These bands played extensively throughout the upper Midwest, benefitting from a short-lived surge in bars that booked rock and roll bands during the early 80s. For example, in Jamestown, North Dakota, there was one bar and a "teen canteen" that booked rock and roll bands in 1978, but by 1984, there were five such venues. Bismarck, also had several venues for local bands such as "The Champ Band", "Cypress" and "Nightlife" to perform in. In Fargo/Moorhead, you could hear a live band 7 nights a week with music clubs including The Lamplight, The Sunset Lanes, The Zodiac, The Gaslight, The 4-10 Lounge, Jerry's and Kirby's. These venues would draw bands from all over The Midwest where they could perform 5-6 nights a week. Some of the venues had music 7 nights a week. This pattern was briefly replicated in many similar cities in the region. This led several regional bands to write original music and even record albums, some of which sold respectably by regional standards. The scene was also lucrative enough to allow many bands from the Minneapolis-St. Paul, Minnesota area to play throughout North Dakota.

As the 1980s progressed and a farm crisis hurt the state's economy, new drinking and driving laws, plus bar insurance laws were passed, the nightclub and bar scene began to struggle. In 1980, The Good Music Agency (GMA) relocated nearly all of their Fargo/Moorhead bands to Minneapolis which had a very hot music scene at the time. Thus, the local music scene shrank and a number of bars and clubs that had booked music ceased to do so. For example, the five Jamestown bars that had booked bands back in 1984 were all closed or no longer booking in 1989. By mid-decade, most of the leading bands had disbanded. "Silver", after purchasing the rights to the "Uglies" name, had decamped to Minneapolis, Minnesota and become "The Metro Allstars" (later: "The Metros"), "Brittania" and "The Newz" performed all over the Midwest. As the thriving Twin Cities music scene of the mid-1980s dissipated so to did the Fargo music scene fade.

Many homegrown bands spawned in the wake of this brief renaissance. Some bands tried to emulate bands from bigger markets by mixing originals in among the hours of cover songs. Most earned a living playing the hits of the day instead of original music.

Heavy metal bands were also popular in the 1980s. Chuck Klosterman wrote a tongue-in-cheek book on his experiences in the rock scene in North Dakota in the book Fargo Rock City.

=== 2000s and 2010s ===
In the late 90s and early 00s, Fargo retained a small but active metal scene as well as a growing noise rock scene centered around bands like Morast, Godhead Silo, Hammerhead and Animal Lover.

In the mid to late 2010s, Fargo became recognized as a growing hub for experimental, industrial and noise music. Although noise had a smaller presence since the 90s with acts like Edwin Manchester and Unconditional Loathing, noise proliferated under the organization of musician Brandon Wald who would attend punk shows and hand out copies of zines on the history of industrial music. Throughout the decade, Wald would perform under the names of Monowolf and Support Unit while also running the Black Ring Rituals FM radio show and Black Ring Rituals Records label. In 2018, artist Trinity Hall began Doughgirl Tapes, a cassette label dedicated to pressing noise and experimental releases. The scene is noted for its heavy queer presence as well as its radical politics, with artists often covering themes related to violence against LGBT people, far-left politics, police brutality as well as local North Dakota issues related to environmental degradation and the Dakota Access Pipeline. Fargo has also hosted the biennial Fargo Noise Fest since 2016, though the event was cancelled in 2020 due to the COVID-19 pandemic.

== Notable North Dakota musicians ==
- Lynn Anderson - country/western musician, known for "Rose Garden" (1971). Born in Grand Forks .
- Shannon Curfman - blues guitarist and singer. Born in Fargo.
- Jonny Lang - blues guitarist and singer, 1990s–2020s. Born in Casselton.
- Peggy Lee - pop singer of the 1940s–50s, known for "Mañana (Is Soon Enough for Me)" (1947) and other hits. Born in Jamestown.
- Danny Mangold - guitarist
- Mitch Malloy – rock musician. Born in Dickinson.
- Mary Osborne - jazz guitarist of the 1940s–60s. Born in Minot.
- Bobby Vee - rock/pop singer; became famous in the 1960s. Born in Fargo.
- Lawrence Welk – band leader and TV host of the Lawrence Welk Show (1951–82). Born in Strasburg.
- Wiz Khalifa - rapper, known for "See You Again" (2015) and other songs. Born in Minot.
