= Danger Danger (album) =

- Cover art by Mark Ryden

Studio album by Danger Danger
- Released: June 27, 1989
- Recorded: September 1988–May 1989
- Genres: Hard rock; glam metal
- Length: 49:40
- Label: Epic
- Producer: Lance Quinn

Danger Danger chronology
Danger Danger (1989)	Screw It! (1991)

Singles from Danger Danger
- 1. "Naughty Naughty" Released: 1989; 2. "Bang Bang" Released: 1989; 3. "Don't Walk Away" Released: 1990

Professional ratings
Review scores
Source	Rating
AllMusic	3/5 stars
Rolling Stone	no rating

Danger Danger is the debut studio album by the American rock band Danger Danger, was released on June 27, 1989, through Epic.

== Track listing ==
All songs written by Steve West and Bruno Ravel.

Side 1
No.	Title	Length
1.	"Naughty Naughty"	4:50
2.	"Under the Gun"	4:39
3.	"Saturday Nite"	4:17
4.	"Don't Walk Away"	4:56
5.	"Bang Bang"	3:56

Side 2
No.	Title	Length
6.	"Rock America"	4:54
7.	"Boys Will Be Boys"	4:58
8.	"One Step from Paradise"	4:47
9.	"Feels Like Love"	4:52
10.	"Turn It On"	3:40
11.	"Live It Up"	3:54
Total length:		49:40

== Personnel ==
Danger Danger

- Ted Poley – lead and backing vocals
- Kasey Smith – keyboards
- Bruno Ravel – bass guitar, backing vocals, cello, rap (track 11)
- Steve West – drums, rap (track 1)
- Andy Timmons – guitars (tracks 3 & 7)

Additional musicians

- Tony "Bruno" Rey – guitars, backing vocals (except tracks 3 & 7)
- Rick Valente – backing vocals (except track 11), harmonica (track 11)
- Carol & Jeanie Brooks – backing vocals
- Monica – spoken word (tracks 1 & 11)
- Mark Ryden – cover art

== Charts ==
Chart (1989)	Peak position
US Billboard 200	88
