= Cockroach (album) =

Studio album by Danger Danger
- Released: 2001
- Recorded: 1993-1994 at Miami, Florida; Morin Heights, Quebec
- Genres: Hard rock, glam metal
- Length: 103:00
- Label: Epic
- Producers: Bruno Ravel; Steve West

Danger Danger chronology
The Return of the Great Gildersleeves (2000)	Cockroach (2001)	Rare Cuts (2003)

Cockroach is a Danger Danger album released in 2001 as a 2-CD set. One CD features singer Ted Poley and the other CD features singer Paul Laine.

The album was recorded in 1993 while Ted Poley was still the lead singer of the band. Shortly after finishing it, Poley was dismissed from the band and Paul Laine was hired as its new singer; he re-recorded the vocals in 1994. However, Poley sued the band and the label prohibiting its release. Epic decided to shelve it and the band went on with their career. The album was also the first to be recorded after Danger Danger parted ways with keyboardist Kasey Smith.

In 2001, Epic decided to release the album as a 2-CD set, including both versions. In 2004, Poley rejoined the band.

== Reception ==
Metal Reviews said, "This album is a must for anyone who enjoyed the band's first two albums as well as fans of Ted's new band, Melodica. Fans of 80's hard rock bands in general should jump on this release as I feel this is the quintessential Danger Danger release."

== Track listing ==
=== Disc 1 (Paul Laine on vocals) ===
1. "Still Kickin'" (Bruno Ravel, Steve West) - 4:17
2. "Sick Little Twisted Mind" (Ravel, West, Andy Timmons) - 6:08
3. "Good Time" (Ravel, West) - 3:42
4. "Don't Break My Heart Again" (Ravel, West) - 4:40
5. "Tip Of My Tongue" (Ravel, West) - 3:52
6. "Walk It Like Ya Talk It" (Ravel, West) - 4:45
7. "Goin' Goin' Gone"(Ravel, West, Timmons) - 3:49
8. "Afraid Of Love" (Ravel, West) - 5:07
9. "When She's Good She's Good (When She's Bad She's Better)" (Ravel, West) - 4:46
10. "Shot O' Love" (Ravel, West) - 4:03
11. "Don't Pull The Plug" (Ravel, West, Timmons) - 6:16
12. "Time in a Bottle" (Jim Croce) - 2:56

=== Disc 2 (Ted Poley on vocals) ===
1. "Still Kickin'" (Bruno Ravel, Steve West) - 4:17
2. "When She's Good She's Good (When She's Bad She's Better)" (Ravel, West) - 4:46
3. "Shot O' Love" (Ravel, West) - 4:03
4. "Afraid Of Love" (Ravel, West) - 5:07
5. "Tip Of My Tongue" (Ravel, West) - 3:52
6. "Walk It Like Ya Talk It" (Ravel, West) - 4:45
7. "Goin' Goin' Gone" (Ravel, West, Andy Timmons) - 3:49
8. "Good Time" (Ravel, West) - 3:42
9. "Don't Break My Heart Again" (Ravel, West) - 4:40
10. "Don't Pull The Plug" (Ravel, West, Timmons) - 6:16
11. "Sick Little Twisted Mind" (Ravel, West, Timmons) - 6:08

== Personnel ==
- Paul Laine – vocals (disc 1 only)
- Ted Poley - vocals (disc 2 only)
- Andy Timmons – guitars
- Bruno Ravel – bass
- Steve West – drums
