= Everybody Wants Some =

Everybody Wants Some may refer to:

- "Everybody Wants Some!!" (song), a 1980 song by Van Halen
- Everybody Wants Some!! (film), a 2016 American comedy
- "Everybody Wants Some", a 1991 song by Danger Danger from Screw It!
- "Everybody Wants Some" (Pts. 1, 2 & 3), 1996 songs by Galactic from Coolin' Off
