= Dawn (Danger Danger album) =

Studio album by Danger Danger
- Released: 1995
- Genre: Hard rock; grunge
- Label: Low Dice
- Producer: Paul Laine; Bruno Ravel

Danger Danger chronology
Screw It! (1991)	Dawn (1995)	Four the Hard Way (1997)

Professional ratings
Review scores
Source	Rating
Allmusic	3/5 stars

Dawn is the third Danger Danger album in order of release, though it isn't the third to be recorded. It features Bruno Ravel on guitar as well as bass.

On this album, the band went in a very different direction musically, lyrically and image-wise from its previous albums. It can loosely be compared to Warrant's Ultraphobic, which was also released in 1995.

This album was released in place of Cockroach, which was scheduled for a 1993 release. However, Ted Poley sought legal action, preventing the album's release.

Bassist Scott Brown, who had previously played with Paul Laine as a solo artist, played bass for the tour for Dawn, though he didn't play on the actual album.

== Track listing ==
All tracks by Paul Laine & Bruno Ravel

1. "Helicopter" – 4:58
2. "Crawl" – 4:53
3. "Punching Bag" – 4:58
4. "Mother Mercy" – 4:32
5. "Sorry" – 5:22
6. "Drivin' Sideways" – 3:48
7. "Goodbye" – 3:51
8. "Wide Awake and Dead" – 6:12
9. "Nobody Cares" – 4:37
10. "Heaven's Fallin'" – 5:44
11. "Hard" – 5:30

== Personnel ==
- Paul Laine – lead vocals, Hammond B-3 organ, acoustic guitar, percussion
- Bruno Ravel – lead and rhythm guitars, backing vocals, keyboards, bass
- Steve West – drums, percussion
