= Four the Hard Way =

Studio album by Danger Danger
- Released: September 21, 1997 (Japan); May 19, 1998 (US)
- Recorded: New York City and Vancouver, B.C, 1997
- Genre: Hard rock
- Length: 50:40
- Label: Low Dice
- Producer: Danger Danger

Danger Danger chronology
Dawn (1995)	Four the Hard Way (1997)	The Return of the Great Gildersleeves (2000)

Professional ratings
Review scores
Source	Rating
AllMusic	2.5/5 stars

Four the Hard Way is the fourth Danger Danger album, and the second featuring singer Paul Laine. It was also a return to their classic sound. Former members Andy Timmons and Kasey Smith contributed to the album.

== Track listing ==
1. "Still Kickin'" – 4:01
2. "Sick Little Twisted Mind" – 5:44
3. "Jaded" – 3:19
4. "Captain Bring Me Down" – 5:03
5. "Goin' All the Way" – 3:42
6. "The Girl Ain't Built to Sleep Alone" – 4:52
7. "Goin' Goin' Gone" – 4:10
8. "Afraid of Love" – 5:22
9. "Heartbreak Suicide" – 4:45
10. "I Don't Need You" – 5:23
11. "Comin' Home '98" (bonus track)

== Personnel ==
=== Band ===
- Paul Laine – lead vocals (tracks 1, 3 – 10); backing vocals; keyboards (tracks 4, 9, 10); wah-wah guitar (track 3); acoustic guitar (track 4)
- Bruno Ravel – bass; guitar (tracks 4 – 6, 9, 10); backing vocals (tracks 1, 8 – 10); keyboards (track 8); lead vocals (track 2); guitar noise
- Steve West – drums, percussion

=== Guest musicians ===
- Andy Timmons – guitar (tracks 1, 2, 7, 8); backing vocals (track 1)
- Tony Bruno – guitar (tracks 3 – 6, 9, 10)
- Kasey Smith – keyboards (tracks 5, 7)
