= Prophet (band) =

American rock band

- Origin: Trenton, New Jersey, U.S.
- Genres: Hard rock, progressive rock
- Years active: 1983–1991 (Reunions: 2012, 2015)
- Labels: Total Experience, Megaforce, Halycon, Z Records, Wounded Bird
- Past members: Ken Dubman; Scott Metaxas; Joe Zujkowski; William Runco; Bob Butterfield; Marc Hoffman; Dean Fasano; Ted Poley; Russell Arcara; Michael Sterlacci; Dave DiPietro; Jim Callahan; Bill Dellicato

Prophet was an American melodic rock band from Trenton, New Jersey, was formed in 1983. The last lineup of the group featured Russell Arcara (lead vocals), Dave DiPietro (guitar), Ken Dubman (guitar), Scott Metaxas (bass guitar), Joe Zujkowski (keyboards) and Jim Callahan (drums). However, the band had many lineups along its career.

== History ==
Prophet was founded in 1983 by two previous members of Icarian and Tom Fuller's Rock City, bassist Scott Metaxas and keyboardist Joe Zujkowski. To complete the group, they invited Ken Dubman (guitar), William Runco (guitar), Bob Butterfield (drums) and Marc Hoffman (lead vocals). The band started its career playing cover songs by bands such as Queen, Boston, Kansas and Styx. In fact, they were considered to be one of the best cover bands in New Jersey in the 80's.

In the same year, Hoffman and Butterfield left the band and were replaced by Dean Fasano (lead vocals) and Ted Poley (drums & vocals). Poley played with Dubman years before in another rock band named Lush, when they were in High School. William Runco also left the band, but was not replaced by another musician.

With this new formation, the group recorded its debut self-titled album for Total Experience/RCA. It includes the song "Slow Down", which may have influenced the hit "Wanted Dead or Alive", by Bon Jovi, years later.

After having released the first album, Fasano and Poley left the band. Poley joined the group Danger Danger as its lead vocalist and bandleader.

Prophet then invited Russell Arcara (lead vocals) and Michael Sterlacci (drums & backing vocals) to join. Arcara had previously fronted the Jack Ponti led band Surgin' whose debut album When Midnight Comes was released by EMI America in 1985 and contained Surgin's version of "Shot Through the Heart", co-written by Ponti and Jon Bon Jovi, which had appeared on Bon Jovi's eponymous debut album a year earlier.

During this period the band was managed by Noel Monk who previously managed Van Halen. This lineup recorded the band's second album, Cycle of the Moon for Megaforce/Atlantic. This album is considered the most important by the group and peaked at 137 on the Billboard 200.

In 1991, prior to Prophet releasing its third album, 'Recycled' (Halycon Records), Sterlacci left and relocated to Los Angeles, CA. With T.T. Quick's Dave DiPietro (guitar) and Jim Callahan (drums) joining the fold, the band recorded Recycled for Halycon Records. This album also had Karl Cochran (acoustic guitar & backing vocals) as a special guest.

From 1992, Prophet's members started various new projects. Arcara created two other bands after leaving Prophet, Arcara (also known as Where's Mary) and The Way. Also during this time Arcara formed a cover band called Wally and the Beaver, featuring Dubman, DiPietro, Callahan, Stephen DeAcutis (session player, "Sound Spa" studio owner and successful record producer, and bassist/vocalist Tony LeClerc (also from Where's Mary and New York City's Big Bad Wolf and currently bass guitarist for former Warner Bros. and EMI recording artist Twinkle Yochim and her band RockSoulRadio).

DiPietro would leave before their first show for personal reasons and the group continued as a five-piece. DiPietro and Scott Metaxas joined Nuclear Assault in 1992 to record and tour behind the Something Wicked album. Dubman joined the blues band Rocket 88. Callahan created a software company and started working as a graphic designer. Years prior, during Prophet's heyday, Dubman, Arcara, Metaxas and Callahan were also active with their renowned cover band, the Edgar Cayce Band, named after the American prophet, Edgar Cayce.

On April 8, 1996, Joe Zujkowski was found dead as a result of suicide. He was 39.

On April 29, 2012, the band reformed for a reunion show, with a lineup consisting of Metaxas, Dubman, Arcara, Callahan with new keyboardist Bill Dellicato replacing Joe Zujkowski (who had died in the time since the band had last been together).

In 2016, Ken Dubman released a solo album, Reckless Abandon , which he described as "earthy, organic 70's style hard driving rock".

Russell Arcara currently fronts the band Revolution Rewind.

Prophet's albums have been re-released by different companies over the years. The self-titled debut, Cycle of the Moon and Recycled have all seen multiple re-issues through UK-based label Z Records.

In addition, Z also released a "Best of Prophet" with songs from all 3 albums, titled Asylum, in 2013. In 2009, Cycle of the Moon saw a stateside re-release via Wounded Bird Records.

== Members ==
Last lineup

- Ken Dubman – guitar (1983—1991, 2012, 2015), backing vocals (2012, 2015)
- Scott Metaxas – bass guitar, backing vocals (1983—1991, 2012, 2015); acoustic guitar and lead vocals (studio only)
- Russell Arcara – lead vocals (1987—1991, 2012, 2015)
- Jim Callahan – drums (1991, 2012, 2015)
- Bill Dellicato – keyboards, piano (2012, 2015)

Past members

- Joe Zujkowski – keyboards, piano (1983—1991; died 1996)
- Marc Hoffman – lead vocals (1983)
- William Runco – guitar (1983)
- Bob Butterfield – drums (1983)
- Dean Fasano – lead vocals (1983—1987; died 2009); backing vocals (1984)
- Ted Poley – drums (1983—1987); lead vocals (1984—1987); backing vocals (1984)
- Michael Sterlacci – drums, backing vocals (1987—1991)
- Mike DiPietro – drums (1991)

== Discography ==
- Prophet (1985)
- Cycle of the Moon (1988) (#137 Billboard 200, 1988)
- Recycled (1991)
