= Message (band) =

American rock band

- Origin: New Jersey
- Years active: 1980-1982, 1995-1998, 2000, 2006
- Past members: Dean Fasano; Richie Sambora; Alec John Such; Simon Gannett; Bruce Foster; Andy Rubbo; Mike Walsh; Tom DeRossi; Jeff Thompsen; Steve D’Acurtis; Tim Hewitt; Aaron Anderson; Steve Morris; Chris Ousey; David Chapman; Mark Allen Lanoue; Chris Flowers; Mike Gear; Rob Karten; Vinnie Sisser; Dennis Amaruso

Message was a hard rock band that was formed in New Jersey around 1980. The original members of the band were Dean Fasano (lead vocals, guitar), Simon Gannett (organ), Bruce Foster (keyboard), Andy Rubbo (drums), Richie Sambora (guitar), and Alec John Such (bass). The latter two would leave Message to form the classic lineup of Bon Jovi. The band disbanded shortly after releasing one record, but the lead singer, Dean Fasano released three more records later under the band name with different many members.

== History ==
=== 1980s ===
The band was formed in 1980 by Dean Fasano. He sang lead vocals, while Richie Sambora played guitar, Alec John Such played bass, Andy Rubbo played drums, Simon Gannett played organ and Bruce Foster played both electric and acoustic piano. Shortly after the band was formed, they put out a self-titled album from their very own company. Due to the lack of money, the band did only 1800 pressings of the album, and they had to sell it from the trunk of their cars.

Two years after the forming of Message, they got the opportunity to be an opening act for Joe Cocker. Unfortunately, they did not have the money to tour over a long period of time, therefore they only played a few dates on the Joe Cocker tour. When the band returned to its roots in Sayreville in New Jersey, some of the band members met Jon Bon Jovi from "Jon Bon Jovi and the Wild Ones". This meeting would cause both Richie Sambora and Alec John Such to leave Message in favor of Jon Bon Jovi's new band, Bon Jovi. The members of Message parted ways, but they would still stay in touch with each other for some time. After the breakup, some bootlegs from the Joe Cocker tour was put out for sale in Europe, and it hit the charts in some countries.

=== 1990s and 2000s ===
The band would not release a record until 1995, when their first album was re-released in CD. A few years later, the lead singer, Dean Fasano formed a new Message. This time the line up included Mike Walsh (guitar, keyboard and bass), Tom DeRossi (guitar), Jeff Thompsen (bass), Steve D’Acurtis (guitar, bass and sitar) and various other musicians. The new Message released an album called "Fine Line" in 1998. Only two years later, in 2000, Dean Fasano would put together another lineup of Message. This time the line up was Dean Fasano (lead vocals and keyboards), Tim Hewitt (bass), Aaron Anderson (drums, percussions), Steve Morris (guitar and keyboard), Chris Ousey (harmony and backing vocals) and David Chapman (keyboards). The album was called "Outside Looking In". This was the last studio album that Message released.

Another re-release of the first Message album was done the same year as "Outside Looking In" came out. This time the album was called "Lessons" and it contained bonus songs such as "Diana", "Living In The Night" and "Dance Of The Dead".

In 2006, Dean Fasano released live songs from the Joe Cocker tour in 1982. The album was called "Message Live" and it contains songs from the original Message line up. This album contained a bonus studio tracks from Mark Allen Lanoue and Dean Fasano, called "Just One Step Away and another called FINE LINE (released earlier on MESSAGE FINE LINE) with musicians Chris Flowers - Drums, Mike Gear - Bass, and Rob Karten - Keys"

In 2009, the leader of Message, Dean Fasano died from Coronary artery disease, only 54 years old.

== Discography ==
=== Studio albums ===
- Lessons (1981)
- Message (1995)
- Fine Line (1998)
- Lessons (2000)
- Outside Looking In (2000)

=== Live albums ===
- Message Live (2006) - bonus tracks include the original recording of "FINE LINE" and "Just One Step Away".

== Sources ==
- HAL B. SELZER: Flashback!
- Message Live, CD Baby
- Re: Dean Fasano - RIP
- https://web.archive.org/web/20110301145720/http://sfarzo.us/Documents/News_Reel_Archive/Reel_12.pdf
- Dean Fasano (1990)
- Message, Musicdetector
- MESSAGE / OUTSIDE LOOKING IN, Escape Music ESM054, Produced by: Steve Morris
- MESSAGE "Message"
- Message Fine Line
