= Robert Fleischman =

American singer

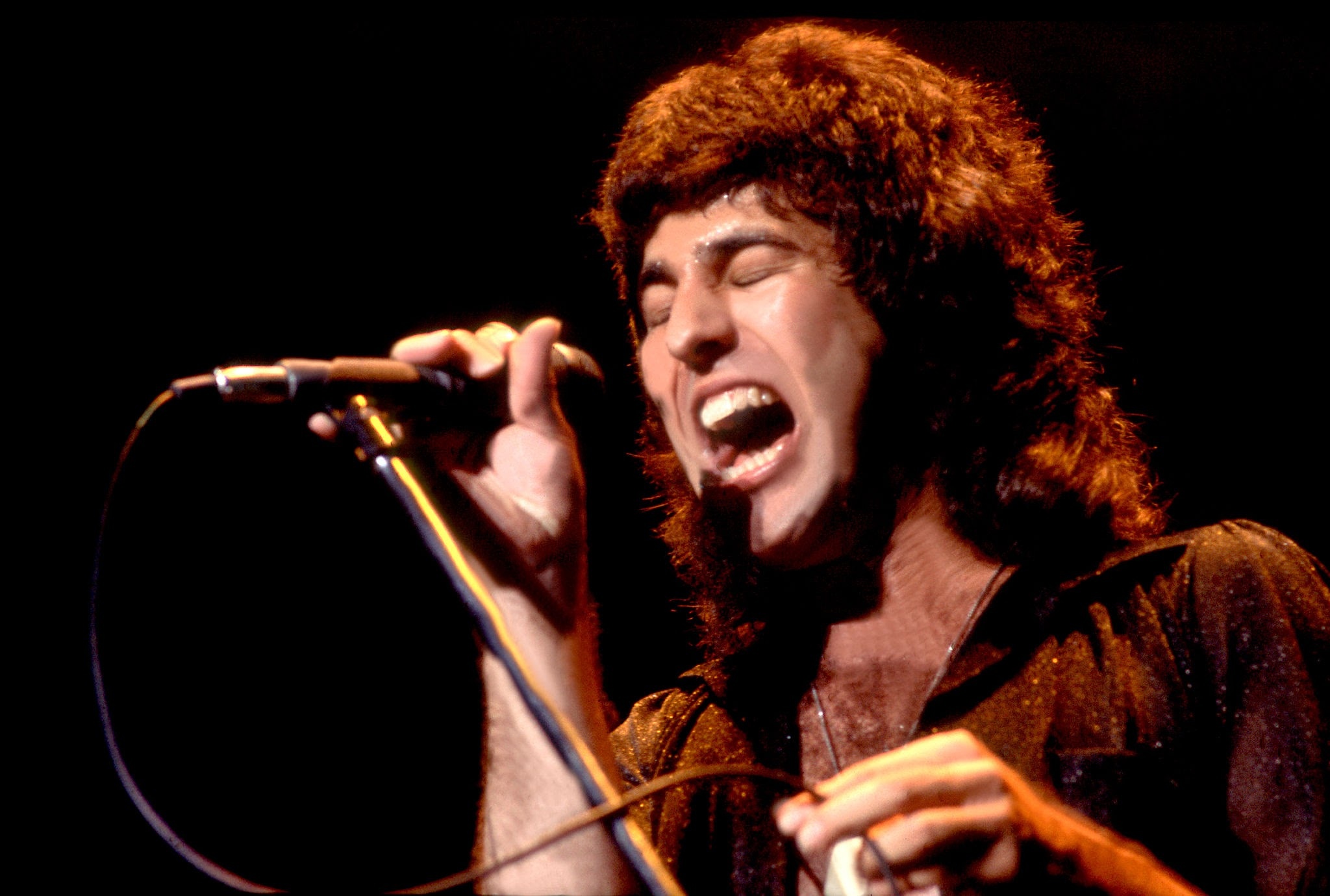

Background information
- Born: March 11, 1953 (age 73)
- Genres: Rock; hard rock; progressive rock; glam metal; heavy metal
- Occupations: Singer; songwriter
- Years active: 1977–present
- Member of: Vinnie Vincent Invasion
- Formerly of: Journey; Channel; The Sky

Robert Fleischman (born March 11, 1953) is an American singer and songwriter. He is known for briefly working with the rock band Journey as their lead vocalist in 1977 and occasionally thereafter as a songwriting collaborator.

== Biography ==
Fleischman, originally the frontman of Los Angeles band Shatterminx in 1975, is perhaps best known as the lead singer for the rock band Journey from March until October 1977, between the group's albums, Next and Infinity. He appeared in live concert performances with Journey and co-wrote and recorded numerous studio demo tracks during the band's early writing sessions for the upcoming album, Infinity. Three of those co-written tracks appear on the album: "Anytime", "Wheel in the Sky" (reaching #57 on the Billboard charts), and "Winds of March".

The only officially released Journey song featuring Fleischman's vocals is "For You" which can be found on Journey's box-set release, Time^{3}. Fleischman also re-recorded it, as "All for You", for his 1979 solo album Perfect Stranger. He may have also contributed to the track "Velvet Curtain" (also found on Time^{3}) which was later re-written as "Feeling That Way" and credited to Aynsley Dunbar, Steve Perry, and Gregg Rolie.

While former Journey manager Herbie Herbert stated that he was fired for personality differences, Fleischman maintains that he was already signed to another manager, Barry Fey, and left Journey over management complications but remained friends with the band.

In January 2005 when Journey received a star on the Hollywood Walk of Fame, Fleischman was one of Journey's specially invited guests at the Journey: Past and Present ceremony.

Fleischman was also associated with the English rock group Asia for a short time, from 1985 to 1986. Already known to bandmember Carl Palmer, John Kalodner of Geffen Records introduced him to Asia's John Wetton as the possible new lead singer for the group. After working on new material together, it became apparent to Fleischman that Wetton's voice was actually best suited for the material; after discussing this with the band, he amicably left the project and returned to America.

He has also been part of the band Channel, along with guitarist Tony Berg, bassist Trey Thompson, and originally with drummer Art Wood (not to be confused with the singer Art Wood) . This line-up of the band wrote the song "The Way I Feel". By the time Channel's self-titled album was recorded in 1984 however, Thompson's former Black Rose band-mate Gary Ferguson had joined as drummer, and would later appear on Robert's solo album Dreaming in Tongues (2004).

In 1986, Fleischman appeared with the Vinnie Vincent Invasion, featuring the ex-KISS guitarist Vinnie Vincent, on their self-titled album and later on the unreleased album Guitars From Hell (1991). In 1996, Vincent released a compact disc called The EP, which featured Robert on vocals. The EP was also released under the name Euphoria.

In 2004, Fleischman recorded an AOR version of the "Lord's Prayer" for Liberty N' Justice for their album Welcome to the Revolution. Fleischman is also known for scoring soundtracks for TV and film, notably That '70s Show and the pilot episode of SpongeBob SquarePants. Many of his ambient scores can be found on the solo albums Kinetic Phenomena and Electric Raindrops, both released in 2004.

In early 2009, Fleischman announced the formation of a new band, The Sky, with whom he released the Majestic in 2014.

== Solo albums ==
- Perfect Stranger (1979), which featured many guest musicians including Jimmy Crespo of Aerosmith, John McVie of Fleetwood Mac, and former bandmates Neal Schon and Gregg Rolie of Journey.
- World in Your Eyes (2002), which was produced by former Hurricane and current Foreigner singer Kelly Hansen
- Electric Raindrops (2004), the first of two albums of Robert's ambient scores
- Kinetic Phenomena (2004), which, like its predecessor, showcases Robert's TV and film scoring ability
- Dreaming in Tongues (also 2004) featuring Gary Ferguson, and Cameron Stone
- Look at the Dream (2007)

== Ensemble releases ==
- Channel (1984)
- Vinnie Vincent Invasion's self-titled album (1986)
- "For You" on Time^{3} with Journey (1992)
- Euphoria with Vinnie Vincent (1996)
- The Lord's Prayer with the band Liberty N' Justice for their album Welcome to the Revolution (2004).

== Composing with Journey ==
- Infinity (1978)
- Greatest Hits (1988)
- Time^{3} (1992)
- Greatest Hits Live (1998)
- The Essential Journey (2001)
- Live in Houston 1981: The Escape Tour (2005)
- Revelation (2008) Bonus Disc

== Discography ==
- Infinity with Journey (1978) as a songwriter (see above for Journey compilations)
- Perfect Stranger (solo, 1979)
- Channel's self-titled album (1984)
- Vinnie Vincent Invasion's self-titled album (1986)
- Guitars from Hell (1991) with Vinnie Vincent (unreleased)
- "For You" on Time^{3} with Journey (1992)
- Euphoria with Vinnie Vincent (1996)
- World in Your Eyes (solo, 2002)
- The Lord's Prayer on the album Welcome to the Revolution with the band Liberty N' Justice (2004)
- Electric Raindrops (solo, 2004) as composer and musician
- Kinetic Phenomena (solo, 2004) as composer and musician
- Dreaming in Tongues (solo, 2004)
- Look at the Dream (solo, 2007)
- Emotional Atlas (solo, 2024)
