= Resolution (Andy Timmons album) =

Studio album by Andy Timmons
- Released: May 2, 2006
- Recorded: 2005–2006
- Genre: Instrumental rock
- Length: 47:27
- Label: Favored Nations
- Producer: Andy Timmons and Mike Daane

Andy Timmons chronology
| That Was Then, This Is Now (2002) | Resolution (2006) | Theme from a Perfect World (2016) |

Resolution is a 2006 album by instrumental rock solo artist Andy Timmons.

== Track listing ==
1. Deliver Us – 4:02
2. Helipad' – 4:47
3. Ghost of You – 5:07
4. Resolution – 5:39
5. Redemption – 3:42
6. Lydia – 3:43
7. Gone (9/11/01) – 3:49
8. Move On – 2:58
9. Beware Dark Days – 6:06
10. The Prayer / The Answer – 4:52
11. Headed For The Ditch – 3:18 (hidden track)

== Personnel ==
- Andy Timmons - Guitars
- Mike Daane - Bass
- Mitch Marine - Drums
