= Mark Allen Lanoue =

American scientist and musician

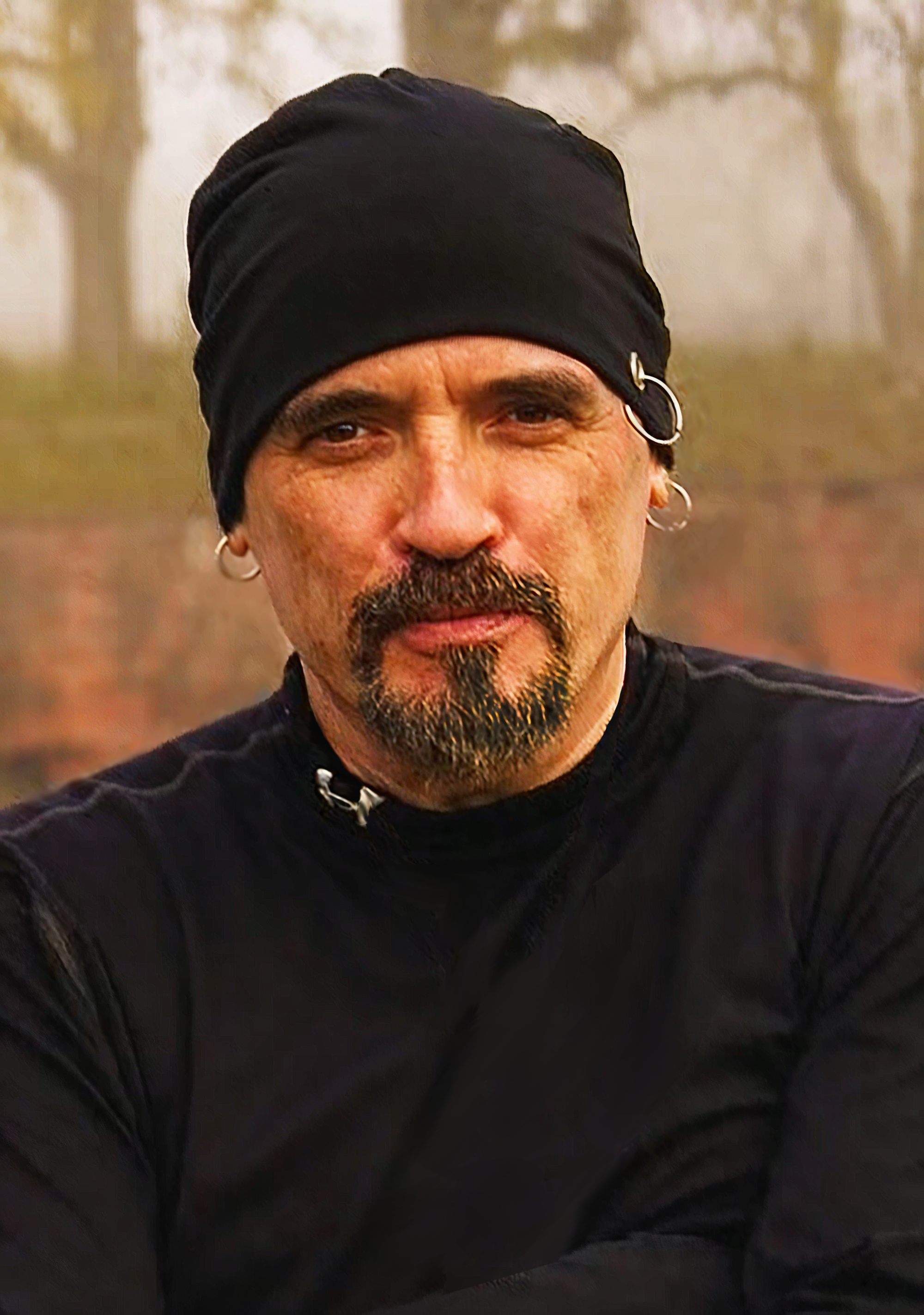
- Lanoue in 2021
- Born: June 6, 1966 (age 60); Elizabeth, New Jersey, U.S.
- Occupations: Scientist; inventor; musician; singer; songwriter
- Years active: 1984–present
- Awards: Space Technology Hall of Fame
- Musical career
- Genres: Rock; heavy metal; alternative
- Instruments: Vocals; guitar
- Label: Gemini Rising Records
- Website: markallenlanoue.com

Mark Allen Lanoue (born June 6, 1966) is an American scientist, inventor, musician, singer, and songwriter. He was inducted into NASA's Space Technology Hall of Fame for his work in developing and commercializing portable hyperspectral sensors. As a lead vocalist, musician, and songwriter, he was a member of the band Biloxi and Kick the Wicked, who were nominated for a Hollywood Independent Music Award in 2023.

== Early life and education ==
Born in Elizabeth, New Jersey, Lanoue started playing the guitar when he was 17 years of age and was awarded a band scholarship. He received his bachelor's degree in computer science and his MBA at the University of Southern Mississippi. In 2026, Lanoue obtained his PhD from the University of Arkansas, through the Environmental Dynamics Interdisciplinary Program under the guidance of Dr. Zhang Ryan Tian.

== Career ==
=== Science and technology ===
In 1996, while Lanoue was an imaging scientist and sensor systems engineer at the Institute for Technology Development (NASA's Stennis Space Center), he was instrumental in developing the Portable Hyperspectral Sensor (significantly reducing its size); a non-invasive imaging system that would allow users of the system to analyze interactions of various targets related to its interaction with the electromagnetic spectrum. Hyperspectral sensors opened a range of new diagnostic applications to include precision farming and monitoring the health of astronauts during spaceflights. For his role in its development, he was inducted into the NASA Space Technology Hall of Fame in 2005.

In 2008, Lanoue became the CEO of Themis Vision Systems. During his tenure, Themis created hyperspectral hardware, software, and algorithm development, building 40 custom systems, including three at the FBI’s hyperspectral imaging laboratory in Quantico, Virginia. Themis installed the first UV hyperspectral system in China to help with studies in forensic science and fingerprint analysis. Between 2006-2013, Lanoue obtained eight patents which utilized hyperspectral sensors including developing an expert system for controlling plant growth in a contained environment at NASA's Stennis Space Center in 2009. In 2013, he founded PhiLumina, partnering with the Space Foundation as a Certified Space Technology Partner.

In 2010, Lanoue traveled to Xi'an, China where he conducted the first hyperspectral imaging of the Terracotta Army. In 2014, he presented his research on spectral matching of pigments for ancient artifacts at the 40th International Symposium on Archaeometry (ISA) at the Getty Museum in Los Angeles, California.

In 2020, Lanoue was part of a team that was awarded the Chancellor's Art and Technology grant from the University of Arkansas for The "21st Century Music Industry: Imagining a New Role for Higher Education," a collaborative project that created a new internal unit, Razorback Music. The project functioned as a student-led 21st century record label, production and entertainment company, and digital music industry platform to bridge the gap between higher education and the music and entertainment industry.

In 2022, Lanoue joined the University of Arkansas College of Engineering as the managing director of the Center for High Frequency Electronics & Circuits for Communication Systems (CHECCS).

In 2024, he and his colleagues at UARK, published an article, reporting a solution synthesis for achieving a new photocatalytic core–shell consisting of a titanate nanowire and reduced graphene oxide shell. The new core–shell nanocomposite maximizes a specific surface area, significantly improving detection in the RF field, which is now offered for use in the public health sector.

== Music ==
Lanoue is a singer, songwriter, and musician (guitarist). He was the lead singer and guitarist for the band, Biloxi who headlined Rocklahoma in 2008. Lanoue is the co-founder, lead singer, songwriter, and guitarist for bands Kick the Wicked and Fiction Syxx. In 2023, Kick the Wicked was nominated for a Hollywood Independent Music Award for Best Rock/Heavy Metal Band as well as winning a World Songwriting Award for Best Rock Song for "Firefly." Their single, "White Rabbit" appeared in film, Black Creek.

=== Discography ===
- 2007: Message Live (Bonus Track) - songwriter
- 2008: Biloxi - In The Wake Of The Storm - songwriter, guitar, lead vocals, background vocals
- 2012: Liberty N' Justice - Hell Is Coming To Breakfast - guitar
- 2013: Liberty N' Justice (with JK Northrup) - The Cigar Chronicles -
- 2017: Fiction Syxx - Tall Dark Secrets - songwriter, lead guitar, acoustic guitar, lead vocals, background vocals
- 2019: Fiction Syxx – The Alternate Me - songwriter, lead guitar, acoustic guitar, lead vocals
- 2021: Fiction Syxx - Ghost Of My Fathers Past - songwriter, guitar, lead vocals
- 2025: Heartbanger - After The Storm - lead vocals
