= Paul Laine =

Canadian musician

- Origin: Vancouver, British Columbia, Canada
- Genres: Country, glam metal, melodic rock
- Occupations: Singer, musician
- Instruments: Vocals, guitar, keyboards, organ, percussion

Paul Robert Laine is a Canadian musician. He began his professional career as a solo artist, then was the singer of Danger Danger out of New York for eleven years, then fronted his own band, Shugaazer. Laine now has a band called "Darkhorse," whose album Let It Ride was released on April 29, 2014. He also teamed up with his former Danger Danger bandmates Bruno Ravel and Rob Marcello to form "The Defiants," who released their debut self-titled album on April 15, 2016.

In 2022, Paul teamed up with Lee Revill with the new band, Jet Set Junkies.

2024 found Paul joining the Canadian Music Hall of Fame group Trooper as lead singer.

== Discography ==
=== Solo albums ===
- Stick It in Your Ear (1990)
- Can't Get Enuff (1996)
- The Long Road Back (2026)

=== With Danger Danger ===
- Dawn (1995)
- Four the Hard Way (1997)
- The Return of the Great Gildersleeves (2000)
- Cockroach (2001)
- Live and Nude (2005)

=== With Shugaazer ===
- Shift (2004)

=== With Andersen-Laine-Readman ===
- III (2006)

=== With Darkhorse ===
- Let It Ride (2014)

=== With The Defiants ===
- The Defiants (2016)
- Zokusho (2019)
- Drive (2023)
