= Euphoria (Vinnie Vincent album) =

EP by Vinnie Vincent
- Released: 1996
- Genre: Heavy metal; hard rock
- Length: 21:42
- Label: Metaluna
- Producer: Vinnie Vincent; Phil Kenzie

Vinnie Vincent chronology
All Systems Go (1988)	Euphoria (1996)	Judgement Day Guitarmaggedon (2026)

Euphoria, originally released as simply The EP is a 1996 EP by Vinnie Vincent, self released on Vincent's own Metaluna label. The purpose was to preview material for an album called Guitarmageddon which has yet to materialize. In 2021, Vincent said that Guitarmageddon would come out in the next "12 to 18 months", ultimately however, this did not come to fruition.

It was recorded in the early 1990s with Vincent on guitar and bass guitar, former Vinnie Vincent Invasion vocalist Robert Fleischman, and drummer Andre LaBelle. These sessions were paid for by Enigma Records who were to release the full record, Vincent ended up dissatisfied with the recordings. For reasons unknown, Vinnie Vincent overdubbed LaBelle's drums with a drum machine before releasing it in 1996.

== Track listing ==
All tracks are written by Vinnie Vincent.

No.	Title	Length
1.	"Euphoria"	5:21
2.	"Get the Led Out"	6:14
3.	"Wild Child"	5:11
4.	"Full Shredd"	4:56

== Personnel ==
- Vinnie Vincent - guitars, bass, backing vocals
- Robert Fleischman - lead vocals
- V. Meister - drums (credit only)

Uncredited musicians

- Andre LaBelle - drums (drums were overdubbed with a drum machine before release)

=== Production ===
- Phil Kenzie - Co-producer, engineer
- Vinnie Vincent - Producer, engineer
