= Bang Bang (Danger Danger song) =

1989 single by Danger Danger

Single by Danger Danger

from the album Danger Danger
- Released: 1989
- Recorded: 1989
- Genre: Glam metal
- Length: 3:56
- Label: CBS
- Songwriters: Bruno Ravel, Steve West
- Producer: Lance Quinn

Danger Danger singles chronology
"Bang Bang" (1989)	"Monkey Business" (1992)

"Bang Bang" is a song by the American rock band Danger Danger. It was the fifth track on the band's eponymous debut album, Danger Danger (1989). It was written by band bassist Bruno Ravel and drummer Steve West. Danger Danger's second single, it peaked at No. 39 on the Billboard Mainstream Rock Tracks chart and No. 49 on the Billboard Hot 100 chart in 1990. It was the band's only single to chart in the United States. The song's music video was popular, making the MTV Video Countdown Top Ten.

== Charts ==
Chart (1990)	Peak position
US Billboard Hot 100	49
US Mainstream Rock Airplay (Billboard)	39
US Cash Box Top 100	47
