= Kiss My Ankh =

Kiss My Ankh: A Tribute to Vinnie Vincent

Compilation album by various artists
- Released: August 27, 2008
- Recorded: January – August 2008
- Genre: Hard rock, heavy metal
- Length: 52:39
- Label: SplitScreen Entertainment
- Producer: Various

Kiss My Ankh: A Tribute to Vinnie Vincent is a 2008 tribute album featuring a variety of artists covering songs written (or co-written) by Vinnie Vincent. The album consists of new recordings of songs from Vincent's careers with Kiss and the Vinnie Vincent Invasion. Featured artists include Steve Brown of Trixter, Troy Patrick Farrell of White Lion, T.J. Racer of Nitro, Sheldon Tarsha of Adler's Appetite, Chris Caffery of Savatage and Trans-Siberian Orchestra, Ryan Roxie of the Alice Cooper band, and rock & roll comic C.C. Banana, who performs a parody of the Kiss song "Unholy" (rewritten as a roast of Danger Danger vocalist Ted Poley).

== Track listing ==
| No. | Title | Writer(s) | Artist | Length |
|---|---|---|---|---|
| 1. | "Killer" | Simmons/Vincent | DoubleVirgo | 3:36 |
| 2. | "I Still Love You" | Stanley/Vincent | Gods of Fire | 4:57 |
| 3. | "Lick It Up" | Stanley/Vincent | Future 86 | 4:40 |
| 4. | "A Million to One" | Stanley/Vincent | Steve Brown | 4:04 |
| 5. | "Boyz Are Gonna Rock" | Vincent | Mike Weeks | 5:25 |
| 6. | "Back on the Streets" | Vincent/Freeman | Jazan Wild | 3:57 |
| 7. | "That Time of Year" | Vincent | Adler's Appetite | 4:24 |
| 8. | "Love Kills" | Vincent | Vic Rivera / Kelli McCloud | 5:53 |
| 9. | "Unholy" | Simmons/Vincent | Curse God and Die | 6:58 |
| 10. | "I Just Wanna" | Stanley/Vincent | The Dead Zookeepers | 4:24 |
| 11. | "Shout It Out Loud" | Simmons/Stanley | C.C. Banana (with Chris Caffery) | 3:42 |

== Name ==
The album title is a play on words, combining the phrase "kiss my ass" (also the name of a Kiss tribute album) with a reference to the Egyptian nature of Vinnie Vincent's Kiss character (who wore a golden ankh symbol on his face).
