= Fargo Rock City =

Book by Chuck Klosterman

Fargo Rock City: A Heavy Metal Odyssey in Rural Nörth Daköta
- 2002 paperback edition cover
- Author: Chuck Klosterman
- Language: English
- Subject: Music, memoir
- Publisher: Scribner
- Publication date: May 22, 2001
- Publication place: United States
- Media type: Print (hardcover and paperback)
- Pages: 288
- ISBN: 0-7432-0227-9
- OCLC: 45202097
- Followed by: Sex, Drugs, and Cocoa Puffs: A Low Culture Manifesto

Fargo Rock City: A Heavy Metal Odyssey in Rural Nörth Daköta is a book written by Chuck Klosterman, first published by Scribner in 2001. It is a history of heavy metal music, with a particular emphasis on the glam metal that flourished during Klosterman's formative years in the mid-to-late 1980s, through its demise in the early 1990s, and potential rebirth in the late 1990s. It was awarded the ASCAP Deems Taylor Award for criticism in 2002.

== Summary ==
Along with analysis and commentary, the book is interspersed with Klosterman's memories of growing up as a heavy metal fan in Wyndmere, North Dakota, and later experiences at the University of North Dakota and in Akron, Ohio. These auto-biographical segments are the main storyline. The subtitle of the book employs metal umlauts over the o's in "North Dakota". Such marks have been used decoratively in the names of many heavy metal bands, such as Mötley Crüe and Motörhead, both of whom are discussed in the book.

The title is a reference to Detroit Rock City.

== Film adaptation ==
A screenplay written by Craig Finn and Tom Ruprecht was finished in 2009.

We’d get together every day at noon and write till six. We had one computer in the room and one notebook, and we’d alternate scenes. I’d write a scene on the computer, then he’d look at it and make any changes; meanwhile he’d be writing a scene in the notebook that he’d type up, and I’d look at it, make any changes. We could probably do four scenes a day.

== See also ==
- Music of North Dakota
