= The Metro All Stars =

Danny Mangold
- Also known as: The Metros
- Origin: Minnesota, U.S.
- Genres: Rock, Soul
- Years active: 1980s
- Labels: A&M, Capitol, Music Supervisor
- Past members: Andy Bailey; Dusty Cox; Andy Gauthier; Jody Hanks; Danny Mangold; Larry Stock

Danny Mangold was in a band composed of Andy Bailey (keyboards), Dusty Cox (saxophone, keyboards), Andy Gauthier (drums), Jody Hanks (vocals), Danny Mangold (lead guitar) and Larry Stock (bass guitar). It was a second-place finalist on the talent show Star Search.

Mangold helped secure the band a recording contract with MTM/Capitol Records, which specialized in country music and released a self-titled album in 1986. The first single, "After the Passion's Gone," saw medium to heavy rotation on MTV and on the east coast, particularly in Philadelphia, and was positively reviewed in Billboard Magazine. The band broke up in 1987.

After moving to Seattle, Washington, Mangold was introduced to Charles Neville and Mark Cardenas. Mangold guested as one of the guitar players on their "Dreaming in Color" record.

Mangold customized guitars for Prince and Janet Jackson among others at Knut-Koupe Music in Minneapolis before moving to the Pacific Northwest. In 1989, with his mother Marlys, he opened "Danny's Music" in Everett, Washington, a rare and vintage guitar shop, whose clients included Green Day, Nirvana, Heart, and many other well-known musicians.

On April 21, 2001, he was seriously injured when his car went off the road and crashed near Seattle. Mangold's injuries caused him to close down Danny's Music and sell the inventory to pay his medical expenses.

Mangold's other guitar playing/touring projects include a CD with Chris Barron of the Spin Doctors (Heart of the City), with proceeds going to the Everett Women's Shelter in 1997. Drummer on the project, Ben Smith, introduced Mangold to Ann Wilson from Heart/Lovemongers. Over 2000-2001, Mangold filled in for Nancy Wilson on various live dates, and was hired as the lead guitar player for Heart's then-upcoming tour when his accident occurred in 2001. Today, fully recovered from his injuries, Mangold continues to produce music in Seattle for Music Supervisors, Los Angeles.
