= Alec John Such =

American bassist (1951–2022)

- Born: Alexander John Such; November 14, 1951; Yonkers, New York, U.S.
- Died: June 5, 2022 (aged 70) Aynor, South Carolina, U.S.
- Genres: Rock; hard rock; glam metal
- Occupation: Musician
- Instrument: Bass
- Years active: 1980–1994; 2001; 2018
- Formerly of: Bon Jovi

Alexander John Such (November 14, 1951 – June 5, 2022) was an American musician, best known as the original bassist of rock band Bon Jovi. He played in the band from 1983 to 1994, appearing on their first five studio albums.

== Biography ==
Such was of Hungarian and German descent. He started his musical career in the New Jersey band Phantom's Opera, who performed both covers and original songs. In the early 1980s he also played in the hard rock band Message, which included guitarist Richie Sambora. During this time Such also managed the Hunka Bunka Ballroom in Sayreville, New Jersey, where he booked Jon Bon Jovi & the Wild Ones. He was asked to join Jon Bon Jovi's band in 1983. Bon Jovi's first manager, Peter Mantas, credits much of the classic Bon Jovi lineup to Alec's connections in the local music scene: "Without Alec, there would not have been Tico [Torres], who he had played with in Phantom's Opera, and there wouldn't have been Richie."

Alex Such announced in 1994 that he would not play on the band's next album, citing Jon Bon Jovi's criticism of his bass playing, but said that he would still tour with the band. He was let go from the band later that year. Such's departure from Bon Jovi was the band's first major lineup change. He was unofficially replaced by Hugh McDonald, who had played on the original version of the Bon Jovi single "Runaway" before joining officially. It was revealed later on in a document "Thank You, Goodnight: The Bon Jovi Story" that, apart from his musical abilities, his problems with drugs and alcohol also contributed to his dismissal.

After departing Bon Jovi, Such ended his career as a performing artist, stating in 2000, "I don't miss being in a band; I don't want any of that. I want to meet people and if they don't believe I was in Bon Jovi, I won't care. I don't think I've picked up a guitar since I left the band." He remained involved in the music industry behind the scenes during the 1990s as a manager for bands such as Chicago-based 7th Heaven. Such made a guest appearance at a Bon Jovi show at Giants Stadium in 2001 where he performed with the band on "Wanted Dead or Alive".

With Bon Jovi, Such was inducted into the Rock & Roll Hall of Fame in 2018. He played onstage with them for the last time as part of the induction ceremony, and it's also known as the last time that the band's original line-up played together.

Raised in Perth Amboy, New Jersey, Such was a longtime resident of Colts Neck Township, New Jersey, where he kept many music artifacts in his home.

== Death ==
On June 5, 2022, around 2:15 AM, Such woke up at his South Carolina home to use the bathroom. On his way back to bed, he called out to a friend who was staying with him. The friend helped Such get back into bed and then left the room. When the friend came back later to check on him, Such was found dead due to a heart attack at the age of 70.
