= Saraya (band) =

- Origin: New Jersey, United States
- Genres: AOR, hard rock, glam metal
- Years active: 1987–1992
- Labels: Polydor/PolyGram, SBK

Saraya was an American hard rock band, based in New Jersey and featuring singer Sandi Saraya, guitarist Tony "Bruno" Rey, keyboardist Gregg Munier, bassist Gary Taylor, and drummer Chuck Bonfante. The band is best known for their 1989 song "Love Has Taken Its Toll".

== History ==
In 1987, Sandi Saraya and keyboardist Gregg Munier began performing under the name Alsace Lorraine. They eventually travelled to Los Angeles in search of stardom, changing their name to Saraya, because Sandi was the face of the band. After a short stint in Los Angeles, the band returned to New Jersey where Saraya and Munier spent the next year writing material for their debut album. Later in 1987, Saraya and Munier were joined by former Danger Danger guitarist Tony "Bruno" Rey, bassist Gary Taylor, and drummer Chuck Bonfante.

Saraya released their self-titled debut on PolyGram Records in 1989. Executives at PolyGram hoped to eventually develop Sandi Saraya into a sex symbol, making her the "Next Bon Jovi". Promoters wanted to establish Saraya as a good rock band and gradually establish Sandi's sex appeal as the band received more exposure. The debut album saw some success, spending 39 weeks on the Billboard 200, peaking at No. 79. Their first single, "Love Has Taken Its Toll" reached No. 64 on the Billboard 100, on the week of August 12, 1989, and their followup "Back to the Bullet" peaked at No. 63 on the week of December 2. The ballad "Timeless Love", released by future EMI label SBK Records, was actually recorded as a Sandi Saraya solo project and she was accompanied by session musicians, only that it was credited to her true band's name. Still, "Timeless Love" became their third and last single on the Hot 100, staying even lower at No. 85 on the week of January 20, 1990. Produced and penned by Desmond Child, it was Saraya's only song written and recorded for a film, in that case the horror comedy Shocker. Child explained in November 1989 that, pressed to meet a deadline, he got the idea to wrap Sandi Saraya in huge chains so that she could give her all in singing her lines during the "Timeless Love" session, after explaining to her the background of the song, because her previous takes were unemotional and unsuccessful. She later asked to be chained during the overdubs.

After the first album, there were several line-up changes. Barry Dunaway (formerly of Yngwie Malmsteen) replaced Gary Taylor on bass. Munier recorded keyboards and backing vocals on the second album, When the Blackbird Sings, but was unhappy with the direction of the music as it was more guitar driven. He later left the band and was replaced with guitarist John Roggio.

== After break-up ==
Sandi Saraya (now Sandra "Sandi" Saraya) was briefly married to Brian Wheat of Tesla in the early 90s, but their marriage ended due to touring pressures. She then married actor Brendan Kelly in 1995 and lives in Princeton, New Jersey.

Gregg Munier died on February 3, 2006, at the age of 44, from complications of pneumonia. He is survived by his two sons, Shayne and Lucas.

Tony Rey has been playing, writing and recording with, as well as producing, many artists in the music industry, from Joan Jett to Enrique Iglesias to Rihanna.

In October 2010, Saraya planned to reunite for the Firefest Music Festival in the UK. Issues between Sandi Saraya and the Firefest Team, however, prevented the band from performing at the festival.

== Final members ==
- Sandra "Sandi" Saraya - lead vocals, tambourine (1987-1992)
- Tony "Bruno" Rey - lead and rhythm guitar, backing vocals (1987-1992)
- Chuck Bonfante - drums, percussion (1987-1992)
- Barry Dunaway - bass guitar, backing vocals (1990-1992)
- Johnny "John" Roggio - rhythm and lead guitar, keyboards, backing vocals (1991-1992)

== Past members ==
- Gregg Munier - keyboards, piano, backing and lead vocals (1987-1991; died 2006)
- Gary "Skid" Taylor - bass guitar, backing vocals (1987-1990)

== Discography ==
=== Studio albums ===
==== Saraya (1989) ====
- Track list and credits taken from European CD pressing.
- Produced by Jeff Glixman.

No.	Title	Writer(s)	Length
1.	"Love Has Taken Its Toll"	Tony Bruno; Sandi Saraya	5:21
2.	"Healing Touch"	Gregg Munier; Saraya; Sandy Linzer	4:43
3.	"Get U Ready"	Munier; Saraya; Linzer	3:11
4.	"Gypsy Child"	Munier; Saraya; Linzer	4:39
5.	"One Night Away"	Munier; Saraya; Bruno	4:39
6.	"Alsace Lorraine"	Munier	0:50
7.	"Runnin' Out of Time"	Munier; Saraya; Linzer	4:14
8.	"Back to the Bullet"	Munier; Saraya; Linzer	3:58
9.	"Fire to Burn"	Munier; Saraya; Linzer; Fredy Azizaj	4:38
10.	"Saint Christopher's Medal"	Munier; Saraya; Linzer	4:21
11.	"Drop the Bomb"	Munier; Saraya; Linzer	5:54

2010 Bad Reputation reissue bonus tracks
No.	Title	Writer(s)	Length
12.	"Seducer"	Saraya; Bruno	6:10
13.	"In The Shade Of The Sun"	Saraya; Bruno	4:44
14.	"Chainsmokin'"	Saraya; Bruno	3:19
15.	"Timeless Love"	Desmond Child	4:08

==== When the Blackbird Sings... (1991) ====
- Track list and credits taken from U.S. CD pressing.
- Produced by Peter Collins.

No.	Title	Writer(s)	Length
1.	"Queen of Sheba"	Sandi Saraya; Tony Bruno	6:17
2.	"Bring Back the Light"	Saraya; Bruno	6:05
3.	"Hitchin' a Ride"	Saraya; Bruno	5:44
4.	"When You See Me Again..."	Saraya; Bruno	4:37
5.	"Tear Down the Wall"	Saraya; Bruno; Gregg Munier	5:27
6.	"Seducer"	Saraya; Bruno	6:11
7.	"When the Blackbird Sings..."	Saraya; Bruno; Munier	5:29
8.	"Lion's Den"	Saraya; Bruno	4:14
9.	"In the Shade of the Sun"	Saraya; Bruno	4:44
10.	"White Highway"	Saraya; Munier	5:08
11.	"New World"	Saraya; Bruno	3:36

=== Singles ===
==== Love Has Taken Its Toll (1989) ====
- 7-inch single (Polydor 889 292-7) / Cassette single (Polydor 889 292-4)
1. "Love Has Taken Its Toll" – 5:21
2. "Running Out of Time" – 4:14
- EU 12-inch single (Polydor 889 293-1) / UK CD single (Polydor 889 293-2)
1. "Love Has Taken Its Toll" – 5:21
2. "Running Out of Time" – 4:14
3. "Fire to Burn" – 4:38
- US CD promo (Polydor CDP 45)
1. "Love Has Taken Its Toll" (Edit) – 4:33
2. "Love Has Taken Its Toll" (Album version) – 5:21

==== Back to the Bullet (1989) ====
- Cassette single (Polydor 889 976-4)
1. "Back to the Bullet" (Rock Mix) – 3:40
2. "Fire to Burn" – 4:38
- CD promo (Polydor CDP 129)
1. "Back to the Bullet" (Rock Mix) – 3:40
2. "Back to the Bullet" (Pop Mix) – 3:40

==== Timeless Love (1989) ====
From the soundtrack for the film Shocker.

- Cassette single (SBK Records 4JM-07316)
1. "Timeless Love" – 4:08
2. "Shocker" (performed by The Dudes of Wrath) – 3:58
- CD promo (SBK Records DPRO-05321)
1. "Timeless Love" (Single Edit) – 3:45
2. "Timeless Love" (Album version) – 4:08

==== Seducer (1991) ====
- UK 7-inch single (Polydor PO 149)
1. "Seducer" – 6:11
2. "In the Shade of the Sun" – 4:44
- UK 12-inch single (Polydor PZ 149)
1. "Seducer" – 6:11
2. "In the Shade of the Sun" – 4:44
3. "Chainsmokin'" – 3:19
- UK CD single (Polydor PZCD 149)
1. "Seducer" – 6:11
2. "In the Shade of the Sun" – 4:44
3. "Chainsmokin'" – 3:19
4. "Love Has Taken Its Toll" – 5:21
- US CD promo (Polydor CDP 439)
1. "Seducer" (Album version) – 6:11
2. "Seducer" (Heavy Intro) – 4:58
3. "Seducer" (Acoustic Intro) – 4:45

==== Hitchin' a Ride (1991) ====
- CD promo (Polydor CDP 499)
1. "Hitchin' a Ride" (Radio Edit) – 4:39
2. "Hitchin' a Ride" (Album version) – 5:44
