= International Music Camp =

Fine arts summer school in North Dakota

Coordinates: 48.98356°N 100.056433°E

The International Music Camp is a summer camp held annually at the International Peace Garden on the North Dakota-Manitoba border. The camp offers week-long and month-long intensive programs in the fine arts, including music, dance, drama, creative writing, and painting.

It was founded in 1956 by music educator Dr. Merton Utgaard and his wife Noella. Utgaard was the camp's full-time director for more than 25 years, and received the North Dakota Theodore Roosevelt Rough Rider Award posthumously for his efforts.

The Frances Leach Music Library was opened at the International Music Camp in 1975. The camp's 1976 Tour Band and Choir was selected to represent North Dakota at the United States Bicentennial celebrations at the John F. Kennedy Center for the Performing Arts.
