= Andy Timmons =

American guitarist (born 1963)

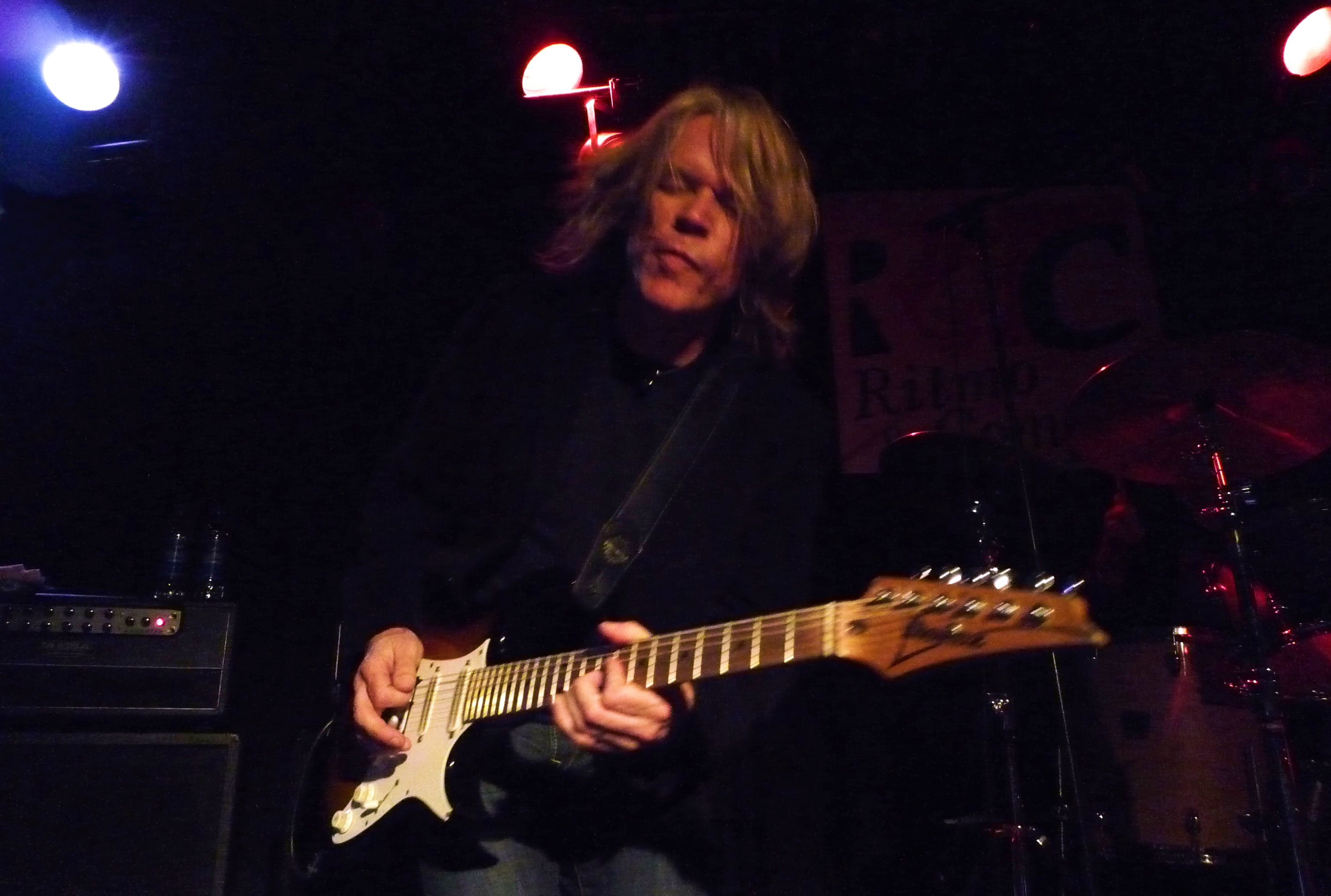
- Timmons - live in Madrid 2010

Background information
- Born: July 26, 1963 (age 63); Scottsdale, Arizona, United States
- Genres: Instrumental rock, hard rock, glam metal, blues rock, jazz fusion
- Occupation: Musician
- Instrument: Guitar
- Years active: 1982–present
- Label: Favored Nations
- Formerly of: Danger Danger
- Website: andytimmons.com

Andy Timmons (born July 26, 1963) is an American guitarist who has played in the bands Taylor Bay Band, Danger Danger, Pawn Kings, and Andy Timmons Band (ATB). He has also released several solo albums and has worked as a session guitarist.

Timmons is highly regarded for his technical proficiency. He has been consistently sought after by Ibanez in production of signature guitar models since the 1990s, and has been an in-demand session guitar player and solo artist for over three decades.

He has released two CDs on Favored Nations, the first being That Was Then, This Is Now and Resolution on May 2, 2006.

== Biography ==
Timmons was born in Scottsdale, Arizona and moved to Evansville, Indiana as a child. He graduated from Evansville Harrison High School in 1981 and studied classical guitar at the University of Evansville before transferring to the University of Miami to study jazz guitar.

As guitarist for glam metal band Danger Danger, he toured the world opening for Kiss and Alice Cooper, sold over a million records worldwide, and had two #1 videos on MTV, and amassed a discography that includes seven solo releases that range from guitar instrumentals, to blues, and even a Beatles/Elvis Costello-inspired collection of pop tunes.

Timmons's many collaborations include a live CD with Olivia Newton-John (Timmons had been her music director-guitarist for many U.S. tours), two albums by Kip Winger, recording sessions for Paula Abdul and Paul Stanley, and radio and television jingles. He has also played alongside Steve Vai, Joe Satriani, Paul Gilbert, Eric Johnson, Steve Morse, Mike Stern, Ace Frehley, Ted Nugent, Reb Beach, and Pierre Bensusan, as well as some of his favorite 1960s singing stars such as the Beach Boys, Lesley Gore, and Gordon Waller.

Playing with drummer/bandleader Simon Phillips on four albums between 1997 and 2015, Timmons demonstrated a range extending well beyond rock and pop music, delivering energetic jazz fusion that earned both critical and audience acclaim.

The Andy Timmons Band released their new album, entitled "Andy Timmons Band Plays Sgt. Pepper" on October 25, 2011.

Andy also contributed the "Grabbag" music to the video game Duke Nukem Forever in 2011.

In August 2014, Timmons participated in the G4 Experience—a week-long guitar camp—with fellow guitarists Joe Satriani, Paul Gilbert, and keyboardist/guitarist Mike Keneally.

On October 26, 2014, Andy reunited with former Danger Danger band members for the 25th Anniversary of the band, which took place at the Firefest in Nottingham. On September 30, 2016, the Andy Timmons Band released their new album, Theme from a Perfect World.

His 2022 solo album Electric Truth was ranked as the 6th best guitar album of 2022 by Guitar World readers.

He currently resides in McKinney, Texas.

== Discography ==
=== Danger Danger ===
- Danger Danger (1989) (tracks 3 & 7)
- Screw It! (1991)
- Cockroach (2001, recorded 1993)

=== Pawn Kings ===
- Andy Timmons and the Pawn Kings (1995)
- Andy Timmons and the Pawn Kings Live (1998)

=== Solo ===
- Ear X-Tacy (1994)
- Ear X-Tacy 2 (1997)
- Orange Swirl (1998)
- The Spoken and the Unspoken (1999)
- And-Thology 1 & 2 - The Lost ear-X-tacy Tapes [Compilation] (2000)
- That Was Then, This Is Now [Compilation] (2002)
- Electric Truth (2022)
- Recovery (2025)

=== Andy Timmons Band ===
- Resolution (2006)
- Andy Timmons Band Plays Sgt. Pepper (2011)
- Theme from a Perfect World (2016)

=== with Maylee Thomas ===
- Here Comes the Son - An Acoustic Christmas (2006)

=== Simon Phillips ===
- Another Lifetime (1998)
- Out of the Blue (Live, 1999)
- Protocol II (2013)
- Protocol III (2015)

=== Kip Winger ===
- This Conversation Seems Like a Dream (1996)
- Songs From The Ocean Floor (2000)

=== Ted Pearce ===
- Big Metuselah: Human Sacrifice (2000)
- Hallelu Et Adonai: Praise The Lord (2005)

Preceded by Tony "Bruno" Rey	Danger Danger Guitarist ?	Succeeded by Bruno Ravel
