= Tony Rey =

- Genres: Rock; glam metal
- Occupations: Guitarist; record producer; music director
- Instrument: Guitar

Tony "Bruno" Rey is an American guitarist, writer, producer and arranger who has worked with bands including Saraya, the Mike Pont Band, Danger Danger, Billy Joel, Janet Jackson, Enrique Iglesias, Joan Jett and the Blackhearts, Kathie Lee, Taylor Dayne, Anastacia and Rihanna.

He also wrote and recorded with Arthur Tisi and Foreigner co-founder and keyboardist Al Greenwood

In Danger Danger, he replaced guitarist Al Pitrelli and was replaced by guitarist Andy Timmons. He played almost all of the guitar work on Danger Danger's self-titled album, with his replacement Andy Timmons playing the rest.

Rey started with Iglesias in 1999 and is the guitarist and musical director. He is responsible for all facets of Iglesias' live shows, TV shows, and award shows. Rey also writes and produces for Iglesias. One song he co-wrote was "Roamer" from Iglesias' album, 7. Rey also provided guitar and background vocals on Janet Jackson's single "Just a Little While".

== Discography ==
=== 1980s ===
Writing songs with Aldo Nova

- Saraya (1989)
- Danger Danger (1989)

=== 1990s ===
- When the Blackbird Sings, Saraya (1991)
- Scepter Records Story (1992)
- Flashback, Joan Jett (1993)
- Pure and Simple, Joan Jett (1994)
- Tank Girl Soundtrack (1995)-Vocals
- Living the Nightlife (1995)-Producer
- Biggest Man, Tommy Hunt (1997)-Producer
- We Will Fall: The Iggy Pop Tribute (1997)-Producer, Guitar
- New York Soul Serenade (1997)-Producer
- Under Cover, Joe Lynn Turner (1997)-Vocals(Background)
- Naked Without You, Taylor Dayne (1997)-Guitar(electric)
- Four the Hard Way, Danger Danger (1997) -Producer, Guitar
- Hurry Up & Wait, Joe Lynn Turner (1998)-Soloist, Guitar
- Where the Girls are, Vol 2 (1999)-Producer
- Under Cover, Vol 2 Joe Lynn Turner (1999)-Guitar

=== 2000s ===
- The Return of the Great Gildersleeves, Danger Danger (2000) - Guitar
- Heart of a Woman, Kathie Lee (2000)-Guitar
- Chansons des Perverts (2001)-Performer
- Naked Without You[Bonus Tracks], Taylor Dayne (2001)-Guitar(electric)
- Leap of Faith, David Charvet (2002)-Guitar
- Walk to Remember Soundtrack (2002)-Producer
- Walk to Remember[Bonus Tracks] (2003)-Producer
- Jett Rock: Greatest Hits, Joan Jett (2003)-Arranger
- 7, Enrique Iglesias (2003)-Producer, Vocal Arranger, Guitar (Acoustic/Electric)
- 7 [bonus tracks], Enrique Iglesias (2003)-Producer
- Damita Jo, Janet Jackson (2004)-Guitar
- Girl Group Sounds: One Kiss Can Lead to (2005)-Producer
- Sinner, Joan Jett (2006)-Engineer

== TV appearances ==
Date	Program	Notes 2000 Howard Stern Show with Enrique Iglesias
February 10, 2008	50th Grammy Awards	Introduced by Rihanna on Red Carpet and shown sitting with Enrique Iglesias
February 6, 2008	The Tonight Show with Jay Leno	As Enrique Iglesias' guitarist

Preceded by Al Pitrelli	Danger Danger Guitarist ?	Succeeded by Andy Timmons
