= Rob Marcello =

Swedish guitarist

Robert Marcello
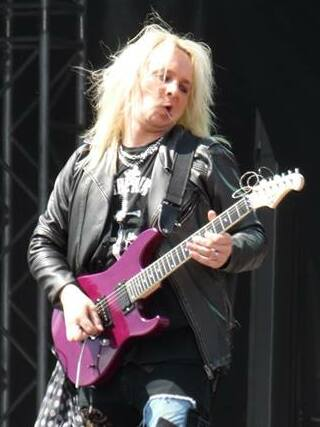
- Marcello performing at the 2014 Sweden Rock Festival

Background information
- Birth name: Robert Wendelstam
- Born: 9 September 1977 (age 47); Örebro, Sweden
- Genres: Hard rock, heavy metal, neoclassical
- Occupation: Guitarist
- Member of: Danger Danger

Robert Marcello (born Robert Wendelstam; 9 September 1977) is a Swedish guitarist who has been a member of the hard rock band Danger Danger since 2003. He has also played for Ironhorse, Obsession, Twenty 4 Seven, and Marcello-Vestry. In late 2009, he was also a stand-in guitarist in the 1980s band House of Lords.

Marcello plays Caparison Guitars and is sponsored by Boss Corporation, he is featured as the guitarist for many of their pedal demonstration videos.

== Discography ==
=== With Iron Horse ===
- Iron Horse (2001)

=== With Twenty 4 Seven ===
- Destination Everywhere (2002)

=== With Danger Danger ===
- Live and Nude (2005)
- Revolve (2009)

=== With Marcello-Vestry ===
- Marcello-Vestry (2008)

=== With Laney's Legion ===
- Laney's Legion (2014)

=== With Shotgun ===
- Live at decadencia drive (2016) (Shotgun Messiah's first record played almost entirely live with half the original band- Zinny Zan and Stixx)

=== With The Defiants ===
- Self titled (2016)
- Zokusho (2019)
- Drive (2023)
