= Screw It! =

Studio album by Danger Danger
- Released: October 1991
- Recorded: 1991
- Studios: New River, Fort Lauderdale, Florida
- Genres: Hard rock; hair metal
- Length: 57:30
- Label: Epic
- Producers: Bruno Ravel; Steve West

Danger Danger chronology
Down and Dirty Live (1990)	Screw It! (1991)	Dawn (1995)

Screw It! is the second album by the American rock band Danger Danger, released in 1991. The song "Monkey Business" peaked at No. 42 on the UK Singles Chart.

== Production ==
The album was produced by Bruno Ravel and Steve West. It was recorded at New River Studios in Fort Lauderdale, Florida. Ginger Lynn provided the moans on "Yeah, You Want It!"

== Critical reception ==
Professional ratings
Review scores
Source	Rating
Calgary Herald	C
Chicago Tribune	1/4 stars
Rock Hard	8.0/10

The Calgary Herald noted that "most of the music and pedantic lyrics tend to irritate instead of stimulate." The Chicago Tribune deemed "Yeah, You Want It!" an "offensive, date-rape anthem."

AllMusic wrote that "the music overall appears to have been constructed in hopes of pleasing both the mainstream pop audience and hair-sprayed headbangers."

== Track listing ==
All songs written by Steve West and Bruno Ravel, except for where noted.

1. "Ginger Snaps (Intro)
2. "Monkey Business" - 5:22
3. "Slipped Her the Big One" (West, Andy Timmons) - 5:32
4. "C'est Loupé (Prelude) / Beat the Bullet" - 4:53
5. "I Still Think About You" - 4:36
6. "Get Your Shit Together" - 4:41
7. "Crazy Nites" - 4:14
8. "Puppet Show" - 1:20
9. "Everybody Wants Some" - 4:15
10. "Don't Blame It on Love" - 3:58
11. "Comin' Home" - 4:39
12. "Horny S.O.B." - 3:22
13. "Find Your Way Back Home" - 6:14
14. "Yeah, You Want It!" - 3:34
15. "D.F.N.S." - 0:50

== Personnel ==
Band

- Ted Poley – lead and backing vocals
- Andy Timmons – electric and acoustic guitars, backing vocals
- Kasey Smith – keyboards
- Bruno Ravel – 4- and 12-string basses, backing vocals, cello
- Steve West – drums, out of tune vocals

Guests

- Gary Cherone, Nuno Bettencourt, Pat Badger – backing vocals (2), rap (13)
- Ginger Lynn: voice
- Eddy Conard: percussion
- Todd "T-Boy" Confessore
- Mom – violin
- Dad – violin
- Bruno – violin
- Koen VanBaal
- Ravel String Quartet

== Charts ==
Chart (1991)	Peak position
Japanese Albums (Oricon)	67
US Billboard 200	123
