= Liberty N' Justice =

Christian hard rock band

Liberty N' Justice (LNJ) is a Christian hard rock band started in 1991 by Justin Murr and Patrick Marchand with bandmates: Robert Earl Sliger; Angie Beckett; Kim; and James Beckett. The original lineup was dissolved m. In 2002, Murr continued with the Liberty N' Justice name, contacting several well-known artists to join him in creating the new album Welcome to the Revolution. They have continued through the past two decades, collaborating with such special guest vocalists such as Lou Gramm of Foreigner, Chris Jericho of Fozzy, Phil Collen of Def Leppard, Sebastian Bach, Leif Garrett, Michael Sweet of Stryper, C.J. Snare of Firehouse, Rubicon Cross, Jack Russell of Great White, Kip Winger of Winger, Donnie Vie and various others.

MelodicRock.com praised LNJ for "moments of greatness...(with) great melodies and lead vocal performances to bridge the gap between modern and traditional hard rock."

Christian Metal Central wrote, "with an impressive lineup of musicians and vocalists the like never seen on a Christian rock compilation CD...(Liberty N' Justice) has earned a place in...history."

In 2011, LNJ released "Sin," the final song recorded by Jani Lane before he died.

== Discography ==
- Armed With The Cross (1992)
- Big Guns (1994)
- Forever Till The End (1996)
- Bargain Bin (2000)
- Welcome to the Revolution (2004)
- Soundtrack of a Soul (2006)
- Independence Day (2007)
- 4-All: The Best Of LNJ (2008)
- Light It Up (2010)
- Chasing A Cure LP (2011)
- Hell Is Coming To Breakfast (2012)
- Before The Revolution:best of lnj the early years (2012)
- The Cigar Chronicles (2013)
- 4-All: The Best Of LNJ 2 (2013)
- The Vow (2014)
- Life Songs EP (2016)
- Better Than Maroon 5 EP (2017)
- Fiddle While Rome Burns (2021)
