= C.C. Banana =

Music personality (1969–2012)

Anthony John Confessore (1969–2012), better known as C.C. Banana, was a music personality, known for conducting interviews for Metal Sludge while wearing a large yellow banana costume. Banana was profiled by such publications as Classic Rock Magazine, The Aquarian and the New York Press, and was a recurring guest on Sirius Satellite Radio.

== History ==
The name "C.C. Banana" was inspired by Poison guitarist C.C. DeVille, who was charging fans money for autographs, photos, and handshakes at a 2001 Poison concert Confessore attended. At the concert Confessore, then unknown, decided to do the same, while wearing a banana costume that was in the back of his friend's car.

He continued wearing the banana costume, sometimes modifying it. For interviews with Star Wars personalities, C.C. Banana donned a Jedi robe and calls himself "Bananakin Skywalker." When conducting himself within the Kiss community, he often dressed as original Kiss guitarist Ace Frehley and referred to himself as "Ace Peeley."

In 2007, he appeared on the Sci Fi Channel reality series Who Wants to Be a Superhero? and in 2008, he was a featured guest on the weekly Fuse TV series Talking Metal On Fuse. Later in 2008, he appeared on the Kiss tribute album KISS MY ANKH: A Tribute To Vinnie Vincent, for which he recorded a parody of the Kiss song "Unholy", rewritten as a roast of Danger Danger vocalist Ted Poley. The parody also featured a guitar solo by Chris Caffery of Savatage and Trans-Siberian Orchestra.

=== Death ===
Confessore committed suicide at his New Jersey home on May 21, 2012. He was reportedly in financial trouble as a result of his extensive investment in the tribute album Whole Lotta Love—an All-Star Tribute to Fat Chicks. He left a suicide note on his Facebook page.
