= Danger Danger =

American rock band

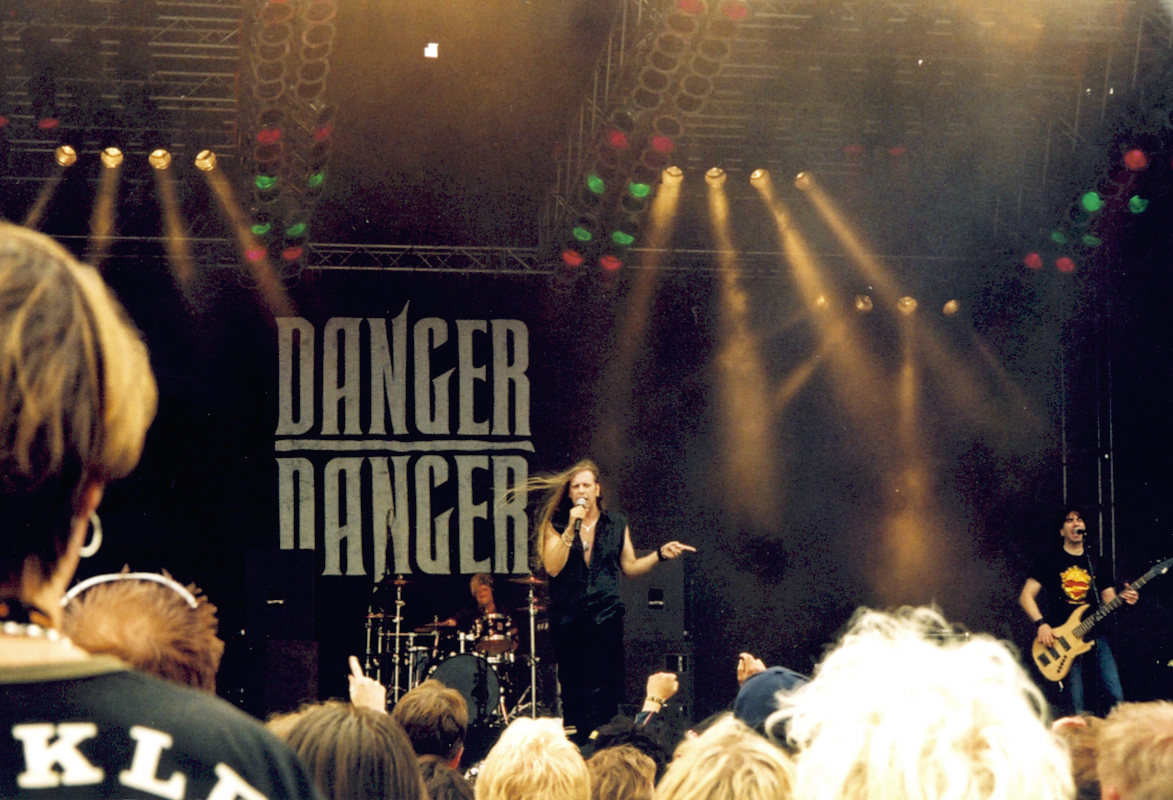
- Danger Danger at the 2004 Sweden Rock Festival

Background information
- Origin: Queens, New York, U.S.
- Genres: Hard rock; glam metal; AOR
- Years active: 1986–present (Note: hiatus 1995–1997)
- Labels: Epic; D-Rock; Frontiers
- Members: Bruno Ravel; Steve West; Ted Poley; Rob Marcello
- Past members: Kasey Smith; Al Pitrelli; Mike Pont; Tony "Bruno" Rey; Andy Timmons; Paul Laine
- Website: www.dangerdanger.com

Danger Danger is an American hard rock band formed in Queens, New York, in 1986.

They are part of the East Coast 80s hard rock scene that also included bands like Bon Jovi, Skid Row and White Lion. According to AllMusic, the band "mixed pop hooks and good looks with hard-edged guitar riffs."

== History ==
Danger Danger was formed in 1986 by former Hotshot members lead vocalist Mike Pont (joined in 1987), bassist Bruno Ravel, and drummer Steve West (joined in 1987). This lineup also featured then future Savatage and Megadeth guitarist Al Pitrelli and keyboardist Kasey Smith. Mike Pont later left the band and was replaced by Ted Poley, who previously played in the band Prophet as drummer, and sometimes lead vocalist. Somewhere during this time, they made a failed attempt at recording a demo.

They made another attempt at recording a demo and this time it landed them a recording contract with Epic Records. In 1988, Pitrelli left Danger Danger. Shortly after, Pont and Pitrelli reunited to form a new lineup of Hotshot. Since then, Pitrelli has played in various other bands. Pitrelli played on most of the Danger Danger compilation album Rare Cuts.

In 1988, Saraya guitarist Tony Rey joined briefly and played on part of their debut album, before returning to his previous band. Andy Timmons replaced him and played on the rest of their self-titled debut album, which was released the following year. The album spawned two hits with "Naughty Naughty" and "Bang Bang", with the former gaining a spot in MTV's Headbangers Ball. The band went on tour opening for Kiss, Alice Cooper, Extreme and Warrant. Before Danger Danger, he was in the band Hotshot with original Danger Danger lead vocalist Mike Pont and Danger Danger bassist Bruno Ravel. After that, the band went on to record their follow-up in Fort Lauderdale, Florida, releasing Screw It! in 1991. The album spawned two other hits with "Monkey Business" and "I Still Think About You" and again they went on tour with Kiss. After the tour, Kasey Smith left the band and started a new project titled Shock together with friend and former Get With It drummer Michael Bellusci.

In 1993 the band had finished work with their third album titled Cockroach. However, the band fired singer Poley. Subsequent lawsuits from Poley prevented the album from being released. In the meantime, Paul Laine was hired by Ravel and West as the new singer and he re-recorded the vocals for the new album. When they were about to release the album, Epic thought it was in their best interest to shelve the record. Shortly after that the band and the label parted ways. In addition, guitarist Timmons left the band to pursue a solo career. Timmons went on to play guitar on both of Kip Winger's solo albums.

Ravel and West formed their own label, Low Dice Records, and started working on a new album with Laine. They released Dawn in 1995 which featured a more somber and introspective tone. The album was partly marketed through the band's fan club, newsletter and website. The band recruited bassist Scott Brown, who had previously played with Paul Laine as a solo artist, and they went on tour again in the U.S.

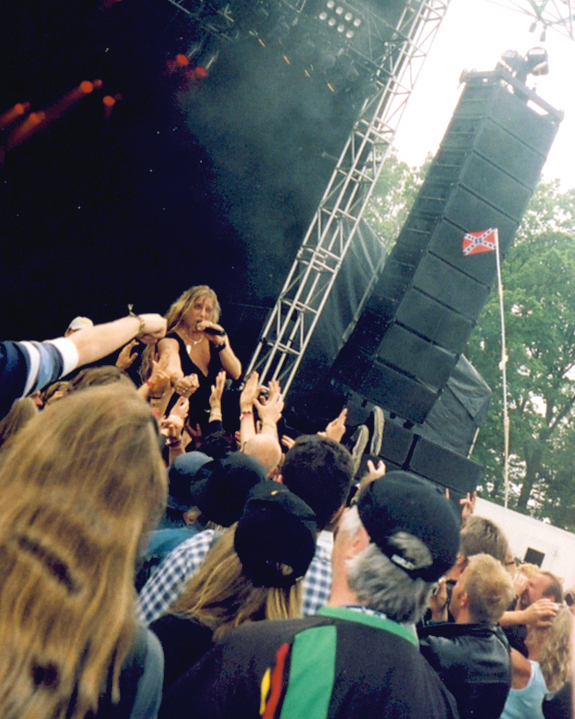
Danger Danger in 2004

The band went back in the studio and released Four the Hard Way in 1997. Former band members Andy Timmons and Kasey Smith contributed to the album, and the band went back on tour. In 2000 they released The Return of the Great Gildersleeves.

In 2001 the band made a unique move after talks with Epic, releasing Cockroach, which was supposed to be their third album, but could not be released for legal issues. The album featured two discs with two versions of the album, one with Laine on vocals and the other with Ted Poley. In 2002 the song "Naughty Naughty Christmas" was featured in the Tim Allen movie The Santa Clause 2. They followed Cockroach with Rare Cuts in 2003, a collection of unreleased and rare tracks including early demos with original member Pitrelli, now playing with Megadeth and Trans-Siberian Orchestra, that were recorded in his mother's laundry room. In 2004 Laine left the band and original singer Poley returned. However, in 2005 the band still released, Live and Nude, which was recorded in 2003 and featured Laine on vocals.

In 2008 rock and roll comic C.C. Banana recorded a song called "Ted Poley", released on the album Kiss My Ankh. The song is a parody of the Kiss song "Unholy", inspired by the story of Poley's first encounter with Kiss lead singer Paul Stanley.

On September 19, 2009, the independent label Frontiers Records released Revolve, featuring the return of Poley as lead singer, as well as new member, guitarist Rob Marcello. The album coincided with the 20th anniversary of their debut release for Imagine Records.

The classic lineup of Ted Poley, Bruno Ravel, Steve West, Andy Timmons, and Kasey Smith reunited in 2014 for a series of touring dates.

== Members ==
=== Current members ===
- Bruno Ravel – bass guitar, backing vocals (1986–1995; 1997–present), rhythm guitar (1986, 1997, 1999, 2009), lead guitar (1994–1995, 1995), keyboards (1994–1995, 2009)
- Steve West – drums (1987–1995; 1997–present)
- Ted Poley – lead vocals (1987–1993, 2004–present)
- Rob Marcello – guitar, backing vocals (2003–present)

=== Current touring members ===
- Steve Brown – guitar, backing vocals (2016–present; occasional touring guest)

=== Former members ===
- Al Pitrelli – guitar, backing vocals (1986–1988); keyboards (1986)
- Joe Franco — drums (1986)
- Phil Naro – lead vocals (1986)
- Kasey Smith – keyboards, backing vocals (1986–1992, as guest 1997, 2014)
- Mike Pont – lead vocals (1986–1987)
- Tony "Bruno" Rey – guitar (1988–1989, 1997–2002)
- Andy Timmons – guitar, backing and occasional lead vocals (1989–1994, 2014)
- Paul Laine – lead vocals (1993–1995, 1995, 1997–2003), rhythm guitar (1994–1995, 1995, 1999), keyboards (1994–1995, 1997, 1999, as guest 2009)

=== Former touring/session members ===
- Lester Mendez – keyboards (1993)
- Scott Brown – bass guitar, backing vocals (1995)
- Lance Quinn – keyboards (1999)
- Jaret Reddick – backing vocals (2009)
- Tony Harnell – backing vocals (2009)

== Discography ==
=== Studio albums ===
Title	Release	Peak chart positions	
Title	Release	US	JPN
Danger Danger	1989	88	—
Screw It!	1991	123	67
Dawn	1995	—	—
Four the Hard Way	1997	—	—
The Return of the Great Gildersleeves	2000	—	—
Cockroach	2001	—	—
Revolve	2009	—	145

=== Live albums ===
- Down and Dirty Live EP (1990)
- Live and Nude (2005)

=== Compilation albums ===
- Rare Cuts (2003)

=== Singles ===
Title	Release	Peak chart positions			Album
Title	Release	US	US Main	UK	Album
"Naughty Naughty"	1989	—	—	—	Danger Danger
"Bang Bang"	1989	49	39	—	Danger Danger
"Don't Walk Away"	1990	—	—	—	Danger Danger
"Monkey Business"	1992	—	—	42	Screw It!
"I Still Think About You"	1992	—	—	46	Screw It!
"Comin' Home"	1992	—	—	75	Screw It!

== See also ==
- List of glam metal bands and artists
