= Seann Nicols =

American singer, songwriter, and producer

Seann Nicols (previously known as Sheldon Tarsha) is an American rock singer, songwriter, and music producer known for his association with bands such as Quiet Riot, Adler's Appetite, Bobby Blotzer's Ratt, and Westfield Massacre. He is the voice provider for Synthesizer V's HXVOC voicebank.

== Career ==
=== Adler's Appetite (2005-2009) ===
In 2005, Nicols, then known as Sheldon Tarsha, joined Adler's Appetite, replacing the previous vocalist, Jizzy Pearl. He toured with the band in the US, South America, and Europe, performing the 'Appetite for Destruction' album.

=== Tarsha (2007-2010) ===
During this period, Nicols fronted the band Tarsha, garnering attention with performances alongside bands like Anvil and Steel Panther. In 2010, Tarsha released "The Singles EP" following their 2007 album "Prophecies," which achieved online recognition.

=== Icon (2009-2010) ===
Nicols joined the Phoenix-based rock band ICON in 2009 and performed with the group until May 2010, marking his departure with a performance opening for QUEENSRŸCHE at the Orpheum Theater in Phoenix, Arizona.

=== Name Change (2011) ===
On April 29, 2011, Nicols announced his official name change from Sheldon Tarsha, stating both personal and professional reasons for the change.

=== Quiet Riot (2016-2017) ===
In October 2016, Nicols joined Quiet Riot as a lead vocalist, working on new material for an anticipated 2017 album release on Frontiers Music SRL. His tenure with the band was short-lived due to creative and personal conflicts.

=== Bobby Blotzer's Ratt (2017) ===
Nicols was announced as the new frontman for Bobby Blotzer's Ratt on March 7, 2017, replacing Joshua Alan. He made his live debut with the band on March 18, 2017, at the Prairie Knights Casino & Resort in Fort Yates, North Dakota

=== Westfield Massacre (2017-2018) ===
Joining Westfield Massacre as the new lead vocalist in June 2017, Nicols contributed to their album "Salvation", released in October 2018 through Nerve Strike Records
