= Ted Poley =

American singer

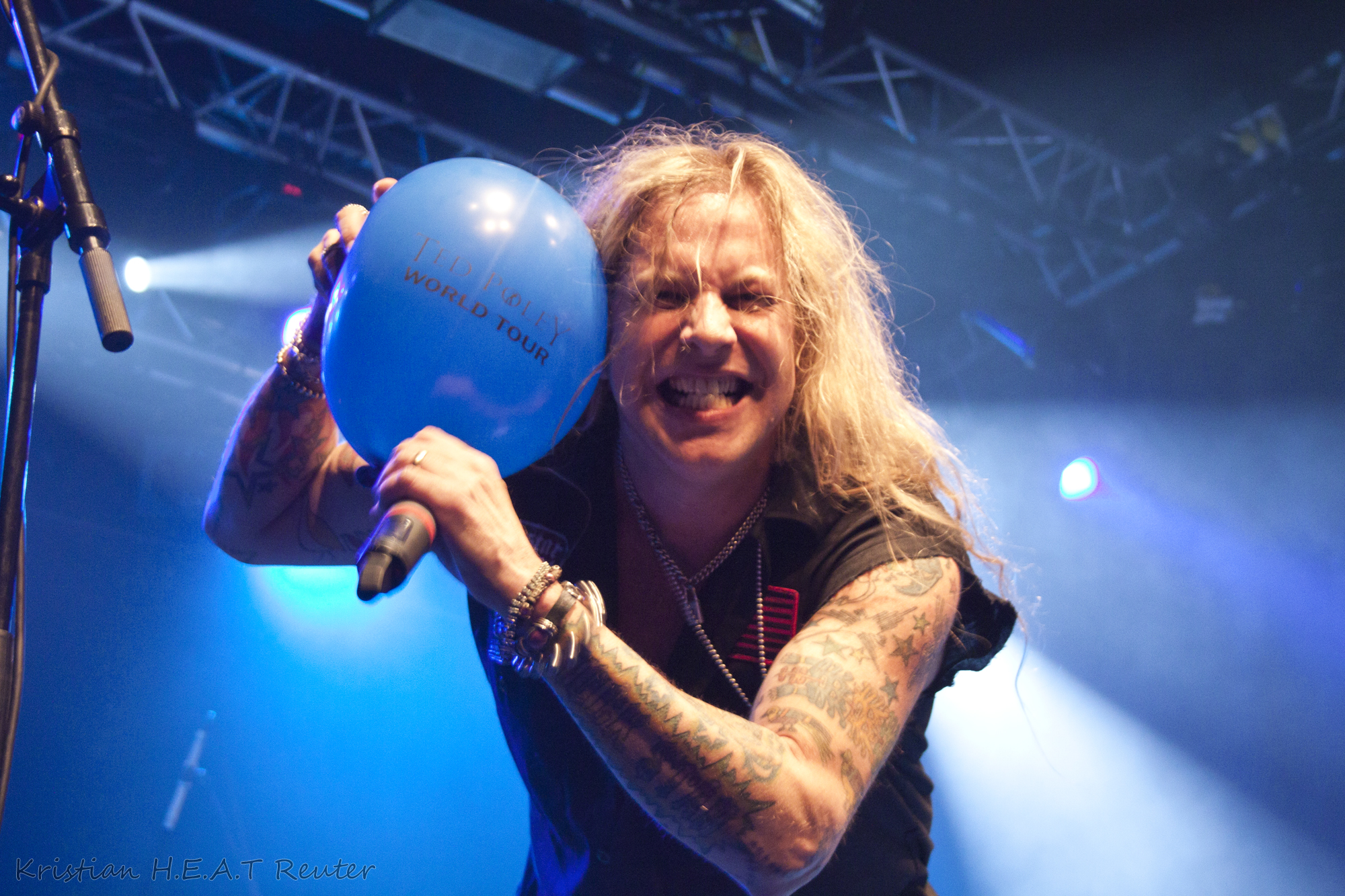
- Poley in 2010

Background information
- Born: Theodore Harris Poley; January 5, 1962 (age 64); Englewood, New Jersey, U.S.
- Genres: Hard rock; glam metal; heavy metal; progressive rock (early)
- Occupations: Singer; songwriter
- Years active: 1981–present
- Member of: Danger Danger; Tokyo Motor Fist
- Formerly of: Lush; Prophet; Bone Machine; Melodica; Pleasure Dome

Theodore Harris Poley (born January 5, 1962) is an American musician who is best known as the lead vocalist of the hard rock band Danger Danger. He previously performed in Prophet as a drummer.

== Biography ==
Theodore Harris Poley was born on January 5, 1959, in Englewood, New Jersey to a Jewish family. His father, a lawyer, wanted his son to become a lawyer too, and in 1977, Poley received his Juris Doctor degree.

However, Ted soon joined progressive rock band Prophet as a drummer, appearing on their self-titled debut album, released in 1985. In addition to playing drums, Poley performed lead vocals on the songs "Heart of the Night", "It's Real" and "Listen to Ya'".

In 1987, Poley was approached by Bruno Ravel to join Danger Danger as a lead vocalist and he accepted. With Danger Danger, Poley enjoyed much success as the band caught the late surge wave of 1980s glam metal. Together they released two albums (Danger Danger and Screw It!) and toured with bands like Kiss, Alice Cooper, and others.

In 1993, he finished recording Danger Danger's third album, Cockroach, but was surprisingly fired from the band. They hired another singer (Paul Laine) and attempted to release the album with new vocals, but Poley sued and prevented the album from being released.

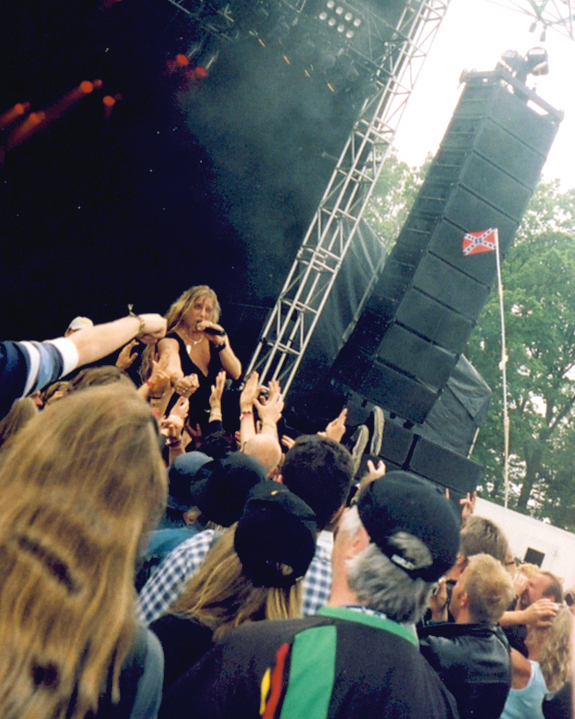
Poley performing with Danger Danger in 2004

The same year, he formed a new band called Bone Machine with guitarist John Allen III (Tommy Lee's band). They released their first album titled Dogs in 1994, touring the UK the following year and releasing the live record Search and Destroy. In 1996, they released their last album titled Disappearing, Inc., notable for featuring an eerie premonition of what would happen in the 2001 9/11 attacks in the cover art.

In 2000, he joined the band Melodica with Gerhard Pichler on guitar. As a band, they released several albums: USAcoustica, and Lovemetal among them. During this time, Poley returned to the U.S. and played for the first time in seven years.

In 2001, Danger Danger finally released the album Cockroach after reaching an agreement with Epic Records. The album featured two discs: one with the Poley vocals, and the other with the new vocals by the band's new singer, Paul Laine.

In 2002, Poley's band (now known as Poley/Pichler) released an album titled Big. This album featured Gerhard Pichler on guitar, Joe Slattery on bass (with whom Poley had played before in Lush back in the early 1980s) and Slattery's bandmate from the melodic rock band Norway, Marty Brasington on drums.

In 2004, he rejoined Danger Danger and started touring with them again.

In 2016, he formed Tokyo Motor Fist with Trixter guitarist Steve Brown. Their first album was released on February 24, 2017.

== In popular culture ==
- Poley has collaborated with Japanese guitarist Jun Senoue for songs in the Sonic the Hedgehog video game series. Such work includes "Lazy Days... Livin' in Paradise" (Sonic Adventure), "Escape from the City" (Sonic Adventure 2), "We Can" (Sonic Heroes), and "Race to Win" (Sonic Rivals 2).
- In 2008, rock & roll comic C.C. Banana recorded a song called "Ted Poley", released on the album "Kiss My Ankh: A Tribute to Vinnie Vincent". The song is actually a parody of the Kiss song "Unholy", inspired by the story of Poley's first encounter with Kiss lead singer Paul Stanley.

== Discography ==
=== Prophet ===
- Prophet (1985)

=== Danger Danger ===
- Danger Danger (1989)
- Down And Dirty Live (1990)
- Screw It! (1991)
- Cockroach (2001)
- Revolve (2009)

=== Bone Machine ===
- Dogs (1994)
- Search and Destroy (Live, 1995)
- Live in the UK (VHS & VCD, 1996)
- Disappearing, Inc. (1996)

=== Melodica ===
- Long Way From Home (2000)
- USAcoustica (2001)
- Lovemetal (2001)
- Livemetal (Live, 2002)
- Live in Springfield

=== Poley/Pichler ===
- Big (2002)

=== Solo career ===
- Collateral Damage (2006)
- Smile (2007)
- Greatestits Vol. 1 (2009)
- Greatest Hits – Volume 2 (2014)
- Beyond the Fade (2016)
- Modern Art (with Degreed) (2018)

=== Pleasure Dome ===
- For Your Personal Amusement (2008)

=== Poley/Rivera ===
- Only Human (2008)

=== Tokyo Motor Fist ===
- Tokyo Motor Fist (2017)
- Lions (2020)
