= All About Lovin' You =

Single by Bon Jovi

from the album Bounce
- Released: May 12, 2003
- Length: 3:46
- Label: Island
- Songwriter(s): Jon Bon Jovi; Richie Sambora; Desmond Child; Andreas Carlsson
- Producer(s): Jon Bon Jovi; Rob Cavallo; Andreas Carlsson

Bon Jovi singles chronology
"The Distance" (2003)	"All About Lovin' You" (2003)	"It's My Life (2003)" (2003)

Music video
- "All About Lovin' You" on YouTube

"All About Lovin' You" is a song by American rock band Bon Jovi. It was released as the fifth and final single from the band's eighth studio album, Bounce (2002).

== Music video ==
The music video for "All About Lovin' You" continues the story of Jack (portrayed by Tom Sandoval) and Jill (portrayed by Rachel Nichols), the young couple from the "Misunderstood" music video. The video begins with Bon Jovi playing in a large room in a New York building, as Jack jumps off the roof of the same building while Jill watches below. Memories of his relationship with her, including his infidelity seen in the beginning and ending (most notably in the uncut version) of the previous video, flashes before him as he falls. As a crowd gathers in shock, Jack releases a parachute with the words "Will You Marry Me?" written on the inside of the parachute, aimed as a proposal to Jill below. He lands safely and they embrace, giving the presumption that she agreed to the proposal.

== Track listings ==
CD

1. "All About Lovin' You" (Jon Bon Jovi, Richie Sambora, Desmond Child, Andreas Carlsson) - 3:45
2. "All About Lovin' You" (Acoustic) (Jon Bon Jovi, Richie Sambora, Andreas Carlsson) - 3:37
3. "Postcards From the Wasteland" (Demo) (Jon Bon Jovi, Richie Sambora, Billy Falcon) - 5:08
4. "All About Lovin' You" (CD-ROM Video)

DVD

1. "All About Lovin' You" (Music Video) - 3:46
2. "Alive" (Demo) - 3:54
3. "Everyday" (Demo) - 2:56
4. "All About Lovin' You" (Making of the Video)

== Charts ==
Chart (2003)	Peak position
Australia (ARIA)	31
Austria (Ö3 Austria Top 40)	27
Belgium (Ultratip Bubbling Under Flanders)	4
Europe (Eurochart Hot 100)	19
Germany (GfK)	21
Ireland (IRMA)	16
Italy (FIMI)	22
Netherlands (Dutch Top 40)	16
Netherlands (Single Top 100)	17
Scotland (OCC)	6
Sweden (Sverigetopplistan)	38
Switzerland (Schweizer Hitparade)	33
UK Singles (OCC)	9
UK Rock & Metal (OCC)	1
