= Tokyo Road: Best of Bon Jovi =

Tokyo Road: The Best of Bon Jovi

Greatest hits album by Bon Jovi
- Released: March 28, 2001
- Recorded: 1983–2001
- Genre: Glam metal; hard rock; pop rock
- Length: 76:58
- Label: Island
- Producer: Tony Bongiovi; Lance Quinn; Bruce Fairbairn; Bob Rock; Peter Collins; Jon Bon Jovi; Richie Sambora; Luke Ebbin

Bon Jovi chronology
One Wild Night Live 1985–2001 (2001)	Tokyo Road: The Best of Bon Jovi (2001)	Bounce (2002)

Tokyo Road: The Best of Bon Jovi – Rock Tracks (TOKYO ROAD～ベスト・オブ・ボン・ジョヴィ－ロック・トラックス) is the third overall greatest hits compilation album by American rock band Bon Jovi, exclusively released in Japan by Island Records in 2001. The album peaked at number five on Oricon's Weekly Albums Chart. It sold more than 400,000 copies and been certified double platinum by the RIAJ.

== Content ==
The first track is a remixed version of "One Wild Night" originally released on the Crush album; the new version was released as a single and featured a music video. This version also appears on the Bon Jovi live compilation One Wild Night Live 1985–2001.

"Tokyo Road" (Live) was released as a promo single in Japan to promote the compilation album. It was also included as a bonus disc on a limited edition of the album. The live version of "Tokyo Road" would later appear on the 2010 special edition of 7800° Fahrenheit.

== Track listing ==
All tracks are written by Jon Bon Jovi, Richie Sambora, and Desmond Child, except where noted.

No.	Title	Writer(s)	From album	Length
1.	"One Wild Night 2001"		Crush (2000)	3:42
2.	"Bad Medicine"		New Jersey (1988)	5:14
3.	"Livin' on a Prayer"		Slippery When Wet (1986)	4:09
4.	"You Give Love a Bad Name"		Slippery When Wet	3:42
5.	"Keep the Faith"		Keep the Faith (1992)	5:44
6.	"It's My Life"	J. Bon Jovi; Sambora; Max Martin	Crush	3:43
7.	"Blood on Blood"		New Jersey	6:15
8.	"Something for the Pain"		These Days (1995)	4:46
9.	"Born to Be My Baby"		New Jersey	4:38
10.	"Tokyo Road"	J. Bon Jovi; Sambora	7800° Fahrenheit (1985)	5:40
11.	"Hey God"	J. Bon Jovi; Sambora	These Days	6:10
12.	"Just Older"	J. Bon Jovi; Billy Falcon	Crush	4:27
13.	"I'll Sleep When I'm Dead"		Keep the Faith	4:41
14.	"Runaway"	J. Bon Jovi; George Karak	Bon Jovi (1984)	3:53
15.	"Wild in the Streets"	J. Bon Jovi	Slippery When Wet	3:55
16.	"Next 100 Years"	J. Bon Jovi; Sambora; Bob Rock	Crush	6:19
Total length:				76:58

First press bonus 3" CD: Tokyo Road Live
No.	Title	Writer(s)	Length
1.	"Tokyo Road" (Live version)	J. Bon Jovi; Sambora	5:40
2.	"Not Fade Away" (Buddy Holly cover;live version from Jon Bon Jovi solo tour)	Buddy Holly; Norman Petty	3:21
3.	"Next 100 Years" (Live version)	J. Bon Jovi; Sambora; Rock	6:36
4.	"Father Time" (Live version from Richie Sambora solo tour)	Sambora; Child	6:33

== Personnel ==
- Jon Bon Jovi – lead vocals, acoustic guitar
- Richie Sambora – guitar, backing vocals
- David Bryan – keyboards, backing vocals
- Alec John Such – bass, backing vocals
- Hugh McDonald – bass guitar, backing vocals
- Tico Torres – drums, percussion

== Certifications ==
Region	Certification	Certified units/sales
Japan (RIAJ)	2× Platinum	400,000^{^}
^{^} Shipments figures based on certification alone.
