= List of UK Rock & Metal Albums Chart number ones of 2001 =

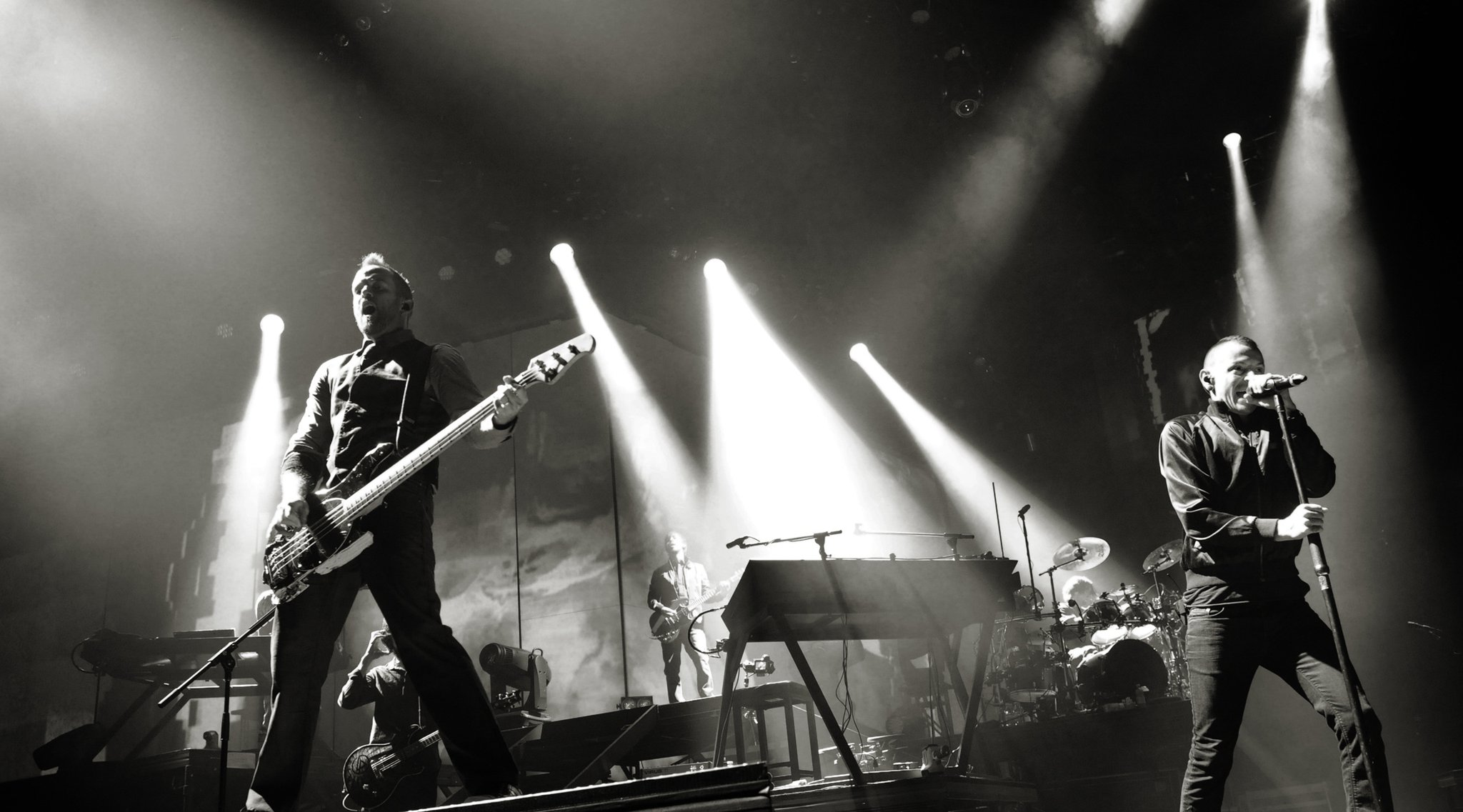
Linkin Park's debut Hybrid Theory was the longest-running UK Rock & Metal Albums Chart number-one album of 2001, spending 18 weeks atop the chart.

The UK Rock & Metal Albums Chart is a record chart which ranks the best-selling rock and heavy metal albums in the United Kingdom. Compiled and published by the Official Charts Company, the data is based on each album's weekly physical sales, digital downloads and streams. In 2001, there were 16 albums that topped the 52 published charts. The first number-one album of the year was Coldplay's debut studio album Parachutes, which remained at number one for the first two weeks of the year at the end of a nine-week run which began on 4 November 2000. The final number-one album of the year was Linkin Park's debut studio album Hybrid Theory, which spent the last four weeks of the year (and the first two weeks of 2002) at number one in its fourth spell of the year at the top of the chart.

The most successful album on the UK Rock & Metal Albums Chart in 2001 was Hybrid Theory, which spent a total of 18 weeks at number one over four spells, including two separate runs of six consecutive weeks (three including the final run, which finished in 2002). Hybrid Theory was the best-selling rock and metal album of the year, ranking 13th in the UK End of Year Albums Chart. Coldplay's Parachutes spent six weeks at number one in 2001; Limp Bizkit's Chocolate Starfish and the Hot Dog Flavored Water was number one for five weeks during the year; Staind's Break the Cycle topped the chart four weeks in 2001; Muse's Origin of Symmetry and the self-titled debut album by Wheatus were number one for three weeks; and three additional albums spent two weeks each at number one.

== Chart history ==
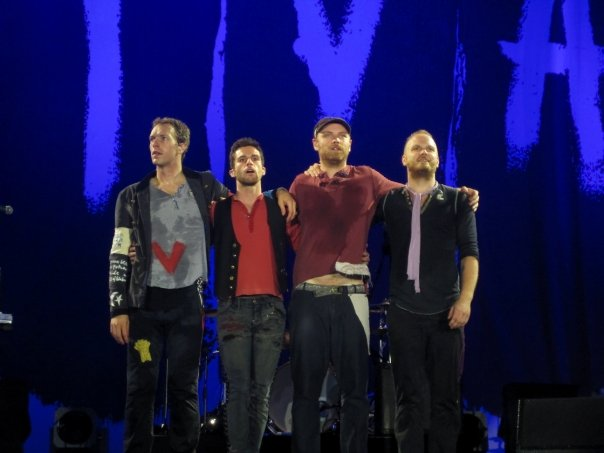
Coldplay's debut album Parachutes spent six weeks at number one on the UK Rock & Metal Albums Chart in 2001.

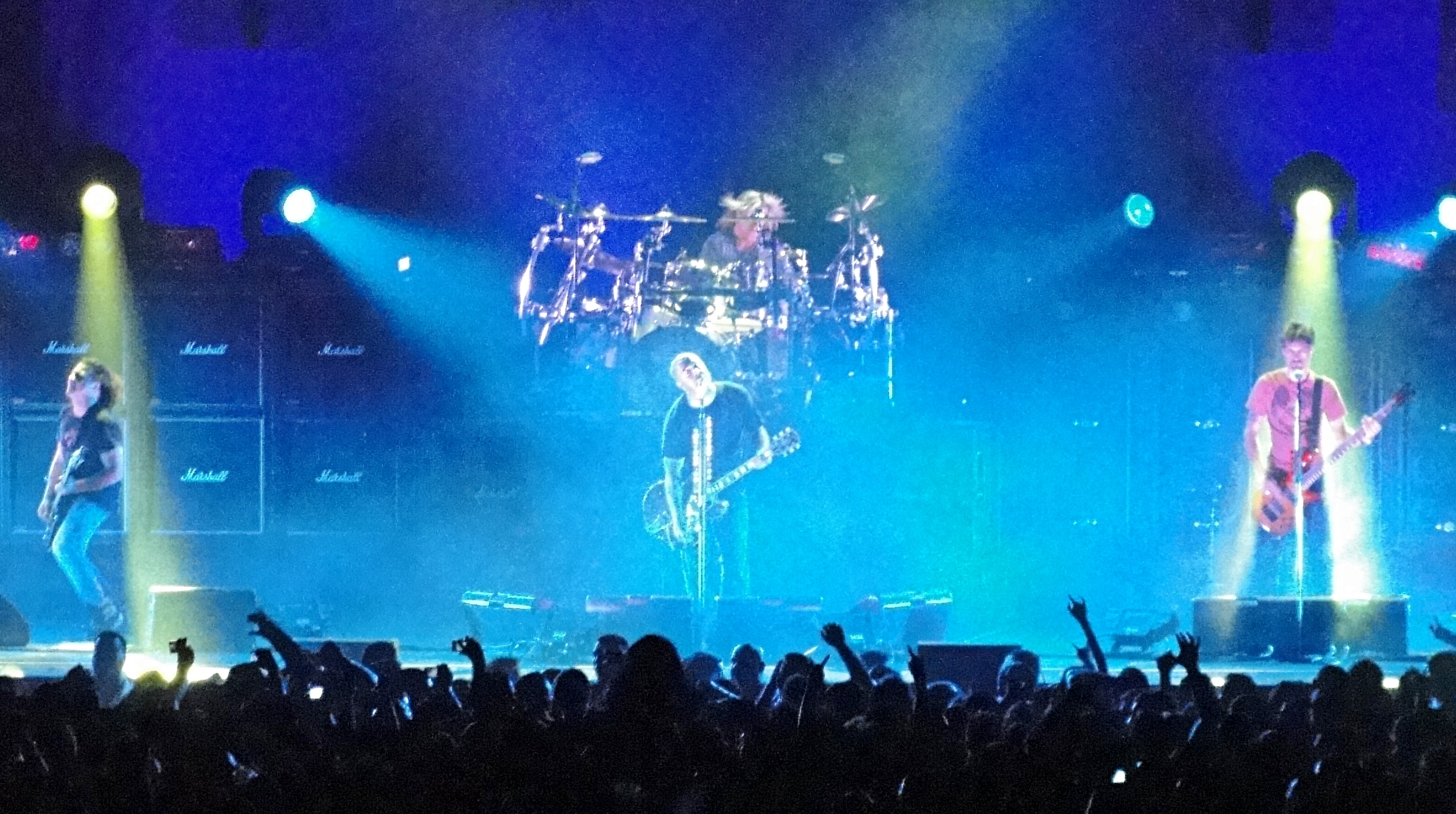
Staind's third studio album Break the Cycle spent four weeks at number one on the chart in 2001.

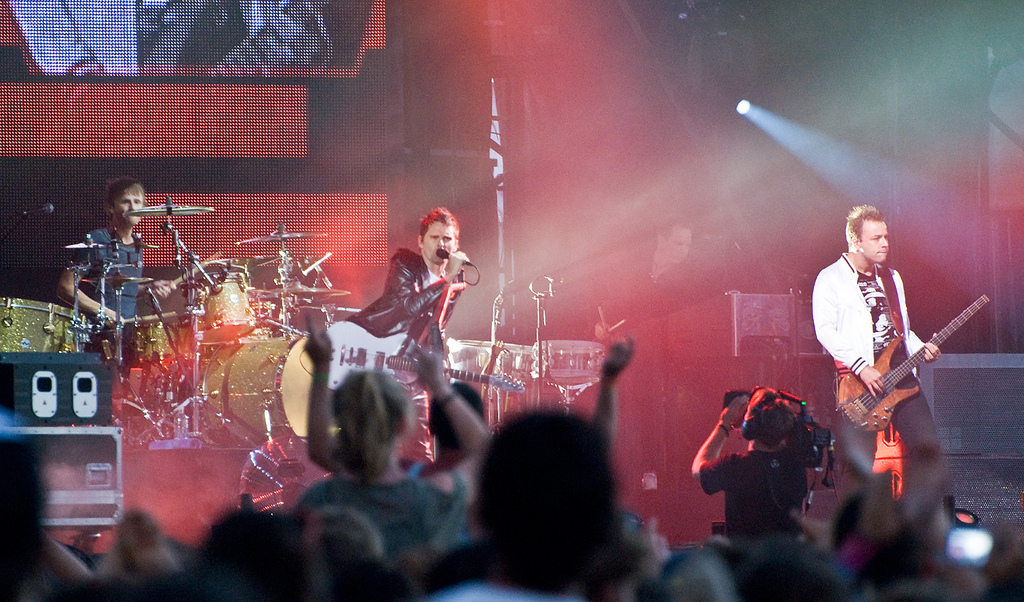
Muse's second studio album Origin of Symmetry spent three consecutive weeks at number one.

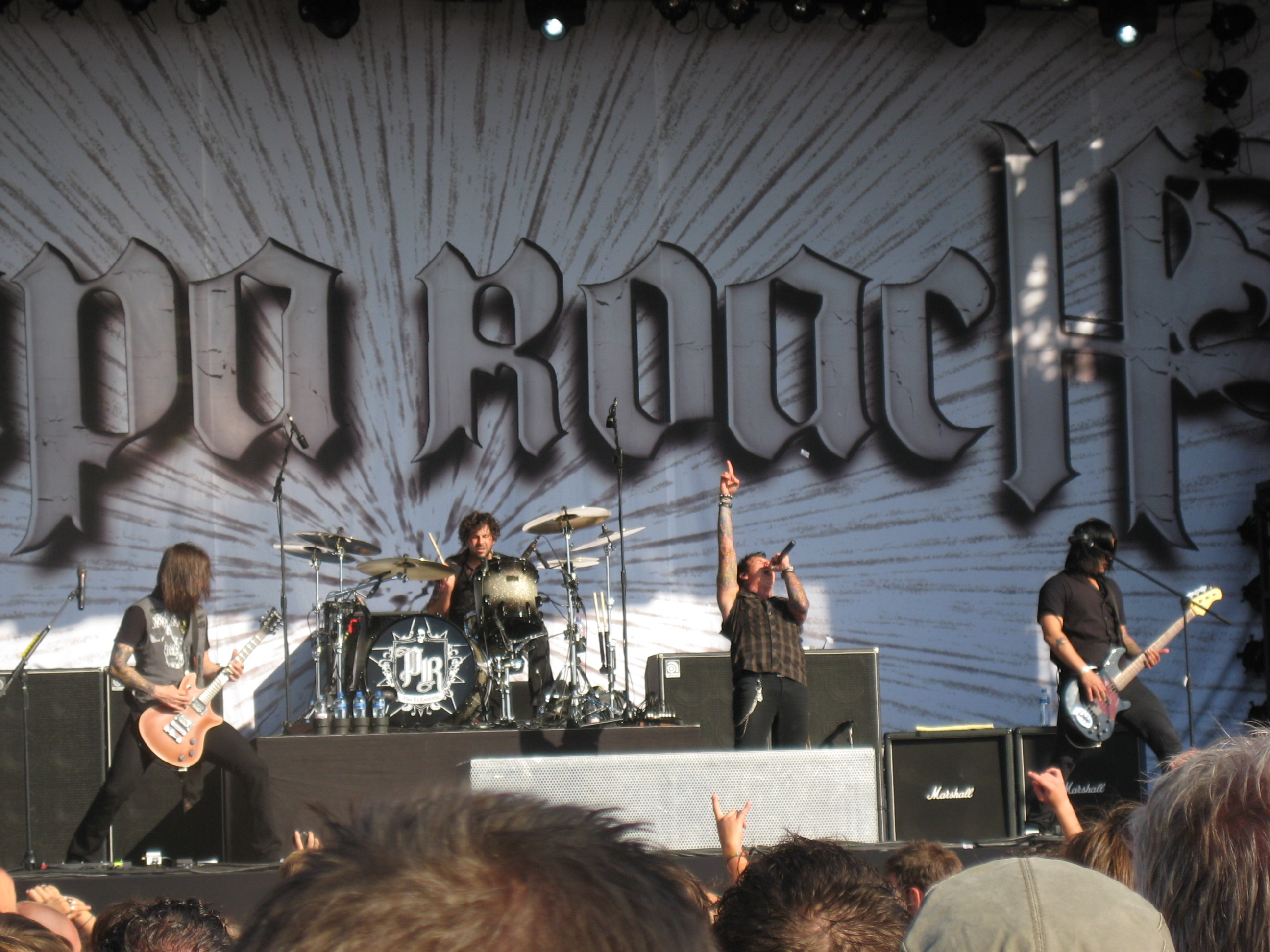
Papa Roach's second album Infest topped the chart for two weeks.

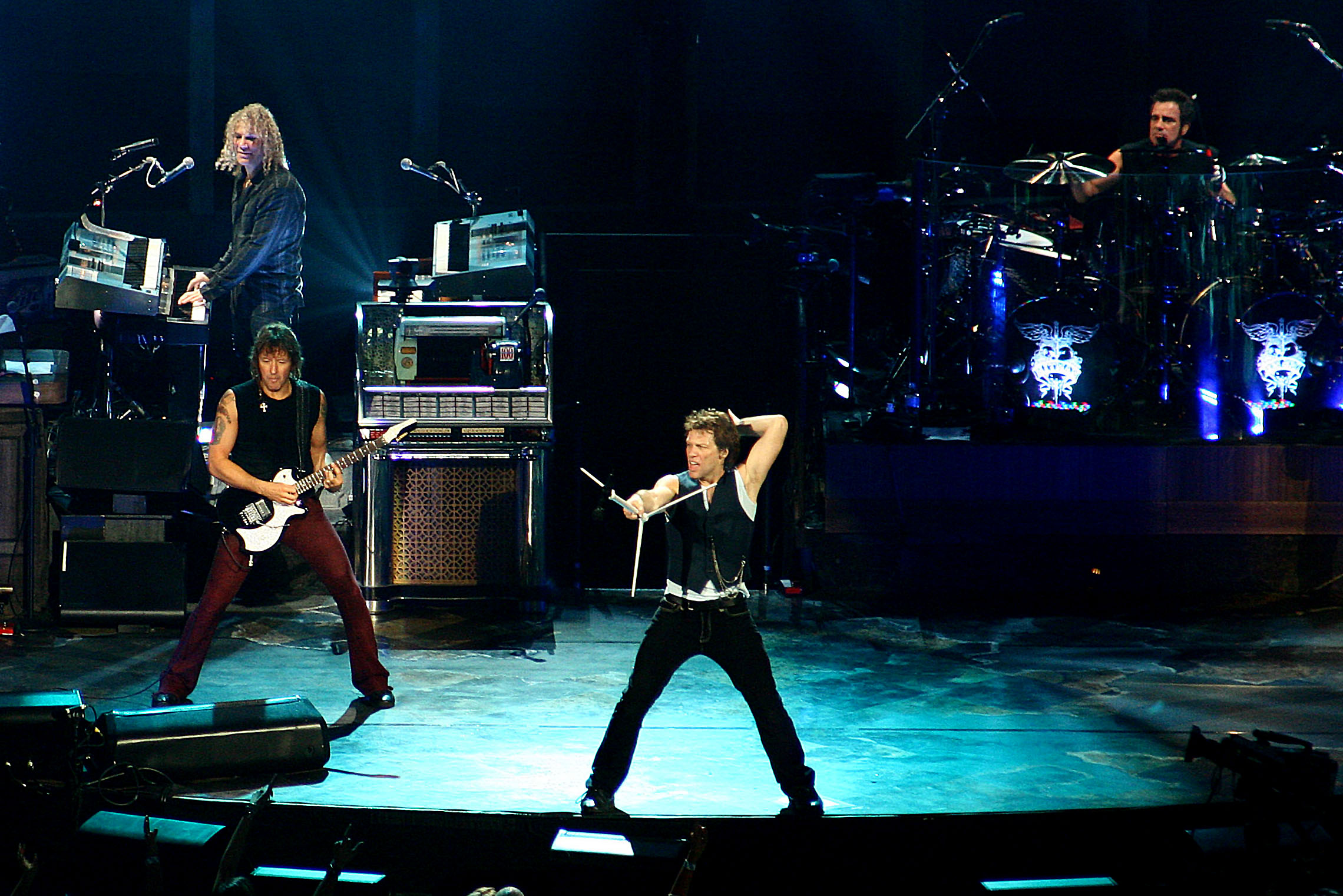
Bon Jovi's live album One Wild Night: Live 1985–2001 spent two weeks at number one on the chart.

Key
†	Indicates best-selling rock album of 2001

Issue date	Album	Artist(s)	Record label(s)	Ref.
6 January	Parachutes	Coldplay	Parlophone	
13 January	Parachutes	Coldplay	Parlophone	
20 January	Chocolate Starfish and the Hot Dog Flavored Water	Limp Bizkit	Interscope	
27 January	Chocolate Starfish and the Hot Dog Flavored Water	Limp Bizkit	Interscope	
3 February	Chocolate Starfish and the Hot Dog Flavored Water	Limp Bizkit	Interscope	
10 February	Chocolate Starfish and the Hot Dog Flavored Water	Limp Bizkit	Interscope	
17 February	Chocolate Starfish and the Hot Dog Flavored Water	Limp Bizkit	Interscope	
24 February	Infest	Papa Roach	DreamWorks	
3 March	Infest	Papa Roach	DreamWorks	
10 March	Parachutes	Coldplay	Parlophone	
17 March	Parachutes	Coldplay	Parlophone	
24 March	Just Push Play	Aerosmith	Columbia	
31 March	Parachutes	Coldplay	Parlophone	
7 April	Parachutes	Coldplay	Parlophone	
14 April	Hybrid Theory †	Linkin Park	Warner Bros.	
21 April	Hybrid Theory †	Linkin Park	Warner Bros.	
28 April	Hybrid Theory †	Linkin Park	Warner Bros.	
5 May	Hybrid Theory †	Linkin Park	Warner Bros.	
12 May	Hybrid Theory †	Linkin Park	Warner Bros.	
19 May	Hybrid Theory †	Linkin Park	Warner Bros.	
26 May	One Wild Night: Live 1985–2001	Bon Jovi	Mercury	
2 June	One Wild Night: Live 1985–2001	Bon Jovi	Mercury	
9 June	Hybrid Theory †	Linkin Park	Warner Bros.	
16 June	Hybrid Theory †	Linkin Park	Warner Bros.	
23 June	Take Off Your Pants and Jacket	Blink-182	MCA	
30 June	Origin of Symmetry	Muse	Mushroom	
7 July	Origin of Symmetry	Muse	Mushroom	
14 July	Origin of Symmetry	Muse	Mushroom	
21 July	Kerrang! The Album	Various artists	Universal Music TV	
28 July	Wheatus	Wheatus	Columbia	
4 August	Wheatus	Wheatus	Columbia	
11 August	Wheatus	Wheatus	Columbia	
18 August	Drops of Jupiter	Train	Columbia	
25 August	Drops of Jupiter	Train	Columbia	
1 September	Break the Cycle	Staind	East West	
8 September	Iowa	Slipknot	Roadrunner	
15 September	Break the Cycle	Staind	East West	
22 September	Break the Cycle	Staind	East West	
29 September	Break the Cycle	Staind	East West	
6 October	Never Mind the Bollocks, Here's the Sex Pistols	Sex Pistols	Virgin	
13 October	Hybrid Theory †	Linkin Park	Warner Bros.	
20 October	Hybrid Theory †	Linkin Park	Warner Bros.	
27 October	Hybrid Theory †	Linkin Park	Warner Bros.	
3 November	Hybrid Theory †	Linkin Park	Warner Bros.	
10 November	Hybrid Theory †	Linkin Park	Warner Bros.	
17 November	Hybrid Theory †	Linkin Park	Warner Bros.	
24 November	International Superhits!	Green Day	Reprise	
1 December	Rotten Apples: The Greatest Hits	The Smashing Pumpkins	Hut	
8 December	Hybrid Theory †	Linkin Park	Warner Bros.	
15 December	Hybrid Theory †	Linkin Park	Warner Bros.	
22 December	Hybrid Theory †	Linkin Park	Warner Bros.	
29 December	Hybrid Theory †	Linkin Park	Warner Bros.	

== See also ==
- 2001 in British music
- List of UK Rock & Metal Singles Chart number ones of 2001
