= List of UK Rock & Metal Singles Chart number ones of 2001 =

The UK Rock & Metal Singles Chart is a record chart which ranks the best-selling rock and heavy metal songs in the United Kingdom. Compiled and published by the Official Charts Company, the data is based on each track's weekly physical sales, digital downloads and streams. In 2001, there were 16 singles that topped the 52 published charts. The first number-one single of the year was "Warning" by American pop punk band Green Day, the second single from the album of the same name, which spent the first two weeks of the year at number one. The final number-one single of the year was "In Too Deep", the second single from Canadian pop punk band Sum 41's debut album All Killer No Filler, which spent the last three weeks of the year (and the first four weeks of 2002) at number one.

The most successful song on the UK Rock & Metal Singles Chart in 2001 was "Butterfly" by Crazy Town, which spent eleven weeks at number one across two different spells. Alien Ant Farm's recording of Michael Jackson's "Smooth Criminal" spent eight weeks at number one, "Rollin'" by Limp Bizkit was number one for a total of seven weeks, and Train's "Drops of Jupiter (Tell Me)" spent five weeks atop the chart. Linkin Park spent four weeks at number one in 2001 with "Papercut", as well as an additional week atop the chart with "In the End". Sum 41's "In Too Deep" was number one for three weeks, while four singles – "Warning" by Green Day, "Jaded" by Aerosmith, "Million Miles Away" by The Offspring and "It's Been Awhile" by Staind – all spent two weeks at number one during the year.

== Chart history ==
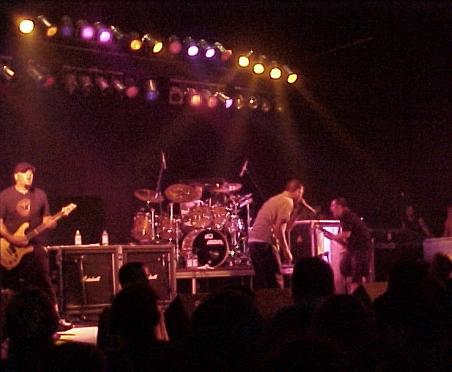
Alien Ant Farm's recording of Michael Jackson's "Smooth Criminal" spent eight weeks at number one.

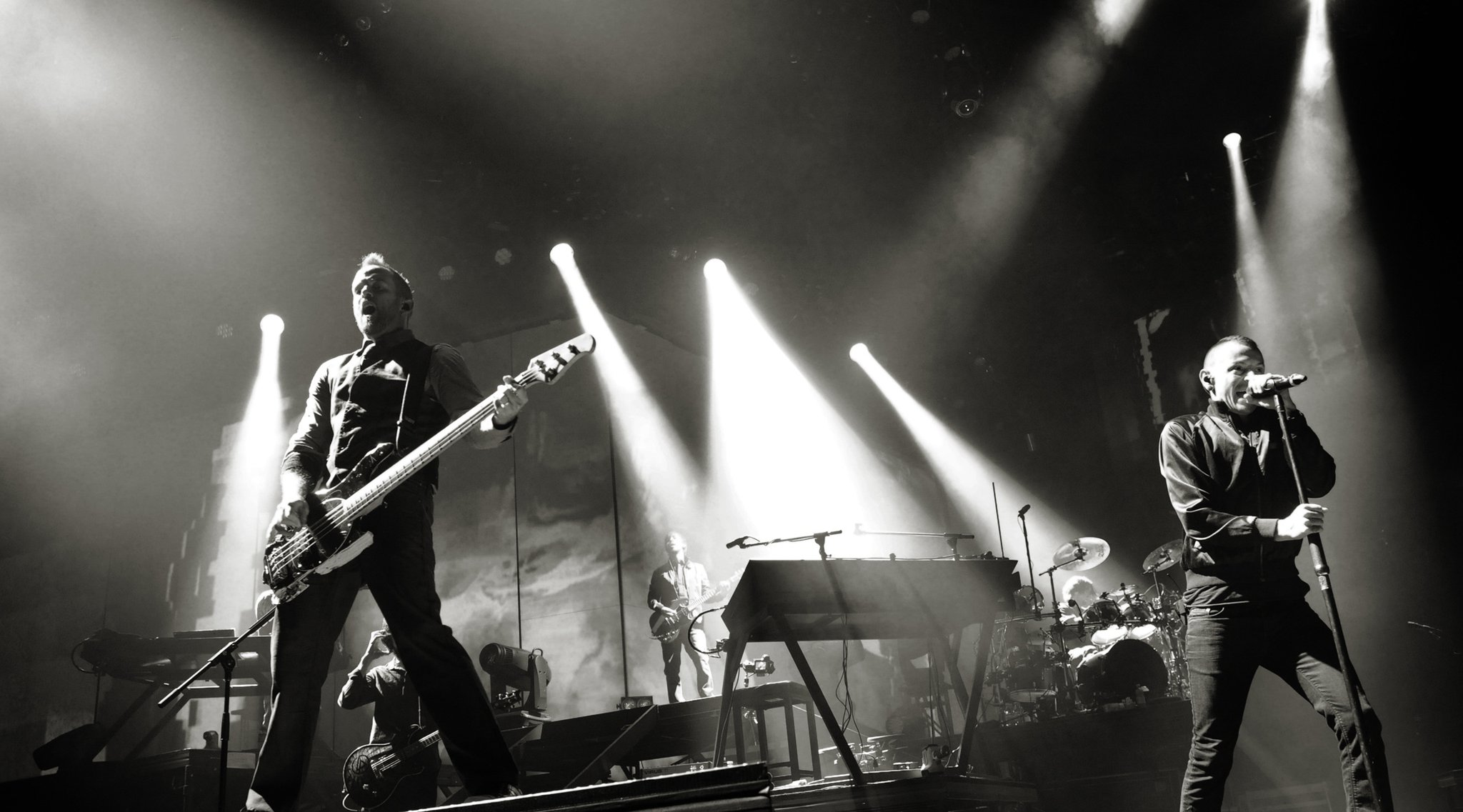
Linkin Park spent four weeks at number one with "Papercut", as well as one week with "In the End".

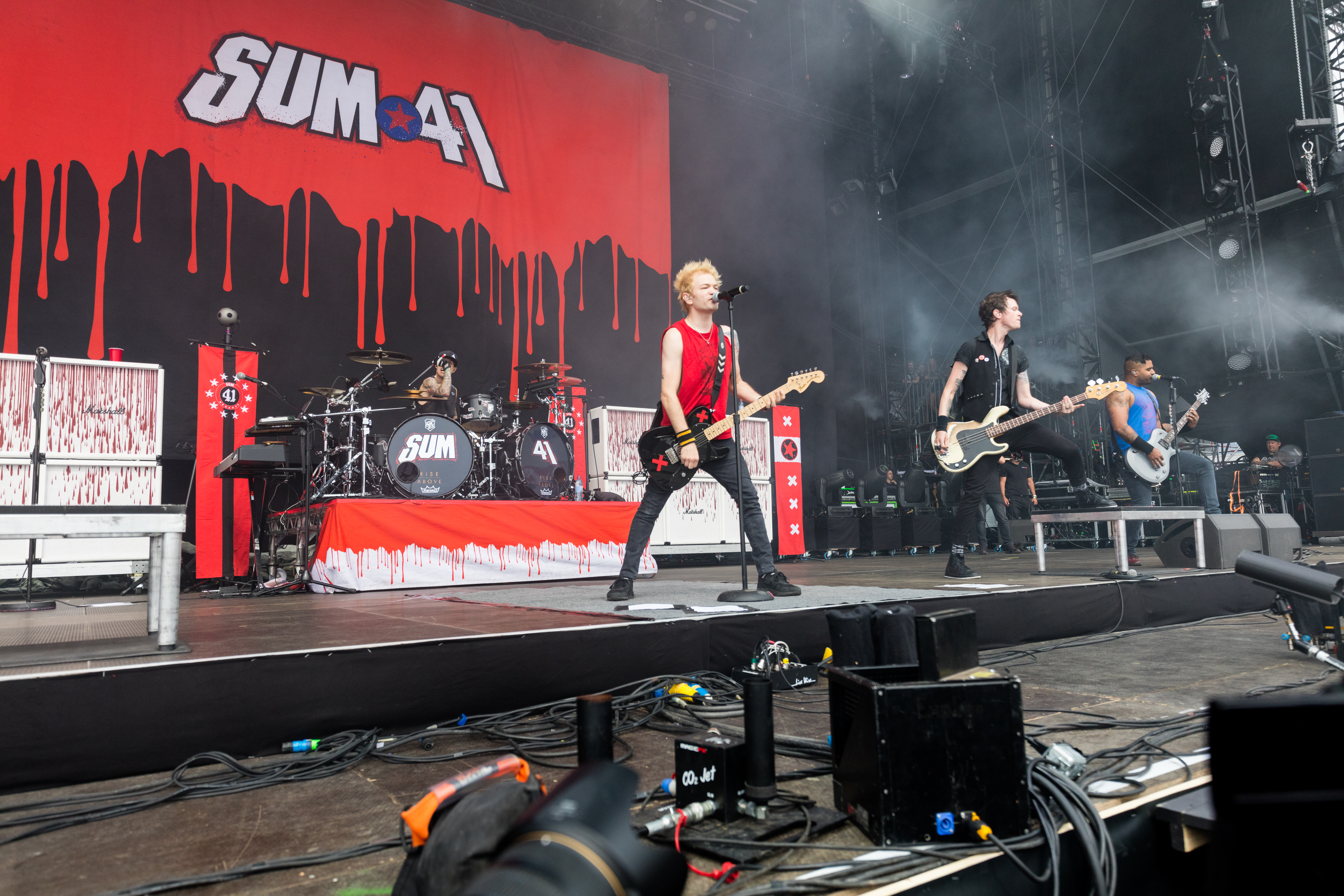
"In Too Deep" by Sum 41 spent the last three weeks of the year at number one.

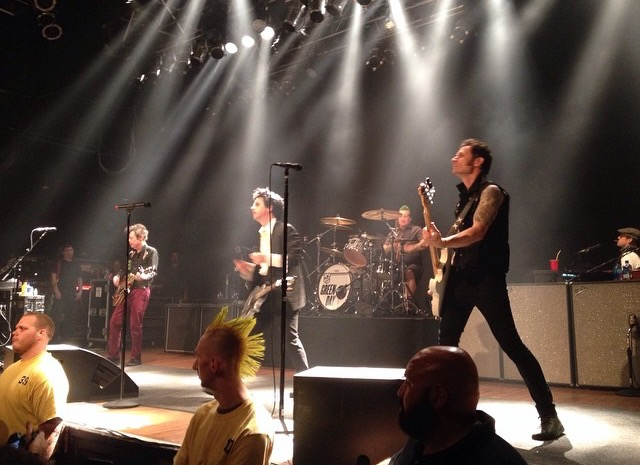
Green Day's "Warning" was number one for the first two weeks of 2001.

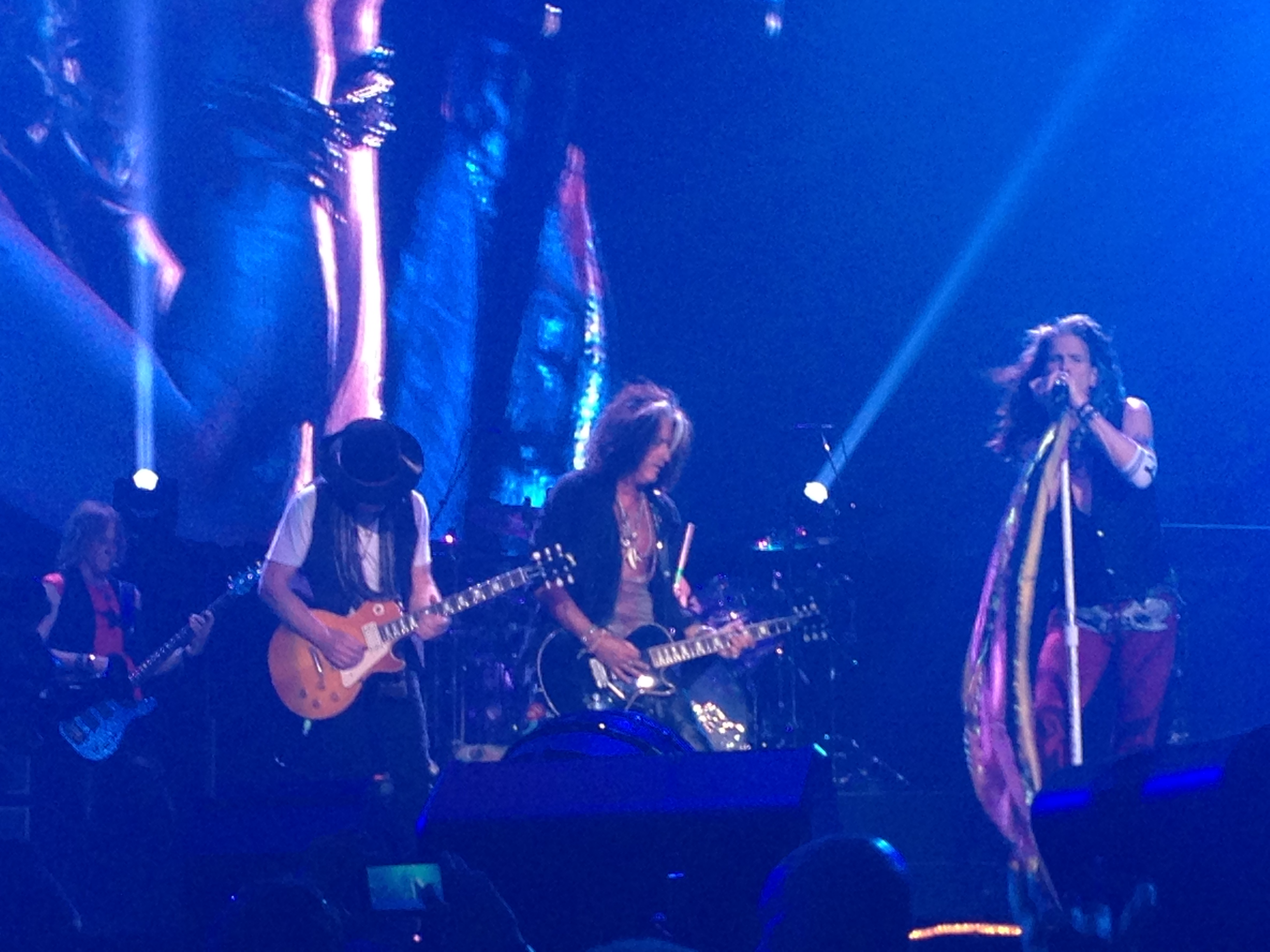
Aerosmith's "Jaded" spent two weeks at number one on the chart.

Issue date	Single	Artist(s)	Record label(s)	Ref.
6 January	"Warning"	Green Day	Reprise	
13 January	"Warning"	Green Day	Reprise	
20 January	"With Arms Wide Open"	Creed	Epic	
27 January ^{[a]} ^{[b]}	"Rollin'"	Limp Bizkit	Interscope	
3 February ^{[a]} ^{[b]}	"Rollin'"	Limp Bizkit	Interscope	
10 February ^{[b]}	"Rollin'"	Limp Bizkit	Interscope	
17 February	"Last Resort"	Papa Roach	DreamWorks	
24 February	"Rollin'"	Limp Bizkit	Interscope	
3 March	"Rollin'"	Limp Bizkit	Interscope	
10 March	"Rollin'"	Limp Bizkit	Interscope	
17 March	"Jaded"	Aerosmith	Columbia	
24 March ^{[b]}	"Jaded"	Aerosmith	Columbia	
31 March	"Rollin'"	Limp Bizkit	Interscope	
7 April	"Butterfly"	Crazy Town	Columbia	
14 April	"Butterfly"	Crazy Town	Columbia	
21 April	"Butterfly"	Crazy Town	Columbia	
28 April	"Butterfly"	Crazy Town	Columbia	
5 May	"Butterfly"	Crazy Town	Columbia	
12 May	"Butterfly"	Crazy Town	Columbia	
19 May	"One Wild Night"	Bon Jovi	Mercury	
26 May	"Butterfly"	Crazy Town	Columbia	
2 June	"Butterfly"	Crazy Town	Columbia	
9 June	"Butterfly"	Crazy Town	Columbia	
16 June	"Butterfly"	Crazy Town	Columbia	
23 June	"Butterfly"	Crazy Town	Columbia	
30 June	"Papercut"	Linkin Park	Warner Bros.	
7 July	"Million Miles Away"	The Offspring	Columbia	
14 July	"Million Miles Away"	The Offspring	Columbia	
21 July	"Papercut"	Linkin Park	Warner Bros.	
28 July	"Papercut"	Linkin Park	Warner Bros.	
4 August	"Papercut"	Linkin Park	Warner Bros.	
11 August	"Drops of Jupiter (Tell Me)"	Train	Columbia	
18 August ^{[b]}	"Drops of Jupiter (Tell Me)"	Train	Columbia	
25 August ^{[b]}	"Drops of Jupiter (Tell Me)"	Train	Columbia	
1 September	"Drops of Jupiter (Tell Me)"	Train	Columbia	
8 September	"Drops of Jupiter (Tell Me)"	Train	Columbia	
15 September ^{[b]}	"It's Been Awhile"	Staind	Elektra	
22 September ^{[b]}	"It's Been Awhile"	Staind	Elektra	
29 September	"Smooth Criminal"	Alien Ant Farm	DreamWorks	
6 October	"Smooth Criminal"	Alien Ant Farm	DreamWorks	
13 October	"Smooth Criminal"	Alien Ant Farm	DreamWorks	
20 October ^{[b]}	"In the End"	Linkin Park	Warner Bros.	
27 October	"Smooth Criminal"	Alien Ant Farm	DreamWorks	
3 November	"Smooth Criminal"	Alien Ant Farm	DreamWorks	
10 November	"Smooth Criminal"	Alien Ant Farm	DreamWorks	
17 November	"Smooth Criminal"	Alien Ant Farm	DreamWorks	
24 November	"Smooth Criminal"	Alien Ant Farm	DreamWorks	
1 December	"Hyper Music / Feeling Good"	Muse	Mushroom	
8 December	"Shinobi vs. Dragon Ninja"	Lostprophets	Visible Noise	
15 December	"In Too Deep"	Sum 41	Mercury	
22 December	"In Too Deep"	Sum 41	Mercury	
29 December	"In Too Deep"	Sum 41	Mercury	

== Notes ==
- ^{a} – The single was simultaneously number-one on the singles chart.
- ^{b} - The artist was simultaneously number one on the UK Rock & Metal Albums Chart.

== See also ==
- 2001 in British music
- List of UK Rock & Metal Albums Chart number ones of 2001
