= Thank You for Loving Me =

2000 single by Bon Jovi

- One of retail artworks

Single by Bon Jovi

from the album Crush
- Released: November 6, 2000
- Length: 5:09
- Label: Island; Mercury
- Songwriters: Jon Bon Jovi; Richie Sambora
- Producers: Jon Bon Jovi; Richie Sambora; Luke Ebbin

Bon Jovi singles chronology
"Say It Isn't So" (2000)	"Thank You for Loving Me" (2000)	"One Wild Night" (2001)

"Thank You for Loving Me" is a song by American rock band Bon Jovi. Written by Jon Bon Jovi and Richie Sambora, the song was released on November 6, 2000, as the third single (second in the United States) from their seventh studio album, Crush (2000).

== Background and writing ==
In an interview on Top of the Pops 2, Jon revealed the title of the song was inspired by actor Brad Pitt's character in the film Meet Joe Black.

== Chart performance ==
The song peaked at number 57 on the US Billboard Hot 100 and number 26 on the Mainstream Top 40 chart. It and also reached the top 40 in several other countries including the United Kingdom (number 12), Flanders (number 17), Germany (number 25), and Australia (number 34).

== Music video ==
The music video was directed by Wayne Isham was filmed in Rome, Italy, at the Trevi Fountain.

== Track listings ==
US 7-inch single

A. "Thank You for Loving You" – 5:07
B. "Bed of Roses" – 6:34

UK CD1

1. "Thank You for Loving Me"
2. "Captain Crash & the Beauty Queen from Mars" (live)
3. "Runaway" (live acoustic)

UK CD2

1. "Thank You for Loving Me"
2. "Just Older" (live)
3. "Born to Be My Baby" (live)

UK cassette single and European CD single

1. "Thank You for Loving Me"
2. "Captain Crash & the Beauty Queen from Mars" (live)

European maxi-CD single

1. "Thank You for Loving Me"
2. "Captain Crash & the Beauty Queen from Mars" (live)
3. "Runaway" (live acoustic)
4. "Just Older" (live)

Australasian maxi-CD single 1

1. "Thank You for Loving Me" (radio edit)
2. "Captain Crash & the Beauty Queen from Mars" (live)
3. "Born to Be My Baby" (live)
4. "I'll Be There for You" (live)
5. "I'll Sleep When I'm Dead" (live)

Australasian maxi-CD single 2

1. "Thank You for Loving Me" (radio edit)
2. "Rockin' in the Free World" (live)
3. "Just Older" (live)
4. "It's My Life" (live)
5. "Someday I'll Be Saturday Night" (live)

Japanese CD single

1. "Thank You for Loving Me" (radio edit)
2. "Born to Be My Baby" (live)
3. "I'll Be There for You" (live)
4. "I'll Sleep When I'm Dead" (live)

== Charts ==
=== Weekly charts ===
Chart (2000–2001)	Peak position
Australia (ARIA)	34
Austria (Ö3 Austria Top 40)	14
Belgium (Ultratop 50 Flanders)	17
Belgium (Ultratip Bubbling Under Wallonia)	6
Europe (Eurochart Hot 100)	21
Finland (Suomen virallinen lista)	19
Germany (GfK)	25
Ireland (IRMA)	19
Italy (FIMI)	14
Netherlands (Dutch Top 40)	19
Netherlands (Single Top 100)	24
Norway (VG-lista)	20
Portugal (AFP)	6
Scotland Singles (Official Charts)	15
Spain (Promusicae)	14
Sweden (Sverigetopplistan)	46
Switzerland (Schweizer Hitparade)	26
UK Singles (Official Charts)	12
UK Rock & Metal (Official Charts)	1
US Billboard Hot 100	57
US Adult Contemporary (Billboard)	15
US Adult Pop Airplay (Billboard)	22
US Pop Airplay (Billboard)	26

=== Year-end charts ===
Chart (2001)	Position
US Adult Contemporary (Billboard)	34
US Adult Top 40 (Billboard)	48
US Mainstream Top 40 (Billboard)	98

== Certifications ==
Region	Certification	Certified units/sales
Australia (ARIA)	Gold	35,000^{‡}
^{‡} Sales+streaming figures based on certification alone.

== Release history ==
Region	Date	Format(s)	Label(s)	Ref(s).
United States	November 6, 2000	Adult contemporary; hot adult contemporary; modern adult contemporary radio	Island	
United States	November 7, 2000	Contemporary hit radio	Island	
United Kingdom	November 27, 2000	CD; cassette	Mercury	
Canada	November 28, 2000	CD	Mercury	
Japan	December 27, 2000	CD	Mercury	
New Zealand	January 15, 2001	CD	Mercury	
