= One Wild Night Live 1985–2001 =

Live album by Bon Jovi
- Released: May 22, 2001
- Recorded: April 24, 1985; November 10, 1995 – January 2001
- Venue: various
- Length: 77:48
- Label: Island
- Producer: Obie O'Brien; Jon Bon Jovi; Richie Sambora; Luke Ebbin; Desmond Child

Bon Jovi chronology
Crush (2000)	One Wild Night Live 1985–2001 (2001)	Bounce (2002)

Singles from One Wild Night Live 1985–2001
- 1. "One Wild Night (2001)" Released: April 30, 2001; 2. "Wanted Dead or Alive (Live)" Released: July 2001

One Wild Night Live 1985–2001 is the first live album by the American rock band Bon Jovi, released on May 22, 2001. The album includes live covers of Neil Young's "Rockin' in the Free World" and performance of the Boomtown Rats' "I Don't Like Mondays", with a guest appearance by their lead singer Bob Geldof. The album charted at number 20 on the US Billboard 200 chart.

Professional ratings
Review scores
Source	Rating
AllMusic	link
Entertainment Weekly	B− link
Rolling Stone	(mixed) link
The Rolling Stone Album Guide	link

== Versions of songs ==
The duet of "I Don't Like Mondays" with Bob Geldof was performed at Wembley Stadium just two weeks short of the tenth anniversary of Live Aid, where Geldof performed the same song at the same stadium as part of the Boomtown Rats. He would later perform the same song almost exactly ten years later in London again at Live 8. This 1995 rendition of the song was previously released on a rare special edition 2-CD version of These Days. Several copies of the album misprint the year of the recording as 2000 however the actual year is 1995 when Bon Jovi performed at Wembley Stadium as part of the These Days tour. During the intro to the song, Jon Bon Bovi mistakenly welcomes Bob Geldof by saying to the crowd, "You should be proud to call him your own" despite Geldof being Irish, not English.

"One Wild Night 2001" is a new remix version rather than a live version. The difference between this version and the original Crush version is the length; the intro and other sections were cut out. This was released as a single for this album and featured a music video. The new version also features on the compilation album Tokyo Road: Best of Bon Jovi.

The live version of "Wanted Dead or Alive" was also released as a single and had a promotional video produced for it, this depicted live performances of the song and some backstage footage.

The three Zürich songs were recorded at the Letzigrund Stadium, and were also released on The Crush Tour DVD.

== Track listing ==
Standard edition
No.	Title	Writer(s)	Recorded	Length
1.	"It's My Life"	Jon Bon Jovi, Richie Sambora, Max Martin	Toronto, Ontario, Canada on November 27, 2000	3:50
2.	"Livin' on a Prayer"	Bon Jovi, Sambora, Desmond Child	Zürich, Switzerland on August 30, 2000	5:13
3.	"You Give Love a Bad Name"	Bon Jovi, Sambora, Child	Zürich, Switzerland on August 30, 2000	3:53
4.	"Keep the Faith"	Bon Jovi, Sambora, Child	New York City, United States on September 20, 2000	6:19
5.	"Someday I'll Be Saturday Night"	Bon Jovi, Sambora, Child	Melbourne, Australia on November 10, 1995	6:30
6.	"Rockin' in the Free World"	Neil Young	Johannesburg, South Africa on December 1, 1995	5:45
7.	"Something to Believe In"	Bon Jovi	Yokohama, Japan on May 19, 1996	6:00
8.	"Wanted Dead or Alive"	Bon Jovi, Sambora	New York City, New York on September 20, 2000	5:59
9.	"Runaway"	Bon Jovi, George Karak	Tokyo, Japan on April 28, 1985	4:47
10.	"In and Out of Love"	Bon Jovi	Tokyo, Japan on April 28, 1985	6:12
11.	"I Don't Like Mondays" (featuring Bob Geldof)	Bob Geldof	London, United Kingdom on June 25, 1995	5:37
12.	"Just Older"	Bon Jovi, Billy Falcon	Toronto, Ontario, Canada on November 27, 2000	5:13
13.	"Something for the Pain"	Bon Jovi, Sambora, Child	Melbourne, Australia on November 10, 1995	4:22
14.	"Bad Medicine"	Bon Jovi, Sambora, Child	Zürich, Switzerland on August 30, 2000	4:19
15.	"One Wild Night 2001"	Bon Jovi, Sambora, Child	January 2001 studio version	3:43

Australian exclusive collector's edition bonus disc
No.	Title	Writer(s)	Length
1.	"One Wild Night" (live in Melbourne, Australia on March 24, 2001)	Bon Jovi, Sambora, Child	4:05
2.	"It's My Life" (live in Melbourne, Australia on March 24, 2001)	Bon Jovi, Sambora, Martin	4:00
3.	"Livin' on a Prayer" (live in Melbourne, Australia on March 24, 2001)	Bon Jovi, Sambora, Child	6:09
4.	"Just Older" (live in Melbourne, Australia on March 24, 2001)	Bon Jovi, Falcon	5:11
5.	"I'll Sleep When I'm Dead" (live in Melbourne, Australia on March 24, 2001)	Bon Jovi, Sambora, Child	5:13

== Personnel ==
- Jon Bon Jovi – lead vocals, rhythm guitar
- Richie Sambora – harmony and backing vocals, lead and rhythm guitars
- David Bryan – keyboards, backing vocals
- Alec John Such – bass and backing vocals on "Runaway" and "In and Out of Love"
- Tico Torres – drums, percussion

Additional musicians

- Hugh McDonald – bass and backing vocals (except "Runaway" and "In and Out of Love")
- Bob Geldof – vocals on "I Don't Like Mondays"

== Charts ==
=== Weekly charts ===
Chart (2001)	Peak position
Australian Albums (ARIA)	6
Austrian Albums (Ö3 Austria)	2
Belgian Albums (Ultratop Flanders)	1
Belgian Albums (Ultratop Wallonia)	17
Canadian Albums (Billboard)	4
Danish Albums (Hitlisten)	10
Dutch Albums (Album Top 100)	2
Finnish Albums (Suomen virallinen lista)	4
French Albums (SNEP)	15
German Albums (Offizielle Top 100)	3
Hungarian Albums (MAHASZ)	7
Italian Albums (FIMI)	6
New Zealand Albums (RMNZ)	34
Norwegian Albums (VG-lista)	5
Scottish Albums (OCC)	2
Spanish Albums (AFYVE)	2
Swedish Albums (Sverigetopplistan)	7
Swiss Albums (Schweizer Hitparade)	1
UK Albums (OCC)	2
US Billboard 200	20

Chart (2005)	Peak position
Spanish Albums (Promusicae)	66

=== Year-end charts ===
Year-end chart performance for One Wild Night Live 1985–2001
Chart (2001)	Position
Austrian Albums (Ö3 Austria)	29
Belgian Albums (Ultratop Flanders)	16
Canadian Albums (Nielsen SoundScan)	137
Dutch Albums (Album Top 100)	26
German Albums (Offizielle Top 100)	25
Swiss Albums (Schweizer Hitparade)	14
UK Albums (OCC)	116

== Certifications ==
Region	Certification	Certified units/sales
Austria (IFPI Austria)	Gold	20,000^{*}
Brazil (Pro-Música Brasil)	Gold	50,000^{*}
Canada (Music Canada)	Gold	50,000^{^}
Germany (BVMI)	Gold	150,000^{^}
Spain (Promusicae)	Platinum	100,000^{^}
Switzerland (IFPI Switzerland)	Platinum	40,000^{^}
United Kingdom (BPI)	Silver	60,000^{^}
Summaries
Europe (IFPI)	Platinum	1,000,000^{*}
^{*} Sales figures based on certification alone.^{^} Shipments figures based on certification alone.
