= Say It Isn't So (Bon Jovi song) =

2000 single by Bon Jovi

Single by Bon Jovi

from the album Crush
- Released: July 21, 2000
- Length: 3:33
- Label: Mercury
- Songwriters: Jon Bon Jovi; Billy Falcon
- Producers: Luke Ebbin; Jon Bon Jovi; Richie Sambora

Bon Jovi singles chronology
"It's My Life" (2000)	"Say It Isn't So" (2000)	"Thank You for Loving Me" (2000)

"Say It Isn't So" is a song by American rock band Bon Jovi. It was released on July 21, 2000, as the second single from their seventh studio album, Crush (2000). David Bryan plays the solo of the song instead of Richie Sambora. Sambora performs vocals for this song along with Jon Bon Jovi.

== Music video ==
The music video was shot at Universal Studios Lot and directed by Wayne Isham that features car crash where Bon Jovi nearly crashed at the background, gladiators and chariot racing, Wild West, and cabaret dance. It features Claudia Schiffer, Arnold Schwarzenegger, Emilio Estevez, Ralf Möller, and Matt LeBlanc.

== Track listings ==
Australasian CD1

1. "Say It Isn't So"
2. "Ordinary People" (demo)
3. "Welcome to the Good Times" (demo)
4. "Livin' on a Prayer" (live at Wembley)
5. "Rome Worldwide Album Launch" (video)
6. "Bon Jovi Crush B Roll Footage" (video)

Australasian CD2

1. "Say It Isn't So"
2. "Ain't No Cure for Love" (demo)
3. "Stay" (demo)
4. "It's My Life"
5. "Keep the Faith" (live at Wembley—video)
6. "Bon Jovi Crush B Roll Footage" (Part 2—video)

Japanese CD single

1. "Say It Isn't So"
2. "Save the World"
3. "Livin' on a Prayer" (live)
4. "Keep the Faith" (live)

UK CD1

1. "Say It Isn't So" (UK mix)
2. "Ain't No Cure for Love" (demo)
3. "Stay" (demo)

UK CD2

1. "Say It Isn't So"
2. "Ordinary People" (demo)
3. "Welcome to the Good Times" (demo)

UK cassette single and European CD single

1. "Say It Isn't So"
2. "Ain't No Cure for Love" (demo)

European maxi-CD single

1. "Say It Isn't So"
2. "Ain't No Cure for Love" (demo)
3. "Stay" (demo)
4. "Keep the Faith" (live at Wembley)

== Charts ==
Chart (2000)	Peak position
Australia (ARIA)	9
Austria (Ö3 Austria Top 40)	22
Belgium (Ultratop 50 Flanders)	45
Belgium (Ultratip Bubbling Under Wallonia)	4
Croatia (HRT)	3
Europe (Eurochart Hot 100)	29
Germany (GfK)	35
Ireland (IRMA)	16
Italy (FIMI)	23
Netherlands (Dutch Top 40)	24
Netherlands (Single Top 100)	24
Scotland Singles (OCC)	9
Spain (PROMUSICAE)	13
Sweden (Sverigetopplistan)	35
Switzerland (Schweizer Hitparade)	58
UK Singles (OCC)	10

== Release history ==
Region	Date	Format(s)	Label(s)	Ref.
Europe	July 21, 2000	CD	Mercury	
United Kingdom	August 28, 2000	CD; cassette	Mercury	
Japan	September 27, 2000	CD	Mercury	
