= Bounce (Bon Jovi album) =

Studio album by Bon Jovi
- Released: October 8, 2002
- Recorded: March–June 2002
- Genres: Hard rock; heavy metal; pop rock
- Length: 49:10
- Labels: Island; Mercury
- Producers: Luke Ebbin; Jon Bon Jovi; Richie Sambora; Desmond Child; Andreas Carlsson

Bon Jovi chronology
One Wild Night Live 1985–2001 (2001)	Bounce (2002)	This Left Feels Right (2003)

Singles from Bounce
- 1. "Everyday" Released: August 19, 2002; 2. "Misunderstood" Released: November 13, 2002 (Note: In Japan, "Misunderstood" and "Bounce" were first released as a double A-side single on November 13, 2002.); 3. "Bounce" Released: November 13, 2002; 4. "The Distance" Released: February 19, 2003 (Japan only); 5. "All About Lovin' You" Released: May 12, 2003

Bounce is the eighth studio album by American rock band Bon Jovi, released on October 8, 2002, through Island Records. Produced by Luke Ebbin, Jon Bon Jovi and Richie Sambora, the album was recorded at Sanctuary II Studio in New Jersey.

Bounce was heavily influenced by the September 11 attacks, owing in part to Jon Bon Jovi's proximity to New York City. The title "Bounce" was a reference to New York City's and the United States' ability to bounce back from the World Trade Center attacks as a nation. Its cover art, a stylized image of a radio telescope dish at the Very Large Array, was photographed by Kevin Westenberg and produced by Kevin Reagan.

The album debuted at number two on the US Billboard 200, making it Bon Jovi's highest debut in the band's history at that time, although it became their first album not to reach platinum status in the US.

== Background ==
In end of July 2001, during the final tour One Wild Night Tour, Jon Bon Jovi confirmed for the Billboard that he started to write new songs for the Crush (2000) follow-up and that the entire band is planning to start recording from January 2002. He confirmed that band were planning to release the boxset in 2003, in conjunction with the band's 20th anniversary. Between June and October 2001, band members wrote 25 songs and demoed totally 12 of them. Many of those songs were written in September, and they were influenced by the September 11 attacks. Those songs were "Standing" and "Another Reason to Believe".

At the end of July 2001, Bon Jovi finished their Crush world tour with two sold-out shows at Giants Stadium in New Jersey. The band then took a three-week break after which Jon and Richie Sambora started writing songs, first in Los Angeles and later in New Jersey. They have demoed some of those new songs in New Jersey in November 2001. After that, Jon had to fulfill an acting commitment to the TV series Ally McBeal (1997–2002), so he stayed at Sambora's house in Los Angeles and during that time they continued with the songwriting process and demoing process at Luke Ebbin's house. Songwriting and demoing process went on until March 2002, and between March and June 2002, the album was recorded. By early July 2002. all the songs that ended up on the album were mixed and by the late July of the same year they were mastered. In a period of less than a year, the band wrote approximately 40 songs, 12 songs ended up on the album and several more songs in their demo versions ended up on singles as B-sides. During the songwriting process, the band wrote some songs that were written as a cathartic exercise. Those songs were written right after the September 11 attacks and they were mainly of woe from lyrical standpoint because they were influenced by that tragedy. Jon said that those songs were only written and will never be recorded.

== Lyrics and music ==
After a one-album absence, perennial Bon Jovi collaborator Desmond Child returned to co-write four of the album's 12 songs. The lyrics in the song "Undivided" were influenced by the September 11 attacks. It simply states that "no man is an island" and that all people are part of the greater world that is humanity, and that all people are stronger together than being apart. "Everyday" was influenced by the September 11 attacks. It reinforces the need to live each day to its fullest and the lyrics acknowledge the harshness of life, but encourage listeners to "brush themselves off", get back up on their feet and get on with life. "The Distance" is written in a cinematic style. The music serves as a score to the lyrics, which begins as an establishing shot and the "camera" draws closer into the story as the song progresses. The lyrics talk about the passion that a person feels when there is a goal in sight and displays the determination shown when that person is striving to reach that goal. "Joey" is influenced and inspired by Elton John's song Levon (1971) and talks about a character who befriends a simple-minded young man. "Misunderstood" is a song about anyone who has said the wrong thing and has had to face the consequences. The song was written after Jon Bon Jovi came home after long period of time and he realised there were portions of his personal life he had neglected and wrote this song to admit his guilt. "All About Lovin' You" is a love song that talks about appreciating the love of another. It was written in the aftermath of the events of September 11 and how many people rediscovered that love is the most important thing in life.

"Hook Me Up" is a song that was inspired by a newspaper article about a young Palestinian man in occupied territory who was trying desperately to make contact with people via an old, beat-up ham radio. It was written from the young man's perspective who was trapped in a small corner of the world, amidst horrible events when all he wanted was communication and a connection with the outside world and other people. "Right Side of Wrong" is a modern-day Butch Cassidy and the Sundance Kid song that talks about good people involved with the wrong people but have their hearts in the right place. "Love Me Back to Life" is about world-weariness and the need for someone or something that will breathe the life back into one and allow them to appreciate the world again. "You Had Me from Hello" is about a committed relationship and the ability for someone to constantly see something new and beautiful in the one they love. The title was taken from a phrase spoken by Cameron Crowe in his film Jerry Maguire (1996). The title track "Bounce" was originally written near the end of the One Wild Night Tour and had more sports-oriented lyrics. However, after the events of September 11, the song became a declaration of strength and defiance. It refers to the city of New York, and the United States as a whole, but also to the band's perseverance over a twenty-year career. "Open All Night" is written as a dialog between two characters in TV series Ally McBeal (1997–2002): Ally McBeal and Victor Morrison, a plumber and a babysitter portrayed by Jon Bon Jovi. Jon appeared in nine episodes as the character and the storyline involving Ally and Victor was romantic. Jon admitted that if that happened in real life, he would either never allow it to take so long or he would have moved on. .

== Critical reception ==
Professional ratings
Aggregate scores
Source	Rating
Metacritic	61/100
Review scores
Source	Rating
AllMusic	2/5 stars
Blender	3/5 stars
E!	C+
Entertainment Weekly	C
The Guardian	2/5 stars
Los Angeles Times	2/4 stars
Q	3/5 stars
Rolling Stone	3/5 stars

Bounce received generally mixed reviews from critics. At Metacritic, which assigns a normalized rating out of 100 to reviews from mainstream critics, the album has an average score of 61 out of 100, which indicates "favorable reviews" based on 8 reviews. Though, Stephen Thomas Erlewine from AllMusic gave the album 2 stars out of 5 stating that album "After all, this is a record where Bon Jovi seems to have consciously decided to avoid everything that gives their music character, melody, and muscle, a move that would have been odd at any point during their career, but is particularly puzzling after they delivered an album that found them growing old gracefully. It's as if they want to undo everything Crush did for them". David Browne from Entertainment Weekly rated the album with C stating that "Bon Jovi have every right to write and sing topical songs. But the results are sonically grating (the music feels shrill and compressed) and strained, reducing the emotions and situations connected to Sept. 11 to stadium chants". Natalie Nichols from Los Angeles Times gave the album 2 stars out of 4 stating that "This time the music's trademark epic quality comes less from Richie Sambora's sprawling guitar work than from an overdose of strings and piano that reflects singer-actor Jon Bon Jovi's movie and TV interests". Gavin Edwards from Rolling Stone gave the album 3 stars out of 5 by saying that "The title Bounce is meant to be an exhortation to America after 9/11, and if it doesn't exactly offer poetic catharsis, the existence of the eighth Bon Jovi record is reassurance of a different kind: Life goes on". Sputnikmusic gave the album 3.5 stars out of 5 saying that "Fueled by an emotional theme, Bon Jovi end up making their best album of the millennium era". Steven Poole from The Guardian gave the album 2 stars out of 5 saying that "for most of the record Jon Bon Jovi sounds puzzlingly like Elvis Costello or Elton John, and sugary ballads predominate, with Bruce Hornsby-like piano intros and tasteful acoustic-guitar lines leading to swollen, meaningless choruses".

== Track listing ==
No.	Title	Writer(s)	Length
1.	"Undivided"	Jon Bon Jovi; Richie Sambora; Billy Falcon	3:53
2.	"Everyday"	Bon Jovi; Sambora; Andreas Carlsson	3:00
3.	"The Distance"	Bon Jovi; Sambora; Desmond Child	4:48
4.	"Joey"	Bon Jovi; Sambora	4:54
5.	"Misunderstood"	Bon Jovi; Sambora; Child; Carlsson	3:30
6.	"All About Lovin' You"	Bon Jovi; Sambora; Child; Carlsson	3:46
7.	"Hook Me Up"	Bon Jovi; Sambora; Child; Carlsson	3:54
8.	"Right Side of Wrong"	Bon Jovi	5:50
9.	"Love Me Back to Life"	Bon Jovi; Sambora	4:09
10.	"You Had Me from Hello"	Bon Jovi; Sambora; Carlsson	3:49
11.	"Bounce"	Bon Jovi; Sambora; Falcon	3:11
12.	"Open All Night"	Bon Jovi; Sambora	4:22
Total length:			49:10

Japanese bonus tracks
No.	Title	Writer(s)	Length
13.	"No Regrets" (demo)	Bon Jovi	4:02
14.	"Postcards from the Wasteland" (demo)	Bon Jovi	4:25
Total length:			57:37

2010 special edition bonus tracks
No.	Title	Writer(s)	Length
13.	"The Distance" (live)	Bon Jovi; Sambora; Child	5:46
14.	"Joey" (live)	Bon Jovi; Sambora	5:26
15.	"Hook Me Up" (live)	Bon Jovi; Sambora; Child; Carlsson	4:46
16.	"Bounce" (live)	Bon Jovi; Sambora; Falcon	3:15
Total length:			68:23

== Personnel ==
Bon Jovi

- Jon Bon Jovi – lead and backing vocals
- Richie Sambora – guitars, talk box on "Everyday", "Love Me Back to Life" and "Bounce", backing vocals
- David Bryan – keyboards
- Tico Torres – drums, percussion
- Hugh McDonald – bass

Additional musicians

- Jerry Cohen – unspecified musical contribution
- Andreas Carlsson – unspecified musical contribution
- Samuel Waermo – unspecified musical contribution
- David Campbell – orchestral arrangements
- Luke Ebbin – orchestral arrangements

Recording personnel

- Luke Ebbin – producer, programming
- Jon Bon Jovi – producer
- Richie Sambora – producer
- Desmond Child – co-producer
- Andreas Carlsson – co-producer
- Obie O'Brien – engineer
- Mike Rew – assistant engineer
- Gary Tole – Pro-Tools, additional engineering
- Graham Hawthorne – Pro-Tools editor
- Efrain "ET" Torres – additional Pro-Tools engineering
- Samuel Waermo – additional engineering, programming
- Marc Jameson – programming ("You Had Me from Hello")
- Bob "Clear-Fuckin'" Mountain – mixing
- Kevin Harp – mix assistant
- Tim Holland – tech support
- Chris "Lumpy" Hofschneider – tech support
- George Marino – mastering (track 1, 2, 3, 5, 7, 10 & 11)
- Stephen Marcussen – mastering (track 4, 6, 8, 9 & 12)

Artwork

- Kevin Westenberg – photography
- Kevin Reagan – art direction, design
- Bret Healey – design

== Charts ==
=== Weekly charts ===
Weekly chart performance for Bounce by Bon Jovi
Chart (2002)	Peak position
Argentine Albums (CAPIF)	4
Australian Albums (ARIA)	5
Austrian Albums (Ö3 Austria)	3
Belgian Albums (Ultratop Flanders)	4
Belgian Albums (Ultratop Wallonia)	9
Canadian Albums (Billboard)	3
Danish Albums (Hitlisten)	19
Dutch Albums (Album Top 100)	2
European Albums (Billboard)	1
Finnish Albums (Suomen virallinen lista)	2
French Albums (SNEP)	8
German Albums (Offizielle Top 100)	2
Hungarian Albums (MAHASZ)	10
Irish Albums (IRMA)	5
Italian Albums (FIMI)	6
Japanese Albums (Oricon)	3
New Zealand Albums (RMNZ)	19
Norwegian Albums (VG-lista)	9
Scottish Albums (Official Charts)	2
Spanish Albums (PROMUSICAE)	2
Swedish Albums (Sverigetopplistan)	4
Swiss Albums (Schweizer Hitparade)	2
UK Albums (Official Charts)	2
US Billboard 200	2

=== Year-end charts ===
Year-end chart performance for Bounce by Bon Jovi
Chart (2002)	Position
Austrian Albums (Ö3 Austria)	28
Belgian Albums (Ultratop Flanders)	51
Canadian Albums (Nielsen SoundScan)	93
Canadian Metal Albums (Nielsen SoundScan)	13
Dutch Albums (Album Top 100)	62
Europe (European Top 100 Albums)	45
German Albums (Offizielle Top 100)	31
Japanese Albums (Oricon)	69
Swiss Albums (Schweizer Hitparade)	26
UK Albums (OCC)	113
Worldwide Albums (IFPI)	31

== Certifications ==
Certifications for Bounce by Bon Jovi
Region	Certification	Certified units/sales
Argentina (CAPIF)	Gold	20,000^{^}
Australia (ARIA)	Gold	35,000^{^}
Austria (IFPI Austria)	Gold	15,000^{*}
Belgium (BRMA)	Gold	25,000^{*}
Brazil (Pro-Música Brasil)	Gold	50,000^{*}
Canada (Music Canada)	Platinum	100,000^{^}
Germany (BVMI)	Platinum	300,000^{^}
Japan (RIAJ)	Platinum	319,000
Netherlands (NVPI)	Gold	40,000^{^}
Spain (Promusicae)	Gold	50,000^{^}
Switzerland (IFPI Switzerland)	Platinum	40,000^{^}
United Kingdom (BPI)	Gold	100,000^{^}
United States (RIAA)	Gold	500,000^{^}
Summaries
Europe (IFPI)	Platinum	1,000,000^{*}
^{*} Sales figures based on certification alone.^{^} Shipments figures based on certification alone.
