= Misunderstood (Bon Jovi song) =

2002 single by Bon Jovi

Single by Bon Jovi

from the album Bounce
- Released: November 13, 2002
- Length: 3:30 (album version); 3:45 (single remix)
- Label: Mercury; Island
- Songwriters: Jon Bon Jovi; Richie Sambora; Desmond Child; Andreas Carlsson
- Producers: Luke Ebbin; Jon Bon Jovi; Richie Sambora

Bon Jovi singles chronology
"Everyday" (2002)	"Misunderstood" (2002)	"Bounce" (2002)

Alternative cover

Music video
- "Misunderstood" on YouTube

"Misunderstood" is a song by American rock band Bon Jovi from their eighth studio album, Bounce. The single was first released in Japan as a double A-side with "Bounce" on November 13, 2002, and was released by itself in the United States the following month. "Misunderstood" peaked at No. 34 on the US Billboard Mainstream Top 40 chart and was nominated for a Grammy Award for Best Pop Performance by a Duo or Group with Vocal. The single is a version of the album cut that was remixed by Tim Palmer at Electric Lady Studios in New York.

== Music video ==
The video begins with a girl, Jill (played by Rachel Nichols), opening the door to her room where she and her boyfriend, Jack (played by Tom Sandoval), live. As she enters, she catches both Jack and another woman (played by Camila Alves) naked in bed. Shocked and embarrassed, Jack claims that it isn't what it looks like and begs her to let him explain. The video turns into a flashback and the music begins after an extended instrumental intro. The flashback shows Jack's far-fetched explanation with his dialogue displayed at the bottom of the screen interspersed with footage of Bon Jovi playing the song throughout. Here is Jack's dialogue:

"I was buying you flowers...I slipped and hit my head...I was unconscious...someone stole my wallet...I had amnesia...I wandered aimlessly...I found the pick-pocket...and chased him...into a bad situation! They put me in a box...and dumped me into the river! I floated for hours...finally I landed ashore...I just wanted to go home...but I was mistakenly arrested...and put behind bars. They finally caught the real crook...I ended up outside a secret club...I was front row at a Bon Jovi concert...and my memory came back! I was attacked by dogs...they ripped my clothes off...finally I made it to your bedroom...and just then an earthquake hit...and this girl fell through the ceiling!"

Then the video returns to the present and ends with Jack saying, "And that's exactly how it happened."

The uncut version of the video features different footage of Bon Jovi playing the song, as well as an extended beginning and ending which confirms that Jack was cheating on Jill. In the extended beginning, Jack can be heard moaning inside of Jill's room just as she opens the door. This is followed by alternate dialogue from Jill where after Jack tells her that it isn't what it looks like, she expresses her disbelief by asking him how it could possibly be anything else. This is then followed by additional footage where after Jack begs Jill to let him explain, she urges him to do so. Jack pauses for a moment, clearly unsure as to what he's going to say next which suggests that his following story is a complete fabrication. In the extended ending, after Jack finishes speaking, Jill produces a picture of him in their bed while engaged in a threesome with two other women. She asks him to explain that as well to which Jack nonchalantly says, "You know, there's an even better story for that."

NOTE: The instrumental intro was removed in the uncut version.

=== Summary ===
Original (Censored) Version
Uncut Version
Jill: Jack, what the hell is going on?
Jill: Jack, What the hell is going on in here?
Jack: It's not what it looks like
Jack: Baby, baby just wait. This is not what it looks like
Jill: There's a naked chick in your bed
Jill: Not what it looks like? How can it not be exactly what it looks like?
Jack: Just let me explain, okay. Just let me explain (the word "explain" then echoes)
Jack: Just let me explain, okay. Just let me explain

Jill: Explain it to me, Jack

The song plays as Jack tells his story
The song plays as Jack tells his story
Jack:...and that's exactly how it happened (Jack slightly sticks his tongue)
Jack: ...and that's exactly how it happened (Jack slightly sticks his tongue)
The music video ends
Jill: (Holds a picture of Jack engaged in a threesome) How do you explain this?

Jack: You know, there's an even better story for that (then the music video ends)

== Track listings ==
Canadian and European CD single

1. "Misunderstood" (single remix) (Jon Bon Jovi, Richie Sambora, Andreas Carlsson, Desmond Child)
2. "Everyday" (acoustic) (Jovi, Sambora, Carlsson)

Australasian CD single

1. "Misunderstood" (single remix) (Jovi, Sambora, Carlsson, Child) – 3:45
2. "Everyday" (acoustic) (Jovi, Sambora, Carlsson) – 2:47
3. "Undivided" (demo) (Jovi, Sambora, Billy Falcon) – 3:55
4. "Celluloid Heroes" (live featuring Ray Davies) (Davies)

European maxi-CD single

1. "Misunderstood" (single remix) (Jovi, Sambora, Carlsson, Child)
2. "Joey" (demo) (Jovi, Sambora)
3. "Right Side of Wrong" (demo) (Jovi)
4. "Misunderstood" (live) (Jovi, Sambora, Carlsson, Child)

UK CD1

1. "Misunderstood" (single remix) (Jovi, Sambora, Carlsson, Child) – 3:45
2. "Everyday" (acoustic) (Jovi, Sambora, Carlsson) – 2:47
3. "Undivided" (demo) (Jovi, Sambora, Falcon) – 3:55
4. "Misunderstood" (video)

UK CD2

1. "Misunderstood" (single remix) (Jovi, Sambora, Carlsson, Child)
2. "Celluloid Heroes" (live featuring Ray Davies) (Davies)
3. "Joey" (demo) (Jovi, Sambora)

== Charts ==
=== Weekly charts ===
Chart (2002–2003)	Peak position
Australia (ARIA)	33
Austria (Ö3 Austria Top 40)	37
Belgium (Ultratip Bubbling Under Flanders)	13
Canada (Nielsen SoundScan)	19
Europe (Eurochart Hot 100)	53
Germany (GfK)	35
Hungary (Single Top 40)	9
Ireland (IRMA)	37
Italy (FIMI)	32
Netherlands (Dutch Top 40)	35
Netherlands (Single Top 100)	27
Romania (Romanian Top 100)	90
Scotland Singles (OCC)	20
Spain (PROMUSICAE)	9
Sweden (Sverigetopplistan)	39
Switzerland (Schweizer Hitparade)	57
UK Singles (OCC)	21
US Bubbling Under Hot 100 (Billboard)	6
US Adult Pop Airplay (Billboard)	15
US Pop Airplay (Billboard)	34

=== Year-end charts ===
Chart (2003)	Position
US Adult Top 40 (Billboard)	36

== Certifications ==
Region	Certification	Certified units/sales
Brazil (Pro-Música Brasil)	Gold	30,000^{‡}
^{‡} Sales+streaming figures based on certification alone.

== Release history ==
Region	Version	Date	Format(s)	Label(s)	Ref.
Japan	"Bounce" / "Misunderstood"	November 13, 2002	CD	Mercury	
Australia	"Misunderstood"	December 2, 2002	CD	Island	
Belgium	"Misunderstood"	December 4, 2002	CD	Island	
New Zealand	"Misunderstood"	December 9, 2002	CD	Island	
United Kingdom	"Misunderstood"	December 9, 2002	CD; cassette	Mercury	
United States	"Misunderstood"	December 9, 2002	Hot adult contemporary radio	Island	
Canada	"Misunderstood"	January 14, 2003	CD	Island	
