= Everyday (Bon Jovi song) =

2002 single by Bon Jovi

Single by Bon Jovi

from the album Bounce
- Released: August 19, 2002
- Genre: Rock
- Length: 3:00
- Label: Island; Mercury
- Songwriters: Jon Bon Jovi; Richie Sambora; Andreas Carlsson
- Producers: Jon Bon Jovi; Richie Sambora; Andreas Carlsson

Bon Jovi singles chronology
"One Wild Night" (2001)	"Everyday" (2002)	"Misunderstood" (2002)

Music video
- "Everyday" on YouTube

"Everyday" is a song by American rock band Bon Jovi. It was released on August 19, 2002, as the lead single from the band's eighth studio album, Bounce (2002). The song was written and produced by Jon Bon Jovi, Richie Sambora and Andreas Carlsson. "Everyday" was nominated at the 2003 Grammy Awards for Best Pop Performance by a Duo or Group with Vocal.

== Background ==
Speaking in a video interview, Jon Bon Jovi claims, "We went after something that was a little more aggressive than (what) we had done before, but still had a big chorus, and had something to say". In reference to the song, Richie Sambora added, "Time is the most precious thing that you have, so you should try to live every moment to the fullest".

"Everyday" was later featured on the band's This Left Feels Right album in an acoustic style. In Asia, this song was used as the background for Mitsubishi TV adverts throughout 2002 and 2003.

== Commercial performance ==
"Everyday" peaked at No. 1 in Canada and Spain and reached the top 10 in several other countries, including the United Kingdom (No. 5), Australia (No. 5), Switzerland (No. 6), Sweden (No. 6), Italy (No. 7), and Germany (No. 7). In the United States, the song reached No. 36 on the Billboard Adult Top 40 chart and No. 31 on the Billboard Mainstream Rock Tracks chart.

== Music video ==
The music video shows the band performing in Socorro, New Mexico, by the VLA Radio Telescopes, one of the world's largest astronomical radio observatories. Meanwhile, different cities around the world are "hit" by numerous red TV boxes (Bon Jovi appears on the screens as the huge telescopes send out the signal all over the world). The people from these cities seem to be bored, but as soon they watch the TVs, they "start having fun".

Important scenes:

- At London, England, two punks chill out in front of the Big Ben.
- Wild savannah in Africa: tribe members jump a skip rope.
- Agra, India: youths skate aside the Taj Mahal.
- Havana, Cuba: a girl plays baseball with friends in the middle of the street.
- Moscow, Russia: TV boxes fall nearby the Saint Basil's Cathedral.
- New York City, USA: a girl walks and jumps through the window of a taxi at Times Square.
- Parkes radio telescope, Australia: Australian Aborigines dancing around a bonfire.
- Sarajevo, Bosnia and Herzegovina: people flies paper planes over a soccer stadium.
- Some border of Israel: a soldier guards the entrance of vehicles.
- Tokyo, Japan: Harajuku girls play with a hologram of a Pikachu-esque figure in a Tokyo street.
- Rome, Italy: a couple kisses in front the Colosseum.

== Track listings ==
CD1:

1. "Everyday" – 2:59
2. "Lucky" (demo) – 3:47
3. "No Regrets" (demo) – 4:02
4. "Standing" (demo) – 3:50

CD2:

1. "Everyday" 2:59
2. "Another Reason to Believe" (demo) – 3:30
3. "Breathe" (demo) – 3:40
4. "We Can Dance" (demo) – 4:45

== Charts ==
=== Weekly charts ===
Weekly chart performance for "Everyday"
Chart (2002)	Peak position
Australia (ARIA)	5
Austria (Ö3 Austria Top 40)	9
Belgium (Ultratop 50 Flanders)	22
Belgium (Ultratip Bubbling Under Wallonia)	8
Canada (Nielsen SoundScan)	1
Denmark (Tracklisten)	12
Europe (Eurochart Hot 100)	6
Finland (Suomen virallinen lista)	3
France (SNEP)	93
Germany (GfK)	7
Hungary (Mahasz)	9
Ireland (IRMA)	11
Italy (FIMI)	7
Japan (Oricon)	24
Netherlands (Dutch Top 40)	10
Netherlands (Single Top 100)	6
Portugal (AFP)	4
Romania (Romanian Top 100)	17
Scottish Singles Sales (Official Charts)	4
Spain (Promusicae)	1
Sweden (Sverigetopplistan)	6
Switzerland (Schweizer Hitparade)	6
UK Singles (Official Charts)	5
UK Rock & Metal (Official Charts)	1
US Bubbling Under Hot 100 (Billboard)	18
US Adult Pop Airplay (Billboard)	36
US Mainstream Rock (Billboard)	31
US Pop Airplay (Billboard)	38

=== Year-end charts ===
Year-end chart performance for "Everyday"
Chart (2002)	Position
Canada (Nielsen SoundScan)	24
Netherlands (Dutch Top 40)	75
Switzerland (Schweizer Hitparade)	79
Taiwan (Hito Radio)	27
UK Singles (OCC)	183

== Release history ==
Release dates and formats for "Everyday"
Region	Date	Format(s)	Label(s)	Ref.
United States	August 19, 2002	Contemporary hit; hot AC; mainstream rock; active rock radio	Island	
Japan	August 28, 2002	CD	Island	
Canada	September 3, 2002	CD	Island	
United Kingdom	September 16, 2002	CD	Mercury	
