= One Wild Night =

2001 single by Bon Jovi

Single by Bon Jovi

from the album One Wild Night Live 1985–2001
- Released: April 30, 2001
- Genre: Hard Rock
- Length: 3:43
- Label: Mercury
- Songwriters: Jon Bon Jovi; Richie Sambora
- Producers: Richie Sambora; Luke Ebbin; Desmond Child

Bon Jovi singles chronology
"Thank You For Loving Me" (2000)	"One Wild Night" (2001)	"Everyday" (2002)

Alternative cover

"One Wild Night" is a song by American rock band Bon Jovi. It was released on April 30, 2001, as a single from their 2001 live album, One Wild Night Live 1985–2001. It was written by Jon Bon Jovi and Richie Sambora, and produced by Sambora, Luke Ebbin and Desmond Child. The song became a chart hit in Europe, reaching the top 10 in seven countries.

== Release ==
The song was originally released on Crush but a new second version of the song appeared on their live album, One Wild Night Live 1985–2001, and the compilation album, Tokyo Road: Best of Bon Jovi and this version was released as a single and featured a music video.

== Charts ==
=== Weekly charts ===
Chart (2001)	Peak position
Australia (ARIA)	35
Austria (Ö3 Austria Top 40)	19
Belgium (Ultratop 50 Flanders)	37
Belgium (Ultratop 50 Wallonia)	15
Canada (Nielsen SoundScan)	33
Europe (Eurochart Hot 100)	25
Finland (Suomen virallinen lista)	10
Germany (GfK)	25
Ireland (IRMA)	21
Italy (FIMI)	10
Netherlands (Dutch Top 40)	8
Netherlands (Single Top 100)	17
Portugal (AFP)	6
Romania (Romanian Top 100)	7
Scottish Singles Sales (Official Charts)	9
Spain (Promusicae)	4
Sweden (Sverigetopplistan)	32
Switzerland (Schweizer Hitparade)	31
UK Singles (Official Charts)	10
UK Rock & Metal (Official Charts)	1

=== Year-end charts ===
Chart (2001)	Position
Romania (Romanian Top 100)	94

== Release history ==
Region	Date	Format(s)	Label(s)	Ref.
Australia	April 30, 2001	CD	Mercury	
United Kingdom	May 7, 2001	CD; cassette	Mercury	
