= 2001 in British music =

This is a summary of 2001 in music in the United Kingdom.

== Events ==
- 13 February – Peter Frampton receives the Orville H. Gibson Lifetime Achievement Award.
- 17 February – Manic Street Preachers become the first western rock band to play in Cuba. (Fidel Castro is in attendance.) They did not tour, meaning that an unsigned British rock band, Sandstone Veterans, remain the only band from the western world to tour Cuba.
- 8 March – Melanie C announces she does not intend to do any more work with the Spice Girls. Although the group denies it is splitting, it would not be active again until 2007.
- 26 March – Damon Albarn's project Gorillaz releases their eponymous debut studio album, which would sell over seven million copies worldwide by 2007, earning them an entry in the Guinness Book of World Records as the Most Successful Virtual Band.
- 28 March – Sergei Rachmaninoff's Piano Concerto No. 2 replaces Max Bruch's violin concerto at #1 in the Classic FM Hall of Fame.
- 4 April – Original Zombies lead singer Colin Blunstone and keyboardist Rod Argent reunite for a two-part performance at London's Jazz Cafe, the first time the two had performed together in over 30 years.
- 21 May – The first UK performance of Richard Rodney Bennett's Marimba Concerto takes place at the Fairfield Halls, Croydon. The US premiere was in 1988.
- 16 June – Romanian tenor Marius Brenciu becomes the first performer to win both the main prize and the song prize in the BBC Cardiff Singer of the World competition.
- 2 July – Liverpool Airport is rechristened Liverpool John Lennon Airport in an official ceremony.
- 3 September – Gorillaz withdraw from the nominations list for the Mercury Prize, stating that being nominated is "like carrying a dead albatross around your neck for eternity".
- 21 September – Welsh band Catatonia split up amicably, and after Cerys Matthews' treatment in rehab for alcohol and smoking problems.
- 1 November – The governing body of the UK Singles Chart, Chart Information Network Ltd. (CIN), changes its name to The Official UK Charts Company.
- 4 December – Promoters for So Solid Crew cancel their then planned tour – after a shooting at a gig at the London Astoria on 4 November, which saw two men hospitalised.
- 26 December – After denying rumours prior to their greatest hits album, pop group Steps shock their fans by announcing their split, a move that was heavily criticised by the fans. The group would reunite 10 years later.

== Classical music ==
=== Summary ===
Russell Watson came to the fore in 2001, with the release of his best-selling album The Voice. Another hit album was the score from Captain Corelli's Mandolin by Stephen Warbeck. Karl Jenkins "mass for peace", entitled The Armed Man, went quickly into the Classic FM top 300 annual chart, making him the highest-placed living composer.

=== Works ===
- Robat Arwyn – Atgof o'r Sêr
- Peter Maxwell Davies – Symphony No. 8 (Antarctic Symphony)
- Howard Goodall – In Memoriam Anne Frank
- Christopher Gunning – Piano Concerto
- John McCabe – Woman by the Sea (piano, string quartet)
- Stuart Mitchell – Seven Wonders Suite for Choir & Orchestra
- Hilary Tann – The Grey Tide and the Green

=== Opera ===
- Julian Wagstaff – John Paul Jones

=== Albums ===
- Karl Jenkins – Adiemus IV: The Eternal Knot
- Julian Lloyd Webber – Celebration
- Russell Watson – The Voice

== Musical films ==
- Strictly Sinatra, directed by Peter Capaldi, starring Ian Hart

== Film scores and incidental music ==
- John Barry – Enigma
- Patrick Doyle
  - Bridget Jones's Diary
  - Gosford Park
- John Powell
  - Evolution
  - Rat Race
  - I Am Sam
- Stephen Warbeck
  - Captain Corelli's Mandolin
  - Charlotte Gray

== Music awards ==
=== BRIT Awards ===
The 2001 BRIT Awards winners were:

- Best soundtrack: "American Beauty"
- British album: Coldplay – "Parachutes"
- British breakthrough act: a1
- British dance act: Fatboy Slim
- British female solo artist: Sonique
- British group: Coldplay
- British male solo artist: Robbie Williams
- British single: Robbie Williams – "Rock DJ"
- British video: Robbie Williams – "Rock DJ"
- International breakthrough act: Kelis
- International female: Madonna
- International group: U2
- International male: Eminem
- Outstanding contribution: U2
- Pop act: Westlife

=== Mercury Music Prize ===
The 2001 Mercury Music Prize was awarded to PJ Harvey – Stories from the City, Stories from the Sea.

=== Record of the Year ===
The Record of the Year was awarded to "Don't Stop Movin'" by S Club 7.

== Deaths ==
- 4 January – Lawrence Leonard, cellist, conductor and composer, 77
- 21 February – Ronnie Hilton, singer, 75
- 9 April – Ken Rattenbury, jazz trumpeter, pianist and composer, 80
- 11 April – Sir Harry Secombe, entertainer, 79
- 29 April – Rita Hunter, operatic soprano, 67
- 6 May – Mike Hazlewood, singer, composer and songwriter, 59 (heart attack)
- 21 May – Tony Ashton, keyboardist, singer and composer, 55 (cancer)
- 25 May – Delme Bryn-Jones, operatic baritone, 67
- 12 June – Thomas Wilson, composer, 83
- 19 June – Lindsay L. Cooper, musician, 61
- 3 July – Delia Derbyshire, electronic musician and composer, 64
- 12 July – James Bernard, film composer, 75
- 22 July – Emmanuel Fisher, conductor and composer, 79
- 24 October – Kim Gardner, musician, 53
- 16 November – Rosemary Brown, composer, pianist and spiritualist, 85
- 31 October – Bill Le Sage, jazz pianist, 74
- 28 November – Norman Lumsden, opera singer and actor, 95
- 29 November – George Harrison, singer, musician, music and film producer, 58
- 16 December – Stuart Adamson, guitarist with Big Country, 43 (suicide)
- 18 December – Clifford T. Ward, singer-songwriter, 57
