= Crush (Bon Jovi album) =

Studio album by Bon Jovi
- Released: May 29, 2000
- Recorded: 1999–2000
- Genre: Hard rock; pop rock
- Length: 57:52
- Label: Island; Mercury
- Producer: Jon Bon Jovi; Richie Sambora; Luke Ebbin

Bon Jovi chronology
These Days (1995)	Crush (2000)	One Wild Night Live 1985–2001 (2001)

Singles from Crush
- 1. "It's My Life" Released: May 8, 2000; 2. "Say It Isn't So" Released: July 21, 2000; 3. "Thank You for Loving Me" Released: November 6, 2000

Crush is the seventh studio album by American rock band Bon Jovi. It was released on May 29, 2000, by Mercury Records in the UK and on June 13, 2000, by Island Records in the US. It was produced by Jon Bon Jovi, Richie Sambora, and Luke Ebbin. The album marks the longest timespan between studio albums for the band, with five years between the release of These Days (1995) and this album. After the initial plan to team up with producer Bruce Fairbairn fell through because of his death a year earlier, Bon Jovi and Sambora hired Luke Ebbin to update their sound.

Despite the long break, the album was just as successful as their previous releases and helped introduce the band to a new generation of fans. The success of the album was largely due to the lead single "It's My Life" which was nominated for a Grammy Award for Best Rock Performance by a Duo or Group with Vocal, while the album itself was nominated for Best Rock Album. Crush was certified double platinum in the United States by the Recording Industry Association of America.

== Background ==
The band took a hiatus after These Days (1995) during which Jon Bon Jovi and Richie Sambora released solo albums. In 1999, Jon Bon Jovi was planning to release a third solo album but the band started work on their new album in mid-1999. Its working title was Sex Sells. Posters using this title are seen in and around New York in the video for "Real Life" – the band's then most recent single. Another working title was One Wild Night. The latter was resurrected for a live compilation the following year.

An initial plan to team up with producers Bob Rock and Bruce Fairbairn fell through because of the latter's death. An audition process was set up, but the band was uninterested by the producers interviewed. Eventually Bon Jovi asked A&R executive John Kalodner if he knew up-and-coming producers, and he recommended Luke Ebbin. He was brought to Bon Jovi's home studio in New Jersey, and took a demo with only vocals and acoustic guitar to add programming, string and background vocal arrangements. On his return, Ebbin was hired.

The song "Next 100 Years" is a self cover. Jon Bon Jovi (with B'z's Koshi Inaba, who wrote the Japanese lyrics) sent a demo version to now extinct Japanese talent agency Johnny & Associates. A special unit formed in 1997, to raise funds for schools affected by the 1995 Great Hanshin earthquake, with the members of Tokio, V6 and KinKi Kids, called J-Friends, recorded the song in 1999. "J-FRIENDS Never Ending Spirit 1997-2003", a DVD with recordings of a year-end concert given in 2002 with several of the agency's groups, as well as past concerts by the special unit, released in April 2003, includes a live version of the song.

== Release and reception ==
Professional ratings
Review scores
Source	Rating
AllMusic	4/5 stars
Entertainment Weekly	B
Kerrang!	4/5 stars
Rolling Stone	3/5 stars

Crush debuted at number 9 on the Billboard 200 on the issue dated July 1, 2000, with 115,000 copies sold in contrast to their last set, These Days (1995), which debuted with 73,000 units, it stayed at number nine for a week before dropping to number 29 and spent 51 weeks on the chart. It was certified two times platinum by the RIAA, denoting shipments of two millions in the US. As of March 2009 the album has sold 2,071,000 copies in the United States according to Nielsen SoundScan. Crush debuted at No. 1 in the UK on June 10, 2000, and became the band's fifth consecutive UK No. 1 album, it stayed at the top of the chart for a week before dropping to number four, it remained on the chart for thirty nine weeks. It was certified platinum by the BPI on September 1, 2000, for shipments of 300,000 units. The album topped the European Top 100 Albums chart for seven weeks, spent fifteen weeks in the Top 10, and received double platinum certification by the IFPI Europe. The album was No. 6 on the 2000 Europe Year-End albums chart and No. 7 on the 2000 worldwide year end albums chart. The first single, "It's My Life", which included a music video, was the No. 3 best-selling single worldwide in 2000 and topped the European singles chart for 4 weeks. "Say It Isn't So" and "Thank You for Loving Me" were the other singles from the album utilising music videos.

Crush was mostly well received by critics. It was the first Bon Jovi album ever to be nominated for a Grammy. In a review for AllMusic, Steve Huey expressed the opinion that Crush was a "solidly crafted mainstream rock record that's much better than most might expect." Rolling Stone Magazine gave the album 3 stars out of 5 and described "It's My Life" as "a Britney track shot through the heart with Richie Sambora's voice-box guitar." Entertainment Weekly gave it a B and said that "if the Jersey rockers haven't matured much, it hardly matters. Crush — for all its sappy ballads and suburban pop fairy tales — is classic Bon Jovi. And that's not an oxymoron."

== Track listing ==
No.	Title	Writer(s)	Length
1.	"It's My Life"	Jon Bon Jovi; Richie Sambora; Max Martin	3:44
2.	"Say It Isn't So"	Bon Jovi; Billy Falcon	3:33
3.	"Thank You for Loving Me"	Bon Jovi; Sambora	5:09
4.	"Two Story Town"	Bon Jovi; Sambora; Dean Grakal; Mark Hudson	5:10
5.	"Next 100 Years"	Bon Jovi; Sambora; Bob Rock	6:19
6.	"Just Older"	Bon Jovi; Falcon	4:29
7.	"Mystery Train"	Bon Jovi; Falcon	5:14
8.	"Save the World"	Bon Jovi	5:31
9.	"Captain Crash & The Beauty Queen from Mars"	Bon Jovi; Sambora	4:31
10.	"She's a Mystery"	Bon Jovi; Peter Stuart; Greg Wells	5:18
11.	"I Got the Girl"	Bon Jovi	4:36
12.	"One Wild Night"	Bon Jovi; Sambora; Desmond Child	4:18

European bonus track
No.	Title	Writer(s)	Length
13.	"I Could Make a Living Out of Lovin' You"	Bon Jovi; Sambora; Falcon

Japanese bonus tracks
No.	Title	Writer(s)	Length
13.	"I Could Make a Living Out of Lovin' You"	Bon Jovi; Sambora; Falcon	4:40
14.	"Neurotica"	Bon Jovi; Sambora	4:45

Japanese Special Edition Bonus CD: Live from Osaka
No.	Title	Writer(s)	Length
1.	"Runaway" (Live, slow version)	Bon Jovi; George Karak	5:46
2.	"Mystery Train" (live)	Bon Jovi; Falcon	5:36
3.	"Rockin' in the Free World" (Neil Young cover; live)	Neil Young	5:50
4.	"Just Older" (Live)	Bon Jovi; Falcon	5:20
5.	"It's My Life" (Live)	Bon Jovi; Sambora; Martin	3:50
6.	"Someday I'll Be Saturday Night" (Live)	Bon Jovi; Sambora; Child	8:31

2010 Special Edition bonus tracks
No.	Title	Writer(s)	Length
13.	"It's My Life" (Live)	Bon Jovi; Sambora; Martin	3:57
14.	"Just Older" (Live)	Bon Jovi; Falcon	5:29
15.	"Captain Crash & the Beauty Queen From Mars" (Live)	Bon Jovi; Sambora	5:18

- At the end of the album, the band can be heard discussing what would happen if James Brown were there, which then follows 30 seconds of silence before a bonus track, "I Could Make a Living Out of Loving You".

== Personnel ==
Partial credits sourced from AllMusic.

Bon Jovi

- Jon Bon Jovi – lead vocals, producer
- Richie Sambora – guitars, talk box on "It's My Life", backing vocals, co-lead vocals on "Say It Isn't So", producer
- David Bryan – keyboards
- Tico Torres – drums, percussion

Additional musicians

- Hugh McDonald – bass
- Michael Dearchin – backing vocals
- David Campbell – string arrangements

Production staff

- Luke Ebbin – producer
- Joe Chiccarelli – engineer, recording
- Mike Rew – assistant engineer
- Bob Clearmountain – mixing
- Sheldon Steiger – Pro Tools
- Olaf Heine – photography
- George Marino – mastering
- Obie O'Brien – engineer
- Kevin Reagan – design

== Charts ==
=== Weekly charts ===
Weekly chart performance for Crush
Chart (2000)	Peak position
Argentinian Albums (CAPIF)	3
Australian Albums (ARIA)	1
Austrian Albums (Ö3 Austria)	1
Belgian Albums (Ultratop Flanders)	1
Belgian Albums (Ultratop Wallonia)	4
Canadian Albums (Billboard)	4
Danish Albums (Hitlisten)	3
Dutch Albums (Album Top 100)	1
European Albums (Music & Media)	1
Finnish Albums (Suomen virallinen lista)	1
French Albums (SNEP)	6
German Albums (Offizielle Top 100)	1
Hungarian Albums (MAHASZ)	3
Irish Albums (IRMA)	3
Italian Albums (FIMI)	1
Japanese Albums (Oricon)	2
New Zealand Albums (RMNZ)	23
Norwegian Albums (VG-lista)	4
Portuguese Albums (AFP)	3
Scottish Albums (Official Charts)	1
Singaporean Albums (SPVA)	1
Spanish Albums (AFYVE)	2
Swedish Albums (Sverigetopplistan)	2
Swiss Albums (Schweizer Hitparade)	1
UK Albums (Official Charts)	1
US Billboard 200	9

=== Year-end charts ===
2000 year-end chart performance for Crush by Bon Jovi
Chart (2000)	Position
Australian Albums (ARIA)	27
Austrian Albums (Ö3 Austria)	3
Belgian Albums (Ultratop Flanders)	6
Belgian Albums (Ultratop Wallonia)	31
Canadian Albums (Nielsen SoundScan)	44
Danish Albums (Hitlisten)	56
Dutch Albums (Album Top 100)	15
European Albums (Music & Media)	6
German Albums (Offizielle Top 100)	2
Japanese Albums (Oricon)	36
South Korean International Albums (MIAK)	18
Spanish Albums (AFYVE)	26
Swedish Albums (Sverigetopplistan)	48
Swiss Albums (Schweizer Hitparade)	2
UK Albums (OCC)	38
US Billboard 200	83

2001 year-end chart performance for Crush
Chart (2001)	Position
Canadian Albums (Nielsen SoundScan)	173
US Billboard 200	113

== Certifications ==
Certifications and sales for Crush
Region	Certification	Certified units/sales
Argentina (CAPIF)	Platinum	60,000^{^}
Australia (ARIA)	Platinum	70,000^{^}
Austria (IFPI Austria)	Platinum	50,000^{*}
Belgium (BRMA)	Platinum	50,000^{*}
Brazil (Pro-Música Brasil)	Gold	100,000^{*}
Canada (Music Canada)	2× Platinum	200,000^{^}
Czech Republic	Gold	25,000
Denmark (IFPI Danmark)	Gold	25,000^{^}
Finland (Musiikkituottajat)	Platinum	62,506
France (SNEP)	Gold	100,000^{*}
Germany (BVMI)	5× Gold	750,000^{^}
Hong Kong (IFPI Hong Kong)	3× Platinum	60,000^{*}
Hungary (MAHASZ)	Gold	5,000
India	Platinum	20,000
Indonesia	3× Platinum	150,000
Ireland (IRMA)	2× Platinum	30,000^{^}
Italy (FIMI)	2× Platinum	200,000^{*}
Japan (RIAJ)	3× Platinum	673,000
Malaysia	Platinum	25,000
Mexico (AMPROFON)	Platinum	150,000^{^}
Netherlands (NVPI)	2× Platinum	160,000^{^}
Norway (IFPI Norway)	Gold	25,000^{*}
Philippines (PARI)	Gold	20,000^{*}
Poland (ZPAV)	Gold	50,000^{*}
Portugal (AFP)	Gold	20,000^{^}
Singapore (RIAS)	Platinum	15,000^{*}
South Africa (RISA)	Platinum	50,000^{*}
South Korea (KMCA)	2× Platinum	60,000
Spain (Promusicae)	2× Platinum	200,000^{^}
Sweden (GLF)	Gold	40,000^{^}
Switzerland (IFPI Switzerland)	3× Platinum	150,000^{^}
Taiwan (RIT)	2× Platinum	100,000
Thailand	Platinum	40,000
Turkey (Mü-Yap)	Platinum	10,000^{*}
United Kingdom (BPI)	Platinum	300,000^{^}
United States (RIAA)	2× Platinum	2,071,000
Uruguay (CUD)	Gold	3,000^{^}
Venezuela	Gold	
Summaries
Europe (IFPI)	2× Platinum	2,000,000^{*}
^{*} Sales figures based on certification alone.^{^} Shipments figures based on certification alone.
