= It's My Life (Bon Jovi song) =

2000 single by Bon Jovi

- One of retail artworks

Single by Bon Jovi

from the album Crush
- B-side: "Next 100 Years"
- Released: May 8, 2000
- Genre: Pop rock; arena rock; alternative rock
- Length: 3:44
- Label: Island; Mercury
- Songwriters: Jon Bon Jovi; Richie Sambora; Max Martin
- Producers: Jon Bon Jovi; Richie Sambora; Luke Ebbin

Bon Jovi singles chronology
"Real Life" (1999)	"It's My Life" (2000)	"Say It Isn't So" (2000)

Music video
- "It’s My Life" on YouTube

"It's My Life" is a song by American rock band Bon Jovi. It was released on May 8, 2000, as the lead single from their seventh studio album, Crush (2000). It was written by Jon Bon Jovi, Richie Sambora, and Max Martin, and co-produced by Luke Ebbin. The song peaked at number one in Austria, Flanders, Italy, the Netherlands, Portugal, Romania, Spain, and Switzerland while charting within the top 10 across several other countries and peaking at number 33 on the US Billboard Hot 100. "It's My Life" is Bon Jovi's most successful single of the 2000s and their biggest hit since the 1980s.

== Background ==
"It's My Life" has many classic Bon Jovi features, such as Richie Sambora's use of the talk box, and a line in the second verse "For Tommy and Gina, who never backed down" refers to Tommy and Gina, a fictional working class couple that Bon Jovi and Sambora first wrote about in their 1986 single "Livin' on a Prayer".

The song also references fellow New Jersey singer Frank Sinatra: "My heart is like an open highway / Like Frankie said, I did it 'My Way'." Jon Bon Jovi and Richie Sambora apparently had a disagreement over those lines, with Bon Jovi recalling:

I had just come home from making U-571 and I said "Sinatra made 16 movies and toured till he was 80. This is my role model." He [Sambora] said, "You can't write that damn lyric. Nobody cares about Frank Sinatra but you." And I wrote it anyway.

In Paul Anka's cover of the song for his 2005 album Rock Swings, he sings the second line as "Frankie said he did it my way", since Anka wrote the English lyrics for "My Way".

== Reception ==
"Nobody had anticipated the song 'It's My Life'," noted Jon Bon Jovi in 2007. "Except us. We knew we had a hit." The song became an anthem that appealed to many fans. As Bon Jovi later stated: "I thought I was writing very self-indulgently about my own life and where I was in it. I didn't realize that the phrase 'It's My Life' would be taken as being about everyone – by teenagers, by older guys, mechanics, whatever. 'It's my life, and I'm taking control.' Everyone kind of feels that way from time to time."

Veteran critic Robert Christgau later hailed "It's My Life" as a "schlock-rock masterpiece" and "everyman anthem" with a lyric that is "all well-meaning Democrat-as-everyman Jon Bon Jovi".

== Music video ==
The music video was directed by Wayne Isham. Will Estes (as Tommy) and Shiri Appleby (as Gina) are the two main characters. At the beginning, Tommy is watching a video of a Bon Jovi concert on his computer when he is ordered by his mother to take out the trash. Suddenly, Gina calls and tells him to immediately come to the tunnel as the live concert has already started. Tommy starts running out of his apartment and obediently takes out the trash. He then runs through the streets of Los Angeles up to the concert, getting chased by dogs, taking pictures of Elvis impersonators, running a marathon and jackknifing a truck. The video was inspired by the film Run Lola Run. Jon Bon Jovi met Estes on the set of U-571 and chose him to be in the video. The music video features the 2nd Street Tunnel as one of the main settings.

It is the most viewed video by Bon Jovi on YouTube, reaching 1 billion views (the band's first song to do so) by the end of June 2021.

== Track listings ==
US 7-inch single

A. "It's My Life"
B. "Next 100 Years"

Australian maxi-CD single

1. "It's My Life"
2. "Hush" (demo version)
3. "You Can't Lose at Love" (demo)
4. "I Don't Want to Live Forever" (demo)
5. "Someday I'll Be Saturday Night" (enhanced video clip)
- Track five was recorded live by Tony Bongiovi at the Sanctuary II, New Jersey Web Concert on February 10, 2000

UK CD1

1. "It's My Life"
2. "Hush" (demo version)
3. "You Can't Lose at Love" (demo version)
- Includes poster

UK CD2

1. "It's My Life" (Dave Bascombe mix)
2. "Temptation" (demo version)
3. "I Don't Want to Live Forever" (demo version)
4. "It's My Life" (enhanced video)

European CD single

1. "It's My Life"
2. "Hush" (demo version)

European and Japanese maxi-CD single

1. "It's My Life"
2. "Hush" (demo version)
3. "You Can't Lose at Love" (demo version)
4. "Someday I'll Be Saturday Night" (live video)
- Track four was recorded live by Tony Bongiovi at the Sanctuary II, New Jersey Web Concert on February 10, 2000

== Acoustic version ==
A much slower, acoustic ballad version of the song is included on Bon Jovi's 2003 album This Left Feels Right, a collection of their greatest hits that were adapted into new formats. This version was released as a single. A live performance was uploaded to YouTube in May 2020.

== Awards ==
Won:

- Video of the Year at the VH1 My Music Awards
- Chosen as one of the greatest songs of the year at the ASCAP Pop Music Awards

Nominated:

- Best Rock Performance by a Duo or Group with Vocal at the 43rd Annual Grammy Awards, losing to U2's "Beautiful Day"

== Charts ==
=== Weekly charts ===
Chart (2000)	Peak position
Australia (ARIA)	5
Austria (Ö3 Austria Top 40)	1
Belgium (Ultratop 50 Flanders)	1
Belgium (Ultratop 50 Wallonia)	6
Canada Top Singles (RPM)	20 (Note: "It's My Life" reached number 20 when RPM ceased publication in November 2000.)
Canada Adult Contemporary (RPM)	38 (Note: "It's My Life" reached number 38 when RPM ceased publication in November 2000.)
Canada Rock/Alternative (RPM)	11 (Note: "It's My Life" reached number 11 when RPM ceased publication in November 2000.)
Croatia International Airplay (Top lista)	1
Denmark (IFPI)	2
Europe (Eurochart Hot 100)	1
Finland (Suomen virallinen lista)	6
France (SNEP)	14
Germany (GfK)	2
Greece (IFPI)	3
Hungary (Mahasz)	5
Iceland (Íslenski Listinn Topp 40)	2
Ireland (IRMA)	5
Italy (FIMI)	1
Italy Airplay (Music & Media)	1
Japan (Oricon)	21
Netherlands (Dutch Top 40)	1
Netherlands (Single Top 100)	1
Norway (VG-lista)	3
Poland Airplay (Music & Media)	9
Portugal (AFP)	1
Romania (Romanian Top 100)	1
Scottish Singles Sales (Official Charts)	3
Spain (Promusicae)	1
Sweden (Sverigetopplistan)	2
Switzerland (Schweizer Hitparade)	1
UK Singles (Official Charts)	3
US Billboard Hot 100	33
US Adult Pop Airplay (Billboard)	11
US Pop Airplay (Billboard)	14

Chart (2011)	Peak position
Hungary (Single Top 40)	6

Chart (2022–2025)	Peak position
Bulgaria Airplay (PROPHON)	2
Moldova Airplay (TopHit)	56
Poland (Polish Airplay Top 100)	54
Romania Airplay (TopHit)	92
Ukraine Airplay (TopHit)	78

=== Year-end charts ===
Chart (2000)	Position
Australia (ARIA)	24
Austria (Ö3 Austria Top 40)	2
Belgium (Ultratop 50 Flanders)	8
Belgium (Ultratop 50 Wallonia)	19
Denmark (IFPI)	23
Europe (Eurochart Hot 100)	5
France (SNEP)	60
Germany (Media Control)	5
Iceland (Íslenski Listinn Topp 40)	58
Ireland (IRMA)	23
Italy (Musica e dischi)	1
Netherlands (Dutch Top 40)	17
Netherlands (Single Top 100)	12
Romania (Romanian Top 100)	4
Spain (AFYVE)	9
Sweden (Hitlistan)	5
Switzerland (Schweizer Hitparade)	3
Taiwan (Hito Radio)	5
UK Singles (OCC)	52
US Adult Top 40 (Billboard)	45
US Mainstream Top 40 (Billboard)	46

Chart (2001)	Position
US Adult Top 40 (Billboard)	85

=== Decade-end charts ===
Chart (2000–2009)	Position
Germany (Media Control GfK)	53
Netherlands (Single Top 100)	62

== Certifications ==
Region	Certification	Certified units/sales
Australia (ARIA)	6× Platinum	420,000^{‡}
Austria (IFPI Austria)	Platinum	50,000^{*}
Belgium (BRMA)	Platinum	50,000^{*}
Brazil (Pro-Música Brasil)	Gold	30,000^{‡}
Denmark (IFPI Danmark)	Platinum	90,000^{‡}
France (SNEP)	Gold	250,000^{*}
Germany (BVMI)	Platinum	500,000^{^}
Italy (FIMI)	Platinum	50,000^{‡}
Japan (RIAJ) PC download	Gold	100,000^{*}
Japan (RIAJ) Full-length ringtone	Gold	100,000^{*}
Netherlands (NVPI)	Gold	40,000^{^}
New Zealand (RMNZ)	3× Platinum	90,000^{‡}
Spain (Promusicae)	2× Platinum	120,000^{‡}
Sweden (GLF)	Platinum	30,000^{^}
Switzerland (IFPI Switzerland)	Platinum	50,000^{^}
United Kingdom (BPI)	2× Platinum	1,200,000^{‡}
United States (RIAA)	3× Platinum	3,000,000^{‡}
^{*} Sales figures based on certification alone.^{^} Shipments figures based on certification alone.^{‡} Sales+streaming figures based on certification alone.

== Release history ==
Region	Date	Format(s)	Label(s)	Ref.
United States	May 8, 2000	Hot adult contemporary radio	Island	
United States	May 9, 2000	Contemporary hit; mainstream rock; active rock radio	Island	
Japan	May 10, 2000	CD	Mercury	
United Kingdom	May 22, 2000	CD; cassette	Mercury	

== Pitbull version ==
"Now or Never"

Single by Pitbull with Bon Jovi

from the album Pitcoin
- Released: November 14, 2024
- Length: 2:28
- Label: Mr. 305 Inc.
- Songwriters: Jon Bon Jovi; Richie Sambora; Max Martin; Armando C. Pérez
- Producers: IAmChino; Jimmy Joker

Pitbull singles chronology
"2 the Moon" (2024)	"Now or Never" (2024)	"Tamo Bien" (2025)

Bon Jovi singles chronology
"Living Proof" (2024)	"Now or Never" (2024)	"Red, White and Jersey" (2025)

Music video
- "Now or Never" on YouTube

At the 25th Annual Latin Grammy Awards on November 14, 2024, rapper Pitbull performed a cover of "It's My Life" under the title "Now or Never", featuring Jon Bon Jovi on chorus. The song was released on streaming platforms on the same day.

The two artists first met at the 2017 Songwriters Hall of Fame. On September 12, 2024, during Pitbull's show at the Jones Beach Theater in Long Island, Jon Bon Jovi made a surprise appearance before the duo performed "It's My Life". After the show, Pitbull posted on his Instagram account: "Always an honor! To all the fans, get ready for our new collab coming soon."

The song hit number 36 on Billboard's Pop Airplay chart in 2025, becoming Bon Jovi's first song to appear on that chart since "Who Says You Can't Go Home" hit number 30 nearly 20 years prior.

=== Charts ===
==== Weekly charts ====
Weekly chart performance for "Now or Never"
Chart (2024–2025)	Peak position
Bolivia Anglo Airplay (Monitor Latino)	4
Costa Rica Anglo Airplay (Monitor Latino)	6
Estonia Airplay (TopHit)	91
France Airplay (SNEP)	15
Honduras Anglo Airplay (Monitor Latino)	1
Japan Hot Overseas (Billboard Japan)	11
Kazakhstan Airplay (TopHit)	83
Latvia Airplay (TopHit)	4
Lithuania Airplay (TopHit)	7
Mexico Anglo Airplay (Monitor Latino)	3
Puerto Rico Airplay (Monitor Latino)	17
US Adult Pop Airplay (Billboard)	11
US Pop Airplay (Billboard)	23

==== Monthly charts ====
Monthly chart performance for "Now or Never"
Chart (2024)	Peak position
Latvia Airplay (TopHit)	15
Lithuania Airplay (TopHit)	11

==== Year-end charts ====
Year-end chart performance for "Now or Never"
Chart (2025)	Position
Latvia Airplay (TopHit)	147
Lithuania Airplay (TopHit)	124
US Adult Pop Airplay (Billboard)	34

== See also ==
- List of number-one hits of 2000 (Austria)
- List of Dutch Top 40 number-one singles of 2000
- List of number-one hits of 2000 (Italy)
- List of number-one singles of 2000 (Spain)
- List of Romanian Top 100 number ones of the 2000s
- List of number-one singles of the 2000s (Switzerland)
