= Matt Nathanson discography =

This is the discography of American rock musician Matt Nathanson.

== Studio albums ==
Title	Details	Peak chart positions			
Title	Details	US	US Rock	US Heat	US Indie
Please	Release date: July 1993; Label: Acrobat Records; Formats: CD, cassette	—	—	—	—
Ernst	Release date: February 1997; Label: Acrobat Records; Formats: CD, cassette	—	—	—	—
Not Colored Too Perfect	Release date: April 1998; Label: Acrobat Records; Formats: CD, cassette	—	—	—	—
Still Waiting for Spring	Release date: March 1999; Label: Acrobat Records; Formats: CD, cassette	—	—	—	—
Beneath These Fireworks	Release date: October 14, 2003; Label: Universal/Acrobat Records; Formats: CD, music download	—	—	44	—
Some Mad Hope	Release date: August 14, 2007; Label: Vanguard Records; Formats: CD, Vinyl, music download	60	16	—	3
Modern Love	Release date: June 21, 2011; Label: Vanguard Records; Formats: CD, Vinyl, music download	17	4	—	4
Last of the Great Pretenders	Release date: July 16, 2013; Label: Vanguard Records; Formats: CD, Vinyl, music download	16	2	—	—
Show Me Your Fangs	Release date: October 2, 2015; Label: Vanguard Records; Formats: CD, Vinyl, music download	43	10	—	—
Sings His Sad Heart	Release date: October 5, 2018; Label: Acrobat Records; Formats: CD, vinyl, music download	59	—	—	—
Farewell December	Release date: October 23, 2020; Label: Acrobat Records; Formats: music download	—	—	—	—
Achtung Matty	Release date: November 18, 2021; Label: Acrobat Records; Formats: CD, vinyl, music download	—	—	—	—
Boston Accent	Release date: July 29, 2022; Label: Acrobat Records; Formats: CD, vinyl, music download	—	—	—	—
"—" denotes releases that did not chart

== Live albums ==
Title	Details	Peak chart positions	
Title	Details	US Heat	US Indie
At the Point	Release date: April 4, 2006; Label: Acrobat Records; Formats: CD, music download	29	28
Matt Nathanson: Live at Google	Release date: December 8, 2011; Label: Vanguard Records; Formats: Music download	—	—
Live in Paradise: Boston	Release date: July 24, 2020; Label: Acrobat Records; Formats: Music download, limited edition vinyl	—	—

== Extended plays ==
Title	Details	Peak positions
Title	Details	US
When Everything Meant Everything	Release date: November 2002; Label: Acrobat Records; Formats: CD, cassette	—
Plus	Release date: October 14, 2003; Label: Acrobat Records; Formats: CD, music download	—
iTunes: Live Session EP	Release date: 2009; Label: iTunes Store; Formats: Music download	185
Pyromattia	Release date: June 8, 2018; Label: Acrobat Records; Formats: Music download, limited edition vinyl	—
Postcards (from Chicago)	Release date: July 26, 2019; Label: Acrobat Records; Formats: Music download, limited edition vinyl	—
"—" denotes releases that did not chart

== Singles ==
Year	Single	Peak chart positions								Certifications (sales threshold)	Album
Year	Single	US	US AAA	US AC	US Adult	US Country	US Pop	US Rock	CAN	Certifications (sales threshold)	Album
2003	"Sad Songs"	—	—	—	—	—	—	—	—		Beneath These Fireworks
2004	"Suspended"	—	—	—	—	—	—	—	—		Beneath These Fireworks
2004	"I Saw"	—	—	—	—	—	—	—	—		Beneath These Fireworks
2007	"Car Crash"	—	13	—	30	—	—	—	—		Some Mad Hope
2008	"Come On Get Higher"	59	3	3	9	—	20	—	30	US: 2× Platinum; CAN: Gold	Some Mad Hope
2009	"All We Are"	—	26	—	—	—	—	—	—		Some Mad Hope
2009	"Falling Apart"	—	—	—	28	—	—	—	—		Some Mad Hope
2011	"Faster"	74	4	20	11	—	31	44	88	US: Gold	Modern Love
2011	"Room @ the End of the World"	—	17	—	—	—	—	—	—		Modern Love
2011	"Run" (featuring Sugarland)	53	—	—	17	60	—	—	—	US: Gold	Modern Love
2012	"Modern Love"	—	8	—	—	—	—	—	—		Modern Love
2013	"Mission Bells"	—	4	—	35	—	—	—	—		Last of the Great Pretenders
2013	"Kinks Shirt"	—	19	—	28	—	—	—	—		Last of the Great Pretenders
2014	"Headphones" (featuring Lolo)	—	—	26	23	—	—	—	—		Show Me Your Fangs
2015	"Gold in the Summertime"	—	—	—	39	—	—	—	—		Show Me Your Fangs
2015	"Giants"	—	—	—	—	—	—	—	—		Show Me Your Fangs
2015	"Adrenaline"	—	26	—	—	—	—	—	—		Show Me Your Fangs
2018	"Way Way Back"	—	—	—	17	—	—	—	—		Sings His Sad Heart
2018	"Used to Be"	—	—	—	17	—	—	—	—		Sings His Sad Heart
2019	"Christmas (Baby Please Come Home)"	—	—	2	—	—	—	—	—		Farewell December
2022	"German Cars"	—	—	—	—	—	—	—	—		Boston Accent
2022	"Boston Accent"	—	—	—	—	—	—	—	—		Boston Accent
"—" denotes releases that did not chart
