= Matt Fish (cellist) =

American cellist and a music producer

Matt Fish is an American cellist and a music producer.

== Early life and education ==
Fish was born in Lodi, California, and grew up in Dubuque, Iowa. He start playing piano at age five, and took up the cello at age nine. In high school Fish studied cello with George Work at Iowa State University and Charles Wendt at University of Iowa. He graduated from Indiana University School of Music, where he studied jazz with David Baker and classical cello with Helga Winold.

== Career ==
Fish moved to San Francisco and became a founding member of Combing Dolores, an acoustic jazz-folk trio. While in San Francisco, Fish recorded on the second album of singer/songwriter Matt Nathanson, Ernst.

In 2002 Fish began touring full-time with Matt Nathanson, and shortly after with Alejandro Escovedo.

Fish made television appearances on Austin City Limits, Jimmy Kimmel Live!, and the Craig Ferguson Show. He worked with producer John Cale, filmmaker Jonathan Demme, the band Earlimart, and singer k.d. lang.

In 2012, Fish continued to perform live shows with Nathanson.

Fish produced albums for David Hopkins, Justin Klump, and Supreme Fiction.

== Music ==
=== Recordings - cellist ===
- Conflict & Catalysis: Productions & Arrangements 1966-2006, John Cale
- M:FANS, John Cale
- Mercy, John Cale
- Recollection, k.d. lang
- Beneath These Fireworks, Matt Nathanson
- Still Waiting for Spring, Matt Nathanson
- Plus, Matt Nathanson
- When Everything Meant Everything, Matt Nathanson
- Not Colored Too Perfect, Matt Nathanson
- Ernst, Matt Nathanson
- The Boxing Mirror, Alejandro Escovedo
- Room of Songs, Alejandro Escovedo
- Melodia, The Vines
- There Are Debts (feat. Damien Rice), David Hopkins
- Hymn and Her, Earlimart
- Mentor Tormentor, Earlimart
- On Approach, Everest
- Break Through The Silence, Monty Are I
- Threadbare, Port O'Brien
- Let There Be Light FM, Light FM
- In Between, Highwater Rising
- November, Dead End Angels
- Hotel San Jose, Go Go Market
- Indoor Universe, Paula Frazer
- The Curse of the Songwriter, Pi
- Footprints in the Sky, Stefanie Gleit
- To Remember, Josh Kelley
- Stop Talking, Chris Price

=== Soundtracks - cellist ===
- American Wedding Soundtrack, Matt Nathanson cover of Laid (2003)
- November (directed by Greg Harrison, 2004)
- Jimmy Carter Man from Plains (directed by Jonathan Demme, 2007)
- When It's Dark (2009)
- Drifter: Henry Lee Lucas (2009)
- 30 Days of Night: Dark Days (2010)

=== Recordings - producer ===
- There Are Debts, David Hopkins (2010)
- Thousand Mile Dream, Justin Klump (2008)
- Supreme Fiction, self-titled EP (2008)
