= Show Me Your Fangs =

Studio album by Matt Nathanson
- Released: October 2, 2015
- Genres: Rock, pop, acoustic
- Length: 34:33
- Label: Vanguard
- Producers: Matt Nathanson with Mike Viola and Jake Sinclair

Matt Nathanson chronology
Last of the Great Pretenders (2013)	Show Me Your Fangs (2015)	Sings His Sad Heart (2018)

Show Me Your Fangs is the tenth studio album by American singer-songwriter Matt Nathanson. It was released on October 2, 2015. Show Me Your Fangs is Nathanson's fourth album for Vanguard Records, following his 2007 album Some Mad Hope, 2011 album Modern Love and 2013 album Last of the Great Pretenders. The first single, "Headphones", featuring Lolo was released in June 2014. For the video, Nathanson joined Starkey Hearing Technologies in Peru to help people with hearing loss. Following the release of "Headphones", Nathanson went on a two-month stateside co-headlining tour with his longtime friend Gavin DeGraw. In May 2015, the next single "Gold in the Summertime", was released and Nathanson headed out on a nationwide tour with Train and The Fray. The tour kicked off on May 21 at Sleep Train Amphitheatre at Sacramento in Marysville CA, with shows throughout the U.S. The tour wrapped up on July 25 at Gorge Amphitheatre in Quincy, Wash. "Giants", the third single off the newest album, was released in August, 2015. "Giants" was used as the theme song for the 2016 World Series of Poker on ESPN. The "Show Me Your Fangs Acoustic Tour - an evening with Matt Nathanson" kicked off September 21, 2015 at the Brighton Music Hall in Boston and ended in San Diego at the Casbah on October 30, 2015.

== Track listing ==
All tracks are written by Matt Nathanson except as noted.

No.	Title	Writer(s)	Length
1.	"Giants"	Nathanson, Andrew ”Knox” Brown, Jonny Coffer, Dennis Herring and Jerome Williams	3:49
2.	"Adrenaline"	Nathanson, Rob Kleiner and Aaron Tap	3:56
3.	"Gold in the Summertime"	Nathanson, Alex Suarez and Mike Viola	3:37
4.	"Bill Murray"	Nathanson, Dennis Herring and Amir Salem	3:28
5.	"Shouting"	Nathanson and Amir Salem	2:13
6.	"Show Me Your Fangs"	Nathanson, Amir Salem and Mike Viola	3:47
7.	"Disappear"	Nathanson and Dennis Herring	3:45
8.	"Washington State Fight Song"	Nathanson and Steve McEwen	3:06
9.	"Playlists & Apologies"	Nathanson, Rob Kleiner, Amir Salem and Aaron Tap	3:29
10.	"Headphones" (Featuring Lolo)	Nathanson, Amir Salem and Jake Sinclair	3:23

== Charts ==
Chart (2015)	Peak position
US Billboard 200	43
