= Heart of Me =

(The) Heart of Me may refer to:

- Heart of Me (album), by Tim Urban
- "Heart of Me" (song), a 2010 song by Tim Urban, from the album
- "The Heart of Me" (song), a 2016 song by Miike Snow
- The Heart of Me (film), a 2002 British period drama film
- The Heart of Me (album), a 2002 album by Kathy Troccoli
