= Islais Creek =

River in the United States of America

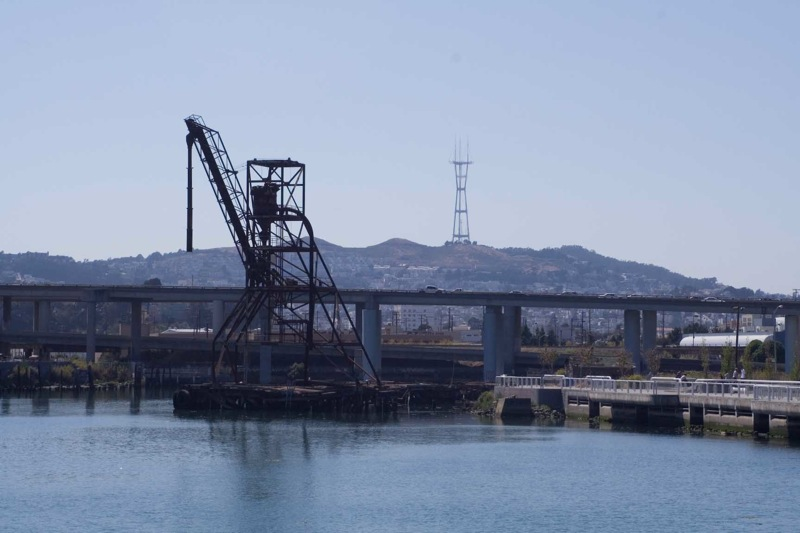
- Islais Creek with an abandoned five-story-high copra crane, Interstate 280 and Sutro Tower in the background
- Etymology: Los Islais, Spanish and slay or islay, Salinan (Native American) for Prunus ilicifolia wild cherries

Location
- Country: United States
- State: California
- Counties: City and County of San Francisco
- City: San Francisco

Physical characteristics
- Source: Cesar Chavez Street
  - location: Near Potrero Hill, City and County of San Francisco, California
  - coordinates: 37°44′51″N 122°23′16″W
  - elevation: 1 ft (0.30 m)
- Mouth: San Francisco Bay
  - location: Near Bayview-Hunters Point, City & County of San Francisco, California
  - coordinates: 37°44′54″N 122°22′32″W
  - elevation: −10 ft (−3.0 m)
- Length: 1 mi (1.6 km)

Islais Creek or Islais Creek Channel (previously known as Du Vrees Creek, Islais Channel and Islais Swamp) is a small creek in San Francisco, California. The name of the creek is derived from a Salinan Native American word "slay" or "islay", the name for the Prunus ilicifolia wild cherries. Around the time of the Gold Rush, the area became an industrial hub, and the condition of the creek worsened. After the devastating 1906 San Francisco earthquake, the city decided to reclaim the creek using earthquake debris, reducing the waterbody to its present size. Though much of Islais Creek has been converted to an underground culvert, remnants still exist today at both Glen Canyon Park and Third Street. Several community organizations are dedicated to preserve these remnants, as they are important wildlife habitats.

== Course ==
The historic Islais Creek, the largest body of water in the city covering an area of nearly 5,000 acres (7.813 sq mi; 20.234 km^{2}), had two main branches. One originated near the southern slope of Twin Peaks, slightly north of Portola Drive. It flowed downstream southeastward through the Glen Canyon Park paralleling Bosworth Street and eventually reaching the bottom of the Mission Street viaduct at I-280. The other branch began at the intersection of Cayuga Avenue and Regent Street. It flowed generally eastward along Mission Street and reached the I-280 viaduct. Together, as a wider creek, it ran parallel to Alemany Boulevard and I-280 and debouched into the Islais Creek estuary, near Industrial Street and Oakdale Avenue. Precita Creek, a nearby creek that originated from Noe Valley, also joined Islais Creek at the Cesar Chavez Street and Evans Avenue intersection.

From its sources in the Glen Canyon, the entire creek stretched about 3.5 miles (5.6 km) to the San Francisco Bay. The mouth was nearly 2 miles (3.2 km) wide, providing up to 85% of the drinking water in San Francisco. Due to urban development, however, the watershed of Islais Creek has been reduced by roughly 80% from its historical extent. A large number of neighborhoods in San Francisco today, such as Bernal Heights, Hunters Point, Visitacion Valley, parts of the Mission and Potrero Hill, were once covered by the extent of the creek.

In 2007, the San Francisco Public Utilities Commission, which manages the city's water, began investigating the possibility of "daylighting" underground portions of the creek. As of 2009, remnants of the creek remain inside the Glen Canyon Park and a 1-mile (1.6 km) channel near Third Street where Islais Creek debouched into the bay.

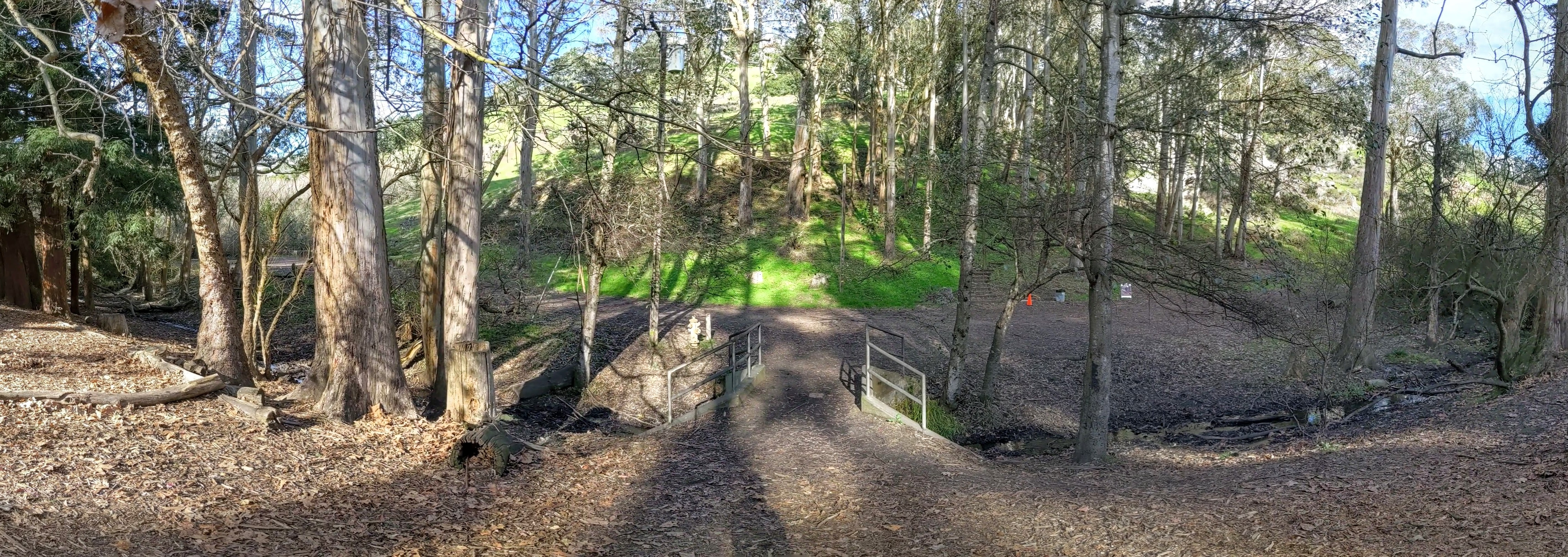
Upper Islais Creek in Glen Canyon Park, San Francisco

== History ==
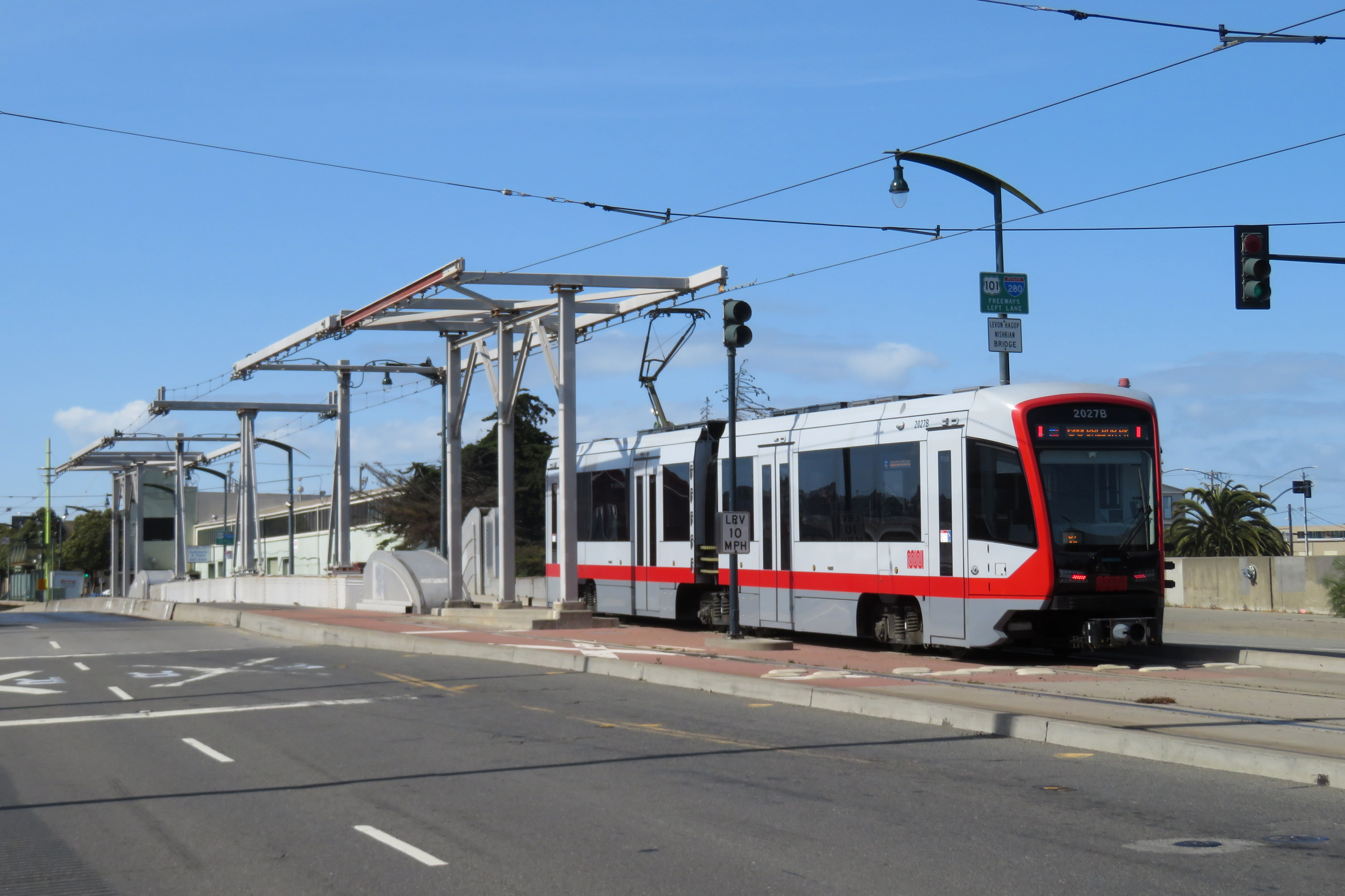
A T Third Street light rail train crossing the Islais Creek Bridge, a bascule-type drawbridge that carries 3rd Street over Islais Creek

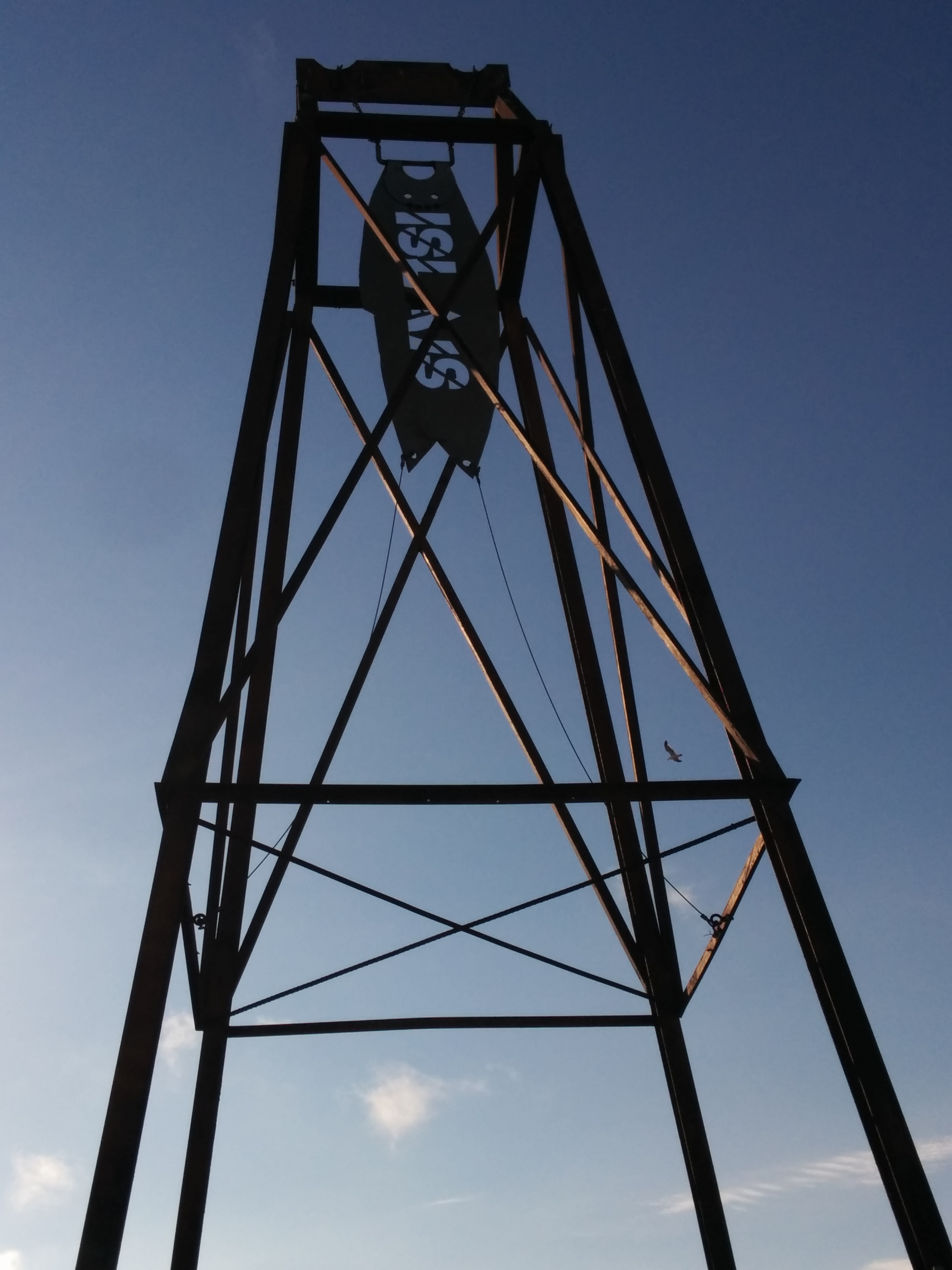
The creek's copra crane remnant in 2014, with an iron shape hanging in the center, with the word ISLAIS cut into it

The name Los Islais first appeared on Mexican maps in 1834, named for the Islay cherries that grew wildly in the area. By 1850, water from the creek was used by farmers to irrigate crops. The Gold Rush marked the decline of the creek as large numbers of gold rushers swarmed into the city.

A railroad trestle was built over the creek and tidal flats in the 1860s and in a lawsuit that went up to the California Supreme Court called The People of the State of California ex relatione The Board of State Harbor Commissioners v. The Potrero and Bay View Railroad Company, Islais Creek was declared a non-navigable waterway in 1883.

In 1871, the area along the creek became known as the city's "New Butchertown" when more than 100 slaughterhouses opened. Since then, the condition of the creek deteriorated, literally becoming a dumping place of garbage, sewage, animal waste, and unsold meat products. The condition became so bad that the creek was commonly referred to as "Shit Creek" by San Franciscans, according to historian Karl Kortum.

After the 1906 earthquake, San Francisco Board of Supervisors voted to fill the creek with earthquake debris, reducing the creek to its present size. During World War II, it served as docking areas for large ocean-going tugs. The area also located the largest copra coconut processing plant in the United States West Coast. In fact, the abandoned five-story high copra crane, used to transport large amount of copras from ships to the plant as late as 1974, still remains on the creek bank preserved as a historic landmark. In the 1950s, Islais Creek was home to the largest sardine canning industry in the world. The deteriorated condition of the creek gradually improved after the construction of a water treatment plant in 1970. Today, the majority of the creek is covered and transformed into a culvert with its remnants flowing at Glen Canyon and near the bay.

Many local community organizations were set up to improve the condition of the creek and nearby areas. Friends of Islais Creek, established back in 1984, and David Erickson, a local community figure, were committed to build a waterfront park in Islais Creek. The initial plan for a park was finally launched in 1988 with a $50,000 grant from the State Department of Water Resources as well as community groups in The Bayview. With an additional of $100,000 federal and local grants as well as supports from non-profit organizations and governmental agencies, namely the Sierra Club, San Francisco Municipal Railway (Muni), Department of Public Works, Public Utilities Commission, Port of San Francisco, and Caltrans, the park was finished in 1998. Located adjacent to Pier 80 on the shores of the creek, the Muwekma Ohlone Park or the Muwekma Ohlone Sanctuary is named after the native inhabitants and has since become an important habitat for a wide array of wildlife, including the Pacific Chorus Frog and Mission blue butterfly.

On November 19, 2001, construction crews, while preparing to drill an electrical conduit (consisting of six large 115kV electrical cables) across the creek for the Muni Metro T Third Street light rail line, cracked the concrete sewer underground which carries more than 80 million gallons of sewage a day. The incident flooded the creek and its adjacent Muwekma Ohlone Park with sewage. The park had to be excavated to make way for the repairing of the sewer pipe. It was estimated that it would take more than $101,660 to repair and $65,000 for wildlife habitat restoration.

The remaining Islais Creek Park is next to Cargo Way and 3rd Street. It is home to a historical information sign, a short trail, public art created from a copra loading crane, and a pier with a dock for small boats.

As of December, 2017, the copra crane is lying on its side and the restoration project on hold due to jurisdiction and cost problems.

=== Health hazard ===
Since Islais Creek is a culvert that carries storm water, domestic sewage, and industrial wastewater, it is possible for the sewage to overflow. Such overflow can cause a public health hazard as Islais Creek displays higher level of heavy metals, PCBs, bacteria, as well as organochlorines than other parts of the San Francisco Bay.

== Transportation ==
The Third Street Bridge is the major crossing of the creek, carrying T Third Street light rail line and Third Street. It is a bascule-type drawbridge. The Port of San Francisco extended Illinois Street across Islais Creek over the former railroad trestle in 2006 to relieve traffic for Third Street. This crossing also uses a bascule bridge.

After the Third Street Bridge was deemed to be unsafe in the event of an earthquake, it was slated to be replaced with a non-retractable bridge, ending remaining navigable access to the creek, over the objections of residents and businesses in The Bayview to the disruption it would cause to service on the T Third Street light rail line.

== See also ==
- List of watercourses in the San Francisco Bay Area
