= Tim Urban =

American singer (born 1989)

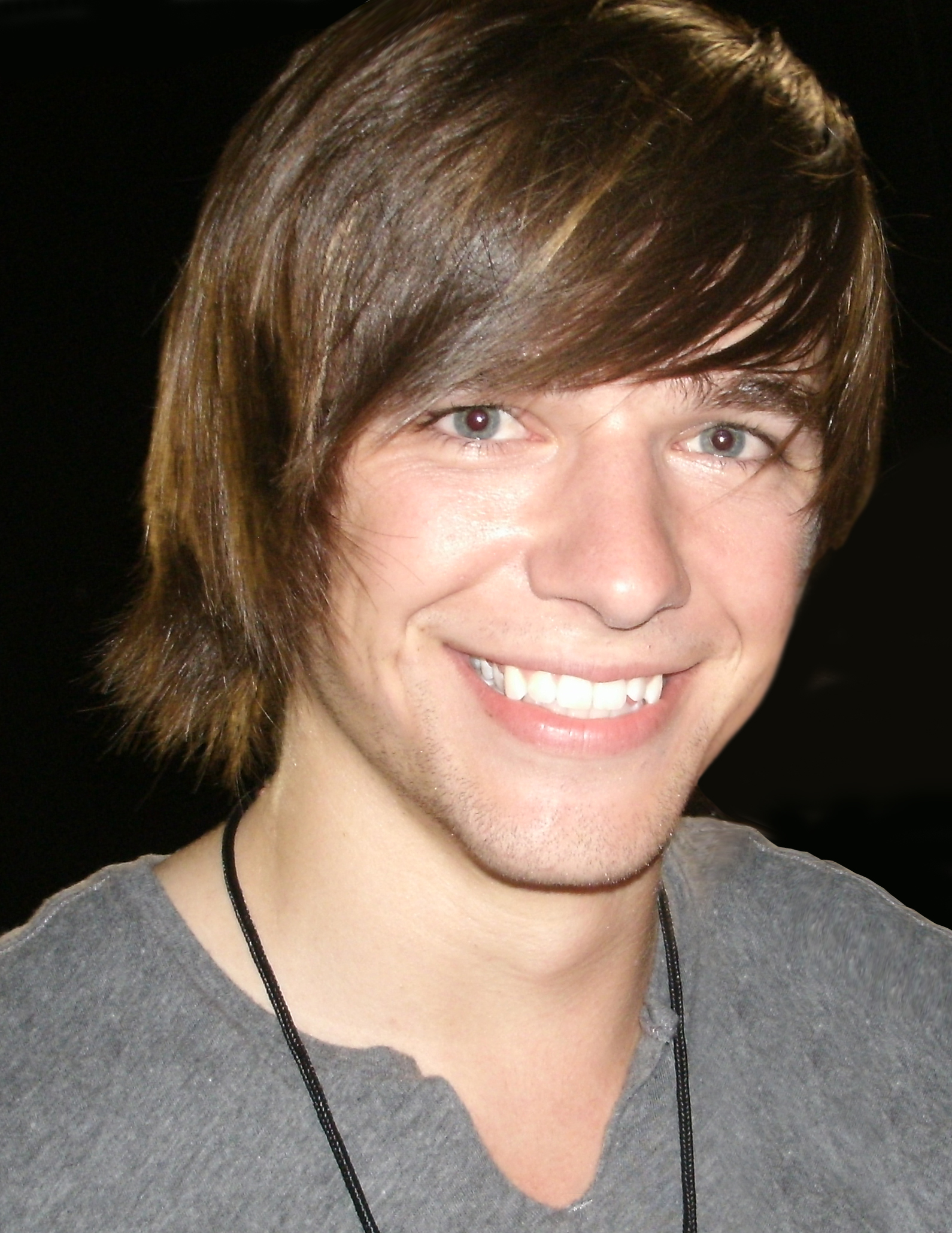
- Urban at Total Mortgage Arena in Bridgeport, Connecticut, July 2010

Background information
- Born: Timothy Joseph Urban; May 1, 1989 (age 37); Tacoma, Washington, U.S.
- Genres: Acoustic; pop rock
- Occupation: Singer
- Years active: 2010–present
- Label: Independent
- Website: web.archive.org/web/20161011234511/http://timurbanmusic.com (Archived)

Timothy Joseph Urban (born May 1, 1989) is an American singer who was the seventh place finalist on the ninth season of American Idol. Following his participation in the series, he released two EPs: Heart of Me in 2010 and New York Sessions in 2014.

== Early life ==
Urban was born in Tacoma, Washington and is the sixth of 10 children. His family moved to Duncanville, Texas when he was five. They were homeschooled by their mother and two of his brothers served in the military. He began to sing and play guitar when he was 13. Before auditioning for American Idol, he worked as a hotel and restaurant singer; he also had a band. The group played regularly in the Dallas/Ft. Worth Christian music circuit and performed twice at Six Flags Over Texas in Arlington.

Tim Urban references several diverse artists as being musical influences including John Denver, Jack Johnson, John Mayer, OneRepublic, Jim Croce, James Taylor, Third Day, Michael Bublé, Coldplay, and Matt Nathanson. Urban was a member of Actors, Models and Talent for Christ (AMTC).

== American Idol ==
Urban tried out for the ninth season of American Idol at the Dallas auditions, and sang "Bulletproof Weeks" by Matt Nathanson. Simon Cowell questioned the song choice, but felt that there was "more to come out of (his performing)." The judges sent Urban through to Hollywood Week and during the first night he sang "Come Back to Me" by American Idol seventh-season winner David Cook. Cowell and Kara DioGuardi both complimented him on the performance, although DioGuardi said that it was "a little shaky." Urban was cut before the Top 24, but was called back after contestant Chris Golightly was disqualified from the competition for having lied about having a past recording contract. Urban survived the semifinal eliminations and won a spot in the ninth's season top 10, securing a place on the 2010 American Idol summer concert tour. On American Idol he was asked what his proudest moment was. The reply came, "Handing out nutritional products to orphans in South Africa and Swaziland."

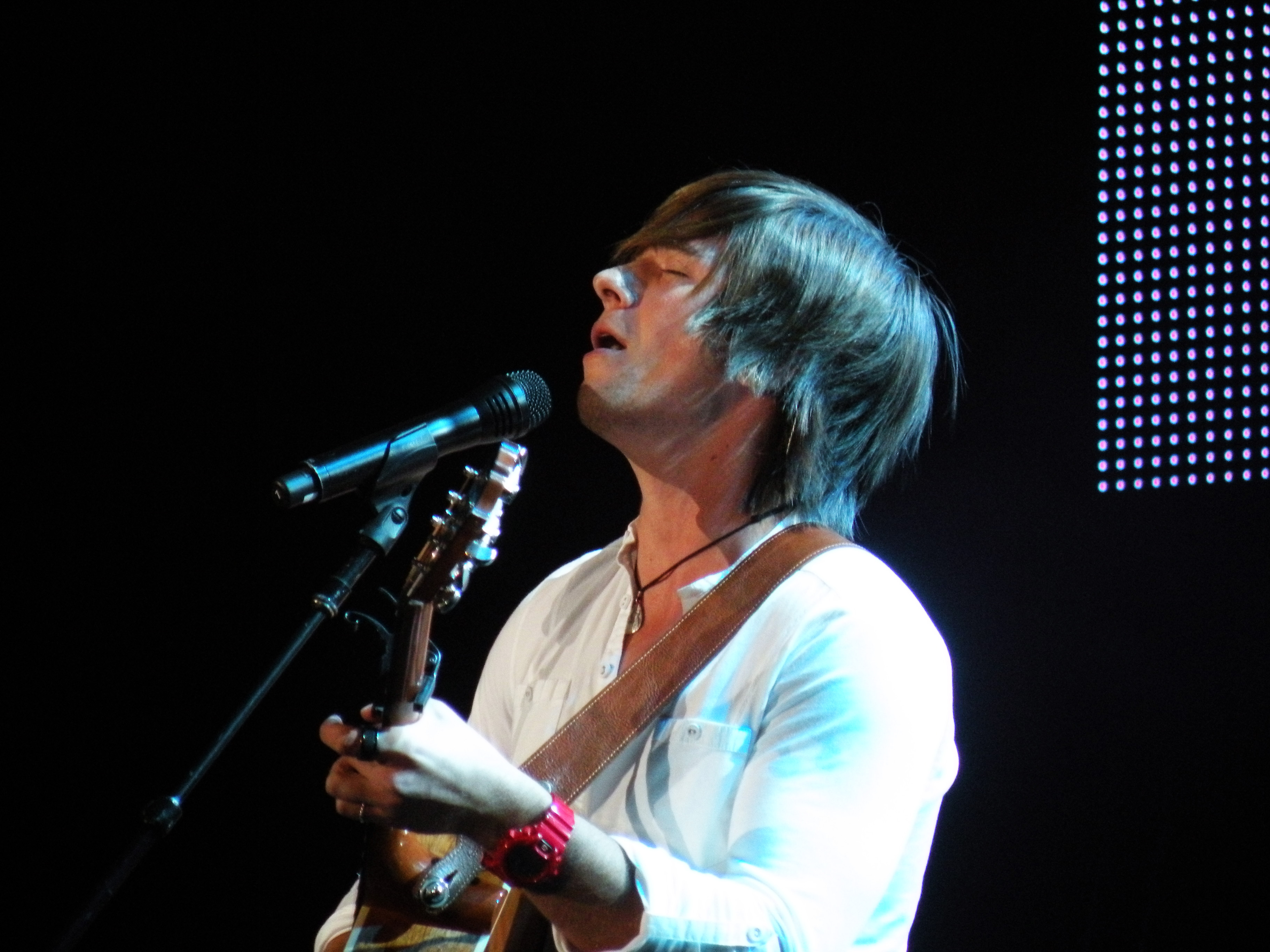
Urban performing on the American Idol Live tour in Denver, August 2010

On the whole, Urban received a mixed reception from the judges, who lauded a few of his performances, but regarded many of them as boring, "pedestrian", and "pointless and silly." Some bloggers compared him to Sanjaya Malakar from the sixth season, noted how the judges' criticisms never seemed to affect the perpetually smiling Urban—or his chances at being saved week after week. He was dubbed "Teflon Tim," a nickname to which host Ryan Seacrest alluded during the March 30 broadcast. "I don't think it makes any difference whatsoever what we say," quipped Simon Cowell the same night. "You're going to smile, the audience is going to vote for you, nobody cares, and you'll be here next week. So well done." As the controversy over Urban's lackluster performances grew, critics of the show began to fault the judges' commentary as "little more than displays of ego or thinly disguised bullying," and suggested that Urban may be good for the show, because he put the judges in their place.

Vote for the Worst, a satirical Idol blog, supported Urban for his entire run during the season. The website claimed Urban held the record for the contestant to survive the longest with its endorsement, outlasting even Malakar. Urban said about the blog, "I'm actually kind of sad that I was on that website." He was eliminated during the "Idol Gives Back" special on April 21, after receiving unenthusiastic reviews for his performance of "Better Days" by Goo Goo Dolls, making him finish the competition in seventh place. A retrospect of Urban's run on Idol followed the announcement of his elimination. Then, presumably because the show ran long, it abruptly ended, without Urban even having a chance to sing a final song. Urban later said, "I was a little sad that I didn't get to sing one last time on that stage, but... you don't always get what you want. I'll be back for the finale and hopefully get to perform on that stage again. It was a little bittersweet, but overall, it's all right."

=== Performances ===
Week #	Theme	Song choice	Original artist	Order #	Result
Audition	Auditioner's Choice	"Bulletproof Weeks"	Matt Nathanson	N/A	Advanced
Hollywood	First Solo	"Come Back to Me"	David Cook	N/A	Advanced
Hollywood	Group Round	"Get Ready"	The Temptations	N/A	Advanced
Hollywood	Second Solo	"Viva la Vida"	Coldplay	N/A	Eliminated^{1}
Top 24 (12 Men)	Billboard Hot 100 Hits	"Apologize"	OneRepublic	4	Safe
Top 20 (10 Men)	Billboard Hot 100 Hits	"Come On Get Higher"	Matt Nathanson	9	Safe
Top 16 (8 Men)	Billboard Hot 100 Hits	"Hallelujah"	Leonard Cohen	3	Safe
Top 12	The Rolling Stones	"Under My Thumb"	The Rolling Stones	7	Bottom 3^{2}
Top 11	Billboard No. 1 Hits	"Crazy Little Thing Called Love"	Queen	3	Bottom 3^{3}
Top 10	R&B/Soul	"Sweet Love"	Anita Baker	5	Bottom 3^{4}
Top 9	Lennon–McCartney	"All My Loving"	The Beatles	6	Safe
Top 9^{5}	Elvis Presley	"Can't Help Falling in Love"	Elvis Presley	3	Safe
Top 7	Inspirational Songs	"Better Days"	Goo Goo Dolls	3	Eliminated

- ^Note 1 Because of the controversy over Chris Golightly's contract, Urban was brought back into the top 24.
- ^Note 2 Urban was saved first from elimination.
- ^Note 3 When Ryan Seacrest announced the results for this particular night, Urban was among the Bottom 3 but declared safe second, as Paige Miles was eliminated.
- ^Note 4 When Ryan Seacrest announced the results for this particular night, Urban was among the Bottom 3 but declared safe second, as Didi Benami was eliminated.
- ^Note 5 Due to the judges' using their one save to save Michael Lynche, the Top 9 remained intact for another week.

== After Idol ==
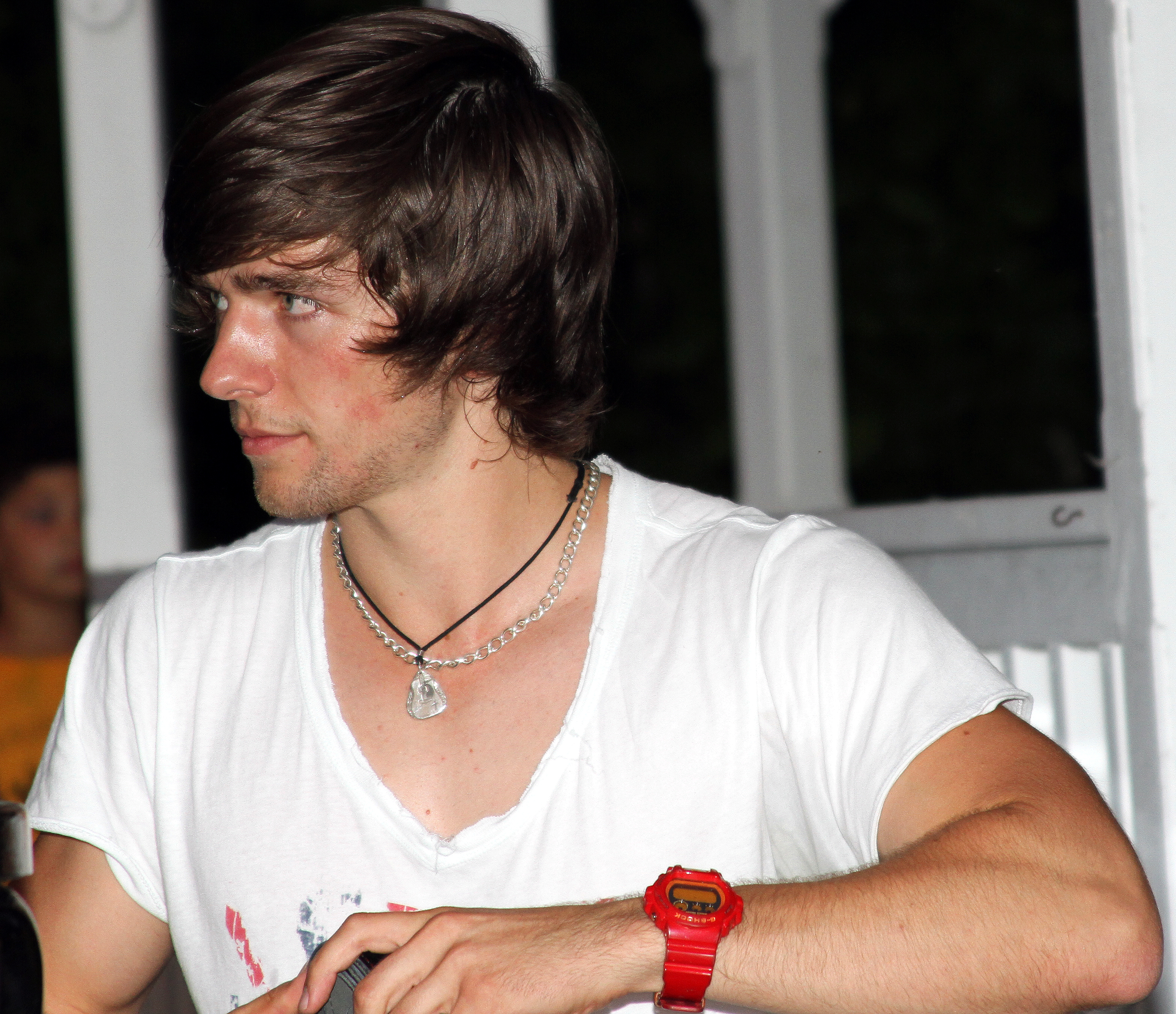
Urban performing in New Windsor, New York, July 2011

Urban went on a media tour on local FOX affiliates, in addition to planned appearances on The Ellen DeGeneres Show, the Late Show with David Letterman, and The Wendy Williams Show. He visited the If I Can Dream house. He was a part of the American Idols Live! Tour 2010 from July 1 to August 31, where he sang "Better Days" and "Viva la Vida". He confirmed on MySpace that he would release an EP. Next, he performed a live show during the half-time football game Duncanville High School vs Garland High School, wearing a Duncanville jersey. He was given the key to the city of Duncanville, Texas by the mayor and his own day "September 3" in his home town, Duncanville.

On November 8, 2010, Urban began releasing a song a day to iTunes from his debut EP Heart of Me. On November 7, 2010, in a live chat with the web site AiNow.org, he said he would be moving to California during the week of November 7, 2010, to work on his acting career and music. He planned to book TV appearances to promote his album there. His first single, "Heart of Me", was released online November 7, 2010, and to iTunes on November 8, 2010. In the next few days (in order) "Wheels Touch Down", "You and I", "P.S.", "Lullaby", and "Blur" were put up on iTunes.

On May 1, 2012, Urban released his first single, "Someday", from his debut album due for a 2012 release as a temporary free download and released the music video for the single in May 2012. He ran a Kickstarter campaign to raise money to record and release two new songs, "Perfectly You" and "Tears for Hallelujah." The songs were to be released in early 2014. In 2014, he released his second EP, New York Sessions.

Urban is a YouTube personality representing golf manufacturer Takomo, known for appearing in golf-themed collaborative videos on YouTube with creators such as Luke Kwon, Taco Golf, Wesley Bryan, and Sam Heung-Min. His nickname is "Takomo Tim" in these videos. His appearances include challenge and match-style content alongside other golf influencers, where participants compete or engage in entertaining formats centered on golf skills and friendly competition.

== Discography ==
=== Extended plays ===
Year	Album details
2010	Heart of Me: Released: November 13, 2010; Label: self-released
2014	New York Sessions: Released: February 11, 2014

=== Singles ===
Year	Single	Album
2010	"Heart of Me"	Heart of Me
2012	"Someday"	N/A
2012	"Perfectly You"	N/A
