= Precita Park =

Municipal park in San Francisco, California

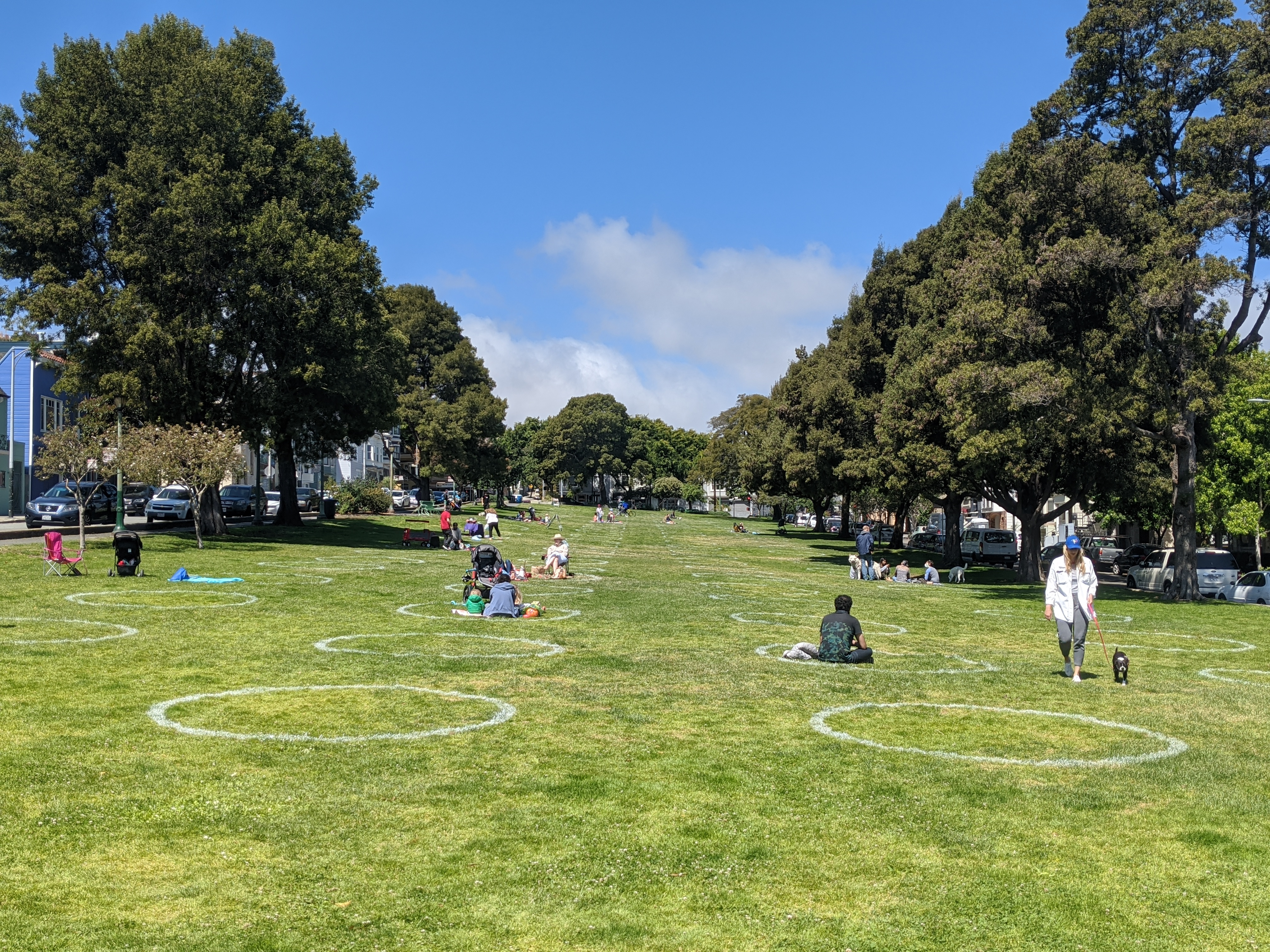
- Precita Park in 2020, showing social-distancing circles
- Interactive map of Precita Park
- Type: Municipal
- Location: San Francisco, California
- Coordinates: 37.747056°N 122.412028°W
- Area: 2.06 acres (0.83 ha)
- Operator: San Francisco Recreation & Parks Department

Precita Park is a 2.06-acre (0.83 ha) municipal park in San Francisco, California. It is located at Folsom Street and Precita Avenue, which bounds both the north and south sides of the park, and is also bordered by Alabama Street, in the Bernal Heights neighborhood.

== History ==
The park gets its name from the Precita Creek. In the area now called "Precita Park", a village had developed by the 1860s. The village drew its water from an upstream portion of the creek and used the creek as an open sewer. Between the 1880s and the 1900s, Precita Creek was paved over to create Army Street (now Cesar Chavez Street).

== See also ==
- Precita Eyes
