= Run (Matt Nathanson and Sugarland song) =

- Original single cover

Single by Matt Nathanson featuring Sugarland

from the album Modern Love
- Released: November 9, 2011
- Genre: Pop rock; country pop
- Length: 4:09 (Album version); 4:05 (Sugarland version)
- Label: Vanguard; Capitol
- Songwriters: Matt Nathanson; Jennifer Nettles; Kristian Bush
- Producers: Mark Weinberg; Matt Nathanson; Marshall Altman

Matt Nathanson singles chronology
"Faster" (2011)	"Run" (2011)	"Modern Love" (2012)

Sugarland singles chronology
"Tonight" (2011)	"Run" (2011)	"Still the Same" (2017)

Alternate covers
- Sugarland version cover

"Run" is a song written by American singer-songwriter Matt Nathanson with Jennifer Nettles and Kristian Bush of country duo Sugarland, and recorded for Nathanson's seventh studio album, Modern Love (2011). The song is performed as a duet between Nathanson and Nettles, with Bush contributing backing vocals as well as the acoustic and electric guitar accompaniments. It made its debut at the 2010 CMA Awards on November 9, 2011. A remastered country version was released to digital retailers via Vanguard Records the same day as the third single from Modern Love.

== Background and release ==
"Run" was released to digital retails on November 9, 2011 through Vanguard Records. It was serviced to hot adult contemporary radio on January 16, 2012 through Vanguard and Capitol Records.

Accreditation of the song varies, with AllMusic crediting Bush and Nettles separately as featured artists, the iTunes Store crediting Sugarland collectively, and the digital single attributing the song to Sugarland as the primary artist and Nathanson as a featured artist.

== Critical reception ==
Bobby Peacock of Roughstock gave a positive review of "Run", which he declared "at its core... boils down to a country lyric," commenting that "the seemingly different voices (not to mention musical backgrounds) unite perfectly, helped by a slick (but in a good way), powerful pop production." PopCrush reviewer Scott Shetler deemed "Run" inferior to Nettles' previous pop/rock collaboration (Bon Jovi's "Who Says You Can't Go Home"), but consented that "Run" was a "pleasant pop song with a decent hook and nice harmonies" and ultimately ranked the song 3.5/5 stars. Billy Dukes of Taste of Country described "Run" as a "stop-and-thinker that could easily be dismissed if listened to haphazardly" due to the hidden depths of the lyrics, and lauded the combination of Nathanson and Nettles' voices: "Not since Jon Bon Jovi has a male lead complimented Nettles’ beckoning drawl so naturally." Andrew Leahey of AllMusic was more critical of the song and Nettles' vocals in particular, leading him to label "Run" as "one of the album’s most misguided moves".

== Music videos ==
Three official music videos exist for "Run". The Sugarland version was directed by Valarie Allyn Bienas and premiered February 9, 2012. This video feature live footage from the CMA Awards performance. A solo Matt Nathanson video premiered March 27, 2012 and a collaborative video (titled "Run ft. Sugarland") premiered the following day on March 28, 2012; the latter video was directed by Brendan Walter.

== Chart performance ==
Chart (2011–12)	Peak position
US Billboard Hot 100	53
US Adult Pop Airplay (Billboard)	17
US Heatseekers Songs (Billboard)	2
US Hot Country Songs (Billboard)	60
US Rock Digital Songs (Billboard)	4

== Release history ==
Country	Date	Format	Label(s)	Ref.
Canada	November 9, 2011	Digital download	Vanguard Records	
United States	November 9, 2011	Digital download	Vanguard Records	
United States	January 16, 2012	Hot adult contemporary	Vanguard Records, Capitol Records	
