= Matt Nathanson: Live at Google =

Live album by Matt Nathanson
- Released: December 8, 2011
- Genres: Alternative, Indie
- Length: 42:24
- Label: Vanguard

Matt Nathanson chronology
Modern Love (2011)	Matt Nathanson: Live at Google (2011)

Matt Nathanson: Live at Google is a live recording of Matt Nathanson's performance at the Google Campus in early July 2011 to promote Google's new service, Music Beta by Google (subsequently rebranded as YouTube Music).

== Track listing ==
No.	Title	Length
1.	"To The Beat of our Noisy Hearts"	3:45
2.	"Modern Love"	4:30
3.	"Room at the End of the World"	4:55
4.	"Still"	4:50
5.	"Sing-Along"	4:00
6.	"Laid"	2:34
7.	"Kept"	3:24
8.	"Misogyny"	3:48
9.	"Faster"	3:25
10.	"Enrique"	2:16
11.	"Come On Get Higher"	5:07

== Recording and production ==
=== At Google ===
During the Summer of 2011, Music Beta by Google was hosting a series of concerts at the Googleplex. The second in the series of concerts was opened by jazz artist Meklit Hadero and headlined by Matt Nathanson.

Throughout the show Nathanson made jabs at both audience members and even Facebook. One notable instance was while Nathanson was preparing the audience for a sing-a-long, he called attention to an audience member on his laptop when he said, "You're in the front, you're on your computer, but I know what you're doing is looking up the lyrics. You don't have to look up the lyrics, because this is totally easy. 'Hee,' 'hee,' 'who.' It's - and I feel it, I felt you wanting to sing."
