= Bernal Heights, San Francisco =

Bernal Heights
- Neighborhood
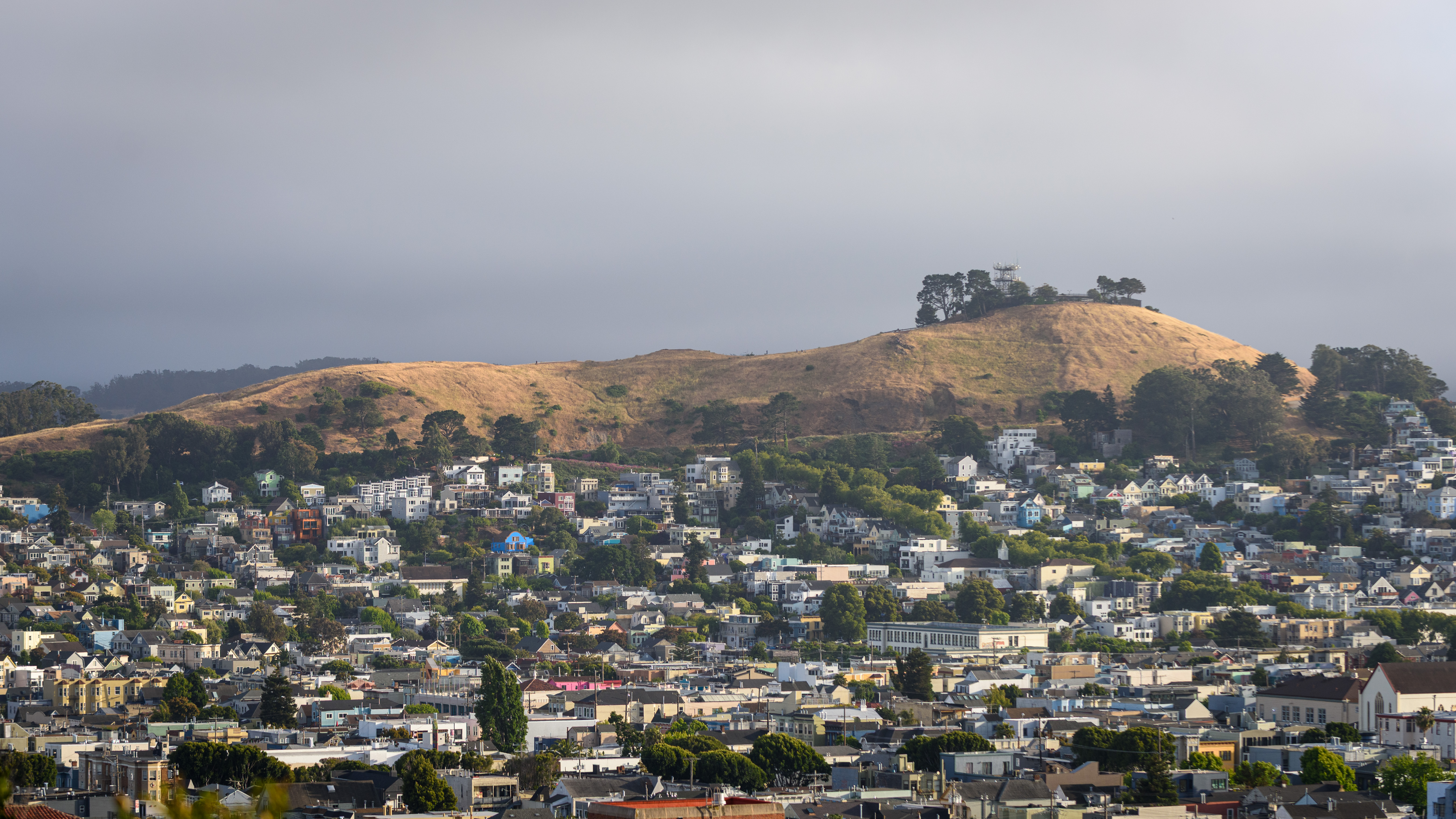
- The Bernal Heights hill and surrounding houses.
- Nicknames: Bernal, BH
- Location within San Francisco
- Coordinates: 37.74156°N 122.41439°W
- Country: United States
- State: California
- City-county: San Francisco

Government
  - Supervisor: Jackie Fielder
  - Assemblymember: Matt Haney (D)
  - State senator: Scott Wiener (D)
  - U. S. rep.: Nancy Pelosi (D)

Area
  - Total: 1.049 sq mi (2.72 km^{2})

Population (2019)
  - Total: 25,125
  - Density: 23,950/sq mi (9,248/km^{2})
- Time zone: UTC-8 (Pacific)
  - Summer (DST): UTC-7 (PDT)
- ZIP codes: 94110, 94112
- Area codes: 415/628

Bernal Heights (/ˈbɜːrnəl/ BUR-nəl) is a residential neighborhood in southeastern San Francisco, California. The prominent Bernal Heights hill overlooks the San Francisco skyline and features a microwave transmission tower. The nearby Sutro Tower can be seen from the Bernal Heights neighborhood.

== Location ==
Bernal Heights lies to the south of San Francisco's Mission District. Its most prominent feature is the open parkland and radio tower on its large rocky hill, Bernal Heights Summit. Bernal is bounded by Cesar Chavez Street to the north, San Jose Avenue to the west, US 101 to the east, and I-280 to the south.

== History ==
Bernal Heights was part of the 1839 Rancho Rincon de las Salinas y Potrero Viejo, a 4,446-acre (17.99 km^{2}) Mexican land grant awarded to José Cornelio Bernal (1796–1842). By 1860, the land belonged to François Louis Alfred Pioche (1818–1872), a Frenchman and financier, who subdivided it into smaller lots. Its streets were laid out during the Civil War by Army engineers from the Presidio, which explains why so many Bernal streets are named for military men. It was first populated primarily by Irish immigrants who farmed the land and ran dairy ranches. According to legend, a mini gold rush was triggered in 1876 when con artists planted the hilltop with traces of gold.

Bernal Heights experienced a period of growth after the 1906 San Francisco earthquake as displaced people from San Francisco moved to the neighborhood for temporary or permanent residence. Built atop bedrock consisting largely of seismic-dampening radiolarian chert, many of the hill's structures had survived the tremor, and the sparseness of the development saved much of Bernal from the ravages of the firestorm that followed. The commercial corridor of Eugenia Avenue filled in with shops as the pastureland on the hilltop was developed for workers' homes during the rapid rebuilding of the city. Some of the tiny earthquake cottages, which the city built to house quake refugees, survive to this day, including three that were moved up to Bernal Heights. During World War II, the area saw another population surge. The new arrivals included many African-American families who worked at the nearby San Francisco Naval Shipyard at Hunters Point. During the Vietnam War, the neighborhood was known as "Red Hill" for the anti-war activists in shared households and collectives who moved in among the working-class families.

Since c. 1976, the Wild Side West, a queer and lesbian bar, has occupied space on Cortland Avenue.

By the 1990s, Bernal's pleasant microclimate, small houses (some with traditional Victorian or Edwardian architecture) and freeway access to the peninsula and Silicon Valley led to a third wave of migration. Bernal has not gentrified to the extent of its neighbor Noe Valley, but gentrification and property values are increasing as urban professionals replace working-class home owners and renters.

Notable residents and former residents include Tom Ammiano, Honey Lee Cottrell, Dan Nakamura, Carlos Santana, Annie Sprinkle, Charles Gatewood, Terry Zwigoff Matt Nathanson, David Pescovitz, and children's author Jane Wattenberg (aka Mrs. Mustard).

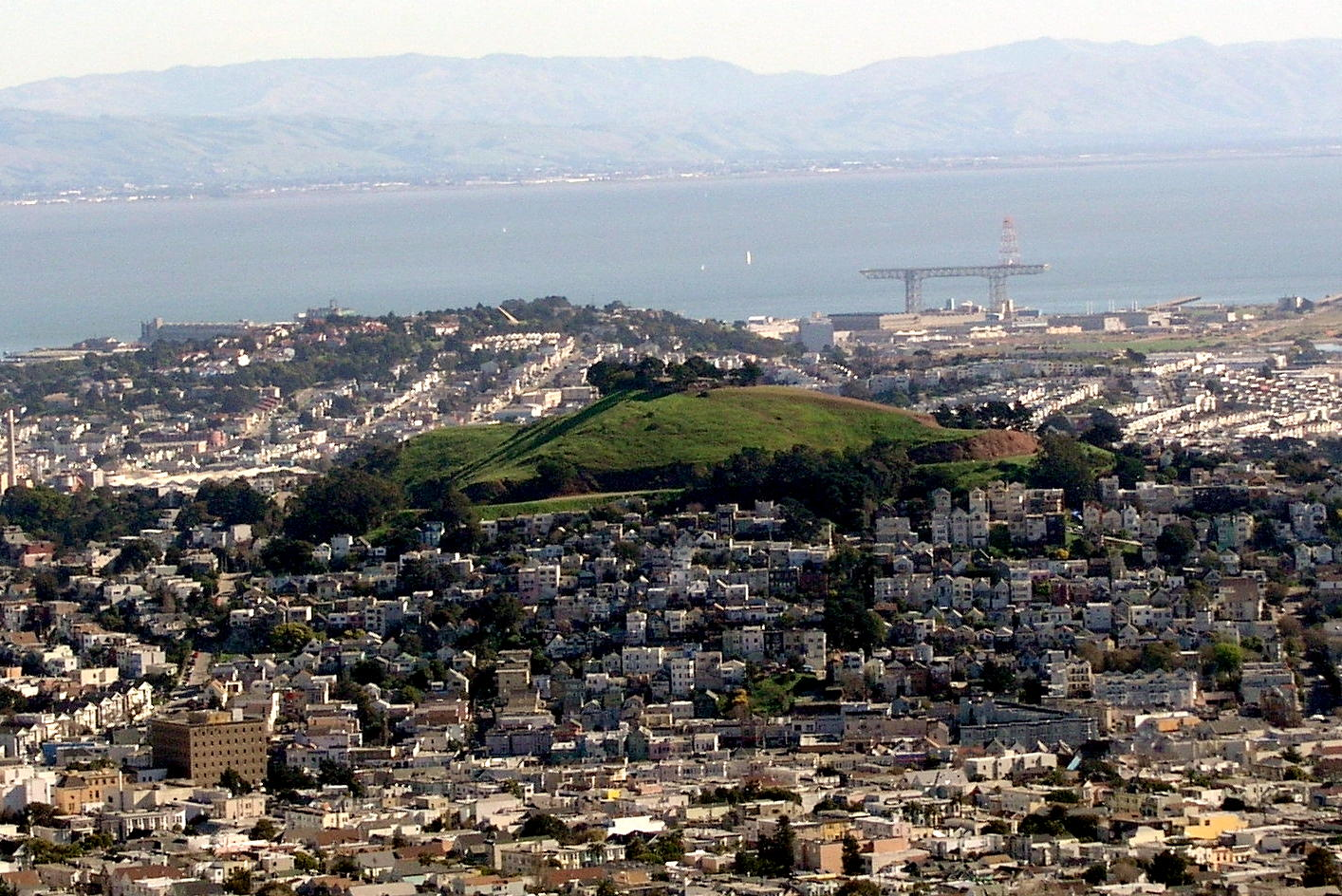
Bernal Heights. The Mission District is in the foreground and Hunters Point and the bay are in the background

== Attractions and characteristics ==
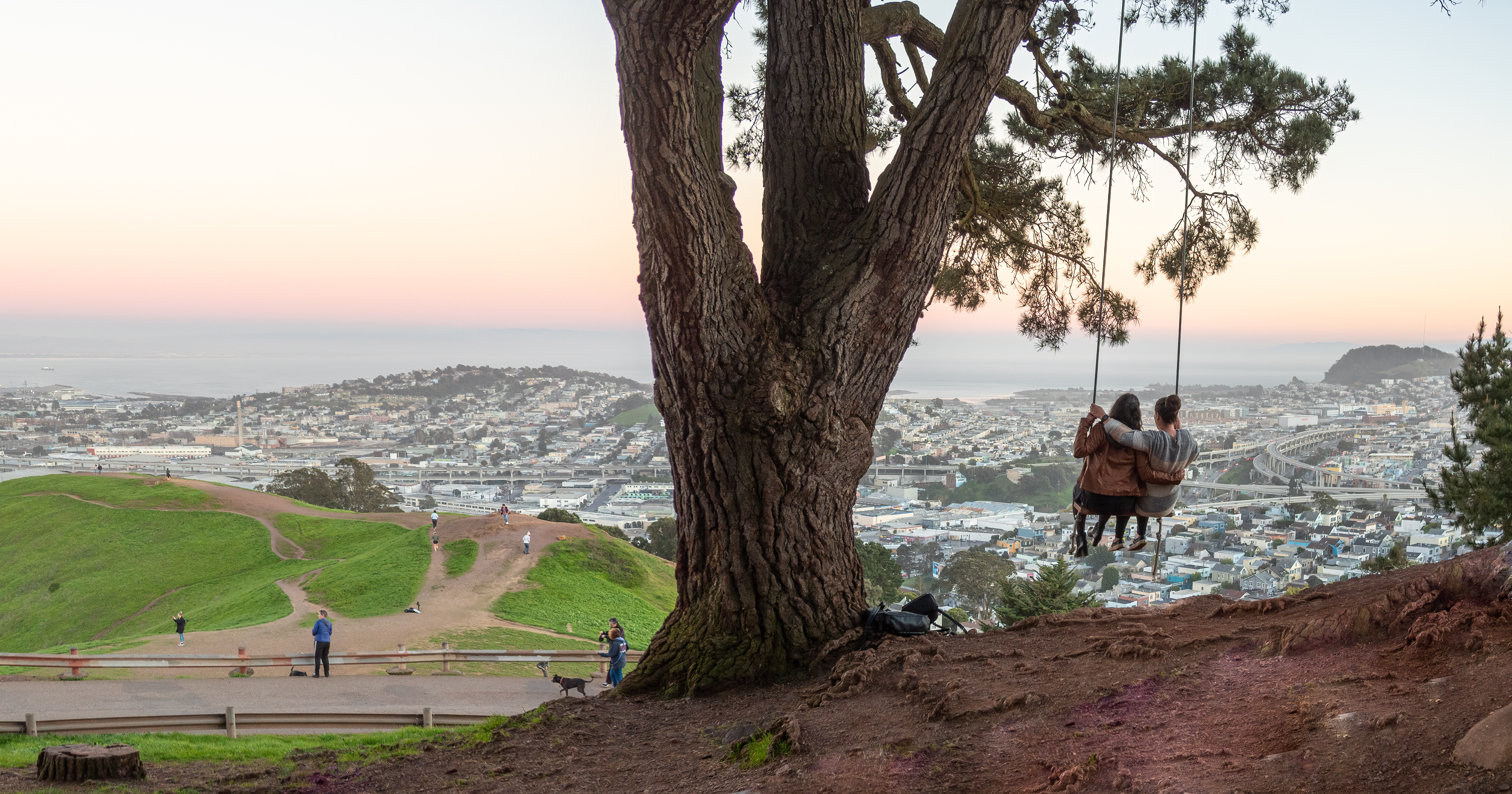
Swing near the top of Bernal Heights Park, looking east.

The neighborhood is primarily residential, with a commercial strip along Cortland Avenue featuring restaurants, bakeries, a fish and butchery shop, multiple salons and other commercial businesses. The local branch of the San Francisco Public Library at 500 Cortland was built by Frederick H. Meyer with funding from the Works Progress Administration and dedicated in 1940. After closing for nearly two years for renovations and after much long-standing contention over the murals that adorn the library's exterior, the library reopened in January 2010. There is also a collection of restaurants and cafés at the bottom of the northern slope, near the Cesar Chavez Avenue border. They center around the newly renovated rectangular Precita Park. Also notable in that area is Precita Eyes, a mural art center.

A strong tradition of neighborhood activism led to the establishment of the Bernal Heights Neighborhood Center in 1979. It works to promote community organizing, affordable housing services, senior services, and youth services. Additionally, the neighborhood center hosts "Fiesta on the Hill", one of the last street fairs of the summer festival season. The fair is billed as a "community-building event", and takes place on the third Sunday in October.

Bernal's north slope has been referred to as one of San Francisco's "banana belts", with warmer temperatures from San Francisco Bay and less marine fog making its way inland.

The grassland on the hilltop is home to a remarkable urban ecosystem, including the majority of native north-coast wildflowers — most notable of which is the state flower: the California poppy — raccoons, opossums, skunks, raptors (including American kestrels, red-tailed hawks, Cooper's hawks, sharp-shinned hawks, and great horned owls), and at times, at least one coyote. The radio tower is a major connection point for the metropolitan San Francisco area. Bernal Hill Park is a designated "off-leash" park for dogs, and it is a destination for many dogs and their owners since it is one of the largest parks in San Francisco. Bernal Heights Boulevard, which circles the hilltop, has about a 1-mile-long (1.6 km) path of asphalt and hard packed sand for walking and running that is closed to motor traffic. It is also the site of the San Francisco Illegal Soapbox Society's annual derby.

Precita Park, named after its eponymous creek, and Holly Park provide grassy open areas to the north and south of the hill, respectively.

The park is known for its unusually steep streets. Bradford above Tompkins, with an alleged 41% grade, is claimed to be the steepest in the world, but this has yet to be graded by Guinness World Records.

=== Alemany Farmers' Market ===
The southeast corner of Bernal Heights is home to the open-air Alemany Farmers' Market, one of the oldest extant farmers' markets in the US, operating every Saturday in this location since August 4, 1947. A flea market occupies the market area on Sundays.

The Market gets its name from the Alemany Farm located in the neighborhood. In turn, the farm is home to the Alemany Farm Springs.

== Geology ==
San Francisco as seen from Bernal Heights

Bernal Hill, along with the other hills in the San Francisco area, is a folded hill, created by the "wrinkling up" effect of the Pacific Plate subducting under the North American Plate, when the North American and Pacific plates were converging, around 150 million years ago. Near the summit you will find folded layers of very hard rock called radiolarian chert. It is a high in silica sedimentary rock which gets its silica content from the shells of microscopic creatures called radiolaria. The red color comes from iron oxide. In between the layers of chert are thinner layers of shale in many different colors from the same red as the surrounding rock to white, green and purple. Other types of rocks and minerals on the hill include serpentinite, jasper and clay. The alternating layers of rock type suggest a seasonal cycle of influx of sea water, carrying the radiolaria and outflow of the Sacramento River carrying silt and mud.

== See also ==
- List of San Francisco, California Hills
- Death of Alex Nieto
