= Precita Creek =

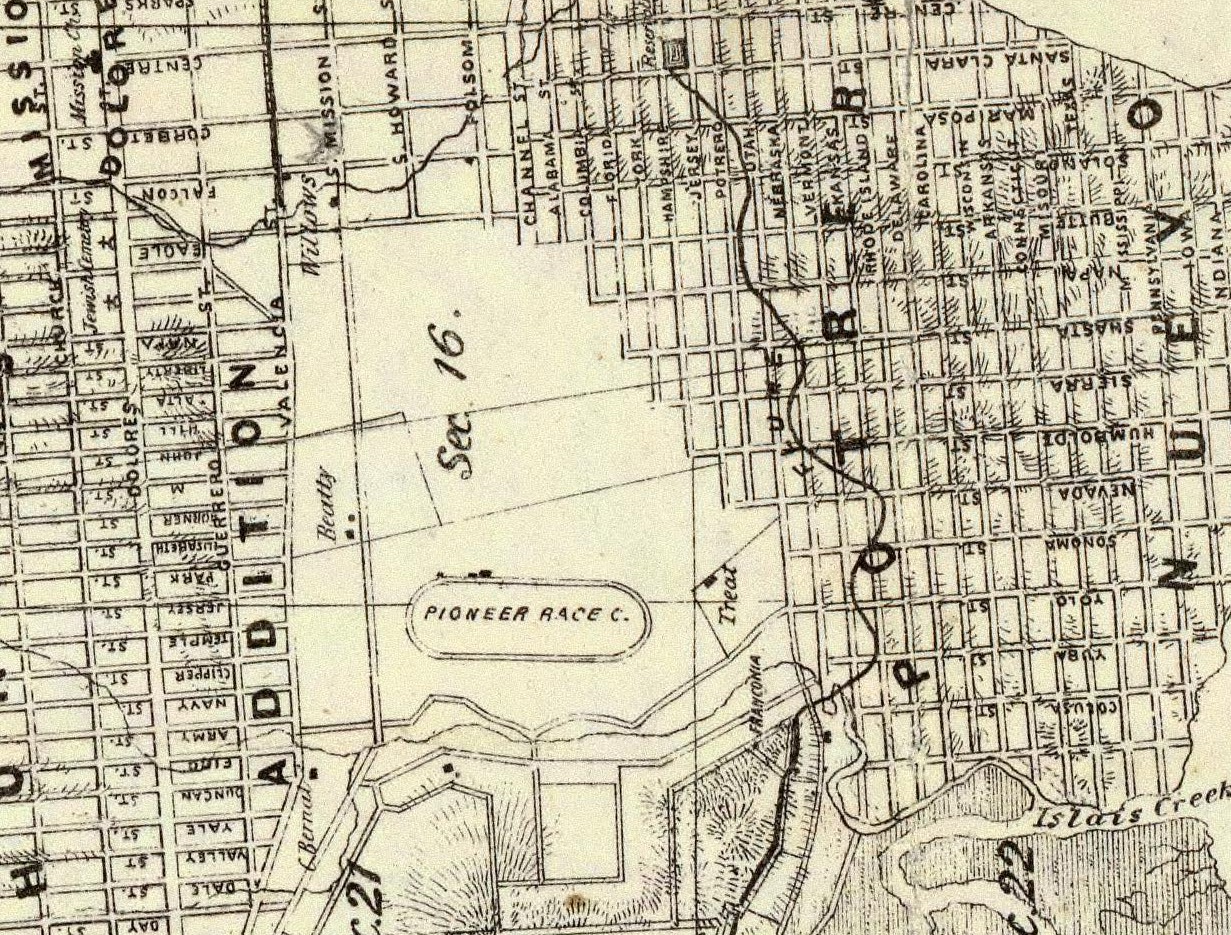
- 1861 Map of San Francisco showing the Precita Creek just south of the Pioneer Race Course

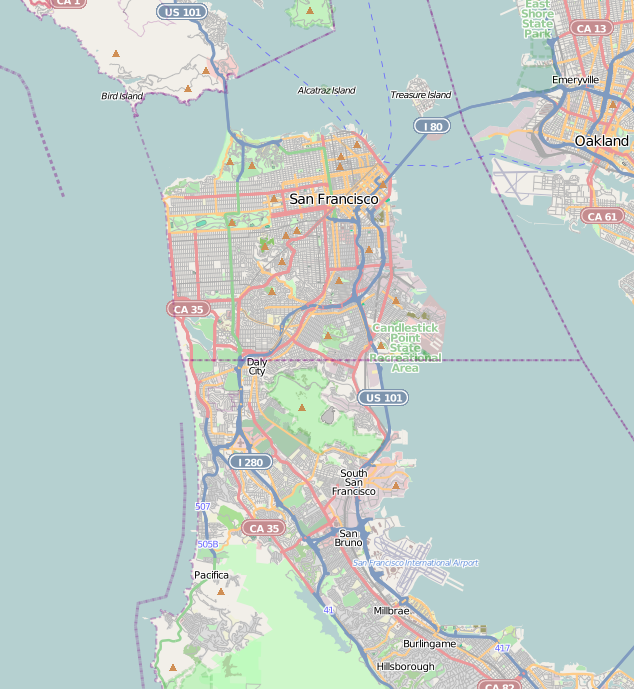
- Location within San Francisco Location within California Location within the United States
- Etymology: Precita, the Spanish word meaning dam or weir

Location
- Country: United States
- State: California
- Counties: City and County of San Francisco
- City: San Francisco

Physical characteristics
- Source: Market Street and 24th Street
  - location: Near Bernal Heights, City and County of San Francisco, California
  - coordinates: 37°45′2.8″N 122°26′34.7″W
  - elevation: 486 ft (148 m)
- Mouth: Islais Creek
  - location: Near Islais Creek, City & County of San Francisco, California
  - coordinates: 37°44′58.31″N 122°23′50.262″W
  - elevation: 30 ft (9.1 m)
- Length: 3 mi (4.8 km)

Precita Creek is a small creek in the Bernal Heights and Mission District neighborhoods of San Francisco, California. Its course is mirrored by the current Precita Avenue, which ran along the creek when it was laid out sometime during the early 1850s. The creek gets its name from precita, the Spanish word meaning dam or weir. The stream was buried before the beginning of the 20th century.

== Course ==
Starting near Market Street and 24th Street, the old stream follows Precita Avenue and Cesar Chavez Street, ending in the Islais Creek’s estuarine bog near the intersection of Cesar Chavez Street and Evans Avenue.

This branch of Islais Creek left it at a point where what is now Evans Avenue intersects Army Street and proceeded in a winding westerly, southerly and northwesterly course crossing Army Street three times between Vermont and Utah Streets, its channel being in what is now Army Street from Potrero Avenue to San Jose Avenue. Though the channel itself was not very wide after crossing Potrero Avenue, the marshes, according to William J. Lewis, to whom we shall refer in a subsequent chapter, were from six hundred to eight hundred feet wide. From Potrero Avenue southwesterly to San Jose Avenue it was paralleled on the north by what was known as Serpentine Avenue and on the south by Precita Avenue, the latter, however, extending to Mission Street. The creek was probably fresh water from San Jose Avenue for some distance easterly.

== History ==
Precita Avenue was laid along the creek sometime during the early 1850s. In the area now called Precita Park, a village had developed by the 1860s. The village drew its water from an upstream portion of the creek and used the creek as an open sewer. Between the 1880s and the 1900s, Precita Creek was paved over to create Army Street (now Cesar Chavez Street).

== See also ==
- List of watercourses in the San Francisco Bay Area
- Islais Creek
- Lobos Creek
