= When Everything Meant Everything =

EP by Matt Nathanson
- Released: November 2002
- Genre: Alternative, pop rock
- Label: Acrobat

Matt Nathanson chronology
Still Waiting for Spring (1999)	When Everything Meant Everything (2002)	Plus (2003)

When Everything Meant Everything is an EP by Matt Nathanson, released in November 2002. It was his last independent release before his Universal debut.

== Track listing ==
1. "Pretty the World" – 3:36
2. "Fall to Pieces" – 3:42
3. "Princess" – 3:09
4. "Weight of It All" – 3:15
5. "Bent" – 3:49
