= Plus (Matt Nathanson EP) =

Live album (EP) by Matt Nathanson
- Released: October 14, 2003
- Recorded: August 2003
- Genre: Classical guitar
- Label: Acrobat Records

Matt Nathanson chronology
When Everything Meant Everything (2002)	Plus (2003)	Beneath These Fireworks (2003)

Plus is a live EP by Matt Nathanson containing three songs. It was released on October 14, 2003, the same day as his full-length album Beneath These Fireworks.

== Track listing ==
1. "Lucky Boy" – Recorded live at Ned's Studio on August 20, 2003. Featuring Matt Fish on cello. Recorded and mixed by Larry Hirsch.
2. "Lost Myself in Search of You" – Recorded live at Ned's Studio on August 20, 2003. Featuring Matt Fish on cello. Recorded and mixed by Larry Hirsch.
3. "Sad Songs" – Recorded live on San Francisco Bay Area's radio station KFOG's Morning Show on August 28, 2003.
