= Bernal Heights Summit =

Hill in San Francisco, California, U.S.

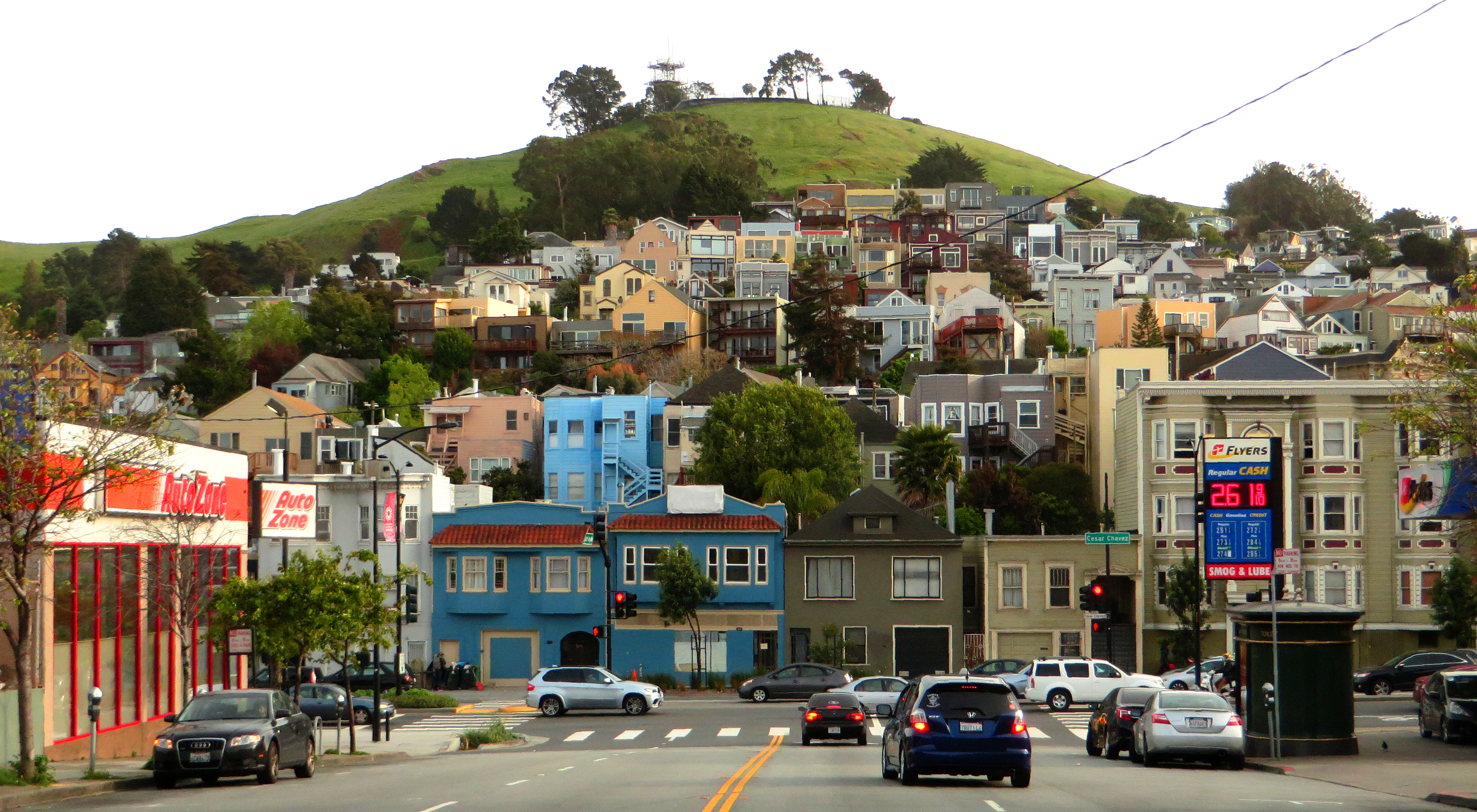
- Bernal Heights hill viewed from the north

Highest point
- Elevation: 475+ feet (145+ m) NGVD 29
- Coordinates: 37°44′35″N 122°24′57″W

Geography
- Location: San Francisco, California, U.S.
- Topo map: USGS San Francisco South

Bernal Heights Summit (/ˈbɜːrnəl/ BUR-nəl) or Bernal Heights Hill is a hill in the San Francisco, California neighborhood of Bernal Heights. Upper elevations are part of Bernal Heights Park, a 26.3-acre (10.6 ha) public park managed by the San Francisco Recreation & Parks Department. At its highest elevation (466 ft.) is a privately owned equipment building and 50-foot tall telecommunications tower. The tower does not have an official name, but some residents call it "Sutrito", as it resembles a shorter version of Sutro Tower. The park and summit are largely surrounded by Bernal Heights Boulevard.

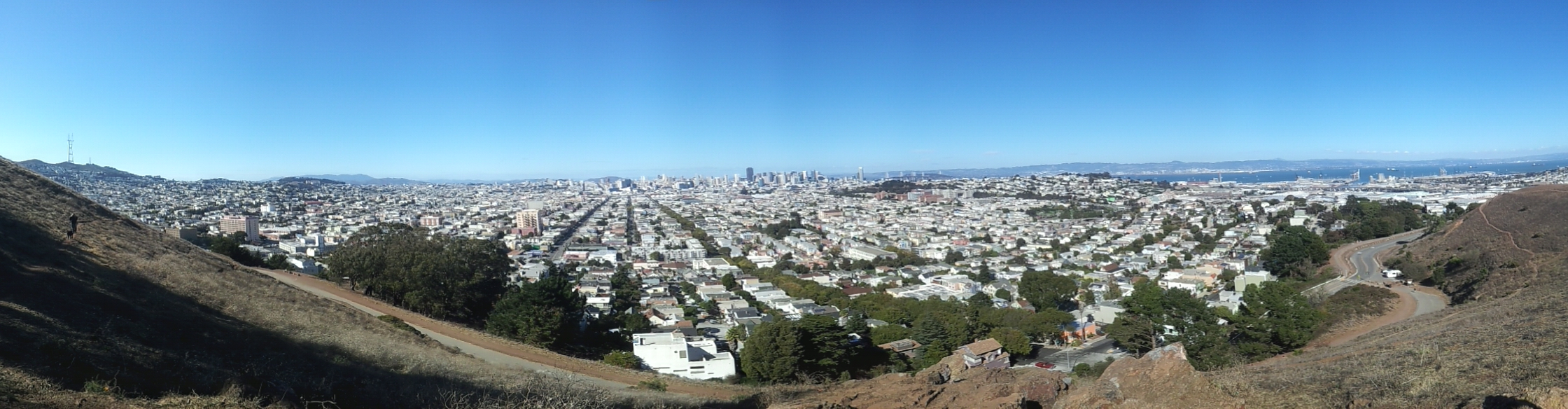
Panorama from Bernal Heights Summit

== Ecology ==
Unusual flora and fauna can be found on Bernal Hill. Wildflowers include the footsteps of spring, blue-eyed grass, checkerbloom, shooting star and yellow mariposa lily. Bernal Hill was one of the earliest hills in San Francisco to be re-colonized by wild coyotes.

== Geology ==
Bernal Hill, along with the other hills in the San Francisco area, is a folded hill; it was created by the "wrinkling up" effect of the Pacific plate subducting under the North American plate, when the North American and Pacific plates were converging around 150 million years ago. Near the summit are folded layers of very hard rock called radiolarian chert. It is a sedimentary silicate rock which gets its silica content from the shells of microscopic creatures called radiolaria. The red color comes from iron oxide. Between the chert layers are thin layers of shale in many different colors from the same red as the surrounding rock to white, green, and purple. Other types of rocks and minerals on the hill include serpentinite, jasper, and clay.

== See also ==
- List of hills in San Francisco
- List of summits of the San Francisco Bay Area
