= Last of the Great Pretenders =

Studio album by Matt Nathanson
- Released: July 16, 2013
- Genre: Rock, pop, acoustic
- Length: 38:41
- Label: Vanguard
- Producer: Matt Nathanson with Mike Viola and Jake Sinclair

Matt Nathanson chronology
Modern Love (2011)	Last of the Great Pretenders (2013)	Show Me Your Fangs (2015)

Professional ratings
Review scores
Source	Rating
AllMusic	4/5 stars

Last of the Great Pretenders is the eighth studio album by American singer-songwriter Matt Nathanson. It was released on July 16, 2013. Last of the Great Pretenders is Nathanson's third album for Vanguard Records, following his 2007 album Some Mad Hope and 2011 album Modern Love. He released the first single, "Mission Bells", as a free download to his fan mailing list in March 2013. Last of the Great Pretenders debuted on number 16 on the Billboard 200 for the week of July 29, 2013.

== Track listing ==
No.	Title	Writer(s)	Length
1.	"Earthquake Weather"	Matt Nathanson; Mike Viola; Sam Hollander	4:09
2.	"Mission Bells"	Nathanson; Viola; Jake Sinclair	3:39
3.	"Last Days of Summer In San Francisco"	Nathanson; Sinclair; Daniel Heath	3:38
4.	"Kinks Shirt"	Nathanson; Viola; Sinclair; Amir Salem	2:59
5.	"Sky High Honey"	Nathanson; Viola	3:26
6.	"Annie's Always Waiting (For the Next One to Leave)"	Nathanson	2:56
7.	"Kill the Lights"	Nathanson; Viola; Sinclair; Salem	3:04
8.	"Heart Starts"	Nathanson; Viola; Hollander	3:18
9.	"Birthday Girl"	Nathanson; Joby J. Ford	4:03
10.	"Sunday New York Times"	Nathanson; Kevin Griffin	3:14
11.	"Farewell, December"	Nathanson; JT Harding; Shane McAnally	4:01

== Personnel ==
Musicians

- Matt Nathanson - Primary Artist, Lead & Background Vocals, Acoustic & Electric Guitar
- Aaron Tap - Acoustic & Electric Guitar, Background Vocals
- Victor Indrizzo - Drums
- Chris Reynolds - Drums, Engineer, Synthesizer
- Jake Sinclair - Bass, Drums, Guitar, Mixing, Producer, Programming, Vocals (Background)
- Mike Viola - Bass, Guitar, Keyboards, Producer, Vocals (Background)

== Charts ==
Chart (2013)	Peak position
U.S. Billboard 200	16
