= Heart of Me (song) =

Single by Tim Urban

from the album Heart of Me
- Released: November 7, 2010 (Online)
- Recorded: September 2010
- Length: 3:50
- Label: Indie
- Songwriter(s): Tim Urban

"Heart of Me" is the first single from Tim Urban's debut EP and album Heart of Me.

== Premiere ==
"Heart of Me" on November 7, 2010, at Ainow.org a day before it was put out onto iTunes.

== Promotion ==
Urban will be promoting the album online and in various interviews and talk shows. Urban was on "FOX Dallas Morning News" on November 8, 2010, where he performed the single. Urban has also done several online interviews, and will be working on promoting the single and EP on shows in California.

== Reviews ==
Neonlimeight states "The sentimental ballad is bolstered by swirling guitar rifts and heartfelt lyrics."

What Kyle Music Reviews and More states "I give this single a 5 out of 5 for the fact that it shows how he has grown since Idol."

== Music video ==
On November 7, 2010, in a live chat with AiNow.org Urban stated that he wants to film a music video for the single and is figuring out all the details. A music video for the single was never released and Urban began work on his full-length debut album.
