= Faster (Matt Nathanson song) =

Single by Matt Nathanson

from the album Modern Love
- Released: March 29, 2011
- Recorded: 2011
- Genre: Soft rock, acoustic
- Length: 3:28
- Label: Acrobat, Vanguard
- Songwriters: Matt Nathanson and Mark Weinberg
- Producers: Mark Weinberg and Matt Nathanson, Marshall Altman

Matt Nathanson singles chronology
"Falling Apart" (2009)	"Faster" (2011)	"Room @ the End of the World" (2011)

"Faster" is a song by Matt Nathanson recorded for his album Modern Love. The song reached number seventy-four on the Billboard Hot 100 and number thirty-one on the Pop Songs chart also published by Billboard.(see charts)

== Charts ==
"Faster" debuted on the Bubbling Under Hot 100 at number twenty-four in its first charting week. It fell off the chart, but returned several weeks later at number ten. The week after that, it broke into the Billboard Hot 100 at number ninety-nine. It has since reached number seventy-four, becoming Matt Nathanson's second top 75 hit. After falling from number seventy-four to number eighty-five, due to many new entries from Lil Wayne's Tha Carter IV, and falling to number ninety-four within the next three weeks. It has rebounded to number eighty-five, where it stayed for an additional two weeks. It has since fallen off after 13 weeks on the chart.

=== Weekly charts ===
Chart (2011–12)	Peak position
Canada Hot 100 (Billboard)	88
US Billboard Hot 100	74
US Adult Contemporary (Billboard)	20
US Adult Pop Airplay (Billboard)	11
US Pop Airplay (Billboard)	31
US Hot Rock & Alternative Songs (Billboard)	44

=== Year-end charts ===
Chart (2011)	Position
US Adult Top 40 (Billboard)	32

== Release history ==
Release dates and formats for "Faster"
Region	Date	Format	Label(s)	Ref.
United States	June 28, 2011	Mainstream airplay	Capitol	
