= Jane Wattenberg =

American writer (born 1949)

- Born: Jane Wattenberg; 1949 (age 76–77); Norwalk, Connecticut
- Occupations: Artist, Writer, Illustrator
- Writing career
- Genres: Children's literature, photomontage
- Notable works: Mrs. Mustard's Baby Faces, Henny-Penny
- Website: www.janewattenberg.com

Jane Wattenberg (born 1949) is an American author, photographer, and illustrator of books for children. Mrs. Mustard is her pen name.

== Artistic career ==
Jane Wattenberg is the author and photo collage creator of the best-selling accordion-style baby board books, Mrs. Mustard's Baby Faces and Mrs. Mustard's Beastly Babies (Chronicle Books). She is also the author and photo illustrator of the award-winning re-told tale, Henny-Penny (Scholastic Press) and the retelling of the classic Aesop fable The Boy Who Cried Wolf, which she wove into Never Cry Woof! (Scholastic Press), wherein dogs guard the sheep instead of a boy.

Her most recent photo-illustrated book is The Duck and the Kangaroo, written by Edward Lear (1812–1888). It is the first stand-alone version of this endearing poem, which Lear wrote in the same time period as The Owl and the Pussycat.

Wattenberg is influenced by photo collage artist Hannah Höch, painter René Magritte, photographer Herbert Bayer and the 19th Century collage photographer Henry Peach Robinson as well as by animal photographers Ylla (Camilla Koffler) and Harry Whittier Frees. Tana Hoban has been another inspiration in the field of children's books as are Vladimir Radunsky and Maira Kalman.

At a young age, Wattenberg began photographing with a Brownie camera. Double exposed images from Brownie camera days influenced her future work. Her first published art photo was selected for publication in Rolling Stone in 1972 by Annie Leibovitz, who was photo editor at that time. She has illustrated book jackets for Judy Blume (Places I Never Meant to Be), Ellen Wittlinger (Razzle), Virginia Euwer Wolfe (Make Lemonade), Rachel Cohn (Gingerbread) and Joan Bauer (Thwonk) among others and album covers for Herbie Hancock (Mr Hands), Daniel Lenz, and The Aqua Velvets.

Before making books, Wattenberg's early photo collage work appeared in the Electric Company, Bananas and Dynamite magazines, the latter two edited in the 1970s by R.L. Stine (Goosebumps).

== Personal life ==
Jane Rachel Wattenberg was born (April 19, 1949) and raised in Norwalk, Connecticut. Her father was a chemist and amateur photographer. Her mother was an elementary school teacher dedicated to community service, family, and friends.

She maintains an urban farm in San Francisco, California where she lives with her husband, a psychoanalyst. They have three adult sons. Wattenberg is a beekeeper, harvesting honey. She raises hens, ducks, goats, as well as an occasional emu and quail.

== Education ==
Jane Wattenberg received a BA in Art History from Simmons College (1971) and an MFA in Photography from Rochester Institute of Technology (1973). In 1970 she studied art history in Vienna, Austria. She interned with Linda Shearer at the Guggenheim Museum, New York. From 1972 to 1973 she interned with Robert Sobieszek at the George Eastman House at the International Center for Photography, Rochester, New York. Wattenberg has studied with photographers John Pfahl, Betty Hahn, Bea Nettles, historian Robert Sobieszek, and children's book author Uri Schulevitz.

== Teaching ==
After graduating from Rochester Institute of Technology in 1973, Wattenberg moved to San Francisco where she taught photography classes at the San Francisco Museum of Modern Art and at the University of California San Francisco. At UCSF, Wattenberg taught classes in self-portraiture with photographer Mitchell Payne and performance artist Linda Montano. In 1976 she joined the photography faculty of Lone Mountain College alongside Greg MacGregor and Larry Sultan. Magnum photographer Jim Goldberg and photographer and museum director Arthur Ollman were among her students.

== Books ==
- The Duck and the Kangaroo Greenwillow/HarperCollins (2009)
- Never Cry Woof! A Dog-U-Drama Scholastic Press (2005)
- This is the Rain (Text by Lola Schaefer) HarperCollins/Greenwillow (2001)
- Henny-Penny Scholastic Press (2000)
- Mrs. Mustard's Name Games Chronicle Books (1993)
- Mrs. Mustard's Beastly Babies Chronicle Books (1990)
- Mrs. Mustard's Baby Faces Chronicle Books (1989, 2007)

== Publications ==
Maryann Owen, Librarian Racine Public Library, Wisconsin, "The Duck and the Kangaroo," School Library Journal, November 1, 2009

"Best of Baby Board Books," Booklist, 2005

Valerie Lewis and Walter Mayes, "Valerie and Walter's Best Books for Children," Collins, 2004 (This is the Rain, Mrs. Mustard's Baby Faces, Henny-Penny)

Sam Swope, "Once More Upon a Time," New York Times, May 14, 2000, (Henny-Penny)

Henny-Penny, Publishers Weekly, April 10, 2000

Ellen and Paul Kayser, et al., "Pick of the Lists," American Bookseller, March 1990, p. 51

Mrs. Mustard's Baby Faces, Publishers Weekly, October 13, 1989, p 51.

Steven Heller, "Passionate Collagists," Print Magazine, 1983

Judy Blume, Places I Never Meant to Be, Simon and Schuster, 2008

== Awards ==
Never Cry Woof!, Children's Choice Award (2006)

Henny-Penny, Best Book Choices, University of Wisconsin (2001)

Henny-Penny, Blue Ribbon Award for Best Books, Center for Children's Books, University of Illinois (2000)

Mrs. Mustard's Beastly Babies, American Bookseller's Pick of the Lists (1990)
