= Heart of Me (album) =

EP by Tim Urban
- Released: November 13, 2010 (iTunes)
- Recorded: September 2010
- Genre: Pop, rock
- Length: TBD
- Label: Independent

Tim Urban chronology
Heart of Me (2010)	New York Sessions (2014)

Singles from Heart of Me
- 1. "Heart of Me" Released: November 7, 2010

Heart of Me is the debut EP and album from American Idol Season 9 Top 7 finalist, and singer Tim Urban. The full album was released on November 13, 2010 to iTunes with all the songs together. Hard copies of the album were released online via Tim's official online store for a limited time.

== Background ==
Starting on November 8, 2010, one song off the EP was released per day in iTunes starting with Heart of Me. The song I and You premiered in a live chat with Urban at Ainow.org on November 7, 2010.

== Promotion ==
Urban announced that he will be working on booking shows to promote the EP. On November 7, 2010 during a live chat with Urban, he stated that he will be on "FOX Dallas Morning News" where he will be performing a few songs from the EP on November 8, 2010. He ended up playing the title tack Heart of Me on November 8, 2010 at "FOX Dallas Morning News".

== Singles ==
- Heart of Me is the first single off the EP. It is also the title track. Its first listen was on NeonLimelight.com on November 7, 2010. On the same day, he stated at Ainow.org that he wants to film a music video for the single and is figuring out the details. However, a video was never made and Urban has started work on his full-length debut album.
- "Wheels touch down" was the second single off the EP, it came out on November 9, 2010 Via. iTunes.
- "I and You" was the third single off the EP, it came out on November 10, 2010 Via. iTunes.
- "P.S." was the fourth single off the EP, it came out on November 11, 2010 Via. iTunes.
- "Lullaby" was the fifth single off the EP, it came out on November 12, 2010 Via. iTunes.
- "Blur" was the sixth single off the EP, it came out on November 13, 2010 Via. iTunes.

== Track listing ==
#	Title	Note
1	"Heart of Me"	On iTunes on Nov. 8, 2010
2	"P.S"	On iTunes on Nov. 11, 2010
3	"Blur"	On iTunes on Nov. 13, 2010
4	"Lullaby"	On iTunes on Nov. 12, 2010
5	"Wheels Touch Down"	On iTunes on Nov. 9, 2010
6	"I and You"	On iTunes on Nov. 10, 2010

- All songs were written by Urban.

== Critical reception ==
Mark Franklin of The York Dispatch's blog, Idol Chatter gave the album a C and wrote that it "shows promise and allows a very pleasant voice to shine through." He singled out "P.S." and "Blur" as highlights. Although he considered the lyrics to "P.S." cliche, he called the song "catchy" and "radio ready", while he wrote that "Blur" grew on him "with repeated listens". He was less favorable of "Lullaby" however, calling the version on Urban's Myspace page "beautiful in its simplicity", but criticizing the version included on the album for having too much "clutter".
