= Come On Get Higher =

2008 single by Matt Nathanson

Single by Matt Nathanson

from the album Some Mad Hope
- Released: February 11, 2008
- Genre: Pop rock, alternative rock
- Length: 3:34
- Label: Vanguard
- Songwriters: Matt Nathanson, Mark Weinberg
- Producers: Marshall Altman, Mark Weinberg

Matt Nathanson singles chronology
"Car Crash" (2007)	"Come On Get Higher" (2008)	"All We Are" (2009)

"Come On Get Higher" is a song co-written by Matt Nathanson and Mark Weinberg. It was recorded by Nathanson and released as the second single from his album Some Mad Hope in 2008. The song had commercial success, reaching the Billboard Hot 100 at number 59 as well as charting within the Top 10 of Billboard's Adult Contemporary and Adult Pop Songs charts. In addition, it is his only single to date to receive a platinum certification from the RIAA.

The song has been covered by many artists, including country music duo Sugarland, whose live version of the song appears on the Deluxe Edition of their album Love on the Inside.

== Chart performance ==
=== Weekly charts ===
Chart (2008–09)	Peak position
Canada Hot 100 (Billboard)	30
Canada AC (Billboard)	2
Canada Hot AC (Billboard)	11
US Billboard Hot 100	59
US Adult Alternative Airplay (Billboard)	3
US Adult Contemporary (Billboard)	3
US Adult Pop Airplay (Billboard)	9
US Pop Airplay (Billboard)	20

=== Year-end charts ===
Chart (2008)	Position
US Adult Top 40 (Billboard)	31
Chart (2009)	Position
US Adult Contemporary (Billboard)	11
Chart (2010)	Position
US Adult Contemporary (Billboard)	25

== Certifications ==
Region	Certification	Certified units/sales
Canada (Music Canada)	Gold	40,000^{*}
New Zealand (RMNZ)	Gold	15,000^{‡}
United States (RIAA)	3× Platinum	3,000,000^{‡}
^{*} Sales figures based on certification alone.^{‡} Sales+streaming figures based on certification alone.
