= Cesar Chavez Street =

United States street in San Francisco

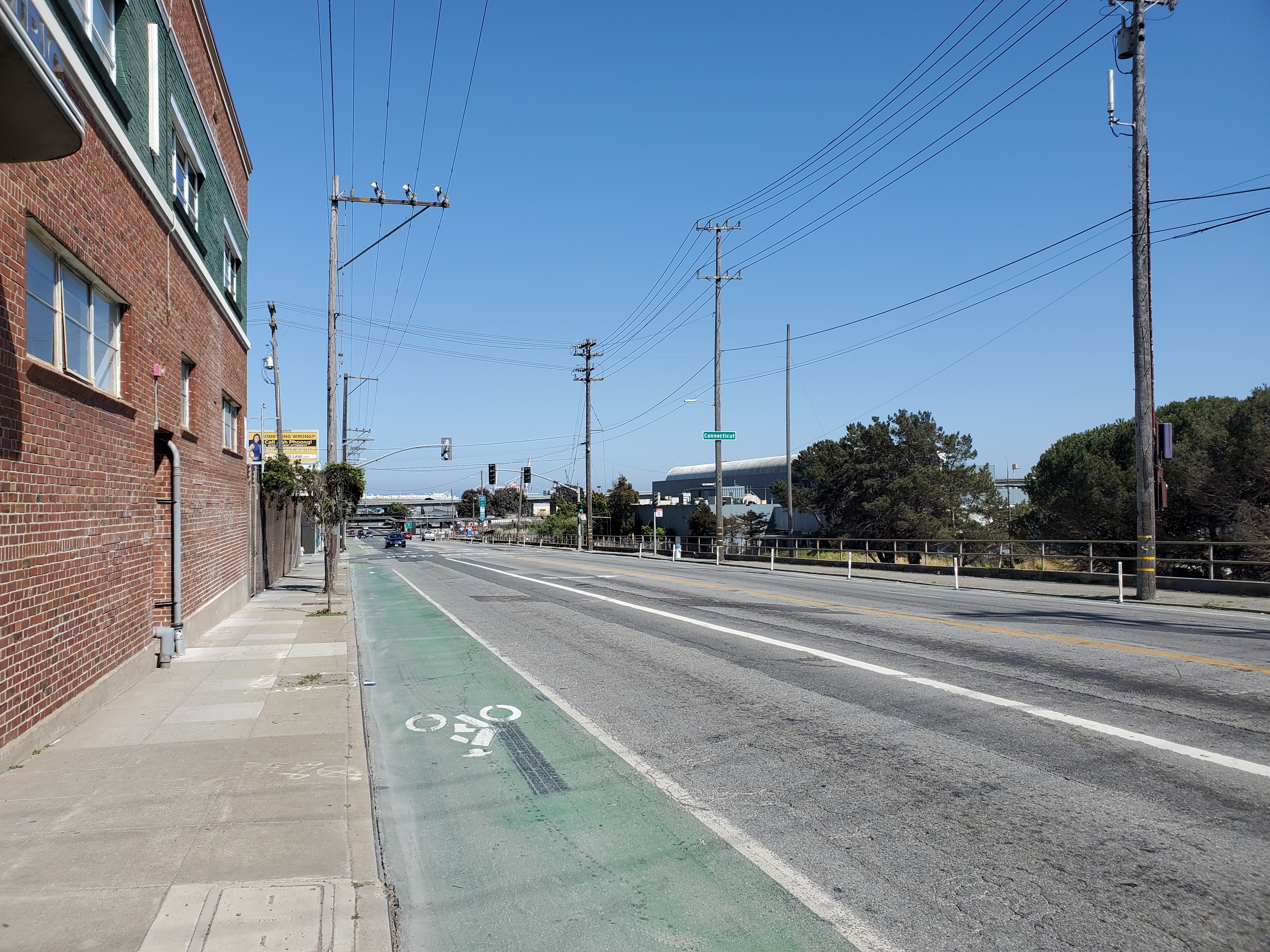
- Cesar Chavez Street south of Potrero Hill
- Namesake: Cesar Chavez
- Length: 3.1 mi (5.0 km)
- Major junctions: Douglass Street in the Noe Valley; US 101 in Cathedral Hill; I-280 near Islais Creek; Pier 80 in the Bayview neighborhood

Construction
- Inauguration: March 31, 1995

Cesar Chavez Street (formerly Army Street) is an east–west street in San Francisco, California, United States. The street was renamed in 1995 in honor of American labor leader and Latino American civil rights activist, Cesar Chavez. It was widened in the middle of the 20th century to serve as a thoroughfare between the 101 and 280 freeways to the unbuilt Mission Freeway.

It starts at Pier 80 in the Bayview neighborhood and ends at Douglass Street in the Noe Valley neighborhood. The intersection of Chavez and Mission is the heart of the micro-neighborhood locally known as "La Lengua."

The chase scene from the 1968 Steve McQueen film Bullitt started on what was then Army Street.

== History ==
Originally the street ran alongside the Precita Creek, parallel to Navy Street. Around 1900 the creek was channeled underground, and Army Street was paved over the former creek.

In the 1930s it was widened and meant to be a thoroughfare for automobiles. It is seen as the dividing line between the Mission District on the north, and Bernal Heights on the south. At one point it was a two-lane street with its own streetcar line, but had been widened to six lanes by 1950.

It is considered an important east–west arterial, "... west of Third Street, [the street] is designated a major arterial and a Citywide Bicycle Route and carries 12,000 vehicles per day. It is a four-lane street that provides access to the west and connects to the central waterfront, India Basin, and Hunters Point Shipyard areas to the east. East of Third Street, it provides access to Pier 80."

The widening of Army Street was made as part of the development of the never constructed Southern Crossing from San Francisco to the East Bay.

The name of the street was changed to honor the city's Latino community, but the change was controversial at the time. Following the name change in January 1995, residents of the largely-white Noe Valley neighborhood on the thoroughfare's western stretch organized a ballot initiative (Proposition O) that November to remove Chavez's name from street signs. They argued that the name Army Street had important historical value, that the name change had become a divisive issue for the city, and lamented the costs associated with changing the name on business promotional material and other documentation. The name change enjoyed popularity in the Mission District, as an important symbol of recognition for the local Latino population. The conflict drew national attention, with elected officials from around the country endorsing a vote to keep the Chavez name.

Recognizing the negative effects created by the widening of the street, in 2011 the city started an effort to make the street more pedestrian friendly. The Cesar Chavez Streetscape Project implemented measures to "improve pedestrian and bicyclist safety, enhance greening, promote ecology function, and make the street work better ..."

In March 2026, following sexual abuse allegations made against Chavez, San Francisco city supervisor Jackie Fielder stated that she would support any community effort to remove Chavez's name. Former city supervisor Susan Leal, who previously led the 1995 name change, agreed that Chavez's name should be taken down. Las Campesinas Street was proposed in October.

== See also ==
- List of places named after Cesar Chavez
