= Beneath These Fireworks =

2003 album by Matt Nathanson

Studio album by Matt Nathanson
- Released: October 14, 2003
- Genres: Rock, pop, acoustic
- Labels: Universal Records; Acrobat Records
- Producer: Ron Aniello

Matt Nathanson chronology
Still Waiting for Spring (1999)	Beneath These Fireworks (2003)	Some Mad Hope (2007)

Professional ratings
Review scores
Source	Rating
Rolling Stone	favorable

Beneath These Fireworks is the major label debut and fifth album by Matt Nathanson, released on October 14, 2003 on Universal Records. Shortly after its release, Nathanson was dropped from Universal thus causing the album to go mostly unnoticed.

== Track listing ==
All songs written by Matt Nathanson/Mark Weinberg except where noted.

1. "Angel" – 1:32
2. "Suspended" (Nathanson/Weinberg/Eric Bazilian) – 3:09
3. "Sad Songs" – 3:53
4. "I Saw" – 3:54
5. "Bare" – 3:05
6. "Little Victories" (Nathanson) – 2:38
7. "Pretty the World" – 3:07
8. "Curve of the Earth" – 3:29
9. "Bent" – 3:51
10. "Lucky Boy" – 4:10
11. "Weight of It All" (Nathanson) – 3:14
12. "Sing Me Sweet" – 4:06

== Personnel ==
- Matt Nathanson – vocals, background vocals, acoustic guitar, electric guitar
- David Garza – electric guitar, nylon string guitar, piano
- Ron Aniello – electric guitar, acoustic guitar, keyboards
- Sergio Andrade – bass
- Matt Chamberlain – drums, loops, percussion
- Jamie Muhoberac – keyboards, piano
- Matt Fish – cello
- Gunter Fliszar – percussion
- Glen Phillips – background vocals on "Pretty the World" and "Sad Songs"
- Mark Weinberg – bass on "Pretty the World" and "Sing Me Sweet"
- Emm Gryner – background vocals on "Sing Me Sweet"
- Marcus Barone – conductor on "Little Victories"
