= Ernst (album) =

Studio album by Matt Nathanson
- Released: February 1997
- Genre: Rock, pop, acoustic
- Label: Acrobat Records

Matt Nathanson chronology
Please (1993)	Ernst (1997)	Not Colored Too Perfect (1998)

Ernst is the second album by Matt Nathanson. It was released in February 1997 on Acrobat Records.

== Track listing ==
1. "First Time" – 4:00
2. "Church Clothes" – 3:03
3. "We'll Recover" – 3:12
4. "Measure for Measure" – 3:19
5. "New Coats and New Hats" – 3:07
6. "All Been Said Before" – 3:11
7. "Wide Eyed and Full" – 3:51
8. "Miracles" – 3:58
9. "Somewhere to Hide" – 3:15
10. "Maid" – 4:28
