= Not Colored Too Perfect =

Studio album by Matt Nathanson
- Released: April 1998
- Genre: Rock, pop, acoustic
- Label: Acrobat Records

Matt Nathanson chronology
Ernst (1997)	Not Colored Too Perfect (1998)	Still Waiting for Spring (1999)

Not Colored Too Perfect is the third album by Matt Nathanson, released in April 1998 on Acrobat Records.

== Track listing ==
1. "All Been Said Before" – 3:01
2. "Church Clothes" – 2:58
3. "New Coats and New Hats" – 3:39
4. "Wait Up" – 3:56
5. "You're Smiling" – 3:29
6. "Miracles" – 4:16
7. "Clean" – 3:04
8. "Somewhere to Hide" – 3:24
9. "Vandalized" – 3:26
10. "Trace of a Cat's Eye" – 1:06
