= Some Mad Hope =

Studio album by Matt Nathanson
- Released: August 14, 2007
- Genres: Rock, pop, acoustic
- Labels: Vanguard Records; Acrobat Records
- Producers: Marshall Altman, Mark Weinberg

Matt Nathanson chronology
Beneath These Fireworks (2003)	Some Mad Hope (2007)	Modern Love (2011)

Professional ratings
Review scores
Source	Rating
AllMusic	3/5 stars
IGN	7.9/10
Alternative Addiction	4.5/5 stars

Some Mad Hope is the sixth studio album by American singer-songwriter Matt Nathanson, released on August 14, 2007, on Vanguard Records. It peaked on the Billboard 200 at #60, and peaked at 3 on the Top Independent Albums. Some Mad Hope was Nathanson's first album for Vanguard Records, and contained two singles that became AAA airplay staples, "Car Crash" and "Come On Get Higher". In September 2008, Vanguard Records announced "All We Are" and "To the Beat of Our Noisy Hearts" as future singles. The city skyline that's featured on the album's cover is that of Los Angeles.

As of August 2016, the album has sold 500,000 copies. "Come On Get Higher" was certified 2x Multi-Platinum on September 16, 2016.

The "Car Crash" song is also a sample song on Philips GoGear RaGa.

== Track listing ==
All tracks are written by Matt Nathanson and Mark Weinberg, except where noted.

No.	Title	Length
1.	"Car Crash"	3:28
2.	"Come On Get Higher"	3:34
3.	"Heartbreak World"	3:27
4.	"Gone"	3:31
5.	"Wedding Dress"	3:54
6.	"Bulletproof Weeks" (Nathanson, Troy Verges)	4:01
7.	"To the Beat of Our Noisy Hearts"	3:01
8.	"Still"	3:51
9.	"Detroit Waves"	3:13
10.	"Falling Apart"	3:28
11.	"Sooner Surrender"	4:29
12.	"All We Are" (Nathanson and Marshall Altman)	3:36

== Personnel ==
- Matt Nathanson – vocals, guitar
- John Thomasson – electric and string bass
- Aaron Tap – guitar
- Jason McGerr – drums, percussion (tracks 2, 4, 7, 8, 12)
- Jason McKenzie – drums, percussion (tracks 1, 3, 5, 9, 10, 11)
- Jim McGorman – guitar (tracks 1, 3, 5, 9, 11), keys (3, 5, 11), background vocals on track 1
- Michael Chaves – guitar (tracks 2, 4, 7, 8, 10, 12)
- Ben West – piano, keys (tracks 2, 4, 6, 7, 8, 12)
- Suzie McNeil – background vocals on tracks 6 & 11
- Marshall Altman – percussion, background vocals (tracks 3, 4, 5, 7, 8, 9, 10, 11, 12)
- Mark Weinberg – electric guitar (tracks 9 & 10)
