= Still Waiting for Spring =

Studio album by Matt Nathanson
- Released: March 1999
- Genre: Rock, pop, acoustic
- Label: Acrobat Records

Matt Nathanson chronology
Not Colored Too Perfect (1998)	Still Waiting for Spring (1999)	Beneath These Fireworks (2003)

Still Waiting for Spring is the fourth album by Matt Nathanson, released in March 1999 on Acrobat Records. It is the last independent release by Nathanson; he would later sign to Universal Records.

== Track listing ==
1. "Parade" – 0:33
2. "Wings" – 2:53
3. "Lucky Boy" – 3:25
4. "Loud" – 3:44
5. "Answering Machine" – 3:50
6. "Then I'll Be Smiling" – 2:58
7. "More Than This" – 3:26
8. "Everything You Say Sounds Like Gospel" – 3:06
9. "Amazing Again" – 3:45
10. "Little Victories" – 2:35
