= Modern Love (Matt Nathanson album) =

Studio album by Matt Nathanson
- Released: June 21, 2011
- Genre: Pop rock
- Length: 41:23
- Label: Vanguard / Acrobat
- Producer: Mark Weinberg, Matt Nathanson, Marshall Altman

Matt Nathanson chronology
Some Mad Hope (2007)	Modern Love (2011)	Last of the Great Pretenders (2013)

Singles from Faster
- 1. "Faster" Released: March 29, 2011; 2. "Room @ the End of the World" Released: September 2011; 3. "Run" Released: November 9, 2011; 4. "Modern Love" Released: April 2012

Modern Love is the seventh studio album by American singer-songwriter Matt Nathanson. It was released on June 21, 2011. Modern Love was Nathanson's second album for Vanguard Records, following his 2007 album Some Mad Hope. He released the first single, "Faster", as a free download to his fan mailing list in March 2011. Modern Love debuted at number 17 on the Billboard 200 for the week of July 9, 2011.

== Critical reception ==
Professional ratings
Aggregate scores
Source	Rating
Metacritic	(72/100)
Review scores
Source	Rating
AllMusic	3/5 stars
Entertainment Weekly	B−
PopMatters	8/10 stars
Roughstock	4/5 stars
Uncut	(positive)

Modern Love received positive reviews from music critics. On Metacritic, which assigns a normalized rating out of 100 to reviews from mainstream critics, the album received an average score of 72, based on 4 reviews.

Jedd Beaudoin of PopMatters called it "the closest a pop album comes to perfection this year", giving high praise to the track listing for being an amalgam of late 80s to early 90s pop music and balancing both its ballads and upbeat tracks, concluding that it will have "a long and positive legacy, one that can be appreciated by a broad audience if only that audience can listen without prejudice." AllMusic editor Andrew Leahey commended Nathanson for making a consistent project that puts a polished sheen into his signature musicianship from the previous record but found it overall to be "almost meticulously inoffensive," concluding that its "both the blessing and the curse of this album, which charts a steady path but offers few surprises as a result."

== Track listing ==
All tracks are written by Matt Nathanson and Mark Weinberg except as noted.

No.	Title	Writer(s)	Length
1.	"Faster"		3:28
2.	"Modern Love"		3:32
3.	"Love Comes Tumbling Down"		4:40
4.	"Room @ the End of the World"		4:08
5.	"Kiss Quick"		4:26
6.	"Mercy"		3:09
7.	"Kept"		3:21
8.	"Run" (featuring Jennifer Nettles and Kristian Bush)	Nathanson, Jennifer Nettles, Kristian Bush	4:09
9.	"Queen of (K)nots"		4:10
10.	"Drop to Hold You"		3:39
11.	"Bottom of the Sea"		2:46

== Personnel ==
Musicians

- Matt Nathanson - Lead & Background Vocals, Acoustic & Electric Guitar
- Zac Rae - Drum Programming, Keyboards, Baritone Ukulele, Glockenspiel, Guitar, Drums, Percussion
- Ben West - Piano, Keyboards
- Rainman - Drum Programming, Piano, Keyboards, Synths
- Brandon Bush - Piano, Keyboards, Wurlitzer
- Aaron Tap - Acoustic & Electric Guitar, Background Vocals
- Michael Chaves - Acoustic & Electric Guitar, Nylon String Guitar
- David Levita - Acoustic & Electric Guitar, Lap Steel Guitar
- John Thomasson - Bass Guitar, Upright Bass
- Curt Schnieder, Tim Smith - Bass Guitar
- Jason McGerr, Aaron Sterling, Shannon Forrest - Drums, Percussion

Horn Section

- Danny T. Levin - Trumpet, Flugelhorn, Alto Horn, Trombone, Euphonium
- David Moyer - Tenor & Baritone Sax, Bass Clarinet, Bassoon
- Chris Miller - Tuba

Group Vocals

- Zac Rae, Michael Chaves, Mark Weinberg, Matt Nathanson - The "Mercy" Clap Choir
- Ayappa Biddanda, Isaac Johnson, Paul Doucette, Aaron Tap, Matt Nathanson - The "Modern Love" Choir

"Run" Featured Artists

- Jennifer Nettles - Lead & Background Vocals
- Kristian Bush - Acoustic & Electric Guitar, Background Vocals

== Charts ==
=== Weekly charts ===
Chart (2011)	Peak position
US Billboard 200	17
US Independent Albums (Billboard)	4
US Top Rock Albums (Billboard)	4

=== Year-end charts ===
Chart (2011)	Position
US Independent Albums (Billboard)	43
