= Matt Nathanson =

American musician (born 1973)

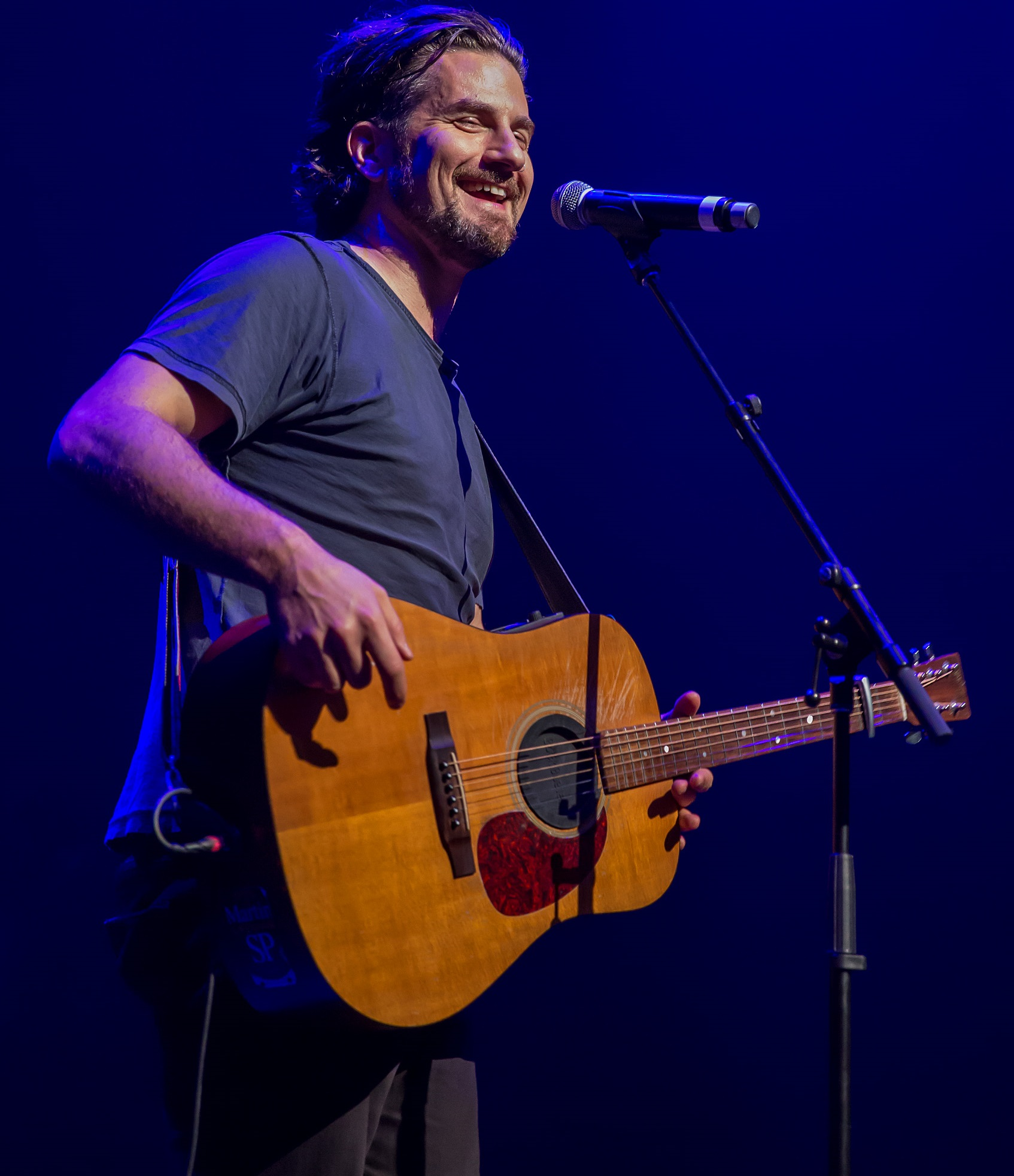
- Matt performing in 2014

Background information
- Born: Matthew Adam Nathanson; March 28, 1973 (age 53)
- Origin: Lexington, Massachusetts, U.S.
- Genres: Rock, folk rock, pop rock, alternative rock
- Occupation: Singer-songwriter
- Instruments: Vocals, guitar
- Years active: 1993–present
- Labels: Acrobat, Universal, Vanguard
- Website: Mattnathanson.com

Matthew Adam Nathanson (born March 28, 1973) is an American singer-songwriter whose work is a blend of folk and rock and roll music. In addition to singing, he plays acoustic (sometimes a 12-string) and electric guitar, and has played both solo and with a full band. His work includes the platinum-selling song "Come On Get Higher". One of his hit songs, "Giants", was the opening music for the 2016 World Series of Poker in Las Vegas on ESPN.

== Early life and college years ==
Nathanson was raised in Lexington, Massachusetts and attended Proctor Academy in Andover, New Hampshire. His father is Jewish and his mother is Catholic. Nathanson attended Pitzer College in Claremont, California (majoring in English and World Literature). Matt attended the Fessenden School in West Newton, Massachusetts along with his brother, Neal, prior to going to high school at Proctor Academy. Despite living close by in Lexington, the two boarded at Fessenden during the week before going home for weekends.

== Music ==
The members of his band have included Aben Eubanks on guitar, keys, and vocals, who left to join Kelly Clarkson and was later replaced by Aaron Tap. John Thomasson began as bassist in 2004. Thomasson left in 2009 to play bass for Little Big Town and continues to play for them today. Jason McKenzie was on drums until Fall 2006; Nick Amoroso on two tours from fall 2007 through Winter 2008. Konrad Meissner is the drummer. Before 2005, Nathanson was often accompanied by cellist Matt Fish.

Current touring band, as of late 2014: Aaron Tap (guitar, back-up vocals, artistic director), Chris Lovejoy (percussion), and Shiben Bhattacharya (bass).

=== Television ===
His album Some Mad Hope was released on August 14, 2007. The song "All We Are" was featured on the television series NCIS in the fifth-season episode "Family", the first season Private Practice episode "In Which Charlotte Goes Down the Rabbit Hole", the One Tree Hill episodes "My Way Home is Through You" and "Forever and Almost Always". He was also featured on Women's Murder Club.

The ABC show Big Shots featured his song "Come On Get Higher", and the song "I Saw" was featured on Scrubs in the sixth-season episode "My Best Friend's Baby's Baby and My Baby's Baby". Nathanson's song "Little Victories" was used on the Season 7 episode of Scrubs, "My Dumb Luck". On January 30, 2008, Nathanson and his band performed "Car Crash" on Late Night with Conan O'Brien. His song "Sooner Surrender" was used on the May 28, 2008 episode of Men in Trees, "New Dog, Old Tricks". Nathanson and his band performed "Come On Get Higher" on The Late Late Show with Craig Ferguson on December 22, 2008. The CW show Privileged featured his song "All We Are", "Family Ties" and Life Unexpected in second-season episode titled "Parents Unemployed". His song "Bulletproof Weeks" appeared in the episode "Another Second Chance" of the TV series Private Practice on January 14, 2010.

On February 13, 2009, Nathanson and his band performed "Come On Get Higher" on the Late Show with David Letterman. On March 3, 2009, he performed on The Ellen DeGeneres Show, singing "Come On Get Higher".

In March 2009, Nathanson was the special guest for Episode 17 of Live From Daryl's House, Daryl Hall's monthly Internet concert. They, along with Hall's house band, performed (among other songs) "Car Crash", "Come On Get Higher", "Still", and "All We Are", as well as Hall & Oates classics "Did It in a Minute" and "One on One". Matt Nathanson's "Come On Get Higher" is featured on the CD "Circle of Friends – Dave FM: Volume 2", an Atlanta-based radio station.

Matt Nathanson appeared on the hit show The Bachelor (U.S. TV series) (season 16), where he serenaded bachelor Ben Flajnik and runner-up Lindzi Cox with his hit "Faster".

"Kiss Quick" was featured on One Tree Hill season 8 episode 22.

On July 9, 2013, Nathanson and his band performed his single "Mission Bells" on the Jay Leno Show.

Nathanson wore a That Metal Show (TMS) T-shirt during his The Tonight Show with Jay Leno appearance and as a result he was invited to appear on Season 13 Episode 5 of That Metal Show along with Myles Kennedy and Mark Tremonti from the band Alter Bridge.

On February 14, 2016, Nathanson again appeared on The Bachelor (U.S. TV series) for the "Bachelor At 20" special. He serenaded Bachelor in Paradise (season 2) winners Jade Roper and Tanner Tolbert at their wedding with his song, "Bill Murray". Nathanson has said that "Bill Murray" is the linchpin for his latest album Show Me Your Fangs and his favorite song that he has ever written.

=== Covers ===
Matt Nathanson's cover of "Laid" by Manchester band James was featured on the American Wedding soundtrack, as well as American Pie Presents Band Camp. Nathanson also covered the Prince song "Starfish & Coffee" for the children's album For The Kids Too. Matt also performed a cover of Cat Stevens's "The Wind" for the album Wake Up Everybody, and "I Hope That Something Better Comes Along" by The Muppets for Muppets: The Green Album. In 2018, Nathanson released an EP with 6 Def Leppard covers entitled Pyromattia. Selections include "Pour Some Sugar On Me", "Hysteria" and "Promises". Nathanson covered Radiohead's "Fake Plastic Trees" and Bruce Springsteen's "Thunder Road" on his 2020 live album Live in Paradise: Boston. In 2021, Nathanson released a full cover album titled "Achtung Matty," a recreation of U2's 1991 Achtung Baby, which Nathanson cites as his "favorite record of all time."

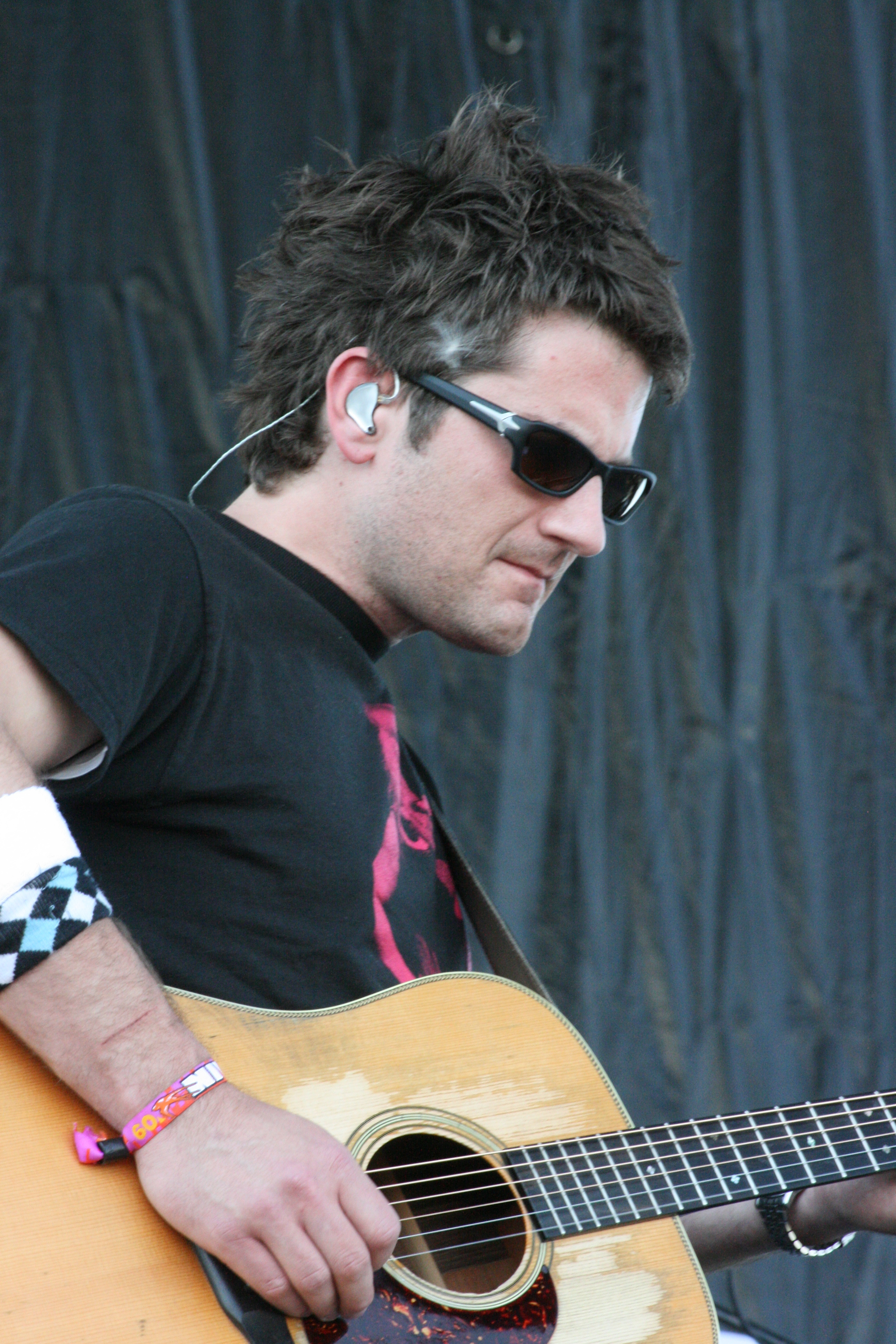
Matt Nathanson performing in 2009

== Albums and EPs ==
=== Please ===
Recorded and mixed in February/March 1993 in a house in Van Nuys, California. Most of the songs were written while Nathanson was in high school and a freshman at Pitzer College in Claremont, CA. Before this, Nathanson had recorded only demos. This was his first collection of songs ever put on CD. Please was released in the spring of 1993.

=== Ernst ===
Recorded in San Francisco in the winter of 1997. An entirely acoustic record, the instrumentation is mostly acoustic guitar with some accordion, cellos and percussion. This record was mixed at Toast Studios in San Francisco, by Jaquire King.

=== Not Colored Too Perfect ===
This record is a compilation of unreleased material, the bulk of which was recorded in San Rafael, CA in the fall of 1997. Two other songs on this compilation, "You're Smiling" and "Wait Up" were recorded in Santa Barbara, CA in the summer of 1995. The final two songs, "Trace of a Cat's Eye" and "Vandalized" were taken from the unreleased record by Nathanson's college band Here Comes Everybody. The HCE album was recorded in Claremont, CA, in the spring of 1995 but was never released. Both these songs were written by the drummer in the band, Bill Foreman.

=== Still Waiting for Spring ===
Recorded December 1998 in Cotati, CA. and January 1999 at Tiny Telephone Studios in San Francisco, with Mark Weinberg. This record features David Immergluck & Charlie Gillingham of Counting Crows on tracks including the song "Loud", which was featured on the television show Dawson's Creek. The record was mixed at Different Fur in San Francisco and released spring of 1999.

=== When Everything Meant Everything ===
Recorded in the Winter of 2002, at Trakworx in South San Francisco. An entire album of songs was recorded but the release was shortened to an EP when Nathanson signed to Universal Records halfway through the mixing process. Studio versions of "Princess" and "Fall to Pieces" appear only on this EP. It was produced by Mark Weinberg and Nathanson and released in the fall of 2002.

=== Beneath These Fireworks ===
Recorded in Los Angeles in the winter of 2003, the team included drummer Matt Chamberlain, guitar player David Garza, and Glen Phillips of the band Toad The Wet Sprocket for background vocals. "Lucky Boy", from Still Waiting for Spring was re-recorded for this record, as were most of the songs from the When Everything Meant Everything EP/sessions. It was mixed by Mark Endert in Los Angeles and released on October 14, 2003. "Suspended" and "I Saw" were released as singles, and more than half the record was licensed to television shows like Scrubs, Tarzan, One Tree Hill, Joan of Arcadia, and Men in Trees.

=== At the Point ===
Upon deciding that the major label world was not for him, Nathanson got out of his contract with Universal Records and released "At the Point." Recorded live over the course of 3 nights at The Point in Bryn Mawr, PA in June 2005, it was Nathanson's only live album until his 2020 release Live in Paradise: Boston. This record was released in April 2006 and debuted at No. 29 on the Billboard Heatseekers chart the week of its release.

=== Some Mad Hope ===
Some Mad Hope was recorded between August 2005 and March 2007 in Los Angeles, San Francisco and Cotati, CA. The album was made independently, and Nathanson partnered with Vanguard Records for its release in August 2007. It debuted at No. 60 on the Billboard Top 200 and was on the charts for 34 weeks. Various songs on the record were placed on television shows, including CSI, One Tree Hill, Private Practice, Melrose Place, 90210, Vampire Diaries, and American Idol.

Singles included "Come On Get Higher" (peaked at No. 2 at Triple A, No. 9 at Hot AC, No. 3 at Mainstream AC and No. 19 at Pop), "Car Crash" (peaked at No. 12 at Triple A, and No. 29 at Hot AC), "Falling Apart" (peaked No. 29 at Hot AC), and "All We Are" (peaked at No. 26 at Triple A).

Some Mad Hope has sold over 300,000 copies, and "Come On Get Higher" went platinum, selling over 1.8 million in single sales.

=== Modern Love ===
Nathanson's album Modern Love was released on June 21, 2011. The first single, "Faster", was released in March. In addition to the second single with Sugarland, "Run", the album's title track "Modern Love" reached the top 15 on the MusicBase Adult Album Alternative chart in September 2012 due to considerable airplay on AAA formatted radio stations. Nathanson was the opening act on select dates for Kelly Clarkson's Stronger Tour January 13, 2012 to April 10, 2012.

In an interview with Broken Records Magazine, Nathanson said Modern Love was a "powerful record" and that he aimed to model its sound and production after his favorite 80's bands and songs.

=== Last of the Great Pretenders ===
Nathanson's album Last of the Great Pretenders was released in the U.S. on July 16, 2013. The first single, "Mission Bells", was released on March 11 on San Francisco's radio station KFOG. The album debuted at No. 16 on the Billboard Top 200. Nathanson announced his North American tour, Last of the Great Pretenders Tour, with special guest Joshua Radin through his personal webpage. The tour kicked off in Portland, Oregon on September 20 and ended in Austin, Texas on November 23, with 45 dates total.

In a statement to his fans, Nathanson said they should expect, "new songs, new stories, a white Bengal tiger and confetti cannons (ok, not the last two)." The next single to be released was "Kinks Shirt".

=== Show Me Your Fangs ===
Nathanson on May 21, 2015 at Sleep Train Amphitheatre at Sacramento in Marysville, CA

Nathanson's ninth studio album, Show Me Your Fangs, was released in the U.S. on October 2, 2015. The first single, "Headphones", featuring Lolo was released in June 2014. For the video, Nathanson joined Starkey Hearing Technologies in Peru to help people with hearing loss. Following the release of "Headphones", Nathanson went on a two-month stateside co-headlining tour with his longtime friend Gavin DeGraw. In May 2015, the next single "Gold in the Summertime", was released and Nathanson headed out on a nationwide tour with Train and The Fray. The tour kicked off on May 21 at Sleep Train Amphitheatre at Sacramento in Marysville CA, with shows throughout the U.S. The tour wrapped up on July 25 at Gorge Amphitheatre in Quincy, Wash. "Giants", the third single off the newest album, was released in August 2015. "Giants" was used as the theme song for the 2016 World Series of Poker on ESPN. The "Show Me Your Fangs Acoustic Tour - an evening with Matt Nathanson" kicked off September 21 at the Brighton Music Hall in Boston and ended in San Diego at the Casbah on October 30.

=== Pyromattia ===
Matt Nathanson released an EP of Def Leppard covers titled Pyromattia in the U.S. on Friday, June 8, 2018. The title is a play on Def Leppard's 1983 album Pyromania. Pyromattia features songs from that album as well as 1981's High 'N' Dry, 1987's Hysteria, and 1999's Euphoria. In an interview with Billboard, Nathanson said that Def Leppard singer Joe Elliott liked the album, specifically commenting about his cover of "Stage Fright". In a post on Facebook, Nathanson indicated he was a lifelong Def Leppard fan. In that same post, he also teased a forthcoming album of original material, but gave no details.

=== Sings His Sad Heart ===
On October 5, 2018, Nathanson released his tenth studio album, Sings His Sad Heart. Before the album's release, two songs were premiered on YouTube along with the album announcement: "Used to Be" and "Mine".

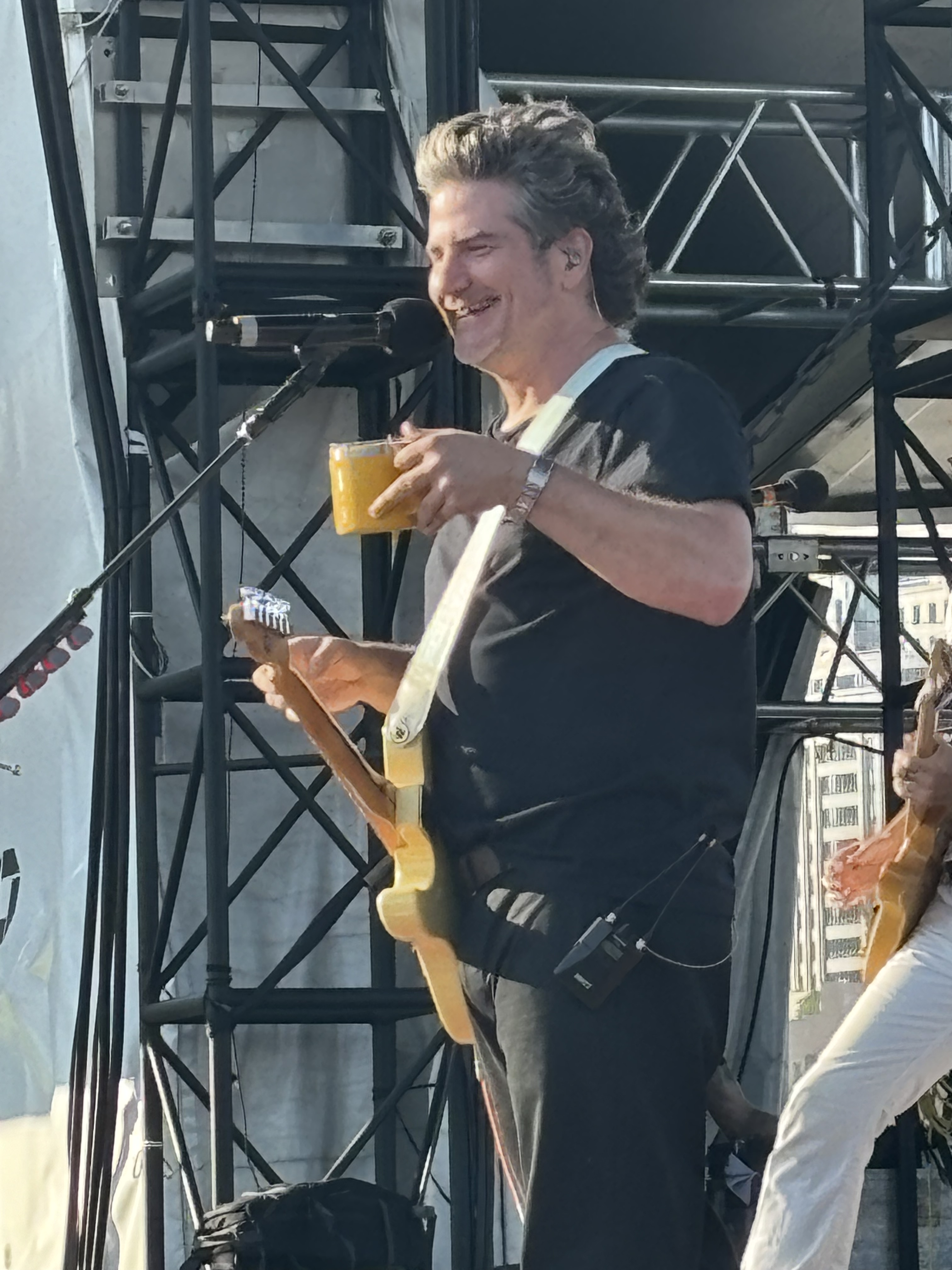
Matt Nathanson takes a break during the Help From My Friends tour to drink some green tea at Pier 17 in New York City on July 30, 2024. The tour featured Nathanson, Blue October and Switchfoot.

=== Postcards (from Chicago) ===
Matt Nathanson released an EP, on July 26, 2019, as a digital download and a limited edition vinyl. It contains six new recordings. Two were collaborations, one with recording artist Richard Marx, the other with Patrick Stump.

=== Live in Paradise: Boston ===
On July 24, 2020, Matt Nathanson released his second live album. The album contains 61 tracks with songs and stories taken primarily from Boston shows at the Paradise Rock Club on Nathanson's 2019 “song wheel” tour. The setlist for each show was different with audience members spinning a large wheel of songs on stage to randomly choose songs.

=== Boston Accent ===
On July 29, 2022, Nathanson released his 12th studio album, Boston Accent. Produced by Butch Walker, the album is "about being jealous of the cool kids who got to spend their summers on Nantucket and Martha's Vineyard. It's about how the hint of a Boston accent can make me drop my guard and feel connected to a complete stranger." Nathanson noted in an interview that he left his native Massachusetts at age 18 for California and "never looked back..."

== Discography ==
- Please (1993)
- Ernst (1997)
- Not Colored Too Perfect (1998)
- Still Waiting for Spring (1999)
- Beneath These Fireworks (2003)
- Some Mad Hope (2007)
- Modern Love (2011)
- Last of the Great Pretenders (2013)
- Show Me Your Fangs (2015)
- Sings His Sad Heart (2018)
- Farewell December (2020)
- Achtung Matty (2021)
- Boston Accent (2022)
- King Of (Un)Simple (2025)

== Music videos ==
Year	Video	Director
2008	"Come On Get Higher"	
2012	"Run" (w/Sugarland)	Valarie Allyn Bieans
2013	"Mission Bells"	Marc Ripper / Fort Ripper
2013	"Kinks Shirt"	Bobcat Goldthwait
2014	"Headphones"	Brendan Walter and Mel Soria
2015	"Gold in the Summertime"	SCANTRON FILMS
2016	"Adrenaline"	2wenty
