= Sugarland discography =

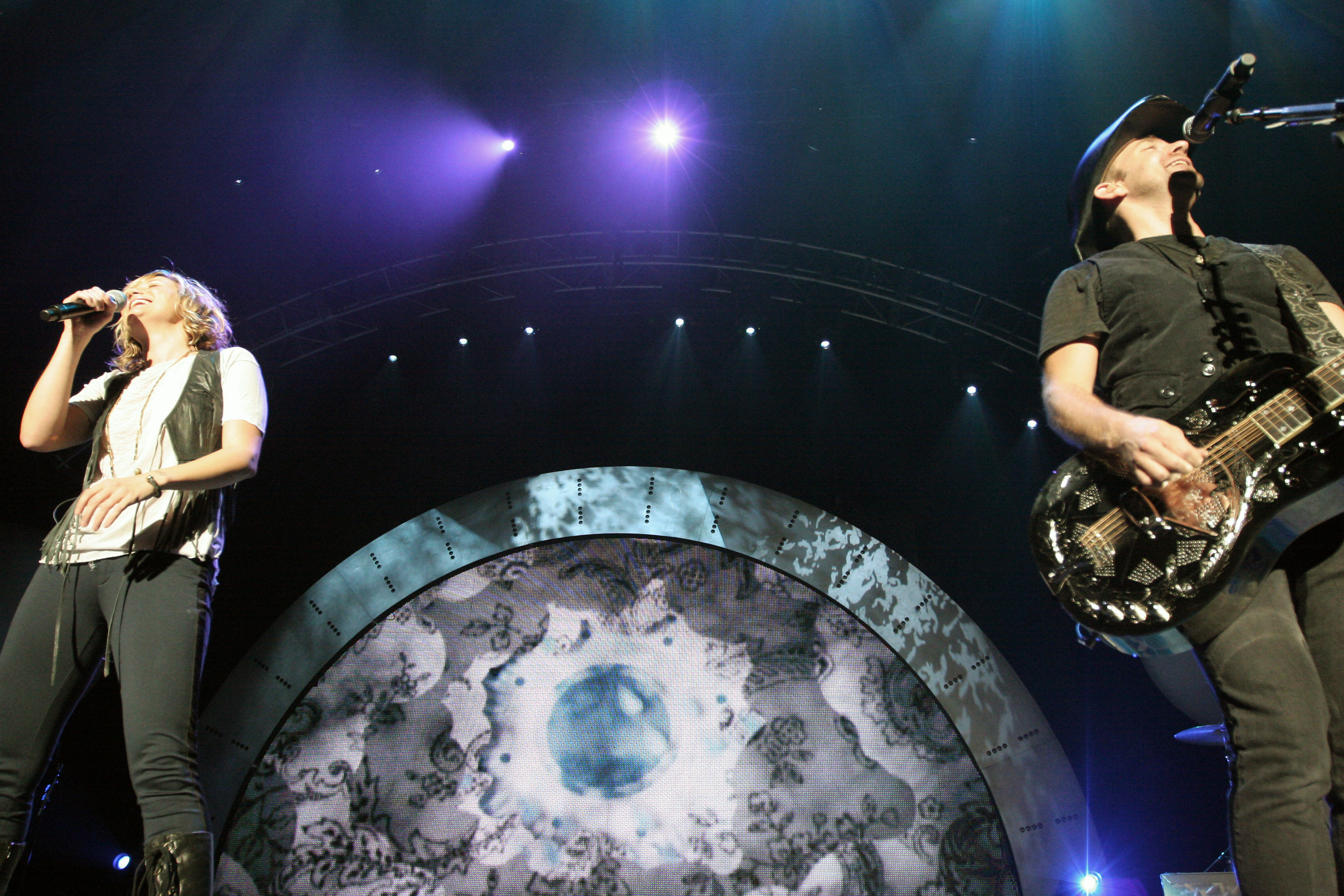
- Studio albums: 6
- Extended plays: 1
- Live albums: 1
- Compilation albums: 1
- Singles: 18
- Music videos: 22
- Other charted songs: 9
- No. 1 singles: 5

The American country music duo Sugarland has released six studio albums for Mercury Nashville and 18 singles, including one as a featured artist. Founded in 2002 as a trio composed of Kristian Bush, Kristen Hall, and Jennifer Nettles, they have recorded as a duo since Hall's departure in December 2005.

Their debut single, "Baby Girl" peaked at number 2 on the Billboard Hot Country Singles & Tracks chart. This made it the highest-charting debut single for a country group in 13 years, and set a record for the longest country chart run since the inception of Nielsen SoundScan. The song is included on their 2004 debut major-label album, Twice the Speed of Life, which has been certified three-times Platinum by the Recording Industry Association of America.

Love on the Inside, released in 2008, was Sugarland's first number one album, reaching that position on both the Top Country Albums and Billboard 200 charts. This album produced three straight number-one hits in "All I Want to Do", "Already Gone", and "It Happens". Sugarland released its fifth album, The Incredible Machine, on October 19, 2010. The album's first single, "Stuck Like Glue", was released to radio on July 20, 2010. The Incredible Machine was released on February 7, 2011 in the UK, with "Stuck Like Glue" released as the first UK single on January 31, 2011.

All of the group's albums have charted within the top three on the Country Albums chart, with three additionally reaching the top position on the all-genre Billboard 200. They have produced eleven top ten singles on the country charts, of which five reached number one.

In early 2006, Nettles sang guest vocals on a re-recording of Bon Jovi's "Who Says You Can't Go Home", which became a number-one country airplay hit. The group were featured on Matt Nathanson's 2011 single, "Run".

== Studio albums ==
Title	Details	Peak chart positions										Certifications	Sales
Title	Details	US	US Country	AUS	CAN	IRE	NOR	NZ Heat	SCO	UK	UK Country	Certifications	Sales
Twice the Speed of Life	Release date: October 26, 2004; Label: Mercury Nashville; Formats: CD, music download	16	3	—	—	—	6	—	—	—	16	RIAA: 3× Platinum; MC: Gold	
Enjoy the Ride	Release date: November 7, 2006; Label: Mercury Nashville; Formats: CD, music download	4	2	83	—	—	—	—	—	—	17	RIAA: 3× Platinum	
Love on the Inside	Release date: July 29, 2008; Label: Mercury Nashville; Formats: CD, music download	1	1	74	4	—	—	—	—	—	4	RIAA: 2× Platinum; MC: Gold	
Gold and Green	Release date: October 13, 2009; Label: Mercury Nashville; Formats: CD, music download	24	3	—	—	—	—	—	—	—	12		US: 256,000
The Incredible Machine	Release date: October 19, 2010; Label: Mercury Nashville; Formats: CD, music download	1	1	47	2	44	—	—	40	43	1	RIAA: Platinum	US: 1,079,000
Bigger	Release date: June 8, 2018; Label: Big Machine; Formats: CD, music download	11	2	64	31	—	—	7	34	— (Note: Bigger did not enter the UK Albums Chart, but peaked at number 17 on the UK Album Sales Chart.)	3		US: 57,500
"—" denotes releases that did not chart

== Compilation albums ==
Title	Details
The Very Best of Sugarland	Release date: 2014; Label: Universal/Cracker Barrel; Formats: CD

== Live albums ==
Title	Details	Peak chart positions			
Title	Details	US	US Country	CAN	UK Country
Live on the Inside	Release date: August 4, 2009; Label: Mercury Nashville; Formats: CD, music download	1	1	5	4

== Extended plays ==
Title	Details
There Goes the Neighborhood	Release date: August 9, 2024; Label: Big Machine; Formats: music download

== Singles ==
=== As lead artist ===
Single	Year	Peak chart positions										Certifications (sales threshold)	Album
Single	Year	US	US Country	US Country Airplay	US Pop	AUS	CAN	CAN Country	NZ Heat	SCO	UK	Certifications (sales threshold)	Album
"Baby Girl"	2004	38	2		64	—	—	1	—	—	—	RIAA: Gold	Twice the Speed of Life
"Something More"	2005	35	2		69	—	—	1	—	—	—	RIAA: Gold	Twice the Speed of Life
"Just Might (Make Me Believe)"	2005	60	7		—	—	—	9	—	—	—	RIAA: Gold	Twice the Speed of Life
"Down in Mississippi (Up to No Good)"	2006	— (Note: "Down in Mississippi (Up to No Good)" did not enter the Hot 100, but peaked at number 1 on the Bubbling Under Hot 100 Singles extension chart.)	17		—	—	—	24	—	—	—		Twice the Speed of Life
"Want To"	2006	32	1		49	—	— (Note: "Want To" did not enter the Billboard Canadian Hot 100, but peaked at number 24 on the Canadian All-format Airplay chart.)	1	—	—	—	RIAA: Gold	Enjoy the Ride
"Settlin'"	2007	54	1		93	—	47	1	—	—	—	RIAA: Gold	Enjoy the Ride
"Everyday America"	2007	68	9		—	—	—	19	—	—	—		Enjoy the Ride
"Stay"	2007	32	2		36	—	48	2	—	—	—	RIAA: Platinum	Enjoy the Ride
"All I Want to Do"	2008	18	1		—	62	32	1	—	—	—	RIAA: Platinum	Love on the Inside
"Already Gone"	2008	41	1		—	—	57	1	—	—	—		Love on the Inside
"It Happens"	2009	33	1		—	—	47	1	—	—	—	RIAA: Gold	Love on the Inside
"Joey"	2009	89	17		—	—	— (Note: "Joey" did not enter the Billboard Canadian Hot 100, but peaked at number 43 on the Canadian All-format Airplay chart.)	6	—	—	—		Love on the Inside
"Stuck Like Glue"	2010	17	2		— (Note: "Stuck Like Glue" did not enter the Pop Airplay chart, but peaked at number 22 on the Adult Pop Airplay chart.)	—	29	2	—	66	74	RIAA: 2× Platinum	The Incredible Machine
"Little Miss"	2010	71	11		—	—	—	13	—	—	—		The Incredible Machine
"Tonight"	2011	—	32		—	—	—	49	—	—	—		The Incredible Machine
"Still the Same"	2017	—	35	26	—	—	—	—	—	—	—		Bigger
"Babe" (featuring Taylor Swift)	2018	72	8	17	—	—	94	16	10	64	— (Note: "Babe" did not enter the UK Singles Chart, but peaked at number 72 on the UK Singles Downloads Chart.)	RIAA: Gold	Bigger
"—" denotes releases that did not chart

=== As featured artist ===
Title	Year	Peak chart positions				Album
Title	Year	US	US Country	US Adult	US Rock Dig.	Album
"Run" (Matt Nathanson featuring Sugarland)	2011	53	60	17	4	Modern Love

=== Promotional singles ===
Single	Year	Peak chart positions	Album
Single	Year	US Country Digital	Album
"Incredible Machine"	2010	12	The Incredible Machine
"Wide Open"	2010	17	The Incredible Machine
"Bigger"	2018	—	Bigger
"Mother"	2018	—	Bigger
"—" denotes releases that did not chart

== Other charted songs ==
Song	Year	Peak chart positions				Album
Song	Year	US	US Country	CAN	CAN Country	Album
"Stand Back Up"	2005	—	47	—	—	Twice the Speed of Life
"Winter Wonderland"	2007	—	50	—	—	Enjoy the Ride (Note: "Winter Wonderland" and "Nuttin' for Christmas" were only included on the Christmas edition of Enjoy the Ride exclusive to Walmart and Target.) and Gold and Green
"Nuttin' for Christmas"	2007	—	48	—	—	Enjoy the Ride and Gold and Green
"Life in a Northern Town" (with Little Big Town and Jake Owen)	2008	43	28	53	30	Love on the Inside
"Keep You"	2009	— (Note: "Keep You" did not enter the Hot 100, but peaked at number 7 on the Bubbling Under Hot 100 Singles extension chart.)	—	—	—	Love on the Inside
"Gold and Green"	2010	—	60	—	—	Gold and Green
"Little Wood Guitar"	2010	—	—	—	49	Gold and Green
"All We Are"	2010	— (Note: "All We Are" did not enter the Hot 100, but peaked at number 17 on the Bubbling Under Hot 100 Singles extension chart.)	— (Note: "All We Are" did not enter the Hot Country Songs, but peaked at number 11 on the Country Digital Song Sales chart.)	—	—	The Incredible Machine
"Every Girl Like Me"	2010	—	— (Note: "Every Girl Like Me" did not enter the Hot Country Songs, but peaked at number 36 on the Country Digital Song Sales chart.)	—	—	The Incredible Machine
"Shine the Light"	2010	—	— (Note: "Shine the Light" did not enter the Hot Country Songs, but peaked at number 40 on the Country Digital Song Sales chart.)	—	—	The Incredible Machine
"—" denotes releases that did not chart

== Music videos ==
Most of Sugarland's singles have featured an accompanying music video, with the exception of "It Happens" and "Little Miss". An album cut, "Love", featured a live performance video that rotated on CMT in early 2009. In addition, a concept video was filmed for another album cut, titled "Keep You", and was released in late 2009.

Year	Title	Director
2004	"Baby Girl"	Peter Zavadil
2005	"Something More"	Paul Boyd
2005	"Just Might (Make Me Believe)"	Paul Boyd
2006	"Down in Mississippi (Up to No Good)"	Shaun Silva
2006	"Want To"	Shaun Silva
2007	"Settlin'"	Paul Boyd
2007	"Everyday America"	Rocky Schenck
2007	"Stay"	Shaun Silva
2008	"Life in a Northern Town" (with Little Big Town and Jake Owen; live)	Becky Fluke
2008	"All I Want to Do"	Shaun Silva
2008	"Already Gone"	Shaun Silva
2008	"Love" (live)	Shaun Silva
2009	"Love Shack" (with The B-52's; from 2009 CMT Music Awards)	Alan Carter
2009	"Nightswimming/Joey" (live)	Shaun Silva
2009	"Keep You"	Shaun Silva
2010	"Stuck Like Glue"	Declan Whitebloom
2010	"Gold and Green"	UMG Nashville
2011	"Tonight"	Marcus Raboy
2012	"Run" (with Matt Nathanson)	Valarie Allyn Bienas
2017	"Still the Same" (version 1)	Seth Hellman & Nicole Flemmi
2018	"Still the Same" (version 2)	
2018	"Babe" (with Taylor Swift)	Anthony Mandler
