= List of awards and nominations received by Sugarland =

Sugarland awards and nominations
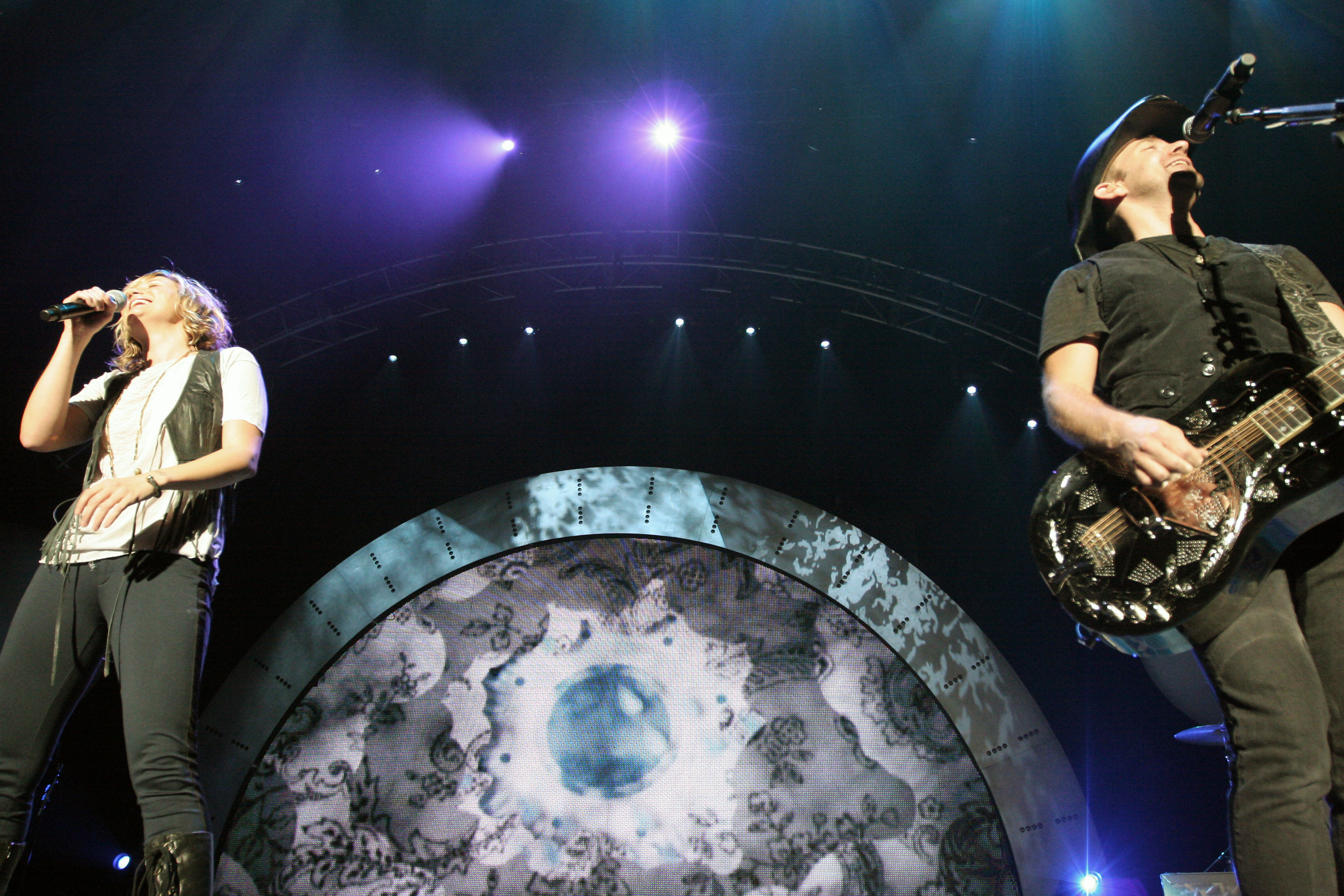
- Sugarland in concert, Jacksonville, Florida
Awards and nominations
Award	Wins	Nominations
Grammy Awards	2	5
Academy of Country Music Awards	5	17
Country Music Association Awards	6	17
American Music Awards	1	3
CMT Music Awards	4	18
American Country Awards	0	4
Billboard Music Awards	0	3

Totals (Note: Certain award groups do not simply award one winner. They acknowledge several different recipients, have runners-up, and have third place. Since this is a specific recognition and is different from losing an award, runner-up mentions are considered wins in this award tally. For simplification and to avoid errors, each award in this list has been presumed to have had a prior nomination.)
- Wins: 18
- Nominations: 71

This is a list of the awards and nominations received by American country music duo Sugarland.

== Academy of Country Music Awards ==
The Academy of Country Music Awards is an annual country music awards show, the first of its kind, it was established in 1964. Sugarland has won awards, They have won five ACM Awards out of seventeen nominations.

Year	Recipient	Award	Result
2006	Sugarland	Top New Duo or Vocal Group	Won
2006	Sugarland	Top Vocal Group	Nominated
2006	Twice the Speed of Life	Album of the Year	Nominated
2006	"Baby Girl"	Song of the Year	Nominated
2006	"Baby Girl"	Single Record of the Year	Nominated
2007	Sugarland	Top Vocal Duo	Nominated
2008	Sugarland	Top Vocal Duo	Nominated
2008	"Stay"	Song of the Year	Won
2008	"Stay"	Single of the Year	Won
2008	"Stay"	Video of the Year	Nominated
2009	Sugarland	Top Vocal Duo	Won
2009	"Life in a Northern Town" (with Little Big Town & Jake Owen)	Vocal Event of the Year	Nominated
2010	Sugarland	Top Vocal Duo	Nominated
2011	Sugarland	Top Vocal Duo	Won
2011	"Stuck Like Glue"	Video of the Year	Nominated
2012	Sugarland	Top Vocal Duo	Nominated
2013	Sugarland	Top Vocal Duo	Nominated

== American Country Awards ==
The American Country Awards is a country music awards show, entirely voted on by fans. Created by the Fox Network, the awards honor country music artists who excell music, video, and touring. Sugarland has been nominated for this award four times.

Year	Recipient	Award	Result
2010	The Incredible Machine	Touring Headline Package of the Year	Nominated
2010	Sugarland	Artist of the Year: Duo or Group	Nominated
2011	Sugarland	Artist of the Year: Duo or Group	Nominated
2011	"Stuck Like Glue"	Single by a Duo/Group	Nominated

== American Music Awards ==
The American Music Awards is an annual awards ceremony created by Dick Clark in 1973. Sugarland has won one AMA out of three nominations.

Year	Recipient	Award	Result
2005	Sugarland	Favorite Breakthrough New Artist	Won
2008	Sugarland	Favorite Country Band/Duo/Group	Nominated
2009	Sugarland	Favorite Country Band/Duo/Group	Nominated

== Billboard Music Awards ==
The Billboard Music Award is an honor given by Billboard, the preeminent publication covering the music business. Finalists are based on United States year-end chart performance according to Nielsen data for sales, number of downloads and total airplay. They have been nominated three times for this award.

Year	Recipient	Award	Result
2006	Sugarland	Duo/Group Country Artist of the Year	Nominated
2011	"Stuck Like Glue"	Top Country Song	Nominated
2011	The Incredible Machine	Top Country Album	Nominated

== Country Music Association Awards ==
The Country Music Association Awards is an annual country music awards show, established in 1967. They have won six CMA's out of seventeen nominations.

Year	Recipient	Award	Result
2005	Sugarland	Vocal Group of the Year	Nominated
2005	Sugarland	Horizon Award	Nominated
2005	"Baby Girl"	Single of the Year	Nominated
2006	Sugarland	Vocal Group of the Year	Nominated
2006	Sugarland	Horizon Award	Nominated
2007	Sugarland	Vocal Duo of the Year	Won
2008	Sugarland	Vocal Duo of the Year	Won
2008	Sugarland	Entertainer of the Year	Nominated
2008	"Stay"	Single of the Year	Nominated
2008	"Stay"	Song of the Year	Won
2008	"Stay"	Music Video of the Year	Nominated
2008	"Life in a Northern Town" (with Little Big Town & Jake Owen)	Musical Event of the Year	Nominated
2009	Sugarland	Vocal Duo of the Year	Won
2009	Love on the Inside	Album of the Year	Nominated
2010	Sugarland	Vocal Duo of the Year	Won
2011	Sugarland	Vocal Duo of the Year	Won
2012	Sugarland	Vocal Duo of the Year	Nominated
2018	Sugarland	Vocal Duo of the Year	Nominated
2018	"Babe"	Video of the Year	Nominated

== CMT Music Awards ==
The CMT Music Awards is an annual fan-voted video music awards show that was established in 2002 by CMT, dedicated exclusively to honor country music videos.

Year	Recipient	Award	Result
2006	"Something More"	Breakthrough of the Year	Nominated
2006	"Just Might (Make Me Believe)"	Group/Duo Video of the Year	Nominated
2007	"Want To"	Video of the Year	Nominated
2007	"Want To"	Duo Video of the Year	Won
2008	"Stay"	Video of the Year	Nominated
2008	"Stay"	Duo Video of the Year	Won
2008	"Stay"	Performance Video of the Year	Nominated
2008	"Stay"	Tearjerker Video of the Year	Nominated
2009	"All I Want to Do"	Video of the Year	Nominated
2009	"All I Want to Do"	Duo Video of the Year	Won
2009	"Already Gone"	Duo Video of the Year	Nominated
2009	"Life in a Northern Town" (with Little Big Town & Jake Owen)	CMT Performance of the Year	Nominated
2009	"Life in a Northern Town" (with Little Big Town & Jake Owen)	Collaborative Video of the Year	Nominated
2010	"Nightswimming/Joey"	Duo Video of the Year	Nominated
2010	"Keep You"	Duo Video of the Year	Nominated
2011	"Stuck Like Glue"	Duo Video of the Year	Won
2011	"Stuck Like Glue"	Video of the Year	Nominated
2012	"Tonight"	Duo Video of the Year	Nominated
2019	"Babe" (feat. Taylor Swift)	Duo Video of the Year	Nominated
2019	"Babe" (feat. Taylor Swift)	Collaborative Video of the Year	Nominated

== Grammy Awards ==
The Grammy Awards are presented annually by the National Academy of Recording Arts and Sciences for outstanding achievements in the music industry. It was established in 1959. Sugarland has won two Grammys out of five nominations.

Year	Recipient	Award	Result
2006	Sugarland	Best New Artist	Nominated
2009	"Stay"	Best Country Performance by a Duo or Group with Vocals	Won
2009	"Stay"	Best Country Song	Won
2009	"Life in a Northern Town" (with Little Big Town & Jake Owen)	Best Country Collaboration with Vocals	Nominated
2010	"It Happens"	Best Country Performance by a Duo or Group with Vocals	Nominated

== Other nominations ==
- 2005: Radio Music Awards - Song of the Year/Country Radio "Baby Girl"
- 2010: Teen Choice Awards - Choice Music: Country Group
