= Live on the Inside =

Live album by Sugarland
- Released: August 4, 2009
- Recorded: April 4, 2008, Fox Theatre, Atlanta, Georgia; October 25, 2008, Rupp Arena, Lexington, Kentucky; April 17, 2009, Target Center, Minneapolis, Minnesota; April 22, 2009, The Centrium, Red Deer, Alberta; April 30, 2009, Frank Erwin Center, Austin, Texas
- Genre: Country
- Label: Mercury Nashville
- Producer: Jennifer Nettles

Sugarland chronology
| Love on the Inside (2008) | Live on the Inside (2009) | Gold and Green (2009) |

Professional ratings
Review scores
| Source | Rating |
|---|---|
| AllMusic | 3.5/5 stars |
| Country Weekly | 3.5/5 stars |

Live on the Inside is a live DVD/CD set from country music duo Sugarland. It is their first live CD/DVD set and their fourth album overall. It was released on August 4, 2009, exclusively at Wal-Mart stores, and debuted at number one on both the U.S. Billboard 200 and Country Albums chart.

The day before the release of the CD/DVD, segments from the concert were featured in a one-hour ABC television special of the same name on August 3, 2009, at 8:00 PM. The special was watched by more than 4 million viewers.

== History ==
The DVD was filmed during their October 25, 2008 concert at Rupp Arena in Lexington, Kentucky. The CD features performances from various concerts, including Lexington, KY (tracks 1, 5, 7, 8, & 10), Alberta, Canada (track 2), Atlanta, Georgia (track 6), Austin, Texas (track 3), & Minneapolis, Minnesota (tracks 4 & 9).

In December 2008, the duo released a live music video for the song "Love". Footage from this video was taken from the same concert in Lexington.

On June 16, 2009, the set was officially announced on their official website. Filmed in high-definition by director Shaun Silva with twenty cameras, the DVD features 16 songs and over an hour of live performance footage including all of their #1 hits, as well as other songs from their previous albums.

The 10-track CD features cover songs performed by the duo including Beyoncé's "Irreplaceable", The B-52's "Love Shack", Edie Brickel's "Circle", R.E.M's "Nightswimming" & "The One I Love", Pearl Jam's "Better Man" and Kings of Leon's "Sex on Fire". The CD also features four Sugarland songs.

== Critical reception ==
Thom Jurek of AllMusic gave the album three-and-a-half stars out of five, referring to it as "nearly the perfect document in that it contains not only the historic gig in all its technologically savvy glory, but also enough curios to interest even a casual fan." Chris Neal of Country Weekly magazine also rated it three-and-a-half stars out of five, making note of the "quirky covers" on the CD portion, but also criticizing the duo for not choosing a country music cover.

== Track listing ==
CD
| No. | Title | Writer(s) | Length |
|---|---|---|---|
| 1. | "Love" | Kristian Bush, Jennifer Nettles, Tim Owens | 4:14 |
| 2. | "Circle" | Edie Brickell, Kenny Withrow | 3:13 |
| 3. | "Better Man" | Eddie Vedder | 4:43 |
| 4. | "Sex on Fire" | Caleb Followill, Jared Followill, Matthew Followill, Nathan Followill | 4:22 |
| 5. | "All I Want to Do" | Bush, Nettles, Bobby Pinson | 3:42 |
| 6. | "Irreplaceable" | Amund Bjørklund, Mikkel S. Eriksen, Beyoncé Knowles, Espen Lind, Shaffer Smith, Tor Erik Hermansen | 3:31 |
| 7. | "Nightswimming"/"Joey" | Bill Anderson, Bill Berry, Peter Buck, Bush, Mike Mills, Nettles, Michael Stipe | 6:22 |
| 8. | "The One I Love" | Berry, Buck, Mills, Stipe | 3:24 |
| 9. | "Love Shack" | Kate Pierson, Fred Schneider, Keith Strickland, Cindy Wilson | 5:20 |
| 10. | "Stay" | Nettles | 5:31 |

DVD track listing
| No. | Title | Length |
|---|---|---|
| 1. | "Love" |
| 2. | "Settlin'" |
| 3. | "Baby Girl" |
| 4. | "Want To" |
| 5. | "Nightswimming" |
| 6. | "Joey" |
| 7. | "Already Gone" |
| 8. | "Steve Earle" |
| 9. | "Genevieve" |
| 10. | "All I Want to Do" |
| 11. | "Everyday America" |
| 12. | "Stay" |
| 13. | "Down in Mississippi (Up to No Good)" |
| 14. | "The One I Love" |
| 15. | "Crowd Surfing" (instrumental) |
| 16. | "Something More" |
| 17. | "It Happens" (audio only) |

== Personnel ==
Sugarland

- Kristian Bush - acoustic guitar, mandolin, background vocals
- Jennifer Nettles - acoustic guitar, piano, lead vocals

Additional Musicians

- Thad Beaty - acoustic guitar, electric guitar
- Brandon Bush - accordion, keyboards, background vocals
- Annie Clements - bass guitar, background vocals
- Travis McNabb - drums
- Scott Patton - acoustic guitar, electric guitar, background vocals

== Charts ==
=== Weekly charts ===
| Chart (2009) | Peak position |
|---|---|
| Canadian Albums (Billboard) | 5 |
| US Billboard 200 | 1 |
| US Top Country Albums (Billboard) | 1 |

=== Year-end charts ===
| Chart (2009) | Position |
|---|---|
| US Billboard 200 | 161 |
| US Top Country Albums (Billboard) | 32 |
| Chart (2010) | Position |
| US Top Country Albums (Billboard) | 75 |
