= 41st Academy of Country Music Awards =

US music awards ceremony in 2006

- Date: May 23, 2006
- Location: MGM Grand Garden Arena, Las Vegas, Nevada
- Hosted by: Reba McEntire

Highlights
- Most wins: Brad Paisley (3)
- Most nominations: Brad Paisley (5)

Television/radio coverage
- Network: CBS

The 41st Academy of Country Music Awards were held on May 23, 2006 at the MGM Grand Garden Arena Las Vegas, Nevada. The ceremony was hosted by ACM Award Winner, Reba McEntire.

== Winners and nominees ==
Winners are shown in bold.

| Entertainer of the Year | Album of the Year |
|---|---|
| **Kenny Chesney**; Brooks & Dunn; Toby Keith; Rascal Flatts; Keith Urban | **Time Well Wasted — Brad Paisley**; Feels Like Today — Rascal Flatts; There’s More Where That Came From — Lee Ann Womack; Tough All Over — Gary Allan; Twice the Speed of Life — Sugarland |
| Top Female Vocalist of the Year | Top Male Vocalist of the Year |
| **Sara Evans**; Martina McBride; Carrie Underwood; Gretchen Wilson; Lee Ann Womack | **Keith Urban**; Dierks Bentley; Kenny Chesney; Brad Paisley; George Strait |
| Top Vocal Group of the Year | Top Vocal Duo of the Year |
| **Rascal Flatts**; Alabama; Little Big Town; Lonestar; Sugarland | **Brooks & Dunn**; Big & Rich; Montgomery Gentry; Van Zant; The Warren Brothers |
| Single Record of the Year | Song of the Year |
| **“Jesus, Take the Wheel” — Carrie Underwood**; “Alcohol” — Brad Paisley; “Baby Girl” — Sugarland; “Believe” — Brooks & Dunn; “Best I Ever Had” — Gary Allan | **“Believe” — Ronnie Dunn and Craig Wiseman**; “Baby Girl” — Kristian Bush, Kristen Hall, Jennifer Nettles and Troy Bieser; “Jesus, Take the Wheel” — Hillary Lindsey, Gordie Sampson and Brett James; “Skin (Sarabeth)” — Doug Johnson and Joe Henry; “When I Get Where I’m Going” — George Teren and Rivers Rutherford |
| Top New Male Vocalist of the Year | Top New Female Vocalist of the Year |
| **Jason Aldean**; Billy Currington; Craig Morgan | **Carrie Underwood**; Miranda Lambert; Julie Roberts |
| Top New Duo or Group of the Year | Video of the Year |
| **Sugarland**; Big & Rich; Little Big Town | **When I Get Where I'm Going — Brad Paisley and Dolly Parton**; As Good as I Once Was — Toby Keith; Believe — Brooks & Dunn; I May Hate Myself in the Morning — Lee Ann Womack; Kerosene — Miranda Lambert |
Vocal Event of the Year
**“When I Get Where I’m Going” — Brad Paisley and Dolly Parton**; “I Play Chicken With the Train” — Cowboy Troy and Big & Rich; “Like We Never Loved at All” — Faith Hill with Tim McGraw; “Who Says You Can’t Go Home” — Jennifer Nettles and Bon Jovi

== Performers ==
| Performer(s) | Song(s) |
|---|---|
| Brad Paisley | "The World" |
| Miranda Lambert | "New Strings" |
| Toby Keith | "A Little Too Late" |
| Dierks Bentley | "Settle for a Slowdown" |
| Big & Rich | "8th of November" |
| Carrie Underwood | "Jesus, Take the Wheel" |
| Trace Adkins | "Honky Tonk Badonkadonk" |
| Kenny Chesney | "Summertime" |
| Gretchen Wilson; Merle Haggard | "Politically Uncorrect" |
| Sugarland | "Down in Mississippi (Up to No Good)" |
| Montgomery Gentry | "Something to Be Proud Of" |
| Little Big Town | "Boondocks" |
| Rascal Flatts; Kelly Clarkson | "Me and My Gang" "What Hurts the Most" |
| Keith Urban | "Tonight I Wanna Cry" |
| Sara Evans | "Coalmine" |
| Brooks & Dunn; Keith Urban | "Believe" |
| Martina McBride | "Thanks a Lot" |
| Dwight Yoakam; Billy Gibbons; Chris Hillman; Travis Barker; Tom Brumley; Brad Paisley; Buddy Alan | Buck Owens Tribute "Act Naturally" "Together Again" "Crying Time" "Streets of Bakersfield" |

== Presenters ==
| Presenter(s) | Notes |
|---|---|
| Phil Vassar; Hannah Storm | Song of the Year |
| Billy Currington; Kathryn Morris | Album of the Year |
| Joe Nichols; Michelle Stafford | Top New Male Vocalist of the Year |
| Kris Kristofferson | Introduced Big & Rich |
| Julie Roberts; Dean Sams; Keech Rainwater | Top New Duo or Group of the Year |
| Billy Ray Cyrus; Miley Cyrus | Single Record of the Year |
| Jo Dee Messina; Blake Shelton | Top New Female Vocalist of the Year |
| Tony Stewart | Present Home Depot Humanitarian Award for Vince Gill |
| The Warren Brothers | Top Vocal Group of the Year |
| Craig Ferguson; The Wreckers | Top Male Vocalist of the Year |
| Phil McGraw; Robin McGraw | Top Vocal Duo of the Year |
| John Corbett | Top Female Vocalist of the Year |
| Vince Vaughn | Introduced Buck Owens tribute performance |
