= Enjoy the Ride (Sugarland album) =

Studio album by Sugarland
- Released: November 7, 2006
- Recorded: February–September 2006
- Genre: Country
- Length: 42:25
- Label: Mercury Nashville
- Producer: Byron Gallimore; Sugarland

Sugarland chronology
Twice the Speed of Life (2004)	Enjoy the Ride (2006)	Love on the Inside (2008)

Singles from Enjoy the Ride
- 1. "Want To" Released: August 21, 2006; 2. "Settlin'" Released: January 1, 2007; 3. "Everyday America" Released: May 21, 2007; 4. "Stay" Released: September 10, 2007

Professional ratings
Review scores
Source	Rating
About.com	4.5/5 stars
AllMusic	4/5 stars
Country Weekly	(average)
Entertainment Weekly	B
People	3/4 stars
Plugged In (publication)	(mixed)
Rolling Stone	3/5 stars
Slant Magazine	3/5 stars

Enjoy the Ride is the second studio album by American country music duo Sugarland, released on November 7, 2006, on Mercury Nashville Records. The album is the first one released with Sugarland as a duo (comprising Jennifer Nettles and Kristian Bush), as former member Kristen Hall had departed earlier in 2006.

The album debuted at No. 4 on the US Billboard 200 and at No. 2 on the US Country Album Chart, selling 211,000 copies in its first week; these were also its peak positions on the two charts. The album is certified 3× platinum by the RIAA for shipments of 3 million copies.

The album produced four chart singles on the Billboard Hot Country Songs charts, all of which were Top Ten hits. "Want To" and "Settlin'" (respectively the first and second singles) were both Number One hits, with the former being their first U.S. Number One. "Everyday America", the third single, was a No. 9 on the country charts and was used on the TV series Good Morning America. The final single was the acoustic ballad "Stay", which peaked at No. 2.

== Track listing ==
No.	Title	Writer(s)	Length
1.	"Settlin'"	Jennifer Nettles; Kristian Bush; Tim Owens	3:27
2.	"County Line"	Nettles; Bush; Lisa Carver	2:50
3.	"Want To"	Nettles; Bush; Bobby Pinson	3:35
4.	"Everyday America"	Nettles; Bush; Carver	3:52
5.	"Happy Ending"	Nettles; Bush; Owens	5:16
6.	"These Are the Days"	Nettles; Bush; Carver	3:49
7.	"One Blue Sky"	Nettles; Bush; Carver	4:17
8.	"April Showers"	Nettles; Bush; Jeff Cohen	3:24
9.	"Mean Girls"	Nettles; Bush; Owens	2:40
10.	"Stay"	Nettles	4:44
11.	"Sugarland"	Bush; Kristen Hall; Vanessa Olivarez	4:24

Target bonus tracks
No.	Title	Writer(s)	Length
12.	"Baby Girl" (Clear Channel Stripped)	Nettles; Bush; Hall; Troy Bieser	4:04
13.	"Down in Mississippi (Up to No Good)" (Clear Channel Stripped)	Nettles; Bush; Hall	2:53

Australian bonus track
No.	Title	Writer(s)	Length
12.	"Who Says You Can't Go Home" (with Bon Jovi; from Have a Nice Day)	Jon Bon Jovi; Richie Sambora	3:50

A music video was made for "These Are the Days" even though it was not released as a single. The video is available on the iTunes Store.

Wal-Mart bonus Christmas CD
No.	Title	Writer(s)	Length
1.	"Little Wood Guitar"	Bush; Ellis Paul	4:12
2.	"Nuttin' for Christmas"	Sid Tepper; Roy C. Bennett	3:24
3.	"Holly Jolly Christmas"	Johnny Marks	3:06
4.	"O Come, O Come, Emmanuel"	Traditional	4:08
5.	"Winter Wonderland"	Felix Bernard; Richard B. Smith	2:27

== Personnel ==
=== Sugarland ===
- Kristian Bush – acoustic guitar; background vocals (except 9, 10); mandolin (2, 3, 4, 6, 7, 11); electric guitar (2, 5); second lead vocals (6)
- Jennifer Nettles – lead vocals; background vocals (1, 2, 3, 8); acoustic guitar (3)

=== Additional personnel ===
- Thad Beaty – electric guitar (4)
- Mike Brignardello – bass guitar (6)
- Tom Bukovac – electric guitar, synthesizer
- Brandon Bush – organ (3, 4, 10); clavinet, drum loops, percussion (4)
- Paul Bushnell – bass guitar (2, 5, 9, 11)
- Annie Clements – bass guitar (4); background vocals (4, 7)
- Dan Dugmore – electric guitar (1, 7); steel guitar (1, 2, 5, 8, 9, 11); Dobro (3, 8); acoustic guitar (6)
- Shannon Forrest – drums, percussion (6, 11); cymbals (2)
- Kenny Greenberg – electric guitar (1, 3, 6, 7, 8, 11)
- Rob Hajacos – fiddle (2, 8)
- Tony Harrell – organ (1–3, 5, 7–9, 11); accordion (2, 7, 8); Mellotron (3, 6); piano (5, 6); synthesizer (5, 6); harmonium (8)
- Jarrod Johnson – drums (4)
- Tim Lauer – accordion (2)
- Greg Morrow – drums, percussion (1–3, 5, 7–9); drum loops (9)
- Brad Paisley – electric guitar (track 9)
- Scott Patton – electric guitar (4)
- Glenn Worf – bass guitar (1, 3, 7, 8)

== Chart performance ==
=== Weekly charts ===
Chart (2006)	Peak position
Australian Albums (ARIA)	83
Australian Country Albums (ARIA)	8
US Billboard 200	4
US Top Country Albums (Billboard)	2

=== Year-end charts ===
Chart (2006)	Position
US Top Country Albums (Billboard)	55
Chart (2007)	Position
US Billboard 200	29
US Top Country Albums (Billboard)	5
Chart (2008)	Position
US Billboard 200	30
US Top Country Albums (Billboard)	7

== Certifications ==
Region	Certification
United States (RIAA)	3× Platinum
