= Ride or Die Tour =

Sugarland concert tour

- Headlining tour by Sugarland
- Location: United States
- Start date: October 1, 2026
- End date: November 21, 2026
- Legs: 1
- No. of shows: 26

Sugarland concert chronology
- Take Me Home Tour (2024); Ride or Die Tour (2026)

The Ride or Die Tour is the sixth and current headlining concert tour by American country music duo Sugarland. The tour is to celebrate the twentith anniversary of their second studio album, Enjoy the Ride. It began on October 1, 2026, in St. Augustine, Florida and will finish on November 21, 2026, in Grand Prairie, Texas. This is their first headlining tour in eight years.

== Background ==
While appearing on Today with Jenna & Sheinelle on August, 11, 2026, Sugarland announced the tour. Regarding the tour and the anniversary of Enjoy the Ride, lead singer, Jennifer Nettles says, "It literally catapulted us onto the ride of our lives with a carnival of hits and a life on The Road," "We couldn't let its anniversary pass without marking it as something special with our fans, live and on tour!".

== Opening act ==
- Payton Sullivan

== Tour dates ==
List of 2026 concerts
Date	City	Country	Venue
October 1	St. Augustine	United States	St. Augustine Amphitheatre
October 2	North Charleston	United States	North Charleston Coliseum
October 3	Greensboro	United States	First Horizon Coliseum
October 8	Champaign	United States	State Farm Center
October 9	Green Bay	United States	Resch Center
October 10	La Crosse	United States	La Crosse Center
October 13	Sioux City	United States	Summit Arena
October 16	Rapid City	United States	Resch Center
October 17	New Town	United States	4 Bears Casino
October 18	Grand Forks	United States	Alerus Center
October 20	Duluth	United States	AMSOIL Arena
October 22	Cedar Rapids	United States	Alliant Energy PowerHouse
October 23	Rockford	United States	BMO Harris Bank Center
October 24	Battle Creek	United States	FireKeepers Casino Hotel
November 3	Clarksville	United States	F&M Bank Arena
November 5	Youngstown	United States	Covelli Centre
November 6	Pikeville	United States	Appalachian Wireless Arena
November 7	Duluth	United States	Gas South Arena
November 11	Bangor	United States	Cross Insurance Center
November 12	Uncasville	United States	Mohegan Sun Arena
November 13	Atlantic City	United States	Borgata Event Center
November 14	Reading	United States	Santander Arena
November 17	Toledo	United States	Huntington Center
November 19	St. Charles	United States	Family Arena
November 20	Tulsa	United States	River Spirit Casino
November 21	Grand Prairie	United States	Texas Trust CU Theatre
