= Gold and Green =

Studio album (Christmas) by Sugarland
- Released: October 13, 2009
- Recorded: July 2009
- Genres: Christmas; country
- Length: 37:04
- Label: Mercury Nashville
- Producers: Byron Gallimore; Sugarland

Sugarland chronology
Live on the Inside (2009)	Gold and Green (2009)	The Incredible Machine (2010)

Professional ratings
Review scores
Source	Rating
Allmusic	2/5 stars
Paste	(38/100)
Engine 145	2/5 stars
Roughstock	(favorable)

Gold and Green is the fourth studio album and first Christmas album from American country music duo Sugarland. The album was released on October 13, 2009, through Mercury Records Nashville. It features five original songs penned by group members Jennifer Nettles and Kristian Bush and five traditional holiday songs that were also previously included as part of a Wal-Mart-exclusive re-release of the duo's 2006 album Enjoy the Ride.

== Critical reception ==
Thom Jurek of Allmusic gave a two-star review, calling it "an obvious, cloying exercise in marketing" and saying that it "holds little artistic merit." Paste critic Cory Albertson similarly said, "Gold and Green’s schizophrenic tone seems tailored for mass consumption by country radio and the soccer-mom set, but most other listeners will need far more eggnog to stomach such uninspired holiday cheer." Matt Bjorke reviewed it positively on Roughstock, saying, "City of Silver Dreams" could actually find itself a seminal holiday song like Joni Mitchell’s "River" as it tells a wonderfully soft and melodic story of New York City and the beauty of a new romance within the context of Christmas." The song was co-written with Lisa Carver and Ellis Paul.

== Track listing ==
No.	Title	Writer(s)	Length
1.	"City of Silver Dreams"	Kristian Bush; Jennifer Nettles; Lisa Carver; Ellis Paul	4:28
2.	"Winter Wonderland"	Felix Bernard; Richard B. Smith	2:27
3.	"Holly Jolly Christmas"	Johnny Marks	3:06
4.	"Coming Home"	Bush; Nettles	3:33
5.	"Gold and Green"	Bush; Nettles	4:02
6.	"Maybe Baby (New Year's Day)"	Bush; Nettles; Troy Bieser	5:02
7.	"Nuttin' for Christmas"	Sid Tepper; Roy C. Bennett	3:24
8.	"O Come, O Come, Emmanuel"	Traditional	4:08
9.	"Little Wood Guitar"	Bush; Paul	4:12
10.	"Silent Night"	Traditional	3:22

== Personnel ==
Sugarland

- Kristian Bush - acoustic guitar, electric guitar, mandolin, lead vocals, background vocals
- Jennifer Nettles - piano, lead vocals, background vocals

Additional Musicians

- David Angell - violin
- Robert Bailey - background vocals
- Thad Beaty - banjo, acoustic guitar, background vocals
- Brandon Bush - Hammond B-3 organ, keyboards, percussion, piano, string arrangements
- John Catchings - cello
- Annie Clements - background vocals
- Eric Darken - percussion
- David Davidson - violin
- Dan Dugmore - banjo, dobro, acoustic guitar, electric guitar, steel guitar
- Kim Fleming - background vocals
- Byron Gallimore - upright bass, electric guitar
- Vicki Hampton - background vocals
- Travis McNabb - drums, percussion
- Dow Tomlin - bass guitar
- Kris Wilkinson - viola
- Glenn Worf - bass guitar

== Chart performance ==
Album

Gold and Green debuted at No. 12 on the U.S. Billboard Top Country Albums chart; it has since risen to a peak of No. 3 on the chart. During the 2009 holiday season, the set sold approximately 256,000 copies.

Chart (2009)	Peak position
U.S. Billboard Top Country Albums	3
U.S. Billboard 200	24
U.S. Billboard Top Holiday Albums	3

End of year charts

Chart (2010)	Year-end 2010
US Billboard 200	163
US Billboard Top Country Albums	33
