= Man Like Me =

Studio album by Bobby Pinson
- Released: May 17, 2005
- Genre: Country
- Length: 46:13
- Label: RCA Nashville
- Producer: Bobby Pinson; Joe Scaife

Bobby Pinson chronology
I Mean Business (1994)	Man Like Me (2005)	Songs For Somebody (2007)

Man Like Me is the debut studio album by American country music artist Bobby Pinson. It was released in 2005 by RCA Nashville and peaked at #23 on the Billboard Top Country Albums chart. The album includes the singles "Don't Ask Me How I Know" and "Way Down."

== Track listing ==
No.	Title	Writer(s)	Length
1.	"I'm Fine Either Way"	Bobby Pinson, Jeremy Spillman	3:11
2.	"Nothin' Happens in This Town"	Pinson, Spillman	3:43
3.	"One More Believer"	Jim McBride, Pinson	3:35
4.	"Don't Ask Me How I Know"	Bart Butler, Brett Jones, Pinson	4:15
5.	"Man Like Me"	Bergsnes, Charlie Moore, Pinson	4:10
6.	"Started a Band"	Pinson, Matt Rossi	2:43
7.	"Ford Fairlane"	Bergsnes, Pinson	3:39
8.	"Shadows of the Heartland"	Bergsnes, Pinson	4:38
9.	"Way Down"	Pinson, Spillman	3:15
10.	"I Thought That's Who I Was"	Tommy Conners, Pinson	4:37
11.	"Time Well Spent"	Bergsnes, Jim McCormick, Pinson	5:40
12.	"Jesus Loves Me"	William Batchelder Bradbury, David Rutherford McGuire, Anna Bartlett Warner	2:46

== Personnel ==
- Bart Busch- background vocals
- John Catchings- cello
- Perry Coleman- background vocals
- Eric Darken- percussion
- Glen Duncan- fiddle
- David Grissom- electric guitar
- Mark Hill- bass guitar
- Troy Lancaster- electric guitar
- Blue Miller- background vocals
- Russ Pahl- steel guitar, dobro
- Billy Panda- acoustic guitar, mandocello, mandolin
- Lucy Pinson- background vocals
- Brian Pruitt- drums, percussion
- Mike Rojas- keyboards
- Russell Terrell- background vocals

== Chart performance ==
Chart (2005)	Peak position
U.S. Billboard Top Country Albums	23
U.S. Billboard 200	108
U.S. Billboard Top Heatseekers	1
