= Just Might (Make Me Believe) =

Single by Sugarland

from the album Twice the Speed of Life
- Released: September 19, 2005
- Recorded: 2004
- Genre: Country
- Length: 4:07
- Label: Mercury Nashville
- Songwriter: Kristen Hall
- Producer: Garth Fundis

Sugarland singles chronology
"Something More" (2005)	"Just Might (Make Me Believe)" (2005)	"Down in Mississippi (Up to No Good)" (2006)

Music video
- "Just Might (Make Me Believe)" at CMT.com

"Just Might (Make Me Believe)" is a song recorded by American country music group Sugarland. It was released in September 2005 as the third single from their debut album Twice the Speed of Life. In addition, it was the only single of their career to be written solely by ex-member Kristen Hall, who left the group in early 2006.

== Music video ==
A music video was released along with the song. It was shot completely in black and white, and features Jennifer Nettles roaming the countryside by herself, as well as all of the trio performing in a house. It was the last video to feature Kristen Hall before her departure.

== Chart performance ==
Chart (2005–2006)	Peak position
Canada Country (Radio & Records)	9
US Hot Country Songs (Billboard)	7
US Billboard Hot 100	60

=== Year-end charts ===
Chart (2006)	Position
US Country Songs (Billboard)	41

== Personnel ==
As listed in liner notes.

- Tom Bukovac – electric guitar
- Brandon Bush – organ
- Kristian Bush – mandolin, background vocals
- Dan Dugmore – pedal steel guitar
- Garth Fundis – background vocals
- Kristen Hall – acoustic guitar, background vocals
- Greg Morrow – drums
- Jennifer Nettles – lead vocals, background vocals
- Glenn Worf – bass guitar
