= Don't Ask Me How I Know =

Single by Bobby Pinson

from the album Man Like Me
- Released: February 2005
- Genre: Country
- Length: 4:15
- Label: RCA Nashville
- Songwriters: Bart Butler; Brett Jones; Bobby Pinson
- Producers: Bobby Pinson; Joe Scaife

Bobby Pinson singles chronology
"Don't Ask Me How I Know" (2005)	"Way Down" (2005)

"Don't Ask Me How I Know" is a debut song co-written and recorded by American country music artist Bobby Pinson. It was released in February 2005 as the first single from his debut album Man Like Me. Pinson co-wrote the song with Bart Butler and Brett Jones.

== Critical reception ==
Deborah Evans Price of Billboard gave the song a favorable review, saying that "Pinson's gritty, weathered vocals infuse the lyric with a straight-ahead honesty; it feels like he has lived every word."

== Music video ==
The music video was directed by David McClister and premiered in early 2005.

== Chart performance ==
"Don't Ask Me How I Know" debuted at number 50 on the U.S. Billboard Hot Country Songs chart for the week of February 19, 2005.

Chart (2005)	Peak position
US Hot Country Songs (Billboard)	16
US Billboard Hot 100	88
