= Love on the Inside =

Studio album by Sugarland
- Released: July 22, 2008
- Recorded: 2007–2008
- Genre: Country
- Length: 46:48
- Label: Mercury Nashville
- Producer: Byron Gallimore; Sugarland

Sugarland chronology
Enjoy the Ride (2006)	Love on the Inside (2008)	Live on the Inside (2009)

Singles from Love on the Inside
- 1. "All I Want to Do" Released: May 19, 2008; 2. "Already Gone" Released: September 8, 2008; 3. "It Happens" Released: February 9, 2009; 4. "Joey" Released: July 6, 2009

Love on the Inside is the third studio album by American country music duo Sugarland, first released on July 22, 2008, as a Deluxe Fan Edition, including five bonus tracks, with the standard edition one week later, on July 29, on Mercury Nashville Records. The album has produced three chart singles in "All I Want to Do", "Already Gone" and "It Happens", all number one hits on the Billboard country singles charts. The fourth single, "Joey", reached Top 20. The release of the fifth single "Keep You" was canceled. It is also the first album of the duo's career to reach Number One on Top Country Albums and The Billboard Top 200. The album has been certified 2× Platinum by the RIAA with sales of over 2 million copies in the United States.

== Release ==
The deluxe fan edition of Love on the Inside was released on July 22, 2008, which included 17 tracks in special packaging with an expanded CD booklet and access to download exclusive music video and behind the scenes footage. The deluxe fan edition was also released on vinyl record. Love on the Inside regular edition consisted of 12 songs and a regular CD booklet and was released on July 29.

== Content ==
"All I Want to Do", the album's lead-off single, debuted on the Hot Country Songs charts at No. 27 for the chart week of June 7, 2008 and became the duo's third Number One hit on that chart. Following it was "Already Gone" and "It Happens", which also went to Number One on the same chart in January and May 2009, respectively. All three of these singles were co-written by Sugarland's members (Kristian Bush and Jennifer Nettles) along with Bobby Pinson, with whom the duo also co-wrote their 2006 single "Want To". "Joey", which Sugarland wrote with Bill Anderson, was released in July 2009 as the fourth single.

Originally instead of "It Happens", "Love" was scheduled to be the third single from the album. A live music video was made to promote this song and was ranked No. 46 on GAC's Top 50 Videos of 2009 list. The song "Keep You" was planned as the fifth single from the album; although a music video was made for the song, its release to radio was cancelled.

Of the five bonus tracks included on the Deluxe Fan Edition, two are live recordings of cover songs: "Life in a Northern Town", originally by The Dream Academy, and "Come On Get Higher", originally by Matt Nathanson. The former, which features guest vocals from Little Big Town and Jake Owen, had charted earlier in 2008 (before the release of "All I Want to Do") based on unsolicited airplay that brought the live recording to No. 28 on the country charts. Footage of the live performance also aired as a music video on CMT.

== Chart performance ==
The album debuted at No. 2 on US Billboard 200 chart as well as No. 1 on Top Country Albums chart, with 313,734 copies sold in its first week. The album was held off the top spot by Miley Cyrus' album Breakout which sold 371,660 in its first week. The second week, the album climbed to No. 1 on US Billboard 200, becoming the duo's first No. 1 album. The album has been certified 2× Platinum by the Recording Industry Association of America with sales of over 2 million copies in the United States.

== Reception ==
Professional ratings
Aggregate scores
Source	Rating
Metacritic	83/100
Review scores
Source	Rating
AllMusic	4/5 stars
Blender	3.5/5 stars
Christgau’s Consumer Guide	(choice cut)
Entertainment Weekly	A−
Los Angeles Times	4/4 stars
The Phoenix	3.5/4 stars
PopMatters	7/10
Slant	3/5 stars
Tom Hull	B
USA Today	3/4 stars

Love on the Inside has a score of 83 out of 100 from Metacritic based on "universal acclaim" from many critics, with many reviews focusing on the song selection and Nettles' vocal performance, as well as the production of Byron Gallimore, who also produced the duo's 2006 album Enjoy the Ride. Thom Jurek of AllMusic gave the album four stars out of five, commends the use of minimal overdubs in the production. Of the song choices, he said, "While this set is saturated with hunger and ambition, it's also confident and sophisticated — the album sounds as if they meant every word but had a great time making it." He cited "We Run", "Joey" and "Love" as standout tracks. Chris Willman of Entertainment Weekly gave it an A− rating, saying that the album's ballads recalled Mary Chapin Carpenter and Rodney Crowell, while other tracks such as "All I Want to Do" were "goofy, arena-ready crowd-pleasers". Billboard critic Ken Tucker also gave a positive review, saying that Gallimore's production was "finely crafted" and that "All I Want to Do" was a "tantalizing tease" of the album's breadth.

Chuck Eddy of Blender magazine gave it three-and-a-half stars out of five, saying that the album recalled 1980s rock bands such as The Bangles, and that by doing so, it kept "their more tepid tendencies in check." The album received a three-star rating (out of five) from Slant Magazine reviewer Jonathan Keefe, who said that the songs recalled rock acts such as Def Leppard, R.E.M. and Concrete Blonde, and called "All I Want to Do" the "most grotesque thing shipped to radio since Jessica Simpson's cover of 'These Boots Are Made for Walkin''." He also said that "Genevieve", "Keep You" and "Already Gone" were the best songs of the duo's career and described the "Life in a Northern Town" cover favorably.

Matt C. was less favorable in his review for Engine 145, giving Love on the Inside a two-and-a-half star rating out of five. He considered the album's melodies, themes and instrumentations to be largely homogeneous, and criticized the ballads for containing underdeveloped choruses, but cited "Steve Earle" and "Very Last Country Song" as standout tracks.

== Track listing ==
No.	Title	Writer(s)	Length
1.	"All I Want to Do"	Jennifer Nettles, Kristian Bush, Bobby Pinson	3:33
2.	"It Happens"	Nettles, Bush, Pinson	3:01
3.	"We Run"	Nettles, Bush, Scooter Carusoe	3:56
4.	"Joey"	Nettles, Bush, Bill Anderson	4:02
5.	"Love"	Nettles, Bush, Tim Owens	4:29
6.	"Already Gone"	Nettles, Bush, Pinson	4:35
7.	"Genevieve"	Nettles, Bush	3:18
8.	"Keep You"	Nettles, Bush, Pinson	4:35
9.	"Take Me as I Am"	Nettles, Bush, Jeff Cohen	4:02
10.	"What I'd Give"	Nettles, Bush, Clayton Mitchell	5:57
11.	"Steve Earle"	Nettles, Bush	3:36
12.	"Very Last Country Song"	Nettles, Bush, Owens	3:44

Deluxe Edition bonus tracks
No.	Title	Writer(s)	Length
13.	"Fall into Me"	Nettles, Bush, Carusoe	4:45
14.	"Operation: Working Vacation"	Nettles, Bush, Owens	3:59
15.	"Wishing"	Nettles, Bush, Carusoe	4:11
16.	"Life in a Northern Town" (live, featuring Little Big Town and Jake Owen)	Gilbert Gabriel, Nick Laird-Clowes	4:15
17.	"Come On Get Higher" (live)	Matt Nathanson, Mark Weinberg	4:49

== Personnel ==
As listed in liner notes.

=== Sugarland ===
- Kristian Bush – background vocals, mandolin, acoustic guitar, harmonica; second lead vocals on "Love", "Life in a Northern Town" and "Come On Get Higher"
- Jennifer Nettles – lead vocals, background vocals, percussion, 12-string guitar

=== Additional musicians ===
- David Angell – violin
- Thad Beaty – acoustic guitar, background vocals
- Brandon Bush – clavinet, Hammond B-3 organ, accordion, synthesizer, piano, background vocals
- Paul Bushnell – bass guitar
- John Catchings – cello
- Matt Chamberlain – drums, percussion
- Annie Clements – bass guitar, background vocals
- David Davidson – violin
- Dan Dugmore – acoustic guitar, 12-string guitar, electric guitar, banjo, steel guitar, Dobro
- Shannon Forrest – drums, percussion
- Michael Landau – electric guitar
- Greg Morrow – drums
- Travis McNabb – drums, percussion
- Scott Patton – electric guitar, background vocals
- Kristin Wilkinson – viola
- "The Sugarland Family Singers" – background vocals on "All I Want to Do"

String orchestration on "Keep You" by Kristin Wilkinson, strings arranged by Brandon Bush.

== Chart performance ==
=== Weekly charts ===
Chart (2008)	Peak position
Australian Albums (ARIA)	74
Canadian Albums (Billboard)	4
US Billboard 200	1
US Top Country Albums (Billboard)	1

=== Year-end charts ===
Chart (2008)	Position
US Billboard 200	29
US Top Country Albums (Billboard)	6
Chart (2009)	Position
US Billboard 200	23
US Top Country Albums (Billboard)	5
Chart (2010)	Position
US Billboard 200	150
US Top Country Albums (Billboard)	57

== Certifications ==
Region	Certification
Canada (Music Canada)	Gold
United States (RIAA)	2× Platinum
