= Joey (Sugarland song) =

Single by Sugarland

from the album Love on the Inside
- Released: July 6, 2009
- Genre: Country
- Length: 4:02
- Label: Mercury Nashville
- Songwriters: Bill Anderson, Kristian Bush, Jennifer Nettles
- Producers: Byron Gallimore, Sugarland

Sugarland singles chronology
"It Happens" (2009)	"Joey" (2009)	"Stuck Like Glue" (2010)

"Joey" is a song co-written and recorded by American country music duo Sugarland. The duo's two members, Jennifer Nettles and Kristian Bush, wrote it along with Bill Anderson. It was released in July 2009 as the fourth single from the duo's album Love on the Inside. Sugarland's twelfth single release, it debuted at number 50 on the Billboard Hot Country Songs charts in July 2009.

== Content ==
"Joey" was written by Sugarland's two members, Kristian Bush and Jennifer Nettles, along with country singer Bill Anderson. The song is a mid-tempo ballad, backed primarily by acoustic guitar and organ. In it, the narrator blames herself when her love, a teenager named Joey, is killed in a car accident. The lyrics are a series of "what if"s, with the narrator asking what would have happened if she had taken the keys and driven him home. In the chorus, she speaks to Joey, apologizing and hoping he can hear her message. In the second verse, she asks what would have happened had she never fallen in love with him at all. Nettles said that when she, Bush, and Anderson were writing the song, Anderson compared it to the teenage tragedy songs of the 1950s and 1960s.

On the CD-DVD package Live on the Inside, Sugarland opens the song with a cover version of R.E.M.'s "Nightswimming". A performance of "Nightswimming/Joey" received rotation on CMT as a music video for the song.

== Critical reception ==
The song received mostly positive feedback from critics. Chris Willman of Entertainment Weekly cited the song as a standout track in his review of the album, saying that it showed that the duo is "on surer footing when they get down to emotional specifics." AllMusic critic Thom Jurek described it favorably in his review of the album as well, saying, "The emotion in Nettles' voice — especially as it is buoyed by Bush's in the refrain and the wide-open ringing guitars and mandolins — is devastating." Bobby Peacock of Roughstock reviewed the song positively, saying that its lyrics were "just vague enough to be mysterious" and that it was a "risky" single release because it was a ballad being released in the summertime. Melinda Newman of HitFix also gave a favorable review, describing the song as a "country gothic mid-tempo about loss and regret," saying that it had an alternative music sound similar to R.E.M.

Dan Milliken of Country Universe gave a B− review. He said that the song's chorus "delivers practically nothing" compared to the verses, whose "what if" structure he considered unique. Jim Malec of The 9513 gave a thumbs-down rating, calling the song "a thematically schizophrenic lyric that suffers from a debilitating lack of focus." He also said that Nettles' vocals were not as "raw" as other similar songs by the duo.

== Personnel ==
The following musicians perform on this track:

- Brandon Bush - Hammond B-3 organ
- Kristian Bush – background vocals and acoustic guitar
- Paul Bushnell – bass guitar
- Dan Dugmore – 12-string guitar and steel guitar
- Shannon Forrest – drums
- Michael Landau – electric guitar
- Jennifer Nettles – lead and background vocals

== Chart performance ==
"Joey" debuted at number 50 on the U.S. Billboard Hot Country Songs chart for the week of July 4, 2009. It reached a peak of number 17 in September 2009, becoming their first single to miss the Top 10 since "Down in Mississippi (Up to No Good)" also reached number 17 in 2006. The song also debuted at number 98 on the U.S. Billboard Hot 100 in late August 2009, and peaked at number 89.

Chart (2009)	Peak position
Canada Country (Billboard)	6
US Billboard Hot 100	89
US Hot Country Songs (Billboard)	17
