= Bobby Pinson =

American singer-songwriter (born 1972)

- Born: Bobby Olen Pinson; August 10, 1972 (age 54)
- Origin: Tulsa, Oklahoma, United States
- Genre: Country
- Occupation: Singer-songwriter
- Instruments: Vocals rhythm guitar
- Years active: 2001–present
- Labels: RCA Nashville, Vision, Cash Daddy
- Website: https://bobbypinsonmusic.com/

Bobby Olen Pinson (born August 10, 1972) is an American country music artist. Signed to RCA Nashville in 2005, Pinson made his debut that year with his album Man Like Me. Its lead-off single, "Don't Ask Me How I Know", peaked at No. 16 on the Hot Country Songs charts, and was his only Top 40 country hit. Two more albums, I Mean Business and Songs for Somebody, followed in late 2005 and 2007, respectively. He has also written several singles for other artists, including four Number One hits for Toby Keith and another four for Sugarland.

== Biography ==
Bobby Pinson was born August 10, 1972, in Tulsa, Oklahoma but raised in Panhandle, Texas, United States. Influenced by poet and songwriter Shel Silverstein, Pinson began entering writing and storytelling contests, and by high school, he began writing songs as well, citing Johnny Cash, Bruce Springsteen and Steve Earle as influences. Because his father was a football coach, Pinson was moved throughout the state of Texas, and played football himself in high school.

After graduating from Claremore High School in Oklahoma, Pinson served in the United States Army, in which he served for three years. While in the Army, he founded a band which began playing at local venues in California. In California, he met songwriters Larry Boone and Paul Nelson, who suggested that he move to Nashville, Tennessee, which he did in 1996. Pinson worked several odd jobs in Nashville, including delivering phone books and loading railroad ties for the Santa Fe Railroad.

== Musical career ==
By 1999, he was signed to a publishing contract with Sony/ATV Music. Artists who recorded his material included Blake Shelton, Marty Stuart and LeAnn Rimes. His first single release as a songwriter was Tracy Lawrence's 2000 single "Unforgiven", and three years later, McHayes (a duo composed of Wade Hayes and Mark McClurg) charted with "It Doesn't Mean I Don't Love You", which Pinson co-wrote with Trent Willmon. Pinson also co-wrote Marty Stuart's 2003 single "If There Ain't, There Ought'a Be", and Willmon later charted with one of Pinson's songs, "The Good Life", in early 2005 from his self-titled debut album.

After playing at several artist and songwriter showcases, Pinson was discovered by producer Joe Scaife, who helped him sign to a contract with RCA Records Nashville. His debut single, "Don't Ask Me How I Know", charted in early 2005 and reached a peak of No. 16 on the Billboard country charts. This was the first single from his debut album Man Like Me. The album's second single, "Way Down", peaked at No. 58, and by the end of 2005, Pinson exited RCA's roster. He did, however, re-release an independent album originally recorded in 1994 called I Mean Business.

Despite the loss of his record deal, Pinson continued to write songs for other singers. Lawrence charted another Pinson co-write, "If I Don't Make It Back", in 2006. His first Number One as a songwriter came in late 2006, when Sugarland topped the Billboard country charts with "Want To", which he co-wrote with the duo's members, Kristian Bush and Jennifer Nettles. Trent Tomlinson also released a Pinson co-write, "One Wing in the Fire", in late 2006. He released a third album, Songs for Somebody, in 2007 on an independent label. This album included his own rendition of "If I Don't Make It Back". That same year, two more songs that he co-wrote entered the charts: "What I Did Last Night" by Catherine Britt and "We Weren't Crazy" by Josh Gracin.

In 2008, Pinson also began writing with Toby Keith, including the singles "She's a Hottie", "She Never Cried in Front of Me", "Lost You Anyway", "Made in America", "Beers Ago", "I Like Girls That Drink Beer" and "Shut Up and Hold On". "35 MPH Town". "She Never Cried in Front of Me" and "Lost You Anyway" were released from Keith's 2008 album That Don't Make Me a Bad Guy, on which all but three songs were co-written by Keith and Pinson. He also has several cuts on Sugarland's 2008 album Love on the Inside, including its first three singles: "All I Want to Do", "Already Gone" and "It Happens", all of which were also Number One hits. Pinson and Terry McBride also co-wrote Brooks & Dunn's 2009 single "Honky Tonk Stomp". Pinson, Eric Church, Jeff Hyde and Clint Daniels also co-wrote Eric Church's 2019 single "Some of It". Pinson and Arlo Gilliam also co-wrote Emerson Drive's 2012 single "She's My Kind of Crazy". Pinson, Rhett Akins and Dallas Davidson also co-wrote Aaron Lewis's 2013 single "Granddaddy's Gun". Pinson, Brantley Gilbert, Blake Chaffin also co-wrote Brantley Gilbert's 2017 single "The Ones That Like Me".

== Discography ==
=== Studio albums ===
Title	Album details	Peak chart positions		
Title	Album details	US Country	US	US Heat
I Mean Business	Release date: 1994; Label: Vision	—	—	—
Man Like Me	Release date: May 17, 2005; Label: RCA Nashville	23	108	1
Songs For Somebody	Release date: May 15, 2007; Label: Cash Daddy	—	—	—
"—" denotes releases that did not chart

=== Singles ===
Year	Single	Peak chart positions		Album
Year	Single	US Country	US	Album
2005	"Don't Ask Me How I Know"	16	88	Man Like Me
2005	"Way Down"	58	—	Man Like Me
2006	"Childhood Days"	—	—	I Mean Business
2007	"Past Comin' Back"	—	—	Songs For Somebody
"—" denotes releases that did not chart

=== Music videos ===
Year	Video	Director
2005	"Don't Ask Me How I Know"	David McClister
