= Already Gone (Sugarland song) =

Single by Sugarland

from the album Love on the Inside
- Released: September 8, 2008
- Genre: Country
- Length: 4:36
- Label: Mercury Nashville
- Songwriters: Jennifer Nettles; Kristian Bush; Bobby Pinson
- Producers: Byron Gallimore; Sugarland

Sugarland singles chronology
"All I Want to Do" (2008)	"Already Gone" (2008)	"It Happens" (2009)

Music video
- "Already Gone" at CMT.com

"Already Gone" is a song co-written and recorded by American country music duo Sugarland. It was released in September 2008 as the second single from their album Love on the Inside, which was released on July 29, 2008. Sugarland's members, Kristian Bush and Jennifer Nettles, wrote the song with Bobby Pinson, with whom the duo also co-wrote two of their previous singles, "Want To" and "All I Want to Do".

== Content ==
"Already Gone" is a mid-tempo ballad set in compound duple meter, mostly accompanied by piano and mandolin, the latter of which is played by Bush. The female narrator describes her life and always passing the good moments by. The song describes the narrator's relationship with her mother and a relationship with her now ex-boyfriend and the final encounter she has with him before moving on.

According to Country Weekly magazine, Bobby Pinson met Nettles and Bush at their hotel in Buffalo, New York in the middle of their 2007 tour. Nettles and Bush played a melody that "sounds like [Pinson]." Nettles added the final verse about her divorce from Todd Van Sickle.

== Critical reception ==
Engine 145 critic Brady Vercher gave the song a "thumbs down" rating. Although said as "a little more substance" than its predecessor "All I Want to Do", he also thought that more emphasis was placed on constructing an interesting melody than creating a narrative that is anything more than average.

== Music video ==
A music video for the song was released on iTunes a few days before its official release to CMT and GAC on September 5, 2008. The video starts off with Nettles and Bush in a bed of old, vintage cars with a sunset in the background. It later captures a young girl in the driver's side of one of those cars, which turns out to be Nettles at the end. Nettles sings on the hood of one car, while Bush plays mandolin on the hood of a different car.

== Chart performance ==
The song debuted at #47 on the Hot Country Songs chart the week of the song's release on September 8, 2008. On the chart week of January 17, 2009, it became the duo's fourth Number One song in the U.S..

Chart (2008–2009)	Peak Position
Canada Country (Billboard)	1
Canada Hot 100 (Billboard)	57
US Billboard Hot 100	41
US Hot Country Songs (Billboard)	1

=== Year-end charts ===
Chart (2009)	Position
US Country Songs (Billboard)	58
