= Something More (Sugarland song) =

Single by Sugarland

from the album Twice the Speed of Life
- Released: April 11, 2005
- Genre: Country
- Length: 3:36
- Label: Mercury Nashville
- Songwriters: Kristian Bush; Kristen Hall; Jennifer Nettles
- Producer: Garth Fundis

Sugarland singles chronology
"Baby Girl" (2004)	"Something More" (2005)	"Just Might (Make Me Believe)" (2005)

Music video
- "Something More" at CMT.com

"Something More" is a song written and recorded by American country music group Sugarland. It was released in April 2005 as the second single from their debut album Twice the Speed of Life. Like its predecessor "Baby Girl", "Something More" was a number 2 hit on the Hot Country Songs charts for 5 weeks.

== Music video ==
A music video was released for the song, directed by Paul Boyd. In the video, the members of Sugarland are seen driving down a dirt road in a Cadillac. It breaks down and they stand around the smoking vehicle performing the song, until a truck drives up, and Nettles alone hops into the back. Nettles continues hitch-hiking while on the dirt road, getting on a motorcycle and in a station wagon. Throughout this, scenes of Nettles on a beach at sunset are mixed in.

== Chart performance ==
Chart (2005)	Peak position
Canada Country (Radio & Records)	1
US Hot Country Songs (Billboard)	2
US Billboard Hot 100	35
US Billboard Pop 100	69

=== Year-end charts ===
Chart (2005)	Position
US Country Songs (Billboard)	4

== Personnel ==
As listed in liner notes.

- Tom Bukovac – electric guitar
- Brandon Bush – organ
- Kristian Bush – mandolin, background vocals
- Dan Dugmore – pedal steel guitar
- Kristen Hall – acoustic guitar, background vocals
- Greg Morrow – drums
- Jennifer Nettles – lead vocals
- Glenn Worf – bass guitar
