= Settlin' =

Single by Sugarland

from the album Enjoy the Ride
- Released: January 1, 2007
- Recorded: 2006
- Genre: Country
- Length: 3:27 (album version); 3:25 (edit)
- Label: Mercury Nashville
- Songwriters: Jennifer Nettles; Kristian Bush; Tim Owens
- Producers: Byron Gallimore; Sugarland

Sugarland singles chronology
"Want To" (2006)	"Settlin'" (2007)	"Everyday America" (2007)

Music video
- "Settlin'" at CMT.com

"Settlin'" is a song co-written and recorded by American country music duo Sugarland. It was released in January 2007 as the second single from their album Enjoy the Ride, and their second consecutive number one hit. The song reached the top of the Billboard Hot Country Songs chart. It was written by Jennifer Nettles, Kristian Bush and Tim Owens. It was the theme song for the 2007 ACC tournament.

== Music video ==
The music video was directed by Paul Boyd and premiered in January 2007. It was filmed in downtown Atlanta, Georgia. It is a fairly simple video, featuring the duo Jennifer Nettles singing into a microphone performing the song against an all-white moving background on a rotating swivel circular stage with a full band. During the second verse, audience members are revealed and sing and dance to the song as the duo perform.

== CD single ==
1. "Settlin'" (edit) – 3:25
2. "Settlin'" (video) – 3:35

== Chart performance ==
On the May 19, 2007 chart, "Settlin'" received the exact amount of airplay among country radio stations on the Billboard survey as Rascal Flatts' "Stand", the song which held the number one position the week prior. This was the first such occurrence in the history of the Hot Country Songs charts. According to rules established by Billboard, a tie in airplay is broken by whichever of the two songs had a greater gain in airplay compared to the previous week; as "Settlin'" had increased in airplay over the previous week while "Stand" had decreased, "Settlin'" was therefore declared the number one song on that week's chart.

Chart (2007)	Peak position
Canada Country (Billboard)	1
Canada Hot 100 (Billboard)	47
US Hot Country Songs (Billboard)	1
US Billboard Hot 100	54
US Billboard Pop 100	93

=== Year-end charts ===
Chart (2007)	Position
US Country Songs (Billboard)	10

== Personnel ==
- Tom Bukovac – electric guitar, synthesizer
- Kristian Bush – acoustic guitar, background vocals
- Dan Dugmore – electric guitar, steel guitar
- Kenny Greenberg – electric guitar
- Tony Harrell – organ
- Greg Morrow – drums, percussion
- Jennifer Nettles – lead vocals, background vocals
- Glenn Worf – bass guitar
