= It Happens =

Single by Sugarland

from the album Love on the Inside
- Released: February 9, 2009
- Genre: Country, comedy
- Length: 3:02
- Label: Mercury Nashville
- Songwriters: Kristian Bush; Jennifer Nettles; Bobby Pinson
- Producers: Byron Gallimore; Sugarland

Sugarland singles chronology
"Already Gone" (2008)	"It Happens" (2009)	"Joey" (2009)

"It Happens" is a song co-written and recorded by American country music duo Sugarland. It was released in February 2009 as the third single from their album Love on the Inside. The duo's members, Jennifer Nettles and Kristian Bush, wrote the song along with Bobby Pinson, with whom the duo also co-wrote the album's first two singles, "All I Want to Do" and "Already Gone". To date, this is Sugarland’s last number one song.

== Content ==
"It Happens" is an up-tempo accompanied by steel-string acoustic guitar and electric guitar. In it, the female narrator (Jennifer Nettles, the duo's lead singer) tells of oversleeping and coming to work late. She borrows her neighbor's car to drive to "Wally World" in the second verse, and is involved in an accident with her ex and his new girlfriend. A "Pssh" sound precedes the phrase "It happens" on all but the second chorus, so as to make the phrase sound like "shit happens".

== Critical reception ==
In his review of the album, Entertainment Weekly critic Chris Willman said that the song recalled "cheekily potty-mouthed hits like Blake Shelton's 'Some Beach'." Thom Jurek of Allmusic cited the song as an example of the album's personal influence, as Nettles had gone through a divorce while writing it. Matt Bjorke described the song favorably as well in his review for the Roughstock website. He called it "a playful, irreverent song" and considered it a better single choice than "Love" (which was originally slated as the album's third single), because he thought that "It Happens" showed a more traditionally country sound than "Love" did.

Matt C., in his review of the album for Engine 145, said that Nettles seemed to show more interest in "frivolous tracks" such as "It Happens" as compared to the more serious tracks. Country Universe critic Blake Boldt gave it a C rating, saying that it was a "needless novelty" but a "necessary evil in a corporate radio world".

== Awards ==
"It Happens" was nominated at the 52nd Grammy Awards for Best Country Performance by a Duo or Group, but lost to Lady Antebellum's "I Run to You."

== Personnel ==
The following musicians play on this track.

- Brandon Bush – Hammond B-3 organ
- Kristian Bush – acoustic guitar, background vocals
- Paul Bushnell – bass guitar
- Dan Dugmore – acoustic guitar
- Shannon Forrest – drums, percussion
- Michael Landau – electric guitar
- Jennifer Nettles – lead vocals, background vocals

== Chart performance ==
"It Happens" debuted at #40 on the Billboard Hot Country Songs charts dated for February 28, 2009. The song became the duo's fifth U.S. Number One song on the chart week of May 23, 2009, holding that position for two weeks.

Chart (2009)	Peak Position
Canada Country (Billboard)	1
Canada Hot 100 (Billboard)	47
US Billboard Hot 100	33
US Hot Country Songs (Billboard)	1

=== Year-end charts ===
Chart (2009)	Position
US Country Songs (Billboard)	33
US Radio Songs (Billboard)	88
