= Everyday America =

Single by Sugarland

from the album Enjoy the Ride
- Released: May 21, 2007
- Genre: Country
- Length: 3:53
- Label: Mercury Nashville
- Songwriters: Jennifer Nettles; Kristian Bush; Lisa Carver
- Producers: Byron Gallimore; Kristian Bush; Jennifer Nettles

Sugarland singles chronology
"Settlin'" (2007)	"Everyday America" (2007)	"Stay" (2007)

Music video
- "Everyday America" at CMT.com

"Everyday America" is a song co-written and recorded by American country music duo Sugarland. It was released on May 21, 2007, as the third single from their second album Enjoy the Ride). It peaked at number 9 on the Billboard Hot Country Songs charts. The song was also played on the ABC television series Good Morning America from May to September 2007. It was written by Jennifer Nettles, Kristian Bush and Lisa Carver.

== Content ==
The song is a moderate up-tempo that chronicles the lives of two characters — a female character who "couldn't wait to get out" of the small town in which she was raised, and a male character who was once a football star. Their lives are also exemplified as being examples of modern American people's lives, as stated in the chorus. Sugarland debuted the song in May 2007 at the Academy of Country Music awards.

== Critical reception ==
Thom Jurek of Allmusic described the song favorably in his review of the album, saying that "The looped beats, synths, and organ lines at the beginning of "Everyday America" offer a slippery urban groove to the country mix. There's rhythm here that any soul singer could get behind, and the voices of Nettles and Bush entwine to take in the whole of what the words of that title mean—no matter how small the microcosmic glance at the scenery is." Matt C., a critic for Engine 145, gave "Everyday America" a thumbs-down rating. He called it "contextless slice-of-life" that sounded more appropriate for a television commercial.

== Music video ==
The song's music video was directed by Rocky Schenck. It features Bush and Nettles performing the song in a Los Angeles grocery store. It was filmed in 4 hours in Los Angeles one night. The store stayed open during the shoot.

== Use on Good Morning America ==
"Everyday America" was used by the American Broadcasting Company for their news series Good Morning America from May to September 2007. The show used the song as the theme for a special on-air campaign entitled "GMA Is Here".

== Chart performance ==
Chart (2007)	Peak position
Canada Country (Billboard)	19
US Hot Country Songs (Billboard)	9
US Billboard Hot 100	68

=== Year-end charts ===
Chart (2007)	Position
US Country Songs (Billboard)	49

== Personnel ==
The following musicians perform on this song.

- Thad Beaty – electric guitar
- Brandon Bush – organ, Clavinet, drum loops, percussion
- Kristian Bush – acoustic guitar, mandolin, background vocals
- Annie Clements – bass guitar, background vocals
- Jarrod Johnson – drums
- Jennifer Nettles – lead vocals
- Scott Patton – electric guitar
