= Down in Mississippi (Up to No Good) =

Single by Sugarland

from the album Twice the Speed of Life
- Released: March 13, 2006
- Genre: Country
- Length: 2:51
- Label: Mercury Nashville
- Songwriters: Kristian Bush; Kristen Hall; Jennifer Nettles
- Producer: Garth Fundis

Sugarland singles chronology
"Just Might (Make Me Believe)" (2005)	"Down in Mississippi (Up to No Good)" (2006)	"Want To" (2006)

"Down in Mississippi (Up to No Good)" is a song written and recorded by American country music group Sugarland. It was released in March 2006 as the fourth and final single from the album Twice the Speed of Life, Sugarland's only album as a trio. Starting with the next single, "Want To", Sugarland has comprised Kristian Bush and Jennifer Nettles, with Kristen Hall departing.

== Critical reception ==
Dave Tianen of the Milwaukee Journal-Sentinel wrote that the song "has obviously connected as a girls' night out anthem".

== Performances ==
Sugarland performed the song at the 2006 CMT Music Awards and Academy of Country Music awards.

== Chart performance ==
"Down in Mississippi" debuted on the Hot Country Songs charts dated for the week ending March 25, 2006. It spent 20 weeks on the chart and peaked at number 17. The song also peaked at number 1 on Bubbling Under Hot 100.

Chart (2006)	Peak position
Canada Country (Billboard)	24
US Hot Country Songs (Billboard)	17
US Bubbling Under Hot 100 (Billboard)	1
