= Twice the Speed of Life =

Studio album by Sugarland
- Released: October 26, 2004
- Recorded: 2003–2004
- Genre: Country
- Length: 41:45
- Label: Mercury Nashville
- Producer: Garth Fundis

Sugarland chronology
Twice the Speed of Life (2004)	Enjoy the Ride (2006)

Singles from Twice the Speed of Life
- 1. "Baby Girl" Released: July 12, 2004; 2. "Something More" Released: April 11, 2005; 3. "Just Might (Make Me Believe)" Released: September 19, 2005; 4. "Down in Mississippi (Up to No Good)" Released: March 13, 2006

Professional ratings
Review scores
Source	Rating
About.com	5/5 stars
AllMusic	3.5/5 stars
Plugged In (publication)	(mixed)

Twice the Speed of Life is the debut studio album by American country music group Sugarland, released on October 26, 2004, through Mercury Nashville Records. The album peaked at number 16 on the Billboard 200 and number three on the Top Country Albums charts. It was certified triple platinum by the Recording Industry Association of America (RIAA). The album features the singles "Baby Girl", "Something More", "Just Might (Make Me Believe)", and "Down in Mississippi (Up to No Good)", which peaked at number 2, number 2, number 7, and number 17 respectively on the Billboard Hot Country Songs charts. Twice the Speed of Life was Sugarland's only album as a trio, before Kristen Hall left in December 2005.

== Singles ==
On July 12, 2004, the first single "Baby Girl" was released. The song reached number 38 on the Billboard Hot 100 and number two on the Hot Country Songs charts. It was also certified gold by the Recording Industry Association of America (RIAA). "Something More" is the second single from the album. It was released on April 11, 2005. The song peaked at number 35 on the Billboard Hot 100 and number two on the Hot Country Albums charts. It was also certified gold by the RIAA. "Just Might (Make Me Believe)" was released on September 15, 2005, it peaked at number 60 on the Billboard Hot 100 and number seven on the Hot Country Songs charts. It was also certified gold. The album's last single "Down in Mississippi (Up to No Good)" was released on March 13, 2006. Unlike the album's other singles, the song failed to chart on the Hot 100 but peaked at number 17 on the Hot Country Songs chart respectively.

== Accolades ==
The group received a nomination for Best New Artist at the Grammy Awards of 2006. They were also nominated for New Artist of the Year at the 2005 American Music Awards. In 2006, the group was also nominated for New Vocal Duo or Group of the Year at the 2006 Country Music Association Awards.

== Commercial performance ==
Twice the Speed of Life peaked at number 16 on the US Billboard 200 and number three on the Top Country Albums charts. The album spent a total of 92 weeks on the Billboard 200 and 104 weeks on the Top Country Albums chart. The album was eventually certified triple platinum by the Recording Industry Association of America (RIAA) for sales of over three million copies in the United States.

== Track listing ==
No.	Title	Writer(s)	Length
1.	"Something More"	Kristian Bush; Kristen Hall; Jennifer Nettles	3:36
2.	"Baby Girl"	Bush; Hall; Nettles; Troy Bieser	4:12
3.	"Hello"	Bush; Hall; Nettles	3:53
4.	"Tennessee"	Bush; Hall; David LaBruyere	2:58
5.	"Just Might (Make Me Believe)"	Hall	4:07
6.	"Down in Mississippi (Up to No Good)"	Bush; Hall; Nettles	2:51
7.	"Fly Away"	Bush; Hall; Corri English; Billy Gewin	3:36
8.	"Speed of Life"	Hall; Nettles	4:07
9.	"Small Town Jericho"	Bush; Hall; Nettles	4:03
10.	"Time, Time, Time"	Bush; Hall; Nettles	3:29
11.	"Stand Back Up"	Bush; Hall; Nettles	4:48

== Personnel ==
As listed in liner notes.

=== Sugarland ===
- Kristian Bush – background vocals (except 9), mandolin (except 3), acoustic guitar (3)
- Kristen Hall – background vocals (all tracks), acoustic guitar (all tracks)
- Jennifer Nettles – lead vocals (all tracks), background vocals (2, 3, 5–9)

=== Additional musicians ===
- Tom Bukovac – electric guitar (1, 2, 4–8), acoustic guitar (3)
- Steve Brewster – percussion (9)
- Brandon Bush – organ (1, 2, 5, 7–9), electric piano (3, 6)
- Chad Cromwell – drums (2)
- Dan Dugmore – pedal steel guitar (1, 2, 4–6, 8–10), lap steel guitar (2), acoustic guitar (9, 11), electric guitar (2), Dobro (3), banjo (9)
- Garth Fundis – background vocals (5)
- Rob Hajacos – fiddle (4, 6, 7, 11)
- Greg Morrow – drums (except 2 and 11), percussion (3), tambourine (2, 4, 7, 8), shaker (7), maracas (8)
- Dave Pomeroy – bass guitar (4, 7)
- Garrison Starr – background vocals (9)
- Kenny Vaughan – electric guitar (10)
- Glenn Worf – bass guitar (1–3, 5, 6, 8–10)

== Charts ==
=== Weekly charts ===
Chart (2004–05)	Peak position
US Billboard 200	16
US Top Country Albums (Billboard)	3
US Heatseekers Albums (Billboard)	2

=== Year-end charts ===
Chart (2005)	Position
US Billboard 200	50
US Top Country Albums (Billboard)	10

Chart (2006)	Position
US Billboard 200	51
US Top Country Albums (Billboard)	15

== Certifications ==
Region	Certification	Certified units/sales
Canada (Music Canada)	Gold	50,000^{^}
United States (RIAA)	3× Platinum	3,000,000^{^}
^{^} Shipments figures based on certification alone.
