= Stay (Sugarland song) =

2007 song by Sugarland

Single by Sugarland

from the album Enjoy the Ride
- Released: September 10, 2007
- Genre: Country
- Length: 4:44
- Label: Mercury Nashville
- Songwriter: Jennifer Nettles
- Producers: Byron Gallimore; Kristian Bush; Jennifer Nettles

Sugarland singles chronology
"Everyday America" (2007)	"Stay" (2007)	"All I Want to Do" (2008)

"Stay" is a song recorded by American country music duo Sugarland. It was released in September 2007 as the fourth and final single from their album Enjoy the Ride (see 2006 in country music). Overall, the song is the group's eighth single to enter the Billboard Hot Country Songs charts, where it reached a peak position of #2 for four weeks, stuck behind Taylor Swift's "Our Song", and has become their signature song. The music video for "Stay" was ranked #10 on CMT's 100 Greatest Videos.

In addition, it is the first song in Sugarland's career to be written solely by Jennifer Nettles.

"Stay" was certified Gold by the RIAA on February 21, 2008. It was later Sugarland's first single to earn a Platinum certification on March 24, 2009. It reached over two million in sales in 2013, and has sold 2,219,000 copies as of February 2016.

"Stay" was voted the fourth greatest video of the decade on CMT.com

== Content ==
"Stay" is a ballad of infidelity, taking the perspective of the mistress of a man who is cheating on his wife. It begins with the mistress's insistence that the man stay with her — even if his wife should call and ask where he is — because she (the mistress) is "so tired of being lonely". Although the man tells her that he will leave his wife for her, she refuses to believe him, telling him that "it's too much pain to have to bear / To love a man you have to share".

In the third verse, the mistress then changes her mind; according to Nettles, she (the woman in the song) "has her own sense of redemption and realizes she deserves more than being with someone who will never be fully hers". This change is revealed in the final chorus.

In the song, Nettles' vocals are accompanied by Kristian Bush on acoustic guitar; unlike most other Sugarland songs, Bush does not sing harmony vocals. The only other instrumentation in the song is an organ, played by Bush's brother Brandon.

== Inspiration ==
According to Nettles, "Stay" was inspired by Reba McEntire's 1986 single "Whoever's in New England", a ballad in which a wife addresses her unfaithful husband. "Whoever's in New England" was, in turn, based upon "Weekend in New England," a pop hit by Barry Manilow. After hearing "Whoever's in New England," Nettles thought that it would be an original approach to take the perspective of the "other woman" (i.e., the mistress), as very few country songs had ever done so. Once she decided to take that perspective, the song "practically wrote itself".

== Awards ==
"Stay" has received numerous awards for Sugarland and Jennifer Nettles, as a writer. Most notable has been at the 51st Grammy Awards where it won "Best Country Performance by a Duo or Group with Vocal" and "Best Country Song". At the 2008 ACM Awards it won two awards for "Song of the Year" and "Single of the Year". At the 2008 CMA Awards it won "Song of the Year" and at the 2008 CMT Music Awards it won "Duo Video of the Year".

== Music video ==
Directed by Shaun Silva, the video for "Stay," features Nettles & Bush performing the song in front of an all-black background. According to Nettles, "We wanted to keep the video simple, but still show emotion, so we decided to base the video on performance, and that's all."

== Chart performance ==
Chart (2007–2008)	Peak position
Canada Country (Billboard)	2
Canada Hot 100 (Billboard)	48
US Hot Country Songs (Billboard)	2
US Billboard Hot 100	32
US Billboard Pop 100	36

=== Year-end charts ===
Chart (2008)	Position
US Country Songs (Billboard)	44

== Ronan Keating version ==
"Stay"

Single by Ronan Keating

from the album Winter Songs
- Released: November 12, 2009
- Recorded: 2009
- Genre: Pop
- Length: 4:36
- Label: Polydor
- Songwriter: Jennifer Nettles
- Producer: Stephen Lipson

Ronan Keating singles chronology
"This Is Your Song" (2009)	"Stay" (2009)	"It's Only Christmas" (2009)

In 2009, Irish pop singer and Boyzone frontman Ronan Keating released a cover version of the song as the lead single from his sixth studio album, Winter Songs. It was not an international hit like his previous singles, and his version of the song failed to make the Top 100 of the UK Singles Chart, peaking at #129 after one week on the chart.

=== Track listing ===
1. "Stay" (Radio Edit) - 3:17

=== Chart performance ===
Chart (2009)	Peak position
UK Singles Chart	129
