= Baby Girl (Sugarland song) =

Single by Sugarland

from the album Twice the Speed of Life
- B-side: "Stand Back Up"
- Released: July 12, 2004
- Studio: Sound Emporium Studios (Nashville, TN)
- Genre: Country
- Length: 4:13
- Label: Mercury Nashville
- Songwriters: Kristian Bush; Kristen Hall; Jennifer Nettles; Troy Bieser
- Producer: Garth Fundis

Sugarland singles chronology
"Baby Girl" (2004)	"Something More" (2005)

Music video
- "Baby Girl" at CMT.com

"Baby Girl" is a song co-written and recorded by American country music group Sugarland. Originally released in 2003 as part of Premium Quality Tunes, it was re-released in July 2004 as the first single from the group's debut album Twice the Speed of Life.

The single reached a peak position of number 2 on the Billboard Hot Country Singles & Tracks (now Hot Country Songs) charts in April 2005. The song spent a total of 46 weeks on the country music charts; setting a new record for the longest chart run since the inception of Nielsen SoundScan digital chart tabulation in 1990. In addition, "Baby Girl" became the highest-peaking debut single for a country music group in 14 years. It was written by group members Jennifer Nettles, Kristian Bush, and Kristen Hall, along with Troy Bieser.

== Content ==
"Baby Girl" is about a struggling female musician relying on help from her parents prior to her becoming successful. Lead singer Jennifer Nettles thought that the song "could apply to anyone out there making it but needs a little help from mom and dad."

In 2024, Rolling Stone ranked the song at number 170 on its 200 Greatest Country Songs of All Time ranking. Kevin John Coyne of Country Universe reviewed the song favorably, praising the group's harmonies. He also thought the song would be appealing to women aspiring to become country music singers.

== Chart performance ==
"Baby Girl" entered the Billboard Hot Country Singles & Tracks chart at number 56 on the chart week of July 24, 2004. The single reached its peak position of number 2 on the chart week of April 2, 2005, a position that it held for two weeks. "Baby Girl" became the highest-charting debut single for a country group since 1991.

The single set a new record for the longest chart run since the inception of Nielsen SoundScan in 1990, spending 46 weeks on the charts. Joel Whitburn's book Hot Country Songs 1944-2008 contradicts this record, citing Gary Allan's "Right Where I Need to Be" as the record-holder for this era with a 48-week run. This discrepancy is due to a change on the chart dated January 13, 2001; as part of the chart's reduction from 75 spaces to 60, active songs at the time had their total number of weeks adjusted to count only weeks spent at number 60 or higher, thus reducing the counted number of weeks for "Right Where I Need to Be" from 23 to 16. In the same book, "Baby Girl" is tied with Diamond Rio's 2002 single "Beautiful Mess" and Carrie Underwood's "Before He Cheats" as the second-longest chart run in this era, Underwood's chart run having come in 2006 and 2007.

The song has sold 827,000 copies in the US as of April 2013.

Chart (2004–2005)	Peak position
Canada Country (Radio & Records)	1
US Hot Country Songs (Billboard)	2
US Billboard Hot 100	38
US Billboard Pop 100	64

=== Year-end charts ===
Chart (2005)	Position
US Country Songs (Billboard)	7

== Personnel ==
As listed in liner notes.

- Tom Bukovac – electric guitar
- Brandon Bush – organ
- Kristian Bush – mandolin, background vocals
- Chad Cromwell – drums
- Dan Dugmore – electric guitar, pedal steel guitar, lap steel guitar
- Kristen Hall – acoustic guitar, background vocals
- Greg Morrow – tambourine
- Jennifer Nettles – lead vocals, background vocals
- Glenn Worf – bass guitar
