= Want To =

Single by Sugarland

from the album Enjoy the Ride
- Released: August 21, 2006
- Genre: Country
- Length: 3:35
- Label: Mercury Nashville
- Songwriters: Bobby Pinson; Kristian Bush; Jennifer Nettles
- Producers: Byron Gallimore; Sugarland

Sugarland singles chronology
| "Down in Mississippi (Up to No Good)" (2006) | "Want To" (2006) | "Settlin'" (2007) |

"Want To" is a song co-written and recorded by American country music duo Sugarland. It was released in August 2006 as the first single from the album Enjoy the Ride. It was their first single not to feature former member Kristen Hall. Although Jennifer Nettles had previously been featured on Bon Jovi's Number One country hit, "Who Says You Can't Go Home", the song was the first regular Number One hit of Sugarland's career in the U.S., spending two weeks at the top of the Billboard Hot Country Songs charts in late 2006.

== Content ==
The duo's members, Jennifer Nettles and Kristian Bush, wrote the song along with Bobby Pinson. The song has a moderate tempo and is composed in the key of E-flat major.

In a review for Country Standard Time, Dan MacIntosh wrote that "Want To" "reprises the sort of detailed storytelling that makes country songs memorable...It's nothing fancy, but it paints an immediate, unmistakable picture." Taste of Country writer Billy Dukes said that the song is about "yearning for a lover while trying to play it cool."

== Critical reception ==
A review in the blog Country Universe was favorable, stating that it was a "Great song, as should be expected. Jennifer Nettles is quickly becoming one of country music’s most distinctive vocalists." Billy Dukes of Taste of Country ranked it number 95 on his 2012 list of "top 100 country love songs".

The song has sold 856,000 copies in the US as of April 2013.

== Chart performance ==
| Chart (2006–2007) | Peak position |
|---|---|
| Canada Country (Billboard) | 1 |
| US Hot Country Songs (Billboard) | 1 |
| US Billboard Hot 100 | 32 |
| US Billboard Pop 100 | 49 |

=== Year-end charts ===
| Chart (2006) | Position |
|---|---|
| US Country Songs (Billboard) | 45 |

| Chart (2007) | Position |
|---|---|
| US Country Songs (Billboard) | 48 |

== Personnel ==
- Tom Bukovac – electric guitar
- Brandon Bush – organ
- Kristian Bush – acoustic guitar, mandolin, background vocals
- Dan Dugmore – Dobro
- Kenny Greenberg – electric guitar
- Tony Harrell – Mellotron, organ
- Greg Morrow – drums, percussion
- Jennifer Nettles – acoustic guitar, lead vocals, background vocals
- Glenn Worf – bass guitar
