= Kristen Hall =

American singer-songwriter

- Born: October 24, 1962 (age 63)
- Origin: Atlanta, Georgia, U.S.
- Genres: Folk rock, country
- Occupation: Singer-songwriter
- Instruments: Vocals, acoustic guitar
- Years active: 1990–present
- Label: Mercury Nashville (with Sugarland)
- Formerly of: Sugarland

Kristen Hall (born October 24, 1962) is an American folk rock singer-songwriter and a founding member of the country music group Sugarland. She had a solo career and released several albums, formed the country band Sugarland, and more recently has been involved in songwriting collaborations with Courtney Jaye.

== Association with Sugarland ==
Hall formed Sugarland in 2002 with Jennifer Nettles and Kristian Bush, and was co-writer of many of the group's early hits. Hall left the group in December 2005 after the band's debut album Twice the Speed of Life. Nettles and Bush released a statement that "Kristen has decided that she wants to stay home and write songs, and we support her in that decision." It has been speculated, however, that Hall was pressured into departing the group for image reasons, or that she was paid to leave.

In July 2008, Hall filed a lawsuit for $14 million against Nettles and Bush in the U.S. District Court in Atlanta. She claimed "I started the band, I named the band," and that she bankrolled much of the group's debut album on her credit cards. The remaining band members countered that it was $100,000 in debt at her exit. The case was settled in November 2010. Specifics of the case have never been released publicly.

== Personal life ==
Hall is a lesbian.

== Discography ==
=== Solo career ===
- Real Life Stuff (1990)
- Kristen Hall Band Bootleg (1991)
- Fact & Fiction (1992)
- Vocals on Doubting Thomas "Blue Angel" (1993)
- Be Careful What You Wish For (1994)
- Vocals on Doubting Thomas "Two" (1995)
- Thumbprint (1996)
- California Made Music (1999)
- Live at Eddie's Attic (2000)
- Kristen Hall August 2000 Demos (2001)
- Katy The Wonder Cub (2008)

=== Sugarland ===
- Twice the Speed of Life (2004)
