= Kristian Bush discography =

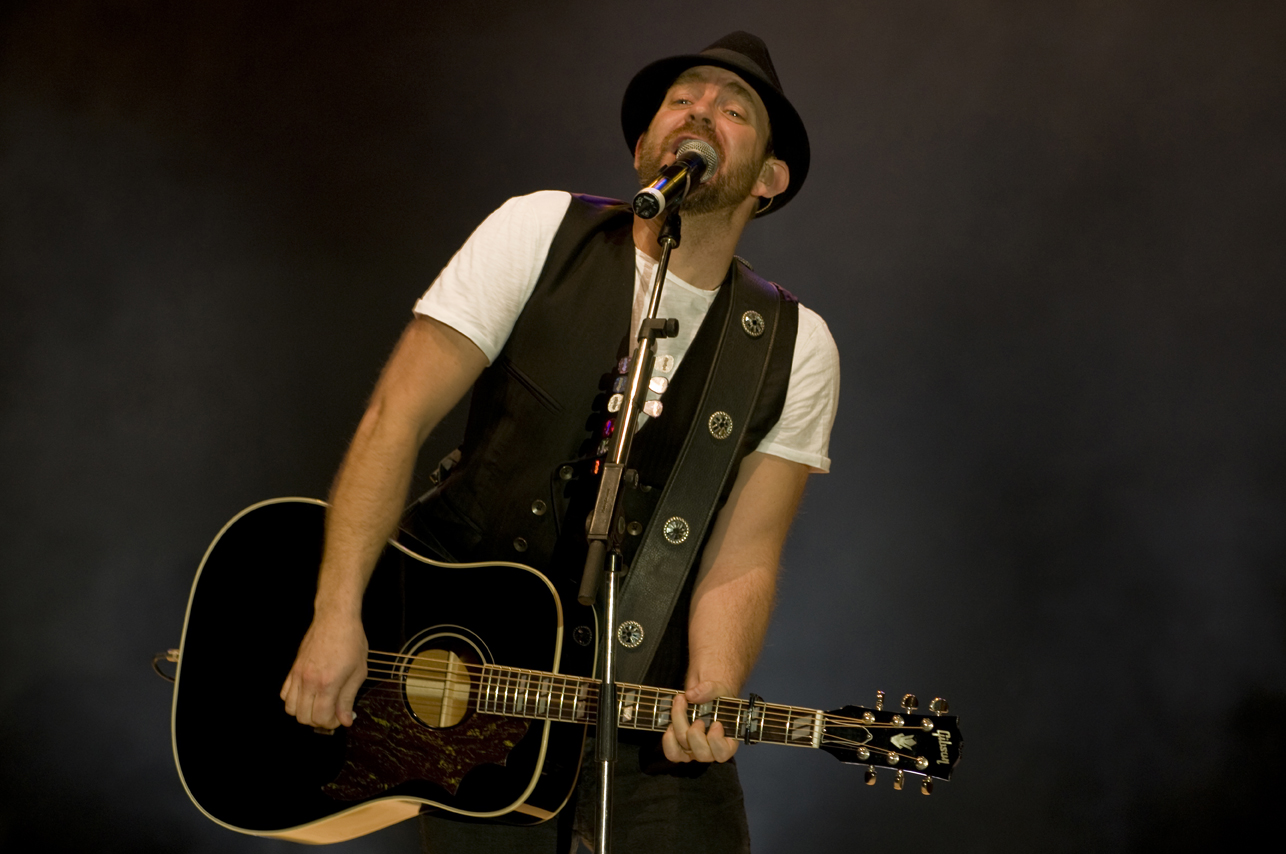
- Kristian Bush at Ramstein Air Base, Germany (2009)
- Studio albums: 11

The discography of Kristian Bush, an American singer, songwriter, producer, and multi-instrumentalist, consists of five Billy Pilgrim studio albums, six Sugarland studio albums, several solo releases, and a wide range of appearances, productions, songwriting cuts and charting singles.

While Bush is best known for being one-half of the international super-duo Sugarland, he has been leaving his mark on music for more than two decades.

== Albums ==
=== Billy Pilgrim albums ===
- St. Christopher's Crossing (March 26, 1992 Sister Ruby)
- Words Like Numbers (March 18, 1993 Sister Ruby)
- Billy Pilgrim (October 6, 1994 Atlantic Recording Corporation)
- Bloom (October 19, 1995 Atlantic Recording Corporation)
- In the Time Machine (April 12, 2001 Honest Harry)

=== Sugarland albums ===
- Premium Quality Tunes (2003)
- Sugar in the Raw (2003)
- Twice the Speed of Life (2004)
- Enjoy the Ride (2006)
- Love on the Inside (2008)
- Live on the Inside (2009)
- Gold and Green (2009)
- The Incredible Machine (2010)
- Bigger (2018)

=== Solo albums and releases ===
- Paint It All (March 19, 2002, self-released)
- "Love or Money" (March 28, 2013 Songs of the Architect)
- "Trailer Hitch" (July 28, 2014 Streamsound Records under license from Architect Music Collective, LLC)
- Southern Gravity (2015) Streamsound Records.
- Troubadour (2021)
- 52 | ATL x BNA (2022)
- 52 | In the Key of Summer (2022)
- 52 | New Blue (2022)
- 52 | This Year (2023)
- Drink Happy Thoughts (2023)

== Songwriting ==
=== Charting singles ===
- 1994 "Insomniac" - Billy Pilgrim (Billy Pilgrim) +
- 1995 "I Won't Tell" - Billy Pilgrim (Bloom) *
- 2004 "Baby Girl" - Sugarland (Twice the Speed of Life) +
- 2005 "Something More" - Sugarland (Twice the Speed of Life) +
- 2005 "Stand Back Up" - Sugarland (Twice the Speed of Life)
- 2006 "Down in Mississippi (Up to No Good)" - Sugarland (Twice the Speed of Life)
- 2006 "Want To" - Sugarland (Enjoy the Ride) *
- 2007 "Settlin'" - Sugarland (Enjoy the Ride) *
- 2007 "Everyday America" - Sugarland (Enjoy the Ride) +
- 2008 "All I Want to Do" - Sugarland (Love on the Inside) *
- 2008 "Already Gone" - Sugarland (Love on the Inside) *
- 2009 "It Happens" - Sugarland (Love on the Inside) *
- 2009 "Joey" - Sugarland (Love on the Inside)
- 2010 "Gold and Green" - Sugarland (Gold and Green)
- 2010 "Stuck Like Glue" - Sugarland (The Incredible Machine) +
- 2010 "Little Miss" - Sugarland (The Incredible Machine)
- 2011 "Tonight" - Sugarland (The Incredible Machine)

(*) denotes Billboard No. 1 (+) denotes Billboard Top 10

=== Outside cuts ===
- 1999 "All of My Heroes" - The Blue Dogs (For The Record)
- 2002 "All of My Heroes" - The Blue Dogs (Live at the Florence Little Theater)
- 2006 "Wandering Moon" - Kristen Markinton (Wandering Moon)
- 2006 "Blowing You Down" - Kristen Markinton (Wandering Moon)
- 2006 "Come Back to Bed" - Kristen Markinton (Wandering Moon)
- 2009 "Once Upon a Summertime" - Ellis Paul (A Summer Night in Georgia)
- 2010 "Paper Dolls" - Ellis Paul (The Day After Everything Changed)
- 2010 "The Day After Everything Changed" - Ellis Paul (The Day After Everything Changed)
- 2010 "River Road" - Ellis Paul (The Day After Everything Changed)
- 2010 "Lights of Vegas" - Ellis Paul (The Day After Everything Changed)
- 2011 "Run" - Matt Nathanson (Modern Love)
- 2012 "Burn" - James Patrick Morgan (James Patrick Morgan)
- 2012 "She Won't Drive in the Rain Anymore" - The dB's (Falling Off the Sky)
- 2012 "Stuck in the Middle" - Boys Like Girls (Crazy World)
- 2013 "Boy Who Cried Love" - Jaida Dreyer (I Am Jaida Dreyer)

== Production credits ==
- 1985 Shades of Black - Flip
- 1986 Pleasures Denied - Masada
- 1987 Heroes - Flip
- 1989 Saturday - Flip
- 1990 Politics and Pocketchange - Kristian Bush
- 1990 Big Backporch Songs - The Hyras
- 1992 St. Christopher's Crossing - Billy Pilgrim
- 1992 Christmas Present 1992 - Various Artists (Billy Pilgrim, "Let It Snow")
- 1992 What's Up In the Attic? - Various Artists
- 1993 Words Like Numbers - Billy Pilgrim
- 1993 Durable Phig Leaf - Evan and Jaron
- 1993 Naked Rhythm - Various Artists (Kristian Bush, "Insomniac")
- 1994 Billy Pilgrim - Billy Pilgrim
- 1994 True Story - Various Artists (Billy Pilgrim, "Last American Poet")
- 1994 A Tribute to Bob Dylan Vol 2 - Various Artists (Kristian Bush, "Mama, You Been on My Mind")
- 1995 Bloom - Billy Pilgrim
- 1995 You Sleigh Me: Alternative Christmas Hits - Various Artists (Billy Pilgrim, "The First Noel")
- 1996 Letters in the Dirt - Chuck Brodsky
- 1996 Not from Concentrate - Evan and Jaron
- 1996 Heartsongs - Various Artists (Kristian Bush, "RFD")
- 1996 Skin and Water - Nance Pettit
- 1998 New Blood - Beth Wood
- 1998 Radio - Chuck Brodsky
- 1999 Snow Globe - Billy Pilgrim
- 2000 BeSides - Billy Pilgrim
- 2000 Nine Twenty Three - Billy Pilgrim
- 2000 Last of the Old Time - Chuck Brodsky
- 2001 In the Time Machine - Billy Pilgrim
- 2001 Shallow Hal Motion Picture Soundtrack - Various Artists (Ellis Paul, "Sweet Mistakes")
- 2001 Sweet Mistakes - Ellis Paul
- 2002 Baseball Ballads - Chuck Brodsky
- 2002 Paint It All - Kristian Bush
- 2003 Radio Motion Picture Soundtrack - Various Artists (Chuck Brodsky, "Radio")
- 2003 Premium Quality Tunes - Sugarland
- 2003 Sugar in the Raw - Sugarland
- 2004 Twice the Speed of Life - Sugarland
- 2006 Essentials - Ellis Paul
- 2006 Wandering Moon - Kristian Markinton
- 2006 Enjoy the Ride - Sugarland
- 2007 A Place to Land - Little Big Town ("Life in a Northern Town")
- 2008 Red House 25: A Silver Anniversary Retrospective - Various Artists (Chuck Brodsky, "The Ballad of Eddie Klepp")
- 2008 Love on the Inside - Sugarland
- 2009 Live on the Inside - Sugarland
- 2009 Gold and Green - Sugarland
- 2010 The Incredible Machine - Sugarland
- 2010 2010 Grammy Nominees - Various Artists (Sugarland, "It Happens")
- 2011 Modern Love - Matt Nathanson ("Run")
- 2012 I Am Jaida Dreyer - Jaida Dreyer ("Boy Who Cried Love")
- 2012 Act of Valor: The Album [Original Soundtrack] - Various Artists (Sugarland, "Guide You Home")
