= Tonight (Sugarland song) =

Single by Sugarland

from the album The Incredible Machine
- Released: April 11, 2011
- Genre: Country
- Length: 4:33
- Label: Mercury Nashville
- Songwriters: Jennifer Nettles; Kristian Bush; Kevin Griffin
- Producers: Kristian Bush; Jennifer Nettles; Byron Gallimore

Sugarland singles chronology
"Little Miss" (2010)	"Tonight" (2011)	"Run" (2011)

"Tonight" is a song co-written and recorded by American country music duo Sugarland. It was released in April 2011 as the third single from their album The Incredible Machine. The song was written by Jennifer Nettles, Kristian Bush and Kevin Griffin.

== Critical reception ==
Blake Boldt of Engine 145 gave the song a thumbs down, saying that it "is consistently dull in content" and that the single felt "unfocused, without an anchor," while calling Nettles' vocal performance "below-par."

== Music video ==
The video for "Tonight" was released on VEVO on April 22, 2011, and was directed by Marcus Raboy. The video starts with Nettles against a green background in a red dress sitting on a tan booth before switching to a second outfit where she is in black, at a photo shoot. The last scene shows her in a white outfit in a white bedroom, lounging on and in the bed. Also, Bush is seen playing guitar in a photo shop.

== Chart performance ==
"Tonight" debuted at number 54 on the U.S. Billboard Hot Country Songs chart for the week dated May 7, 2011. It peaked at number 32 in its seventh week, making it their lowest-peaking song of their career to date.

Chart (2011)	Peak position
Canada Country (Billboard)	49
US Hot Country Songs (Billboard)	32
