= Stuck Like Glue =

Single by Sugarland

from the album The Incredible Machine
- B-side: "What I'd Give" (Remix)
- Released: July 26, 2010
- Genre: Country; country pop; reggae fusion
- Length: 4:07 (Album/Single Version); 3:26 (Radio Edit)
- Label: Mercury Nashville
- Songwriters: Jennifer Nettles; Kristian Bush; Kevin Griffin; Shy Carter
- Producers: Kristian Bush; Jennifer Nettles; Byron Gallimore

Sugarland singles chronology
"Joey" (2009)	"Stuck Like Glue" (2010)	"Little Miss" (2010)

"Stuck Like Glue" is a song by American country music duo Sugarland. Written by Jennifer Nettles, Kristian Bush, Kevin Griffin and Shy Carter, it was released on July 26, 2010 as the first single from Sugarland's album The Incredible Machine, released October 19, 2010. "Stuck Like Glue" debuted at number 44 on the U.S. Billboard Hot Country Songs chart for the week of August 7, 2010, and debuted at #20 on the Billboard Hot 100 the following week. It went on to sell 2,629,000 digital copies by May 2013.

== Content ==
The song is in the key of D-flat major, using a main pattern of D♭5-A♭5-G♭sus2 on the verses. The narrator sings that she and her lover are "stuck like glue".

Some stations have edited out the song's reggae bridge and/or a portion near the end in which Nettles' backing vocals are Auto-Tuned.

== Critical reception ==
Blake Boldt of Engine 145 gave the song a thumbs-up. His review called the song "oddball" and "interesting," praising Jennifer Nettles's vocal stylings as well as the production.

Kevin John Coyne of Country Universe gave the song an "A" rating, and said "I could write a few paragraphs about why I love this song, but what’s the point...All I have to say about “Stuck Like Glue” is this: Listening to it makes me very happy."

== Music video ==
The music video was released on August 6, 2010 on VEVO, directed by Declan Whitebloom. The video portrays an alternative interpretation of the lyrics. The video opens with the narrator, driving up to the house of her ex-lover (played by Ryan McPartlin), whom she obviously stalks. Her ex-lover ends up calling the police, and she gets arrested, and appears in a mugshot room with other criminals. After being released, she goes to the house of the ex-lover, and kidnaps him by putting a sack over his head and driving him to a warehouse with many pictures & paintings of him there. She drugs him, and proceeds to feed him a cake with his face on it. At the end, she takes his phone and sees an incoming call from "Kim" (actress Brooke Hutton), who is shown to be an attractive young woman on picture caller ID, and the video ends as she punches him for it. As of January 2023, the music video has received more than 56 million views on YouTube.

== Live performances ==
Sugarland promoted the song multiple times, being a regular part of the setlist of their The Incredible Machine tour. The song was also performed live in American Idol and at the Nobel Peace Prize in Oslo, Norway. After their five-years hiatus, the duo keeps singing the song at the 2018 version of the C2C: Country to Country festival and the Dick Clark's New Year's Rockin' Eve.

== Chart performance ==
"Stuck Like Glue" debuted at No. 44 on the U.S. Billboard Hot Country Songs chart for the week of August 7, 2010. One week later, it debuted on the Billboard Hot 100 at No. 20. It also debuted at No. 53 on the Canadian Hot 100 chart for the week of August 14, 2010. It became the 11th most downloaded country music song of all time by April 2011, and it was the best-selling song by a country duo until it was surpassed by Florida Georgia Line's "Cruise" in April 2013. To date, this is Sugarland's final Top 10 hit.

The single entered the UK Top 100 at number 74 on February 13, 2011. It debuted at No. 30 on the U.S. Billboard Adult Contemporary chart for the week of March 26, 2011.

== Track listing ==
US Walmart Exclusive CD single
No.	Title	Writer(s)	Length
1.	"Stuck Like Glue"	Jennifer Nettles; Kristian Bush; Kevin Griffin; Shy Carter	4:07
2.	"What I'd Give" (Remix)	Nettles; Bush; Clayton Mitchell	4:37

== Charts and certifications ==
=== Weekly charts ===
Chart (2010–2011)	Peak position
Canada Hot 100 (Billboard)	29
Canada Country (Billboard)	3
Scotland Singles (OCC)	66
UK Singles (OCC)	74
US Billboard Hot 100	17
US Adult Contemporary (Billboard)	27
US Adult Pop Airplay (Billboard)	22
US Hot Country Songs (Billboard)	2

=== Certifications ===
Region	Certification	Certified units/sales
United States (RIAA)	2× Platinum	2,629,000

=== Year-end charts ===
Chart (2010)	Position
US Billboard Hot 100	81
US Country Songs (Billboard)	30

== Release history ==
Date	Region
July 26, 2010	United States
January 31, 2011	United Kingdom
June 25, 2011	Netherlands
