= Little Miss (Sugarland song) =

2010 song by Sugarland

Single by Sugarland

from the album The Incredible Machine
- Released: November 15, 2010
- Genre: Country
- Length: 4:31
- Label: Mercury Nashville
- Songwriters: Jennifer Nettles; Kristian Bush
- Producers: Kristian Bush; Jennifer Nettles; Byron Gallimore

Sugarland singles chronology
"Stuck Like Glue" (2010)	"Little Miss" (2010)	"Tonight" (2011)

"Little Miss" is a song written and recorded by the American country music duo Sugarland. It was released in November 2010 as the second single from the album The Incredible Machine. Before the album's release, the song charted on the Billboard Hot 100 at number 80, due to digital downloads. It has also reached the Top 20 of the Billboard Hot Country Songs chart. The song was featured in the pilot of The CW TV series Hart of Dixie.

== Critical reception ==
Blake Boldt of Engine 145 gave the song a thumbs up, saying "There’s hope and heart and a whole lot to like about this, one of the year’s best singles and an odd bright spot on Sugarland’s ambitious fourth album. The Incredible Machine may be an unruly mess, but "Little Miss" is a hit." Mark Erickson of Roughstock was also favorable of the song, giving the song four stars, saying "The melody is inviting and the lyrics are some of the duo’s best of the album". Although he was in very critical of the album altogether, Jonathan Keefe with Slant Magazine was high praise of the song, calling the "album's best song; [it's] the only one that even hints at Sugarland's roots as a country act [...] it's also the most restrained cut on the album in terms of both its production and performance makes it an obvious standout, but it's a strong enough song that it can stand on its own merits." Sarah Rodman with The Boston Globe called it an "amiable shuffle", saying it "fit squarely in the country pop arena."

== "The Little Miss Project" ==
A Sugarland fan named Erica J. Bjork made a fan made video for the song with the help of other Sugarland fans. The video is about Sugarland fans holding up signs of hard times in their lives and telling their stories, when the song eventually show that the fans learn that it will be ok, thanks to the song. The video inspired Sugarland to offer the ability for all people to share their experience with how the song has helped them. During the concert performance of the song, fans in the first few rows do a 'live' version of the project.

== Chart performance ==
"Little Miss" first entered the Billboard Hot 100 at number 80 when it was released as a promotional single and it stayed in that position for a week before falling from the charts. Upon being released as a single, the song has become a Top 20 single on the Hot Country Songs chart. It peaked at #11 in April 2011.

Chart (2010–2011)	Peak position
Canada Country (Billboard)	13
US Hot Country Songs (Billboard)	11
US Billboard Hot 100	71

=== Year-end charts ===
Chart (2011)	Position
US Country Songs (Billboard)	55
