= Austin Webb =

American country music singer-songwriter

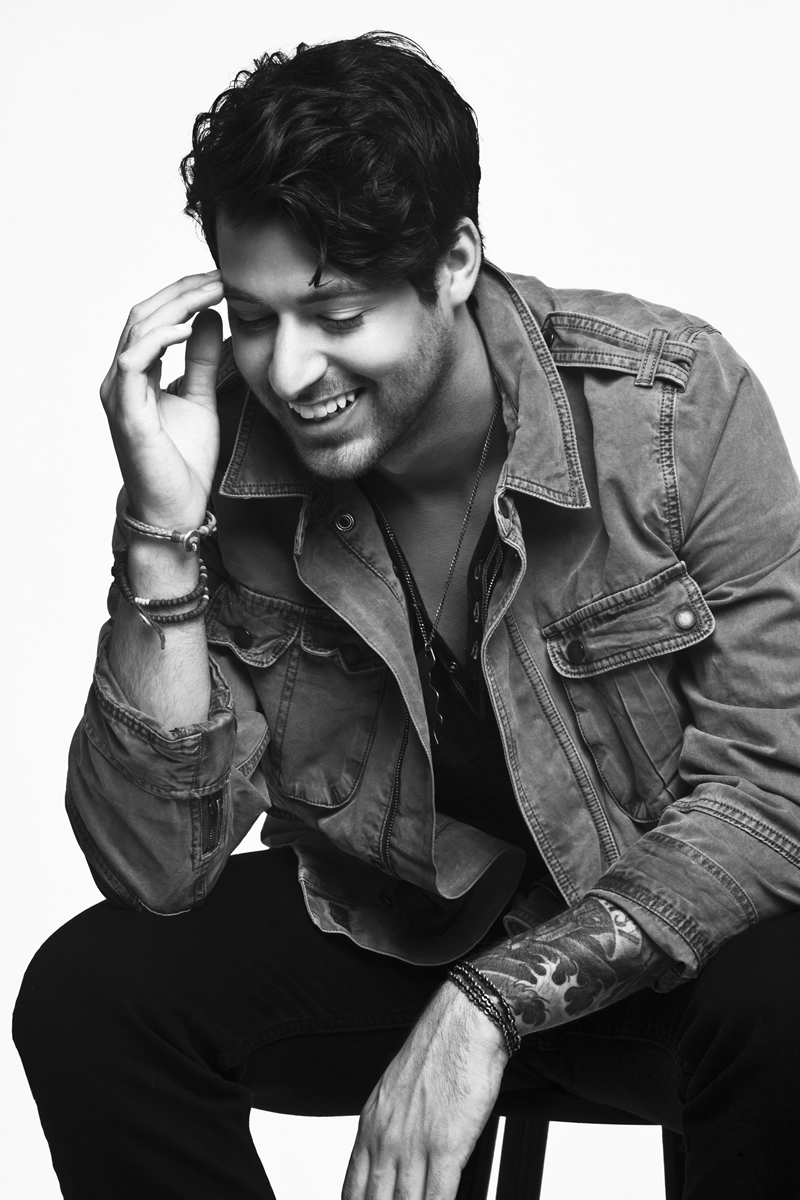
- Austin Webb's press photo

Background information
- Born: Williamston, South Carolina
- Genres: Country
- Occupation: Singer-songwriter
- Instruments: Vocals, guitar harmonica
- Years active: 2007–present
- Label: Streamsound
- Website: www.austinwebb.com

Austin Webb (born in Williamston, South Carolina) is an American country music singer-songwriter. Webb moved to Nashville, Tennessee in 2011 after winning a songwriting competition in Greenville.

In 2012, Webb signed with Streamsound Records, a label founded by Byron Gallimore and Jim Wilkes. He released his debut single, "It's All Good", in December 2012. The song debuted at number 53 on the Billboard Country Airplay chart in February 2013. It will be included on an album produced by Gallimore. Webb released his second single, "Slip On By", in July 2013 and it peaked on the Billboard Country Airplay chart at number 40 in early 2014. Webb made his debut on the Grand Ole Opry on November 9, 2013.

In December 2013, Webb made his debut national anthem performance at the Green Bay Packers Lambeau Field.

Early in 2014 Webb was selected to appear on the first leg of "The Country Deep Tour" presented by AT&T U-Verse and featuring Jana Kramer and Canaan Smith.

In early March 2014, Webb's third single "Raise 'Em Up" was released and debuted at number 58 on the Billboard Country Airplay chart.

In January 2015, Webbs fourth single "All Country On You" was released. The song peaked at number 38 on Billboard Country Airplay Chart.

== Discography ==
=== Albums ===
| Title | Album details |
|---|---|
| Written Photography | Release date: October 23, 2007; Label: Grassroots Resurgence |
| Holy Smoke | Release date: April 27, 2010; Label: CD Baby |

=== Singles ===
| Year | Single | Peak chart positions | |
| Year | Single | US Country | US Country Airplay |
|---|---|---|---|
| 2012 | "It's All Good" | — | 53 |
| 2013 | "Slip On By" | — | 40 |
| 2014 | "Raise 'Em Up" | — | 52 |
| 2015 | "All Country on You" | 42 | 38 |
"—" denotes releases that did not chart

=== Guest singles ===
| Year | Single | Artist |
|---|---|---|
| 2016 | "Just Got Paid" | Dee Jay Silver |

=== Music videos ===
| Year | Video | Director |
|---|---|---|
| 2013 | "It's All Good" | Carl Diebold |
| 2013 | "Slip On By" | Stephen Shepherd |
