= Dakota Bradley =

American pop rock singer and songwriter

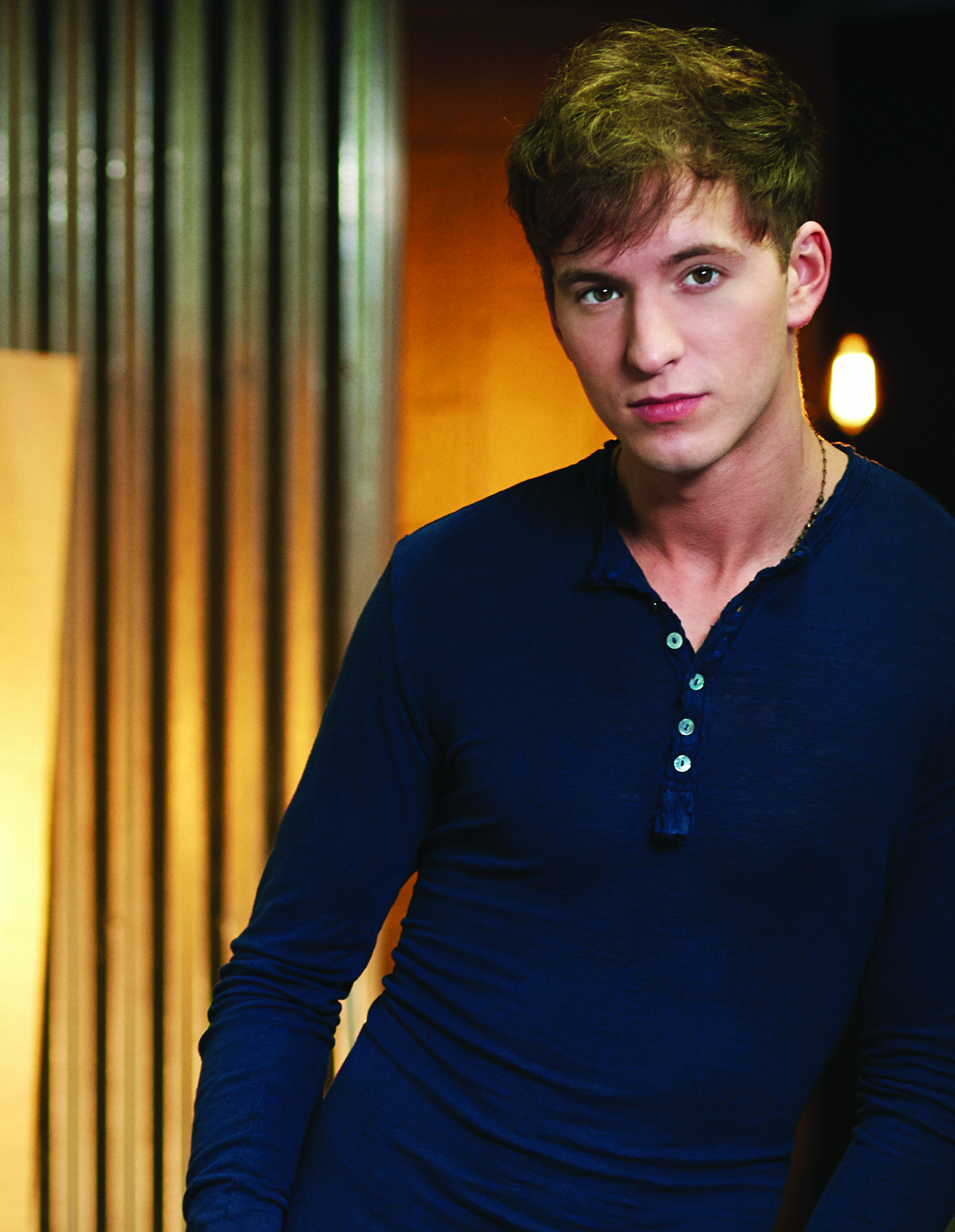

Background information
- Birth name: Lenny Pey
- Born: St. Louis, Missouri, U.S.
- Genres: Country
- Occupation: Singer-songwriter
- Instrument(s): Vocals, guitar
- Years active: 2009–present
- Labels: Streamsound

Dakota Bradley (born in St. Louis, Missouri) is the stage name of American pop rock singer and songwriter, Lenny Pey.

== Career ==
After a fire destroyed his home in 2009, Bradley moved to Nashville, Tennessee to pursue a career in music. He gained internet fame when he and CJ Holland posted a YouTube video of themselves covering Paul McCartney and Michael Jackson's "The Girl Is Mine", which went viral and led to an appearance on The Ellen DeGeneres Show in 2010. In 2011, Bradley wrote "All of My Tomorrows" with Colt Ford, which was released on Ford's 2012 Declaration of Independence album. The song topped the charts and Dakota received a Billboard Number One Award.

In 2012, Bradley signed with Streamsound Records, a label founded by Byron Gallimore and Jim Wilkes. Bradley's debut album was produced by Byron Gallimore and Tim McGraw. Bradley's debut single, "Somethin' Like Somethin'", was released on May 14, 2013 and reached number 53 on the Billboard Country Airplay chart. In August 2013, Bradley opened for McGraw in Phoenix, Arizona during the Two Lanes of Freedom Tour. Later that month he released an exclusive track, "Memory or Me", to Glamour.com. He also released a special track, "Wild Child", on SiriusXM The Highway in November 2013. Shortly after, Streamsound Records closed and Bradley became an independent artist.

Bradley's second single, which he co-wrote, was called "Won't Be Young Forever" and was released in April 2014.

== Singles ==
Year	Single	Peak positions
Year	Single	US Country Airplay
2013	"Somethin' Like Somethin'"	53
2014	"Won't Be Young Forever"	—
"—" denotes releases that did not chart
