= Southern Gravity =

Studio album by Kristian Bush
- Released: April 7, 2015
- Genre: Country
- Length: 44:30
- Label: Streamsound
- Producer: Kristian Bush; Tom Tapley

Singles from Southern Gravity
- 1. "Trailer Hitch" Released: July 28, 2014; 2. "Light Me Up" Released: June 1, 2015

Southern Gravity is the debut solo studio album by American country music singer Kristian Bush, one half of the duo Sugarland. It was released on April 7, 2015 via Streamsound Records

== Content ==
Bush revealed the track list and title of the album on January 28, 2015. In an interview with Rolling Stone, he said, "I want people to go, 'I had no idea!' Using my voice is something I've shied away from, and I can't believe what a tool it is." Jon Freeman of Country Weekly described the album's content as "a remarkably positive album…with only 'House on the Beach' alluding to an air of exhaustion and 'Feeling Fine California' occurring in the bewildering in the aftermath of a breakup. In large part, the songs are as sunny and personable as the man who wrote and recorded them." Marrissa Moss of Rolling Stone noted influences of Steve Earle, Zac Brown Band, and Jason Mraz in Bush's work for the album.

The album's first single is "Trailer Hitch". Bush co-wrote all 12 songs, and co-produced the album with Tom Tapley; Byron Gallimore is the album's executive producer.

== Critical reception ==
Sarah Rodman of The Boston Globe reviewed the album favorably, saying that Bush "offer[s] up a collection of catchy radio-ready tunes that don’t go too heavy on the gloss and play up his rootsy leanings" and "Bush takes center stage behind the microphone for the first time and shows off his pleasantly gritty vocals as he waxes mostly chipper about life, love, and what it all means." Giving it a B+, Bob Paxman of Country Weekly wrote that "overall, you’ll be drawn to the good and positive vibes, delivered with Kristian’s laid-back but soulful style, unbelievably catchy melodies and warm sentiments. "

== Track listing ==
No.	Title	Writer(s)	Length
1.	"Make Another Memory"	Kristian Bush, Jeff Cohen, Rodney Clawson	3:11
2.	"Light Me Up"	K. Bush, Jesse Rice	3:33
3.	"Trailer Hitch"	K. Bush, Brandon Bush, Tim Owens	2:50
4.	"Southern Gravity"	K. Bush, Scooter Carusoe	4:12
5.	"Flip Flops"	K. Bush, Cohen, Paul Overstreet	3:42
6.	"Giving It Up"	K. Bush, Cohen, Tom Douglas	3:51
7.	"Feeling Fine California"	K. Bush, Cohen, Overstreet	4:24
8.	"Waiting on an Angel"	K. Bush, Cohen, Bob DiPiero	3:15
9.	"Walk Tall"	K. Bush, Cohen, Nathaniel "Bo" Rinehart, William "Bear" Rinehart	3:58
10.	"Sending You a Sunset"	K. Bush, Tim Owens	3:57
11.	"Sweet Love"	K. Bush, Cohen, Phil Barton, Sherrié Austin	3:44
12.	"House on a Beach"	K. Bush, Canaan Smith	3:48

== Chart performance ==
The album debuted on the Billboard 200 at 160 and the Top Country Albums chart at No. 16, selling 3,700 copies for the week in the US.

=== Album ===
Chart (2015)	Peak position
Australian Albums (ARIA)	31
Australia Country Albums (ARIA)	6
UK Country Albums (OCC)	6
US Billboard 200	160
US Top Country Albums (Billboard)	16
US Heatseekers Albums (Billboard)	5
US Independent Albums (Billboard)	17

=== Singles ===
Year	Single	Peak chart positions			
Year	Single	US Country	US Country Airplay	US Bubbling	CAN Country
2014	"Trailer Hitch"	25	21	9	44
2015	"Light Me Up"	—	60	—	—
