= Chyra =

Chyra or Hyra is a Polish surname. Notable people with the surnames include:

== Chyra ==
- Chyra, character from the 1929 film One Stolen Night
- Andrzej Chyra (born 1964), Polish actor
- Gran Chyra, character from the TV show Utopia Falls
- Robert Chyra (born 1974), Polish Paralympic athlete
- Zofia Chyra-Rolicz (born 1948), Polish historian

== Hyra ==
- Andrew Hyra, American musician, half of the duo Billy Pilgrim, brother of actress Meg Ryan
- Brad Hyra, American musician of Trapped Under Ice
- Cliff Hyra (born 1982), American patent attorney and politician
- Edward Hyra, Polish general
- Meg Ryan (born Margaret Hyra; 1961), American actress and producer of Polish descent
