= Trailer Hitch =

Single by Kristian Bush

from the album Southern Gravity
- Released: July 28, 2014
- Genre: Country
- Length: 2:50
- Label: Streamsound
- Songwriter(s): Kristian Bush; Brandon Bush; Tim Owens
- Producer(s): Kristian Bush; Tom Tapley

Kristian Bush singles chronology
"Trailer Hitch" (2014)	"Light Me Up" (2015)

"Trailer Hitch" is a song co-written and recorded by American country music artist Kristian Bush, one half of the duo Sugarland. It was released on July 28, 2014, as Bush's first solo single and the lead single from his debut solo album, Southern Gravity. Bush co-wrote the song with his brother, Brandon Bush, and Tim Owens.

== Critical reception ==
Billy Dukes of Taste of Country gave the song a favorable review, writing that Bush's "first crack at solo success is no less of a ray of sunshine than any of [Sugarland]’s most contagious cuts," though "he separates himself as an artist." Dukes added that "the song’s message is easy to embrace" and "Bush’s voice sounds good on country radio." Kevin John Coyne of Country Universe gave the song a B+ grade, writing that "it’s a light, breezy song with great charm, and he sings it with the appropriate combination of conviction and good spirit." He also stated that "Kristian Bush’s first solo single has more personality, more substance, and is more thoroughly entertaining in the way we expect Sugarland to be than what we’ve heard so far from Jennifer Nettles." USA Today named the song their "song of the week" on July 29, 2014, with Brian Mansfield calling it "the antithesis of the conspicuous consumption that seems so much a part of contemporary country music" and "Jason Mraz with a little steel guitar."

== Music video ==
The music video was directed by Blake Judd and premiered in October 2014. In the video, Bush performs the song in a bar full of zombies.

== Chart performance ==
"Trailer Hitch" debuted at number 60 on the U.S. Billboard Country Airplay chart for the week of July 12, 2014. It also debuted at number 46 on the U.S. Billboard Hot Country Songs chart for the week of November 8, 2014.

Chart (2014–2015)	Peak position
Canada Country (Billboard)	44
US Bubbling Under Hot 100 Singles (Billboard)	9
US Country Airplay (Billboard)	21
US Hot Country Songs (Billboard)	25

=== Year-end charts ===
Chart (2015)	Position
US Country Airplay (Billboard)	90
US Hot Country Songs (Billboard)	94
