= 52 (album series) =

Series of albums by Kristian Bush

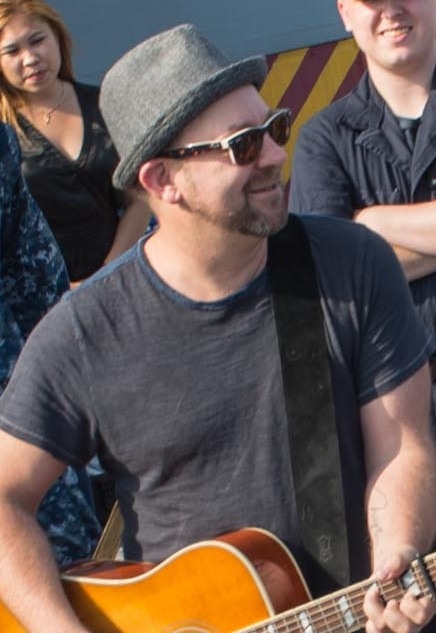
Kristian Bush in 2015

52 is a series of albums by American country singer, songwriter, and record producer Kristian Bush. The series consists of four albums with 52 songs total that were written by Bush over the past two decades in the music industry. The albums released over the course of a year—from 2022 to 2023—to celebrate Bush's 52nd birthday. The project began with the release first two songs of the collection, "Everybody Gotta Go Home" and "Tennessee Plates", on March 4, 2022, and concluded with the release of the final album, 52 | This Year on March 10, 2023.

Encouraged by his work releasing archived and unreleased music from the 1990s to 2010s, and inspired by a four-record box set of original music released by country artist Vince Gill, Bush decided to release a collection of 52 songs in the span of one year. The music was unreleased music written by Bush from across his music career, with works spanning as early as 2006. The music co-written with many other songwriters and recorded in Decatur, Georgia. Bush anticipated releasing the albums independently, but CEO of Big Machine Records Scott Borchetta supported the project. Bush was assisted on the whole project by his brother Brandon, and Bush also recorded a weekly podcast with music journalist Cindy Watts spanning 52 weeks.

The first album, 52 | ATL x BNA, released on March 25, 2022, and consists of music that blends country music from Nashville, Tennessee and R&B from Atlanta, Georgia. The second album, 52 | In the Key of Summer, released on June 24, 2022, and is a collection of music that reflects the feelings associated with the summer season. 52 | New Blue, the third album, released on September 30, 2022, and consists of music featuring a blend of genres, mainly alternative folk rock similar to the duo band Billy Pilgrim that Bush is a part of. The fourth and final album, 52 | This Year, released on March 10, 2023, and consisted of themes about true love and a reflection of Bush's career in the music industry.

== Overview ==
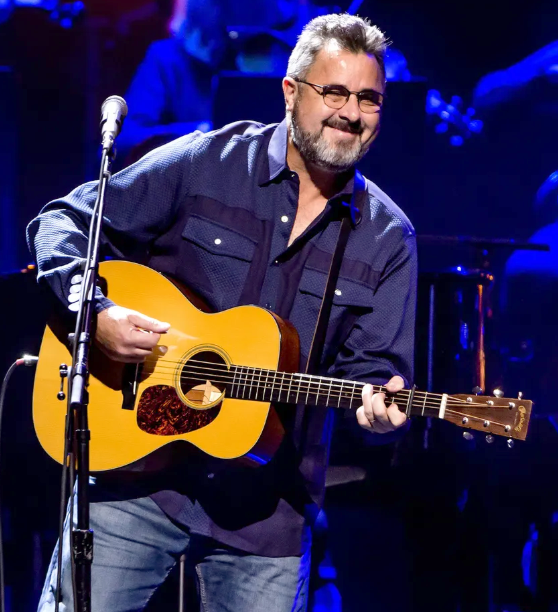
A four-record album set from Vince Gill was the inspiration and motivation for the 52 series.

In the 1990s, country musician Kristian Bush released four albums with Andrew Hyra as the alternative folk rock band Billy Pilgrim. Bush recovered an unreleased album of music in 2020, which he had remastered and released that year. During the government mandated lockdowns in response to the COVID-19 pandemic, Bush continued to release undocumented and scrapped music from the 1990s up to his time in the band Sugarland. He created a YouTube channel to broadcast these songs on a 24/7 station. The experience inspired him to return to various song ideas from then to as early as 2006, which "was simply sitting in hard drives on [his] desk." Upon returning to his music career when COVID-19 restrictions subsided in 2022, Bush was encouraged to "reimagine setbacks as opportunities" and release 52 songs in one year in celebration of his 52nd birthday. Bush was inspired and motivated to do the project from country artist Vince Gill. Gill once released a four-record set consisting of forty songs, all of which were new; Bush thought the idea of releasing a large quantity of songs was exciting, especially for the audience.

The 52 songs were selected from a collection of over 100 unreleased songs. Bush's brother Brandon helped advise the project and helped organize the songs into a coherent collection. The albums were all recorded in Bush's studio The Projector Room in Decatur, Georgia. Not finding a label for the project, Bush planned to release the series on his own. He contacted Scott Borchetta, the CEO of Sugarland's label Big Machine Records, and explained the project to keep him updated with his plans. To Bush's surprise, Borchetta was intrigued and supported the project. Borchetta suggested that the songs be released in four separate albums, so Bush did so, organizing the 52 songs into four groups. Bush also recorded a weekly podcast with music journalist Cindy Watts, 52-The Podcast, where he talked about the similarities between songs from the project and songs he worked on in the past. The podcast released once a week for 52 weeks.

== Albums ==
=== 52 | ATL x BNA ===
52 | ATL x BNA

Studio album by Kristian Bush
- Released: March 25, 2022
- Genre: Country, R&B
- Length: 33:21
- Label: Big Machine

Singles from ATL x BNA
- 1. "Everybody Gotta Go Home" Released: March 4, 2022; 2. "Tennessee Plates" Released: March 4, 2022

ATL x BNA is derived from music conceived from Bush's time in Nashville, Tennessee and Atlanta, Georgia. The album title is a cross of the IATA airport codes for the Hartsfield–Jackson Atlanta International Airport and the Nashville International Airport. A frequent traveler of both locations, Bush made the album to showcase his connections to the cities. 9 of the 10 songs on the album were co-written with Nashville songwriters, including Brett James, Bob DiPiero, Liz Rose, Jeffrey East, JT Harding, and Bobby Pinson. The recording sessions were done with R&B musicians from Atlanta, including Jorel "J-Fly" Flynn, Jerry Freeman, The Black Bettys, and Lionel Richie. The blend of country and R&B music was inspired from a live performance he did with his brother Brandon and Flynn in Atlanta, which he had fond memories of and wanted to recapture the energy with a mix of country music. Bush emphasized the use of pedal steel, horns, and drums. Borchetta described the album as following a line, the beginning of it featuring little R&B and the end entirely R&B, growing over the course of the album.

"Tennessee Plates" was written in 2016 following the death of his father. He sung the lyrics to the song on a voice memo while waiting at a stoplight on his way to the funeral. For a long time the two had a strained relationship as his father never believed his music career would be successful, and showed disinterest in him and his family when it did. Their relationship was reconciled when his father apologized for the way he treated Bush, which he reflected in the lyrics of the song; it's a reflective piece where Bush expresses gratitude for the ups and down of his career. According to Bush, "if he could say 'I'm sorry,' even in his last few days, then nothing is impossible." The day after the funeral he presented the voice memo to Rodney Clawson and Andrew DeRoberts, expanding on the original idea. Similar in meaning is "Everybody Gotta Go Home", which Bush also wrote in 2016 following the death of musician David Bowie. Bowie's album Blackstar, which released two days prior to his death, encouraged Bush to feel comfortable discussing death in music. The two songs released on March 4, 2022, and the entire album released on March 25.

==== Track listing ====
52 | ATL x BNA track listing
| No. | Title | Length |
|---|---|---|
| 1. | "Everybody Gotta Go Home" | 3:51 |
| 2. | "After the Wine Wears Off" | 3:30 |
| 3. | "Mansion" | 3:38 |
| 4. | "Unbroken" | 3:48 |
| 5. | "I'm with You" | 3:03 |
| 6. | "Tennessee Plates" | 2:46 |
| 7. | "Heart of Yours" | 3:09 |
| 8. | "The World Ain't as Bad (As You Think)" | 3:09 |
| 9. | "Gasoline" | 2:43 |
| 10. | "I'm Coming Around" | 3:39 |
| Total length: | | 33:21 |

=== 52 | In the Key of Summer ===
52 | In the Key of Summer

Studio album by Kristian Bush
- Released: June 24, 2022
- Genre: Country
- Length: 51:21
- Label: Big Machine

Singles from In the Key of Summer
- 1. "Everybody Needs a Somebody" Released: June 2, 2022; 2. "When This Shirt Was New" Released: June 2, 2022

In the Key of Summer is a collection of songs about the summer season. A fan of the summertime, the collection of songs features upbeat instrumentation and writing; his brother Brandon, who co-wrote the songs, described the music as "a beach song with a smile on it." Bush reflected this in the album, feeling that since Sugarland, his fans have recognized him as a positive musician. 15 of the 16 songs on the album were co-written with others, including Lindsay Ell and Ellis Paul, Brett Eldredge, Coy Bowles of the Zac Brown Band, and JT Harding. The lyrics of the songs are a reflection of emotions associated with summer, which Bush described as being a time to slow down and reflect.

"Everybody Needs a Somebody" and "When This Shirt Was New" released ahead of the album. The album released on June 24, 2022. After "When This Shirt Was New" was released, it was played a few times on The Bobby Bones Show.

==== Track listing ====
52 | In the Key of Summer track listing
| No. | Title | Length |
|---|---|---|
| 1. | "Hail Mary" | 3:01 |
| 2. | "Tangled Up" | 2:54 |
| 3. | "Everybody Needs a Somebody" | 3:57 |
| 4. | "When This Shirt Was New" | 3:07 |
| 5. | "The Mmm Song" | 2:58 |
| 6. | "Faded" | 2:55 |
| 7. | "House Band" | 3:01 |
| 8. | "Put a Smile on It" | 3:05 |
| 9. | "Headphones" | 2:49 |
| 10. | "Tequila" | 3:29 |
| 11. | "What Goes Up" | 3:13 |
| 12. | "Soft Place to Fall" | 3:13 |
| 13. | "Waking Up Lazy" | 3:01 |
| 14. | "Working My Way Down" | 3:24 |
| 15. | "Don't This Life Just Kill You" | 3:20 |
| 16. | "You Can't Stop the Sun from Going Down" | 3:36 |
| Total length: | | 51:21 |

=== 52 | New Blue ===
52 | New Blue

Studio album by Kristian Bush
- Released: September 30, 2022
- Genre: Country, rock
- Length: 51:21
- Label: Big Machine

Singles from New Blue
- 1. "Diamond Motel" Released: September 1, 2022; 2. "When's the Last Time" Released: September 1, 2022

New Blue is an alternative folk rock album. The plan was to make the album a collection of love songs. In the recording studio Bush accidentally found himself using similar song tricks that he used at his time in Billy Pilgrim in the 1990s, so he decided to intentionally use those elements in the songs. Growing up on rock music, Bush referred to the album as a "true conversation about where I came from". New Blue blends other genres of music beyond rock and country, including hip hop, R&B, pop, and gospel. The album is named after a line from the song "Put a Dent in It"; searching the term up online he came across scientist Mas Subramanian who accidentally discovered YInMn Blue, a new shade of blue. He selected this term to be the name of the album to reference his unique blend of genres.

New Blue has 12 songs, all of which Bush co-wrote with others, 3 of which with Chris Barron of the Spin Doctors. A fan of the Spin Doctors and a friend of Barron, he wanted to write a song that replicated music by the band. He featured Barron on the song "Sailing to Arizona", an anthem about taking chances, which Bush felt matched their style of music best. He wrote the song to match their bouncy and charismatic tone. "Crazy That Way" features vocals from Americana musician Stephanie Lambring. Other collaborators include Billy Steinberg, Matraca Berg, and Billy Montana. "Diamond Motel" and "When's The Last Time" released ahead of the album; the rest released on September 30, 2022.

==== Track listing ====
52 | New Blue track listing
| No. | Title | Length |
|---|---|---|
| 1. | "Diamond Motel" | 3:20 |
| 2. | "Sailing to Arizona" | 2:47 |
| 3. | "When's the Last Time" | 3:22 |
| 4. | "The Great American Scream Machine" | 4:03 |
| 5. | "Give Me a Road" | 2:44 |
| 6. | "Crazy That Way" | 3:25 |
| 7. | "Way with Words" | 3:22 |
| 8. | "Man Like Me" | 2:54 |
| 9. | "Somebody Promised You" | 3:56 |
| 10. | "Mirror Behind the Bar" | 3:10 |
| 11. | "New Girl" | 3:22 |
| 12. | "Put a Dent in It" | 3:43 |
| Total length: | | 40:11 |

=== 52 | This Year ===
52 | This Year

Studio album by Kristian Bush
- Released: March 10, 2023
- Genre: Country
- Length: 51:21
- Label: Big Machine

Singles from This Year
- 1. "Already Yours" Released: February 20, 2023

52 | This Year is a country album co-written with Andy Alberts and Andrew DeRoberts. The album focuses on melodies and themes of true love. It's also a reflection of Bush's experience in the music industry and what he learned from it. The title is derived from the lyrics on last song on the album, "New Year's Resolution #7", which Bush wrote on New Year's Day in 2016.

"New Year's resolution #7" consists of a list of what Bush wanted to change about himself and what should stay the same going into the new year. He referred to the song as "the closest you will probably ever get to knowing me". It was selected to be the last song of the collection to match the themes found in "Everybody Gotta Go Home" and "Tennessee Plates" from ATL x BNA; as those two songs discuss themes of death, "New Year's resolution #7" is about spending personal time with the people around you. "Already Yours", the first song on the album, released on February 20, 2023, and the album released on March 10.

==== Track listing ====
52 | This Year track listing
| No. | Title | Length |
|---|---|---|
| 1. | "Can't Fix" | 3:41 |
| 2. | "Already Yours" | 3:14 |
| 3. | "This Is How Love Sounds" | 3:34 |
| 4. | "The Space Between Us" | 3:42 |
| 5. | "If I Could Be" | 3:54 |
| 6. | "Let It Be Me" | 3:12 |
| 7. | "Love and Blue Jeans" | 2:57 |
| 8. | "Going Out of Business" | 2:32 |
| 9. | "Victory Lap" | 2:56 |
| 10. | "First Glass of Wine" | 3:54 |
| 11. | "Longneck with Jesus" | 4:05 |
| 12. | "What Love Is" | 3:43 |
| 13. | "If You Gotta Go Now" | 2:52 |
| 14. | "New Year's Resolution #7" | 3:22 |
| Total length: | | 47:45 |
