= Bloom (Billy Pilgrim album) =

Studio album by Billy Pilgrim
- Released: 1995
- Studio: Treasure Isle
- Label: Atlantic
- Producer: Richard Dodd

Billy Pilgrim chronology
Billy Pilgrim (1994)	Bloom (1995)	Live from Wildhack, MT (1999)

Bloom is the second album by the American musical duo Billy Pilgrim, released in 1995. The duo was dropped by Atlantic Records the following year.

The album peaked at No. 37 on Billboard's Heatseekers Albums chart. The first single was "Sweet Louisiana Sound", which was a minor radio hit. The duo promoted the album by playing shows with Blessid Union of Souls and labelmate Mary Karlzen, among others.

== Production ==
The album was produced by Richard Dodd. It was recorded at Treasure Isle Studios, in Nashville. The backing band included Mike Campbell, Sonny Landreth, and Garry Tallent.

== Critical reception ==
Professional ratings
Review scores
Source	Rating
AllMusic	2/5 stars
MusicHound Rock: The Essential Album Guide	3.5/5 stars

The Vancouver Sun wrote that "Sweet Louisiana Sound" "is an upbeat four-four kicker with a hint of a bayou twang that resists the duo's propensity for overly earnest, over-simplified, folk pop." The Columbus Dispatch called the album "better in almost every way than the group's self-titled debut: catchier, tougher when need be, lyrically more compelling."

The San Diego Union-Tribune determined that "the soaring vocal harmonies of Andrew Hyra and Kristian Bush and jamming rhythm guitars can invoke Don Henley and the Eagles." The Record deemed the album "outstanding," writing that "Billy Pilgrim makes folk-based pop music the way it was meant to be made." The Daily Herald concluded that Bloom "places the group somewhere between the jangly guitar-rock sound of the Gin Blossoms and Tom Petty and the Heartbreakers and the more countrified 'heartland rock' approach of the Jayhawks, Wilco and the BoDeans."

AllMusic wrote that, "although sonically consistent and clean, the overall feel of the album is a bit sterile, a tad slick, a touch predictable."

== Track listing ==
No.	Title	Length
1.	"Sweet Louisiana Sound"
2.	"Boyo"
3.	"Shallow"
4.	"Falling Apart"
5.	"Caroline"
6.	"I Won't Tell"
7.	"Need Your Love"
8.	"Carefully"
9.	"I Don't Know Much"
10.	"Watching"
11.	"All She Talks"
12.	"Lady of the Mist"
13.	"Closed Down"
