= The Incredible Machine (album) =

Studio album by Sugarland
- Released: October 19, 2010
- Recorded: October 2009 – April 2010
- Genre: Country
- Length: 42:20
- Label: Mercury Nashville
- Producer: Jennifer Nettles; Kristian Bush; Byron Gallimore

Sugarland chronology
Gold and Green (2009)	The Incredible Machine (2010)	Bigger (2018)

Singles from The Incredible Machine
- 1. "Stuck Like Glue" Released: July 26, 2010; 2. "Little Miss" Released: November 15, 2010; 3. "Tonight" Released: April 11, 2011

The Incredible Machine is the fifth studio album by American country music duo Sugarland. It was released on October 19, 2010, through Mercury Nashville Records. Byron Gallimore along with both members Jennifer Nettles and Kristian Bush teamed up for production of the album.

Upon its release, The Incredible Machine received mixed reviews from music critics. It debuted at number one on the US Billboard 200 chart, selling approximately 203,000 units in its first week and has since been certified Platinum by the RIAA. "Stuck Like Glue" served as the lead single, later peaking at number two on the Billboard Hot Country Songs chart.

== Content ==
In many interviews leading up to its release, both Nettles and Bush described the new album as "steampunk movement", best described as a branch of science fiction that imagines a world where humans evolved intellectually, but technology remained set in Victorian times. Nettles described it (emotionally) "as bungee jumping and eating chocolate cake, It's terrifying and gratifying, all at the same time". This description led fans and critics to believe that the album would have "steam engine sounds", and would also be a sharp deviation from the uptempo country for which they're known. Nettles apologized about the confusion in an interview with Entertainment Weekly, saying "That's really our fault for the way that we explained it, to be honest. It has everything to do with the visual. We wanted another world on stage. We wanted something fun, a visual aesthetic to be inspired by. We chose that one. It has nothing to do with the music".

Blake Boldt of Engine 145 described the first single, "Stuck Like Glue", as "A catchy twang-pop package" and that is "a fun mixture of accordion and mandolin, is a hooky earworm that begins to zero in on Sugarland’s vision of the musical future". Entertainment Weekly described the track "Wide Open" as "a propulsive rocker", and "Stand Up" as "pure inspiration in two-part harmony".

== Production and influences ==
During the recording of the album, Nettles and Bush had fun because they kept things loose in the studio and in the songwriting. "We had such a good time writing this record because we really allowed ourselves to play". Nettles continued saying, "As artists, we are always wanting to better ourselves and to develop our craft and to get better at not only reaching the human heart, but at . . . stretching ourselves to see who else we can bring into the country world and who else we can speak to. I'm always satisfied, but I don't know that I'll ever be complacent. There are different artists who musically end up following different paths. Some are more of the traditionalists, and I think that's great. We need that in every genre. And then some of us, like Kristian and myself, are more of the pioneers ... the explorers. We want to explore new territory and allow the genre to grow because, as we all know, if we don't grow we stagnate. So, especially now, it's a super fertile time in country music to allow it to grow".

Influences were drawn from English electronic group OMD, progressive rock musician Peter Gabriel, and the hair metal genre. AllMusic critic Thom Jurek felt that the album also borrowed from Joshua Tree-period U2, and post-New Gold Dream era Simple Minds.

== Promotion ==
In promotion of the album, the duo began "The Incredible Machine Tour", which kicked off in Primm, Nevada on April 23. The tour visited 63 cities through October 2011. The theme of the tour is inspired by steampunk, a style described by The New York Times as "a subculture that is the aesthetic expression of a time-traveling fantasy world, one that embraces music, film, design and ... fashion". Nettles also explained their reasoning behind the theme, saying "It started out as a literary movement in the '80s. Basically, it's based on the concept of 'if' during the Victorian era and the age of inventionism, If instead of moving and evolving toward the cyber-world that we're in now – with plastic and computer and silicon chips – what if we just kept it really romantic and organic and made it about steam engines and machines? So this, visually, was a beautiful launching pad for us and also the metaphors that can come from it". Bush commented saying, "We have this real interesting moment – that I'm not sure it happens a lot of the time in your career – where we were making an album, but at the same time, we were completely redesigning our presentation of our music. So the album itself reaches a little bit further to each of the new parts of who we are and our influences and the places that we love and was inspired kind of forwards and backwards by the development of the show at the same time". Prior to the release of the album, three promotional singles were released exclusively on Apple's iTunes Store as a "Countdown To: The Incredible Machine". The countdown began on September 28, with the release of "Incredible Machine" and continued with "Wide Open" being released on October 5, and "Little Miss" being released on October 12.

== Critical reception ==
Professional ratings
Review scores
Source	Rating
AllMusic	2.5/5 stars
American Songwriter	4/5 stars
Boston Herald	A
Country Weekly	3/5 stars
Entertainment Weekly	C+
Los Angeles Times	2.5/4 stars
Rolling Stone	2.5/5 stars
Roughstock	4.5/5 stars
Slant Magazine	1.5/5 stars
Uncut	1/5 stars

Upon its release, The Incredible Machine received generally mixed reviews from most music critics. At Metacritic, which assigns a normalized rating out of 100 to reviews from mainstream critics, the album received an average score of 52, based on 11 reviews, which indicates "mixed or average reviews".

Matt Bjorke of Roughstock was in high praise of the album, giving it four-and-a-half stars out of five and commenting, "The Incredible Machine may not be the ‘same-ol’ album and it certainly isn't something that's even remotely traditional country music but what the album turns out to be is a fantastic rumination on the human condition of life, love and the meaning of," and called it one of his favorite albums of the year. Bill Brotherton of the Boston Herald gave it an 'A' rating, and was in high praise of the album, noting Nettles' voice, comparing it to that of Melissa Etheridge, and noted the change of their country sound, saying, "as enjoyable as their previous albums have been, few could have predicted a work as jaw-droppingly incredible as this. Country it is not, and that might peeve some fans. This is a flat-out mainstream rock record." Rick Moore of American Songwriter gave it a four star rating, noting that the album was a drastic change in sound from their previous albums, and that "with The Incredible Machine, Sugarland has distanced itself even more from the Nashville mainstream [...] and this may well be the biggest country album this year that relies so much on keys; No fiddles or steel are anywhere to be found", and was in high praise of it, saying, "but as a project, The Incredible Machine succeeds big time, and may make these guys even less welcome to certain factions of Music Row as they continue to change the face of what is considered “country”." Sarah Rodman of The Boston Globe was in favor of the album, saying the duo was "on their game" with the release. She complimented the "[expansion of] the [music] playing field" that is on the album, and concluded saying "Is it country? Given the fluctuating definition of the format over the last 20 years some of it is and some of it isn’t. But the bigger question with any record regardless of genre should always be is it good? And The Incredible Machine is very good indeed". Chris Roberts of BBC Music gave it a positive review and said, "Ultimately you have to admire the precision tooling, the cunningly-gauged parallel levels of bigness and blandness, the ruthlessness – the only-too-plausible machine."

Jessica Phillips of Country Weekly gave it a three-stars-out-of-five rating, saying that the songs sounded "overly calculated", and that "Overall, the album more closely resembles pop punk and arena rock than what’s generally considered "country" music." Jon Caramanica of The New York Times gave it an average review. He criticized the sound and songwriting on the album, referring to some of the tracks as "reggae" and "gothic", and said the songwriting "lean[s] on bland inspirational platitudes or mystical gobbledygook". He noted the increased presence of Bush's voice on the album, referring to it as a "blatant error of judgment" and said "[his] anguished scrape is a heavy anchor pulling down "Stand Up," "Wide Open" and the many songs on which he sings harmony at the chorus." On a positive note, he called the track "Shine the Light" an "exception", saying, "it’s just Ms. Nettles here, singing while playing the piano, tossing her big voice around with ease. There’s a terrific soul cover album in her somewhere. It would be something worth leaving country behind for." Chris Willman of Entertainment Weekly gave it a C+ rating, saying, "Sugarland's latest [album] is essentially a full-blown rock album. There's nothing wrong with anthemic as an adjective, but it's troublesome when it gets made into its own genre."

Thom Jurek of AllMusic gave it a 2½-stars-out-of-five rating, and largely criticized the production of the album, saying, "while much is being made of how brave and challenging this record is, it's not. The Incredible Machine is a collection of (mostly) competent if unremarkable songs, held together by slick-- often sterile --production." J. Edward Keyes of Rolling Stone also gave it a 2½ rating, and criticized the sound of the album, saying, "Any remnants of country music left in Sugarland are wiped clean on The Incredible Machine, replaced by spit-shined arena pop [...] Sugarland are ruthless in their desire to leave no radio-ready trick untried, but in the end it's too much machine, not enough heart." Mario Tarradell of The Dallas Morning News gave it a 'C−' rating, criticizing Nettles' "grating" voice on the record and saying it "mak[es] the disc immediately hard-to-take". Randy Lewis of Los Angeles Times gave it 2½ stars out of four, saying it "might easily have [been] subtitled, The Arena Rock Album."

Jonathan Keefe of Slant Magazine was highly critical of the album, giving it a 1½ star rating. He criticized the sound of the album, saying "The choice of imagery never resolves into a greater aesthetic, which is disappointing, but the problems with styling are far less troubling than The Incredible Machine's actual music; [it] does stand to alienate at least some portion of their core fanbase, because it isn't a country album. Not even a little bit." He continued saying "What's most frustrating about the album is that Sugarland, even at their most pop-leaning, has repeatedly proven that they're capable of much better than this. Many country fans are going to dismiss the album simply because Sugarland has gone pop, when the far greater issue is that The Incredible Machine is just awful of its own accord". Stephen M. Deusner of Engine 145 gave it a two star rating, referring to it "a dud" and calling it "their Coldplay moment". Kevin John Coyne of Country Universe gave the album a 1½ star rating, referring to it as a "terrible album, an unmitigated disaster that manages to fail in ways that shouldn’t even be possible." Uncut gave the album only one star out of five and said, "The downhome strum of 'Stuck Like Glue' has a certain charm—at least until its horrific cod-dancehall break down—but fails to redeem a depressingly calculated record."

== Commercial performance ==
The album debuted at number one on the U.S. Billboard 200, and Top Country Albums chart, selling 203,000 copies in its first week of release. In its second week of release, the album dropped to number two on the Billboard 200 selling 89,000 copies. In its third week of release, the album dropped to number three on the Billboard 200, selling 60,000 copies. In its fourth week of release, the album dropped to number eight on the Billboard 200, selling 60,000 copies. As of the chart dated July 2, 2011, the album has sold 1,079,000 copies in the US.

== Singles ==
The first single, "Stuck Like Glue", was sent to radio stations on July 26, 2010, and debuted at #44 on the U.S. Billboard Hot Country Songs chart for the week of August 7, 2010. It also debuted on the Billboard Hot 100 at #20 shifting 93,000 downloads, making it the highest debut on that chart by a country music group or duo. Nettles commented on the song, saying it "is just plain, unashamed, Sugar-fun! It sticks in your brain, no pun intended. To me it feels young, hip and of course sassy”!

"Little Miss", the second single, was released on November 15, 2010, from The Incredible Machine, peaking at #11 Billboard Hot Country Songs.

"Tonight" followed as the album's third and final single, released on April 11, 2011, peaking at #32 Billboard Hot Country Songs.

== Track listing ==
All tracks are written by Jennifer Nettles and Kristian Bush, except where noted.

No.	Title	Writer(s)	Length
1.	"All We Are"		3:48
2.	"Incredible Machine"		5:01
3.	"Stuck Like Glue"	Nettles; Bush; Shy Carter; Kevin Griffin	4:07
4.	"Tonight"	Nettles; Bush; Griffin	4:33
5.	"Stand Up"		3:40
6.	"Incredible Machine (Interlude)"		1:28
7.	"Every Girl Like Me"		4:13
8.	"Little Miss"		4:31
9.	"Find the Beat Again"		2:59
10.	"Wide Open"		3:14
11.	"Shine the Light"	Nettles	5:03
Total length:			42:20

Deluxe edition DVD
No.	Title	Director/Producer	Length
12.	"Blood, Love, Hope, Lust, Steam"	Valarie Allyn Bienas	40:00
13.	"Incredible Machine"		4:13
14.	"Stuck Like Glue"	Declan Whitebloom; Tony McGarry	4:18

== Personnel ==
Sugarland

- Kristian Bush – acoustic guitar (all tracks except 6, 9, 10), electric guitar (all tracks except 8), vocals (all tracks except 7, 9), mandolin (8)
- Jennifer Nettles – vocals (all tracks except 6), piano (10)

Additional musicians

- Brandon Bush – organ (1, 4, 5, 7, 10), keyboards (1–4, 8, 9, 10), piano (2, 5, 6, 8, 10), accordion (3), programming (3, 10)
- Paul Bushnell – bass guitar (all tracks except 6 and 11)
- Matt Chamberlain – hi-hats (2), drums (7), percussion (7)
- Dan Dugmore – electric guitar (8)
- Kevin Griffin – percussion (3)
- Travis McNabb – drums (all tracks except 6, 7, and 11), percussion (3, 8, 9)
- Shy Carter – percussion (3)

Technical

- Keith Armstrong – mixing assistant
- Kristian Bush – producer
- Byron Gallimore – producer
- Tad Jansen – mastering
- Nik Karpen – mixing assistant
- Sara Lesher – additional recording
- Chris Lord-Alge – mixing
- Eric Lutkins – additional recording
- Steven Morrison – recording
- Jennifer Nettles – producer
- CJ Ridings – recording assistant
- Andrew Schubert – engineering
- Tom Tapley – recording
- Brad Townsend – engineering

== Chart positions ==
=== Weekly charts ===
Weekly chart performance for The Incredible Machine
Chart (2010)	Peak position
Australian Albums (ARIA)	47
Canadian Albums (Billboard)	2
Scottish Albums (OCC)	43
UK Albums (OCC)	43
UK Country Albums (OCC)	1
US Billboard 200	1
US Top Country Albums (Billboard)	1
US Indie Store Album Sales (Billboard)	8

=== Year-end charts ===
Year-end chart performance for The Incredible Machine
Chart (2010)	Position
US Billboard 200	52
US Top Country Albums (Billboard)	6
Chart (2011)	Position
US Billboard 200	33
US Top Country Albums (Billboard)	8

== Certifications ==
Country	Certification
United States	Platinum
