= Andrew Hyra =

American musician (born 1964)

- Born: February 2, 1964 (age 62); Bridgeport, Connecticut, U.S.
- Genres: Folk rock; country
- Occupations: Singer; songwriter
- Instruments: Vocals; acoustic guitar
- Years active: 1990–present
- Member of: Billy Pilgrim, Smokin' Novas

Andrew Hyra (born February 2, 1964), is an American singer, songwriter, and musician. He is one half of the folk rock duo Billy Pilgrim with singer, songwriter, and record producer Kristian Bush, and one half of the band Smokin' Novas with Atlanta, Georgia guitarist Brian Bristow.

Hyra began playing guitar in his mid-twenties in the late 1980s, later performing actively with his sister Annie as the Hyras. After collaborations with Bush on their debut albums, Hyra had Bush tour with him when Annie took a job in Miami, Florida. They later created the album St. Christopher's Crossing, and later Words Like Numbers, resulting in the two being signed on to Atlantic Records; Hyra coined the band name Billy Pilgrim. They released two records with Atlantic, Billy Pilgrim and Bloom, and toured worldwide including an opening slot with Melissa Etheridge, before being dropped in 1996.

Momentum with Billy Pilgrim fizzled out by 2000, with Hyra having his solo debut in 1999 with the album Spill, a collection of music. After a hiatus from music and a removed focus from music as his career he released his second solo album Curios in 2011. He formed the Smokin' Novas with Bristow in 2014, releasing the album's Smokin' Novas and Travel Mercies in the following years. Bush and Hyra made plans to reunite following Annie's death in 2019, and released their lost album In the Time Machine in 2020, among other collaborations.

== Personal life ==
Andrew Hyra was born February 2, 1964, in Bridgeport, Connecticut. He graduated from Choate Rosemary Hall in 1982 and from Tulane University with a bachelor's degree in history in 1987. He has three sisters, Dana, Annie, and actor Meg Ryan. He is married and has two daughters and currently resides in Mount Pleasant, South Carolina.

== Musical career ==
Hyra began playing the guitar in his mid-twenties, learning to play music by Bob Dylan and Bruce Springsteen, among others. He moved to Long Island, New York in the late eighties where his sister, Annie, was attending college. Finding that the two of them sounded good together, they wrote music; when they moved to Knoxville, Tennessee, the two had written four original songs and performed them at open mic nights in various clubs. One club owner was fond of the two and gave them a permanent opening slot for more established artists for about two years. They performed under the band name the Hyras.

=== 1990-1998: Billy Pilgrim ===
After a few months living in Knoxville, Hyra and his sister were approached by singer/songwriter Kristian Bush on summer break from Emory University, and shortly afterwards began performing with them. Bush had made a few contacts to studio owners from his college band, which they would use to record their first albums. The Hyras's first album Big Back Porch Songs featured Bush on guitar, and Bush's Politics and Pocketchange album featured Annie's vocals. The Hyras had booked a list of upcoming performances, but Annie would accept a job offer in Miami, Florida; Hyra requested Bush fill in, and he agreed. They moved to Atlanta, Georgia so Bush could attend college at Emory University.

The two performed for about a year with songs they have written over time, and rented two days of studio time in Knoxville to record an album, produced by Danny Brown. They recorded and mixed fourteen songs, released as St. Christopher's Crossing. With the release they began playing hundreds of shows in college towns in Atlanta. They would later attract the interest of an indie label, Sister Ruby, so the two recorded another album for them. Hyra considered the difference in quality between the two albums to be "exponential", which he considered to be because of their increasing confidence. The album was titled Words Like Numbers, coined by Hyra; it's derived from a line from Dont Look Back, a documentary about Bob Dylan, where Dylan referred to himself as a "mathematical songwriter" who used "words like numbers." The album was a success, attracting the attention of Atlantic Records, who signed them onto their label the same night of release. Hyra described the attention and series of events as "a whirlwind" of events. With the new label they decided to switch the name of the band. Hyra drafted up a list of names and they agreed with the one at the top; Billy Pilgrim, named after the character from the science fiction novel Slaughterhouse-Five.

The duo released the self-titled album Billy Pilgrim in 1993, in association with producers Don McCollister and Hugh Padgham, who had a group of London musicians overdub the master with additional instruments. Although the album itself received little attention, "Get Me Out Of Here" and "Insomniac", two songs on the album were, receiving heavy airplay on AAA radio. In 1995 they opened on a worldwide tour for Melissa Etheridge, but copies for Billy Pilgrim weren't made in time to be promoted throughout it, to Hyra's frustration. To increase their momentum, Atlantic Records made the two record another album in December 1994; unprepared, they scrambled to write new material two weeks ahead of the date of recording. They were paired with a group of veteran musicians who emphasized sounds that took away from their original music. Their second album, Bloom, released in 1995. The lead single "Sweet Louisiana Sound" was a critical success, making a full rotation on VH1. At their peak they "traveled all over the world together, just with two acoustic guitars and two voices." Critically the band was compared to various other bands, including The Rembrandts, R.E.M., and the dB's; Hyra grew accustomed to these comparisons, but criticized a Louisiana magazine for comparing them to Kenny Loggins, "of all people". Hyra referred to their relationships as "blood brothers" having been so young and new to the industry.

Sales for Bloom were underwhelming, and with increasing focus on Hootie and the Blowfish, Atlanta Records dropped the duo in 1996. Hyra was personally relieved, having felt he regained control that he lost under the record label. The two toured sporadically and planned to release a third album. Eventually, Hyra decided to move to California, describing it as his "wandering minstrel" phase, and wanted to explore more of the world without the pressure of corporate music. In 1997 Bush announced the two would release solo albums, but such plans never materialized at the time. They played a farewell tour in February 1998, but did not have an official break up.

=== 1999-2013: Solo career and Billy Pilgrim hiatus ===
Over the four years following being dropped by Atlantic Records, Hyra continued to write and perform solo music. In June 1999 he released Spill, a collection of unreleased music ranging from rock to acoustic. It was originally going to be a double album release, but shortened to one due to financial constraints. Bush performed on two of the songs, and Annie was originally planned to supply vocals, but such plans never happened and she was replaced by Elissa Hadley; Hyra said she "channeled Annie in a way".

In the late 1990s Bush released various demos, outtakes, and live performances of Billy Pilgrim on MP3.com, which helped finance another album. The album, Billy In the Time Machine, was recorded in four separate sessions over the course of eight months. It was scheduled to be released May 12, 2001. The final works the two made together before unofficially disbanding were compiled into masters tapes. The tapes were burned in a studio fire in late 2000. One copy was salvaged from the accident and made into a CD, of which 500 copies were made and distributed at their final performance in 2001 at Eddie's Attic. The band was never declared disbanded but the two lost contact with each other.

Following the hiatus, Hyra took a break from music and began working as a carpenter to spend more time with his family, and also not wanting to be recognized only for his success when he was young. He returned to regularly performing about 6 years later. He moved to Los Angeles, releasing the album Curios in 2011.

=== 2014-present: Smokin' Novas and Billy Pilgrim reunion ===
Hyra later relocated to Connecticut, and later South Carolina in 2014, where he would form the band Smokin' Novas with Atlanta guitarist Brian Bristow. They released a self-titled debut album in 2015, followed by a second album, Travel Mercies.

Hyra performed at Eddie's Attic with Bristow as the Smokin' Novas in 2016 and reunited with Bush during a solo set he was performing at the festival. Recognizing that Hyra was in attendance, he began playing "I Won’t Tell," a song from Billy Pilgrim's Bloom; Hyra joined him onstage, to Bush's surprise, and sang harmony. They performed various songs from the band for two hours. Bush said the following in a Rolling Stone interview:

"I was playing the song, and people started clapping and standing up, and I was like, ‘We’re not even in the good part of the song yet!’ Then I realized what was happening. Andrew was walking up. We sang the rest of the song together, and the harmonies sounded like they always did. After 15 years! It was beautiful and emotional. I turned to him afterwards and said, ‘So. . .I started this country band.'"

Plans to reunite the band were not made at the time, but Hyra performed background vocals on a studio demo for Bush the following week. Hyra said that music had become more of a casual endeavor for him. Annie Hyra died in 2019 and both Bush and his brother Brandon attended her funeral; Hyra credits this second reunion as the moment they both got in the headspace for recording and performing again. They declared it was time to get back together when Bush discovered he was in possession of a recording of In the Time Machine after cleaning out his house during the COVID-19 pandemic. They released a remastered version of the album, as well as re-releases of all of their works, in 2020. They performed a livestream at Eddie's attic, and Hyra planned to collaborate with Bush's other band Dark Water. In 2023 Hyra also appeared on 2 cuts of Bush's album This Year, including the lead single "Love and Blue Jeans". Hyra described the reunion, and therefore the sudden change in his life, as "a whirlwind" of events. Hyra is currently working on a solo album, Now and Then, set to release in 2024.

== Discography ==
=== Albums ===
- St. Christopher's Crossing (March 26, 1992 Sister Ruby)
- Words Like Numbers (March 18, 1993 Sister Ruby)
- Billy Pilgrim (October 6, 1994 Atlantic Recording Corporation)
- Bloom (October 19, 1995 Atlantic Recording Corporation)
- Spill (1999)
- In the Time Machine (April 12, 2001 Honest Harry)
- Curios (2011)
- Smokin' Novas (2015)
- Travel Mercies (2015)

=== Production credits ===
- 1992 St. Christopher's Crossing - Billy Pilgrim
- 1992 Christmas Present 1992 - Various Artists (Billy Pilgrim, "Let It Snow")
- 1993 Words Like Numbers - Billy Pilgrim
- 1994 Billy Pilgrim - Billy Pilgrim
- 1994 True Story - Various Artists (Billy Pilgrim, "Last American Poet")
- 1995 Bloom - Billy Pilgrim
- 1995 You Sleigh Me: Alternative Christmas Hits - Various Artists (Billy Pilgrim, "The First Noel")
- 1999 Snow Globe - Billy Pilgrim
- 2000 BeSides - Billy Pilgrim
- 2000 Nine Twenty Three - Billy Pilgrim
- 2001 In the Time Machine - Billy Pilgrim

=== Other credits ===
- 1992 Better Days - Shawn Mullins
- 1995 Yelling at Karlzen - Mary Karlzen
- 1999 The First Ten Years - Shawn Mullins
- 2000 Last of the Old Time - Chuck Brodsy ("Take it Out Back")
- 2020 Hold Me In - High on Stress
- 2023 This Year - Kristian Bush ("Love and Blue Jeans")
- 2023 This Year - Kristian Bush ("Longneck With Jesus")
