= Jaida Dreyer =

American-Canadian country music singer/songwriter

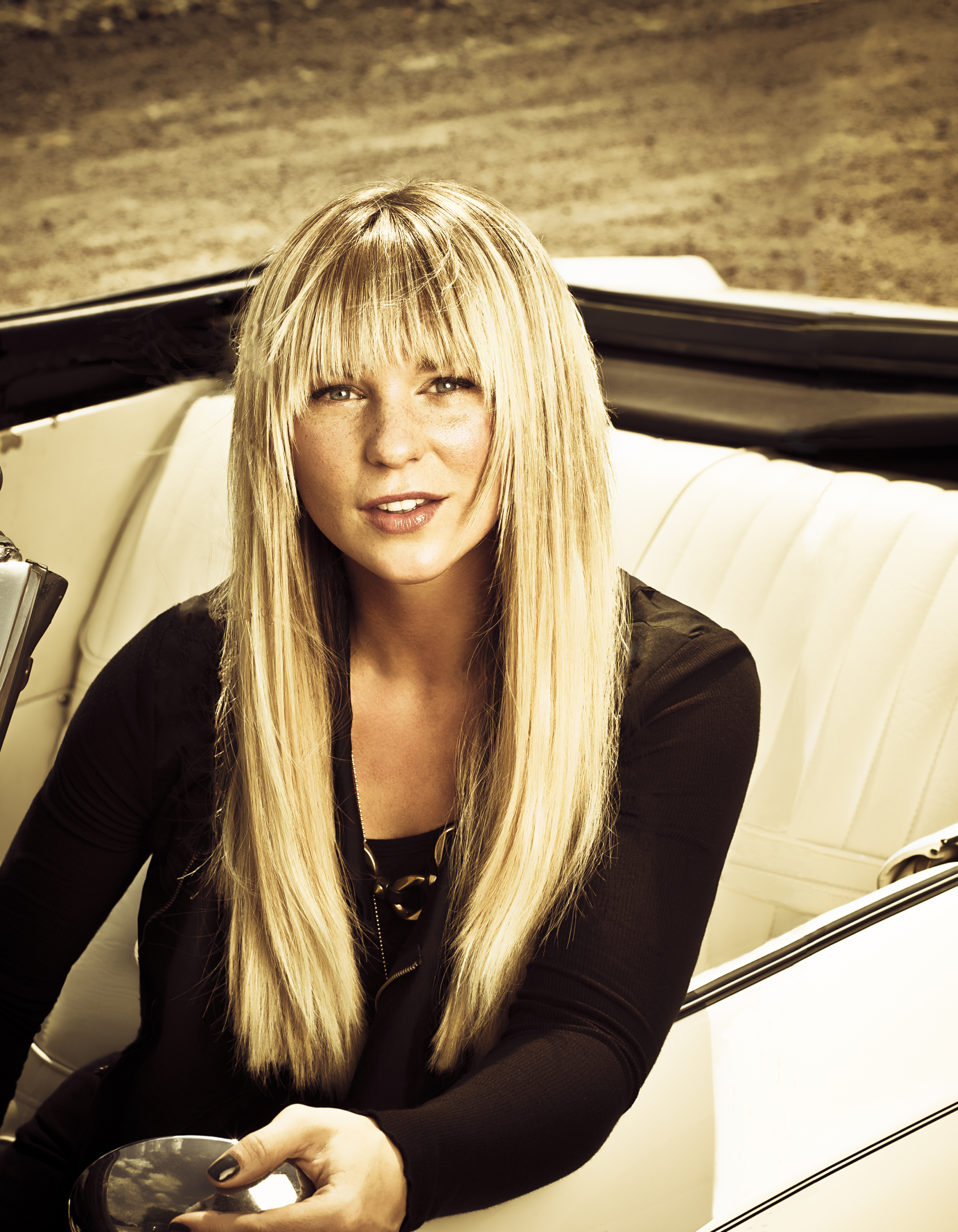

Background information
- Born: Thunder Bay, Ontario
- Origin: Latimer, Iowa
- Genres: Country
- Occupation(s): Singer, songwriter
- Instrument(s): Vocals, background vocals, guitar, mandolin
- Years active: 2012–present
- Labels: Streamsound

Jaida Dreyer is an American-Canadian country music singer and songwriter. She was signed as the flagship artist on Streamsound Records, a label founded in 2012 by Byron Gallimore.

== Biography ==
Dreyer debuted in 2012 with the singles "Guy's Girl" and "Confessions", both of which charted on Hot Country Songs. She also wrote "Home Alone Tonight" was recorded by country music artist Luke Bryan as a duet with Karen Fairchild of Little Big Town for his fifth studio album, Kill the Lights (2015). The song was performed on the American Music Awards and followed with a multi-week number 1 single.

In early 2013, Deyer released her third single, "Half Broke Horses". Dreyer's debut album, I Am Jaida Dreyer, was released on February 26, 2013. Dreyer wrote nine songs for the ABC's television musical drama, Nashville. "Dreams" was performed by Hayden Panettiere's character Julliette Barnes and "This Town" performed by Clare Bowen's character Scarlett O'Connor.

She competed as a contestant on the USA Network's Real Country show in 2018, and was crowned the winner of its inaugural season.

== Discography ==
=== Albums ===
Title	Album details
I Am Jaida Dreyer	Release date: February 26, 2013; Label: Streamsound Records; Formats: CD, music download

=== Singles ===
Year	Single	Peak chart positions		Album
Year	Single	CAN Country	US Country	Album
2012	"Guy's Girl"	32	55	—
2012	"Confessions"	—	57	I Am Jaida Dreyer
2013	"Half Broke Horses"	20	—	I Am Jaida Dreyer
"—" denotes releases that did not chart

=== Music videos ===
Year	Video
2012	"I Saw Mommy Kissing Santa Claus"
2013	"Half Broke Horses"

== Awards and nominations ==
Year	Award	Category	Result
2013	Canadian Radio Music Awards	Country ("Guy's Girl")	Nominated
2013	Canadian Country Music Association	Female Vocalist of the Year	Nominated
