= Billy Pilgrim (duo) =

American folk rock duo

- Origin: United States
- Genre: Folk
- Years active: 1991–2001; 2016; 2023–present
- Label: Atlantic
- Members: Andrew Hyra; Kristian Bush

Billy Pilgrim (often stylized billy pilgrim) is an American folk rock duo based in Atlanta, Georgia, composed of Andrew Hyra and Kristian Bush. The band's name was taken from the time-traveling antihero of Kurt Vonnegut's novel Slaughterhouse-Five. The name was adopted in 1994; prior to that the duo simply billed itself as Andrew Hyra and Kristian Bush. The band has released two albums on a major record label (Billy Pilgrim, Bloom) and several independently. The songs "Get Me Out of Here" and "Sweet Louisiana Sound" were released as singles.

== History ==
Kristian Bush and Andrew Hyra (the brother of actress Meg Ryan) first began performing together in 1990 in Knoxville, Tennessee. After about a year, they started recording their songs to tape. The self-release St. Christopher's Crossing was recorded in two days in a studio in Knoxville and appeared in 1991 (credited to "Andrew Hyra & Kristian Bush") on cassette. The album was released on CD in 1992 when Amy Ray of Indigo Girls helped them with the release costs. Playing hundreds of shows in the Southeast, their effort was noticed and they proceeded to record their second album Words Like Numbers under the indie label Sister Ruby.

After this they signed to Atlantic Records, naming the group Billy Pilgrim. In 1993, Billy Pilgrim recorded their debut album Billy Pilgrim at Nickel and Dime Studios, with Don McCollister producing and Hugh Padgham mixing the record. The eponymous album was a moderate success when released in 1994.

With the next album, Bloom, the band launched a fall tour, headlining larger venues than they had in the past. Yet in early 1996, the band was dropped by Atlantic. They then released several albums through Internet only. The band stopped playing together in 2000, and the album In the Time Machine became their last effort to date, released on May 12, 2001.

Both Hyra and Bush have since released solo albums and worked with other musicians. Bush formed the country music group Sugarland in 2002 with Jennifer Nettles and Kristen Hall (who left in 2006, reducing Sugarland to a duo). Hyra released a solo album, Lost Songs, in 2006 and another, Curios, in 2011. Hyra is now in a band with Brian Bristow called the Smokin' Novas.

In 2016 Billy Pilgrim reunited during the annual Thanksgiving shows Kristian Bush gave in Decatur, Georgia, the first time in 15 years they shared the stage. They reunited for several shows in 2023, and in 2024 the duo played the Grand Old Opry. Their tour included three sold-out shows at Eddie's Attic outside Atlanta, where the duo played frequently at the start.

== Insomniac ==
Their 1994 single "Insomniac", written by Bush, became widely performed by numerous a cappella groups despite never charting. The song was transcribed by ear and arranged for a cappella groups by John Craig Fennell, a University of Virginia graduate student and member of its Virginia Gentlemen vocal group. Their recording of the song was then included in a compilation album of college a cappella songs distributed by Tufts University student Deke Sharon. Groups at other colleges then began performing the song themselves, often by transcribing the Virginia Gentlemen recording itself by ear. In 2024, The New York Times called the song "a staple of a cappella groups all over the country at all levels"

== Discography ==
Billy Pilgrim has released albums from 1991 - 2001.

=== Official albums ===
- Billy Pilgrim (January 1994)
- Bloom (May 1995) - Billboard Heatseekers #37

=== Independent releases ===
- St. Christopher's Crossing as Kristian Bush & Andrew Hyra (1991, cassette; 1992 CD)
- Words Like Numbers as Andrew Hyra & Kristian Bush (1993, 1994 re-issue)
- Live From Wildhack, MT (September 1999)
  - recorded live at Eddie's Attic in Decatur, Georgia in December 1998
- beSides (May 2000)
- Nine Twenty Three (09.23.00) (November 2000)
  - recorded live at Eddie's Attic in Decatur, Georgia on 23 September 2000
- In The Time Machine (June 2001; re-released September 2020)

=== Singles ===
- "Hurricane Season" (1994 USA)
- "Insomniac" (1994 USA)
- "Get Me Out Of Here" (1994, Germany)
- "Try" (1994 USA Promo only)
- "Sweet Louisiana Sound" (1995)

=== Other songs ===
- "The First Noel" (1995 on Atlantic holiday compilation "You Sleigh Me")
