= Kristian Bush =

American singer-songwriter (born 1970)

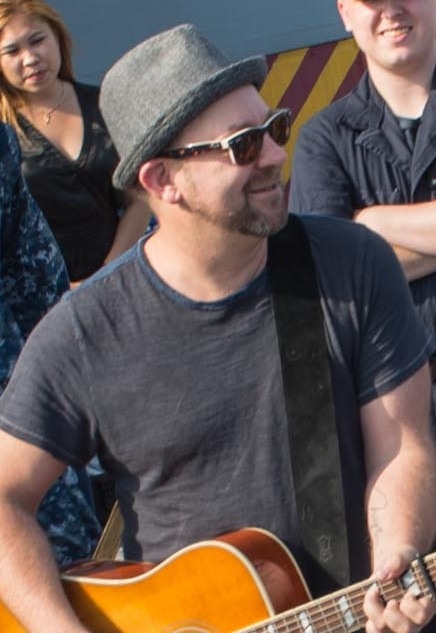
- Bush in 2015

Background information
- Born: Kristian Merrill Bush; March 14, 1970 (age 56)
- Origin: Knoxville, Tennessee, U.S.
- Genres: Folk rock; country
- Occupations: Singer; songwriter; record producer
- Instruments: Vocals; mandolin; acoustic guitar; electric guitar; harmonica
- Years active: 1990–present
- Labels: Atlantic; Big Machine; Mercury Nashville; Streamsound; Wheelhouse
- Member of: Sugarland, Billy Pilgrim, Dark Water
- Website: kristianbush.com

Kristian Merrill Bush (born March 14, 1970) is an American singer, songwriter, and record producer. Bush is one half of the country music duo Sugarland with Jennifer Nettles, and was a member of the folk rock duo Billy Pilgrim with Andrew Hyra. In addition to his work in these two groups, Bush released one solo album, Southern Gravity, via Streamsound Records in 2015, and four solo albums via Big Machine Records, 52 ATL x BNA, 52 | In The Key Of Summer, 52 | New Blue, and 52 | This Year in 2022 and 2023. In 2023 Bush also released an EP titled Drink Happy Thoughts on his own label Songs Of The Architect.

== Early life ==
Kristian Bush was born in Knoxville, Tennessee. Bush was raised outside of Knoxville in Sevierville, Tennessee, a small town at the base of the Smoky Mountains that was also the hometown of Dolly Parton. He is the great-great-grandson of A.J. Bush, founder of Bush Brothers and Company; it was expected for him to run a cannery. He was exposed to instruments from an early age, and picked up his first violin at age 4. During these early years, Bush, alongside younger brother Brandon, made his musical debut at the local Bush Beans Jamboree performing as Parton's opening act. His grandparents made a "weird deal" when he was 12 and lost the Bush Brothers company, a deal they were ultimately bitter about, but it allowed Bush to grow up and be whatever he wanted.

Throughout childhood, Bush was enrolled in violin lessons and classically trained under the Suzuki method at the University of Tennessee. The family eventually relocated to Knoxville and by age 11, Bush agreed to play one season in the Knoxville Youth Symphony, before earning the right to lay the violin down for good and start learning the guitar. As a teenager, Bush stuck with the guitar and began to create original music. It wasn't long before he was writing his own songs and recording homemade albums. He did swimmer electives throughout high school and college, and would write music in his head to the rhythm of his swimming strokes.

Bush attended Avon Old Farms Boarding School in Avon, Connecticut, graduating in 1988. He then attended Emory University in Atlanta, earning a degree in creative writing. During college, Bush began to connect with Atlanta's growing music scene, often begging his way into clubs, witnessing first-hand success from bands like R.E.M. and (fellow Emory students) the Indigo Girls.

== Musical career ==
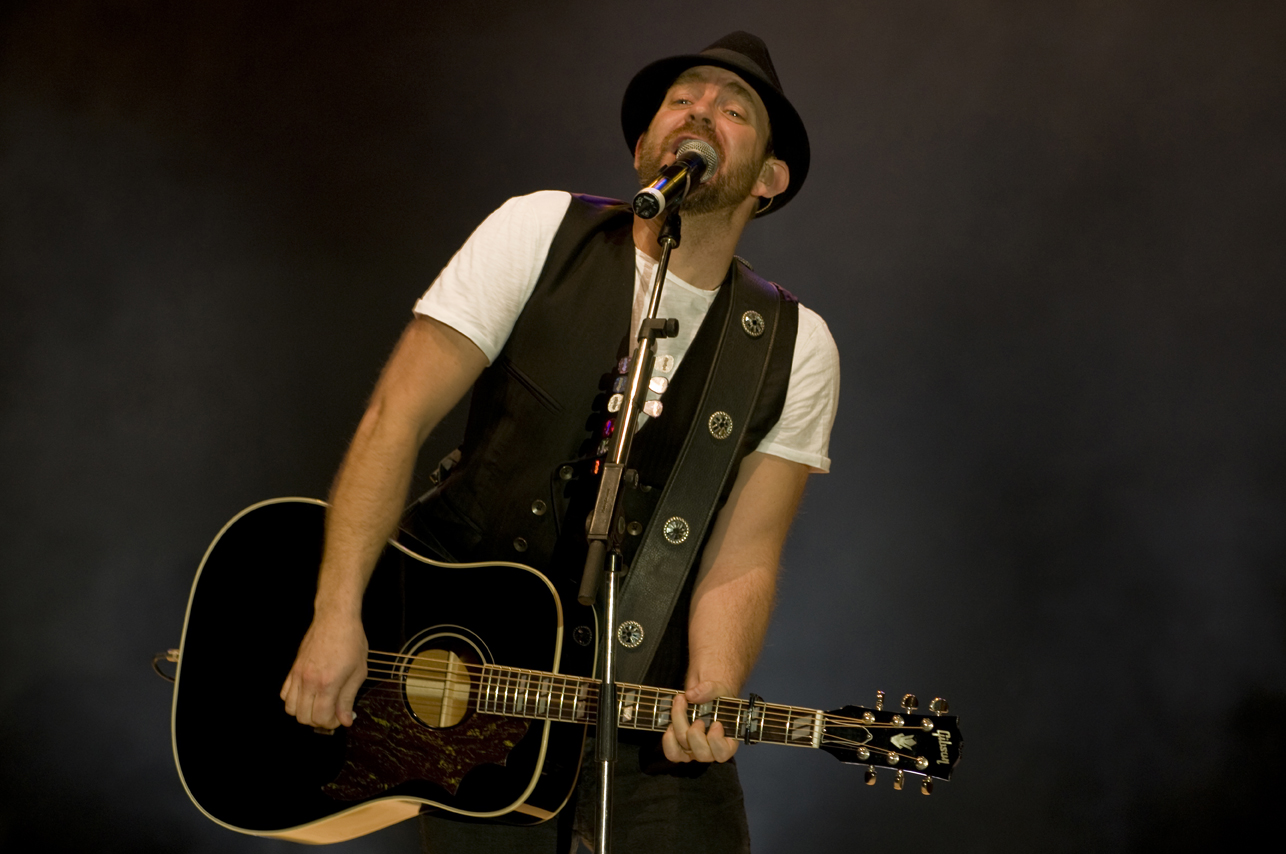
Bush performing at the Ramstein Air Base in Germany in 2008

While attending Emory University, Bush was the lead singer and guitarist in the rock band Storyteller, with fellow Emory students Chris "Tex" Nolter (bass, guitar) and Jon Slatkin (drums). Storyteller covered the Replacement's "I Can't Wait”, Rod Stewart's "Maggie May”, The English Beat's "Mirror in the Bathroom", and Jane's Addiction's "Jane Says”, among other songs, and they performed at numerous bars, campus events and parties in Atlanta.

To date, Bush has won six BMI Awards for his songwriting abilities, and in 2011 he founded the music publishing company and songwriting collective Songs of the Architect. Recent producing and songwriting collaborations include Ellis Paul, Laura Bell Bundy, Matt Nathanson, the dB's, Martin Johnson of Boys Like Girls, Pretty Little Liars star Lucy Hale, and up-and-comers including Kristina Train, Larkin Poe, Canaan Smith, Lauren Alaina, Jaida Dreyer and Alana Springsteen.

=== 1990–2001: Billy Pilgrim ===
Shortly after completing college, Bush introduced himself to Atlanta songwriter Andrew Hyra and his sister Annie, who were performing at a club in Knoxville; the two had recently moved there after completing college. In 1990, Bush played guitar and sang backup vocals on Big Back Porch Songs, an album by the Hyras. Big Back Porch Songs was never released but Bush was given a copy. Bush released an album shortly afterwards, Politics and Pocketchange, which the Hyras were featured on. Bush and Andrew Hyra began performing together using connections that Bush made from his time in Storyteller, writing original songs in the meantime. The Hyras had made plans for future performances, but Annie had accepted a job in Miami, Florida; Bush replaced her.

After a year of performing, the two drove to Knoxville where they rented two days of studio time, where they recorded 14 original songs, assisted by their producer Danny Browns. The two released their first album together in 1991, St. Christopher's Crossing, independently under the credit Andrew Hyra and Kristian Bush. They continued performing shows in southeastern college towns, and Bush reached out to various talent agents with their demos; Jen Stark, an intern at Atlantic Records, received a copy, which resulted in commotion about them amongst the company. An indie label, Sister Ruby, expressed interest in the duo, and the two made another album for the label; it emphasized songs that weren't used for St. Christophers's Crossing, which were quieter songs that couldn't be played in loud clubs. The album was called Words Like Numbers. Bush cited a large improvement between the two albums, because "with St. Christopher's we didn't think, we just did it. This time we had several weeks to think about what we were recording." The album was a success in garnering attention; Atlantic Records held a release party for the two, and they were signed to the label that night, in New York. The duo name was officially changed to Billy Pilgrim, named after a character from Kurt Vonnegut's novel Slaughterhouse-Five.

The duo released the self-titled album Billy Pilgrim in 1994, in association with producer Hugh Padgham, who had a group of London musicians overdub the master with additional instruments. Although the album itself received little attention, "Get Me Out Of Here" and "Insomniac", two songs on the album were, receiving heavy airplay on AAA radio. In 1995 they opened on a worldwide tour for Melissa Etheridge, but copies for Billy Pilgrim weren't made in time to be promoted throughout it. To increase their momentum, Atlantic Records made the two record another album in December 1994; unprepared, they scrambled to write new material two weeks ahead of the date of recording. They were paired with a group of veteran musicians who emphasized sounds that took away from their original music. Their second album, Bloom, released in 1995. The lead single "Sweet Louisiana Sound" was a critical and commercial success, making a full rotation on VH1. At their peak they "traveled all over the world together, just with two acoustic guitars and two voices."

Sales for Bloom were underwhelming, and with increasing focus on Hootie and the Blowfish, Atlantic Records dropped the duo in 1996. The two toured sporadically, working on an album for a 1996 release, which never surfaced. Hyra moved to California but still kept in contact with Bush. Billy Pilgrim, like Bush, became inactive for a period; during this time, he occasionally performed at Eddie's Attic and produced work for artists such as Ellis Paul, Beth Wood, and Evan and Jaron. In 1997, Bush announced that both he and Hyra were working on separate solo albums; however, neither album was released. The duo later embarked on a ‘farewell’ tour, which was intended as a hiatus, though reports mistakenly circulated that they were disbanding.

==== 1999–2001: Billy Pilgrim hiatus ====
In 1999, Bush took interest in the newly developing format of online music distribution. He began releasing demos, outtakes, and live performances from Billy Pilgrim on the website MP3.com. He appreciated that he was able to release music easily without anyone else's approval. Bush partnered with MP3.com to release an old live performance of Billy Pilgrim at Eddie's Attic in 1998, Live from Wildhack, MT, on the website. The performance also contained unreleased songs. Billy Pilgrim released Snow Globe, a Christmas album, in November 1999, and 9/23/00, another live performance from Eddie's Attic, released towards the end of the year.

Bush used the money earned from the MP3.com downloads to fund the next album and its physical release. The album, Billy In the Time Machine, was recorded in four separate sessions over the course of eight months. Bush cited U2's The Joshua Tree and Thom Yorke as inspiration for the album. It was released May 12, 2001. The final works the two made together before unofficially disbanding were compiled into masters tapes. The tapes, as well as their studio, burned in a fire in late 2000. One copy was salvaged from the accident and made into a CD, of which 500 copies were made and distributed at their final performance in 2001 at Eddie's Attic. The band was never declared disbanded but the two lost contact with each other.

=== 2001–2012: Sugarland ===
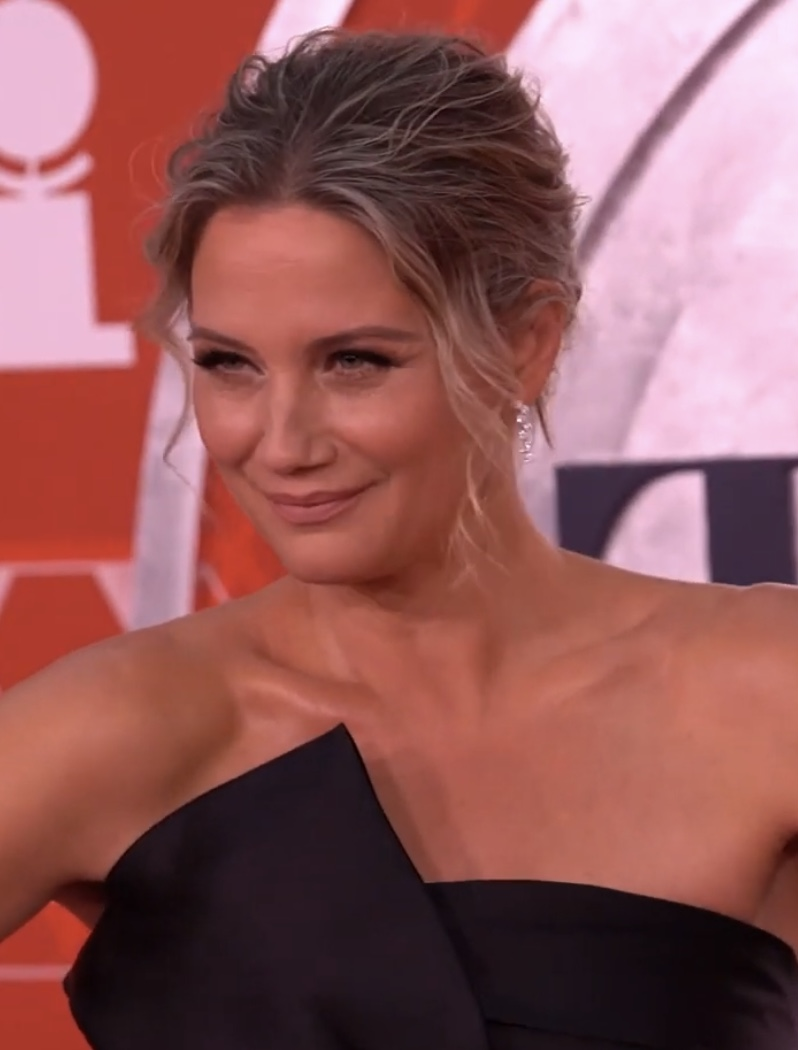
Jennifer Nettles is the other half of Bush's duo band Sugarland.

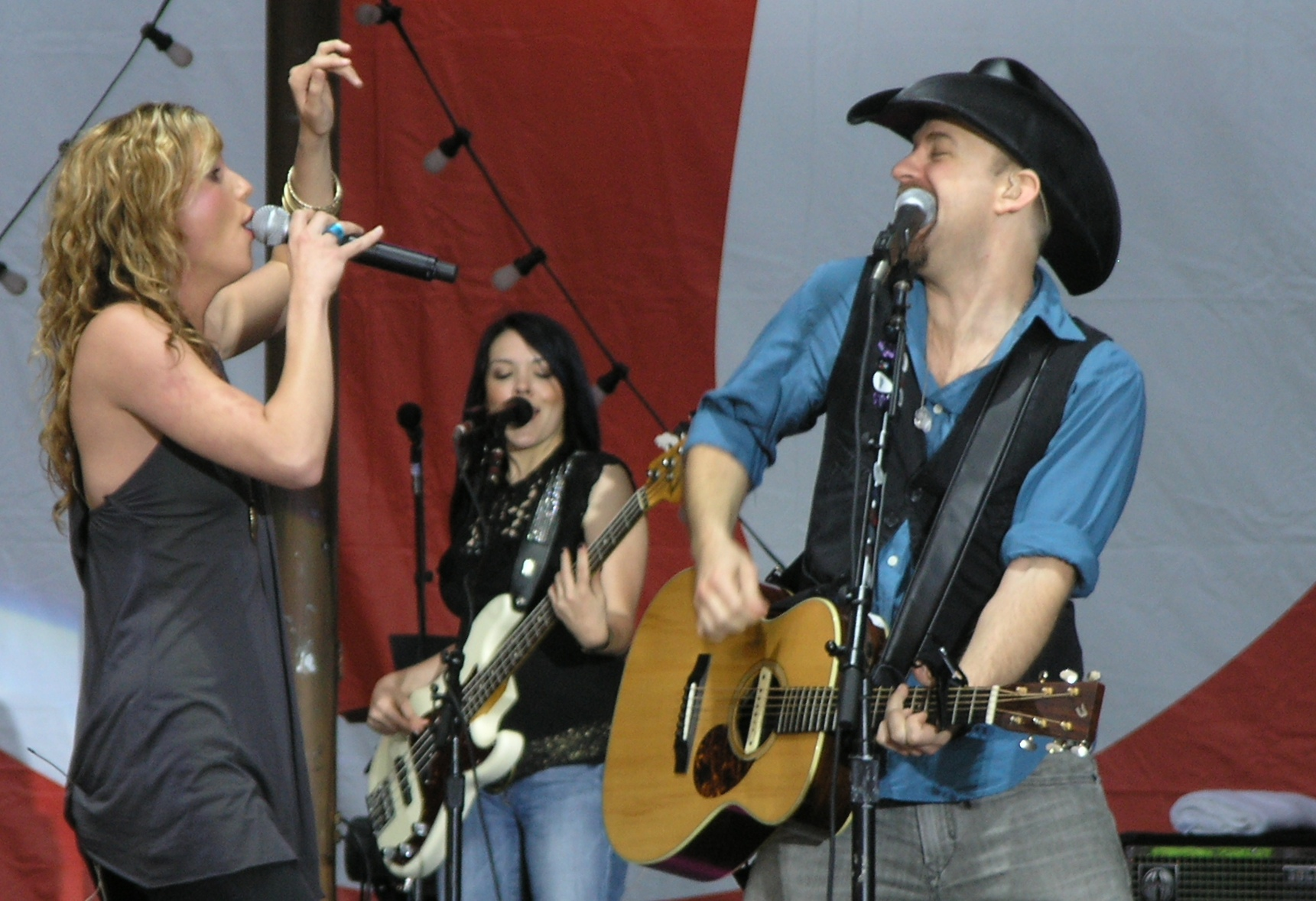
Bush performing alongside Jennifer Nettles (left) in 2007

At the same time Bush was performing occasionally at Eddie's Attic, so was singer-songwriter Jennifer Nettles; she had begun performing there at their open mic competitions and was eventually given a recurring performing gig. Nettles had recently concluded her time in other bands and met Atlanta singer-songwriter Kristen Hall at a bar and discussed their country music endeavors together. Bush later discussed starting a band with Hall in 2002 and held auditions for the lead singer; Nettles was fifth to audition, and Bush said she "blew it out of the water". In 2003, Bush met with the two at a Starbucks to discuss starting a band together; the trio officially formed Sugarland the next day. The name was suggested by Hall; its derived from the town of Sugar Land, Texas, and was picked since it reflected the "sweet" tone of the band.

At least one of the three artists wrote or co-wrote all 11 songs on their first album, Twice the Speed of Life. All three worked on the lead single "Baby Girl". Bush described the experience as his "second first record", understanding the experience and knowing the pressure associated with the first attempt. The trio treated the album like a side project to their other musical endeavors, but understood the potential of it over time. The songs were written roughly around 2001. In a notably dark period of Bush's life, in light of the downfall of Billy Pilgrim, the death of his mother, and the recent September 11 attacks, he wrote songs that were lighthearted and depicted a life that he wanted to live. They found success performing live in Knoxville, and Bush bought his first cowboy hat on eBay in 2003 to prove to his friends he was taking the new endeavor seriously. They eventually received the attention of Mercury Nashville in 2004, and landed a recording deal with them to release an album.

Sugarland broke through in 2004 with the release of their debut single "Baby Girl", the first single from their multi-platinum debut album Twice the Speed of Life. The trio became a duo in 2006, when they also released their second album, Enjoy the Ride. This album produced their first two No. 1 singles (in the U.S.), "Want To" and "Settlin'", and won the duo a Grammy for "Stay". In 2008 they released their third album, titled Love on the Inside. This album produced three more No. 1 singles with "All I Want to Do", "Already Gone"and "It Happens". Their fourth album, The Incredible Machine was released on October 19, 2010, in both a standard and deluxe edition. Upon The Incredible Machine being certified platinum, Sugarland has sold in excess of 14 million records. Nettles and Bush also write all of the band's songs. In October 2012, they were inducted into the Georgia Music Hall of Fame.

They have surpassed sales of over 22 million albums worldwide, achieved five No. 1 singles and won numerous awards, including trophies from the Grammys, American Music Awards, Academy of Country Music Awards, CMT Music Awards and CMA Awards.

==== 2011–2013: Stage collapse and Sugarland hiatus ====
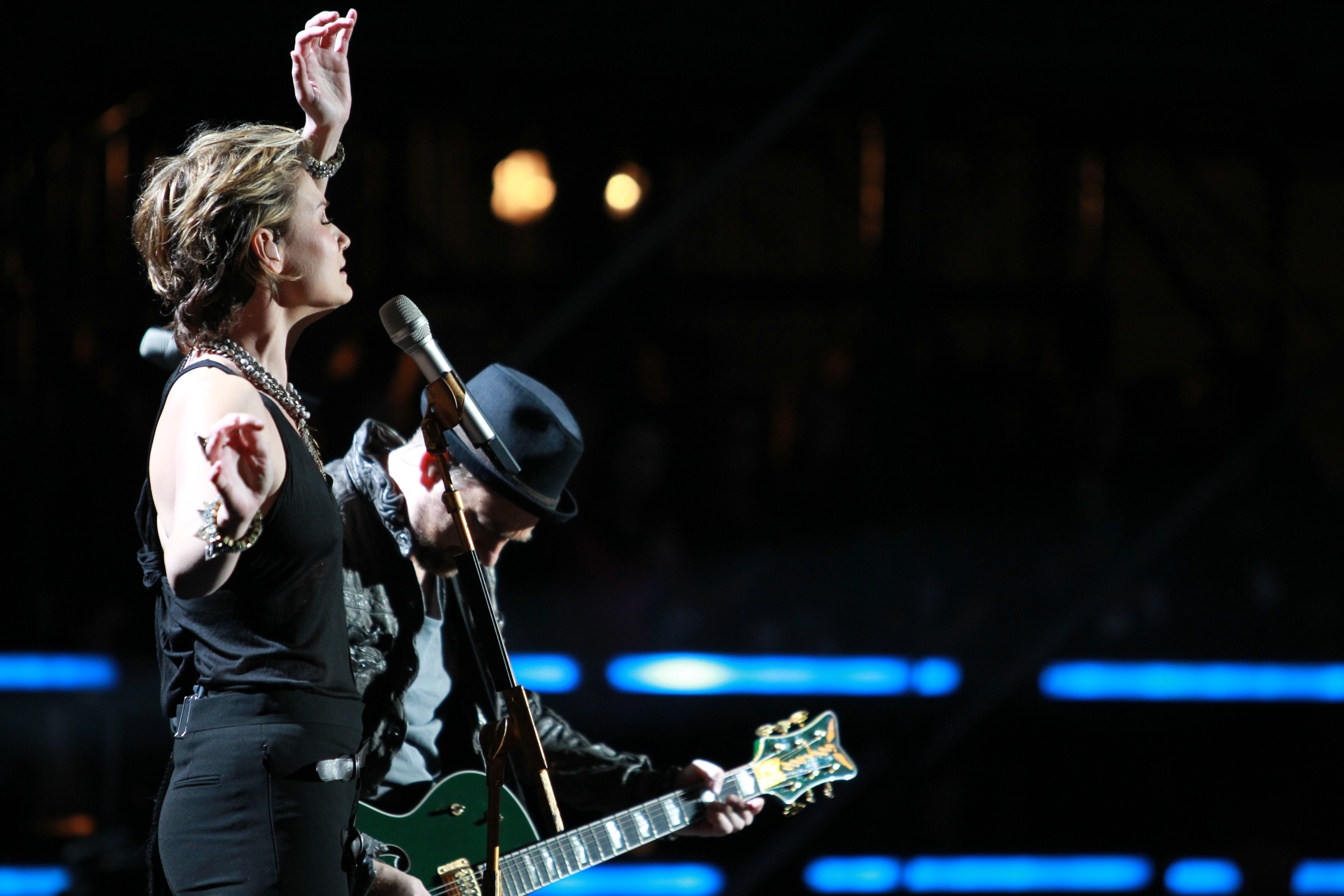
Bush performing with Nettles in December 2011

On August 13, 2011, during their Incredible Machine Tour at the Indiana State Fair, the stage collapsed due to high winds, killing seven people and injuring 58 others. At the moment of collapse, Indiana State Fair director Cindy Hoye and state police captain Brad Weaver were approaching the stage to announce the concert's cancellation. Bush, under the stage in a dressing room, felt the quake and witnessed flying debris break down the stage door and fill the hallway; he had thought a bomb went off. In the immediate aftermath of the collapse he, Nettles, and other crew downstairs were not allowed to leave; crew members attempted to leave but were kept from doing so. Bush was unaware of what happened and was kept in the dark for a long time. He was eventually evacuated to his bus but was forced to remain on the scene. He recalled "all sorts of silence" as Nettles and the downstairs crew watched footage of the accident on the news. Bush wrote the following on their Sugarland website:

"Our fans just came to see a show, and it ended in something terrible. My heart is totally broken for the families and friends of those who lost their lives. It's broken for all the people who got hurt, for the people who were scared. I thank God for every person who lifted a truss, who pushed against that metal to get it off someone; for every person who used a chair as a stretcher. I thank God for every fan and emergency responder, for everyone who ran to the trouble instead of away from it. The courage of those men and women will forever be with me."

In years following, especially the immediate days following the event, Bush was discouraged from talking about the accident due to pending lawsuits. Sugarland cancelled one upcoming concert and performed two more, concluding the Incredible Machine Tour in October 2011.

Sugarland announced they would be going on hiatus for a few months to consider their next steps forward. Bush returned home and continued working out the details of his pending divorce, finalizing it in November 2011. In light of the stage collapse and what talking about it publicly would mean for his children, he refrained from openly discussing the divorce as well. Within the same month Nettles got married and informed Bush that she was pregnant, and that she wanted to do a solo album, since she wanted more time to experience new things and focus on her family.

The two agreed to put the band on hiatus indefinitely. Fulfilling their pre-established plans, Bush's final performance as Sugarland before the hiatus was at Mandalay Bay Resort and Casino on September 2, 2012. Without the band Bush's schedule was completely empty, which he found "anxiety-driving". Unsure of what to do going forward, Bush purchased a house in Nashville and began reaching out and working with established songwriters in the area, accepting any work that was offered to him. Unable and struggling to freely discuss his circumstances, he began expressing himself through songwriting. Bush mainly wrote music only when he needed to for Sugarland, but now found himself writing songs constantly.

"You could hear me, but I couldn't tell you."

— Kristian Bush discussing his circumstances and Southern Gravity, 2015 The Tennessean interview

Bush was encouraged by the people around him to write a solo album. At first he was reluctant to do so, believing that doing so would hurt the image of Sugarland. Byron Gallimore, Sugarland's producer, ensured him that since he was never the primary singer of the band, he wouldn't replace Sugarland on country radio. He began considering the venture, and looked through what songs he had written following the hiatus; he was surprised to find he had a collection of 300 recorded songs, and focused on what collection of songs he should release first. He began playing and writing for those he had worked with in the past, although they were reluctant to give him an opportunity because they did not know anything about how he performed separately; he realized then that the momentum from Sugarland would not carry over into his potential solo career.

=== 2013–2016: Solo career ===
In July 2013, after being drawn to the music and design of the mobile app My Singing Monsters while watching his son play, he expressed his praise of the game on Twitter. The game's director Dave Kerr responded suggesting a collaboration and Bush agreed, performing the mandolin for a monster representation of himself, the "Shugabush". The following October, Bush was invited to perform at the inaugural C2C: Country to Country festival at the O2 Arena in London, England. The trip inspired him to release a song as a single to play there, resulting in his solo debut with the song "Love or Money", performed with a full band. The entire audience sang the chorus back to him. The song released in the United States on October 10, 2013. My Singing Monsters would later feature a cover of "Love or Money" (called "Shugabush Island"), with Bush doing a gibberish rendition of the lyrics. Bush also hosted "Music Mondays" on his website, where he released his works and discussed the story behind it. He found himself writing and recording music much more frequently, purposefully not thinking about where or when the song would be released. On average he was making about 160 songs a year.

"We wanted to start with a story that embodied the greatness and power of country music. His studio burned down, his mom passed and he gathered the fortitude to keep going. That’s really where Sugarland came from. When you bring in the success that is Sugarland, this tragedy of the Indiana State Fair stage collapse, then he went on another journey after that — what you end up with is great music and this kind of epic journey of a guy who loves making music."

— Stokes Nielson, director and producer of Walk Tall: The Journey of Sugarland's Kristian Bush

In 2014, Bush signed for Gallimore's Streamsound Records as a solo artist. Gallimore noticed that Bush was hiding a lot when it came to his current situation, and recognized that it was a "very, very painful" time for him. Two songs on the album, "Southern Gravity" and "Trailer Hitch", was written with Tim Owens; Owens said that given the kind of person that Bush is, and his talent of writing positive music, he was not surprised he could write happy songs that "sound marginally like Sugarland" despite him being in a dark place. Many songs from his backlog were shelved for being too sad and outside the scope of music he wanted to release. The solo album consisted of feel-good music and lyrics; Bush himself admitted that he was unsure how that came to be given the circumstances. In an interview with The Tennessean, Bush said "I think I write wishes. If you can see it, you can probably get there. My story starts now." He had a lot of self-doubt at the time, believing that the songs weren't any good because he conceived them too easily. He collaborated with the best in his field to ensure people weren't showing positive reception simply because he was famous, including Will Jennings, Paul Overstreet, Bob DiPiero, and James Blunt.

Bush announced the solo album, Southern Gravity, in 2014, and released "Trailer Hitch" in July. "Trailer Hitch" peaked at number 21 on the U.S. Billboard Country Airplay chart and at number 25 on the U.S. Billboard US Country chart. His second single from the album, "Light Me Up" in 2015, also appeared on charts. Bush was fascinated meeting people who were both fans of Sugarland and "Trailer Hitch", but having rarely heard him sing in the former, were surprised to find that he sang the song. Southern Gravity released April 7, 2015, appearing on various charts, including but not limited to 160 on Billboard 200, 16 on Billboard's Top Country Albums, and 5 on Billboard's Heatseekers Albums. Bush referred to Southern Gravity as his "third first album". He found the album inspiring, and would listen to it to remind himself that "no matter how hard it gets, you can make things out of the pieces that are smashed." In September 2015 Bush was the subject of the television documentary Walk Tall: The Journey of Sugarland's Kristian Bush, directed and produced by Stokes Nelson. It documents Bush's life and highlights his persistence through turbulent times. It featured Kix Brooks, Canaan Smith, and Maddie & Tae, and performances from Bush.

Bush was a lead performer at the January 2016 30A Songwriters Festival in Seaside, Florida. Also among the performers at the festival was Hrya and his band, the Smokin' Novas. When Bush learned about Hyra's attendance at his final show he performed "I Won't Tell" from their album Bloom; Hyra joined him onstage and sang harmony, to the standing ovation from the audience. Bush had been given the green light for a second solo album, and Hyra was a carpenter and performed casually, so no plans for a reformation were made at the time. Bush kept the possibility of doing so open. The week after, Hyra performed harmony for a demo recording for Bush. In February 2016, Bush signed a new publishing, producing, and label deal with Broken Bow Records, to record under their imprint Wheelhouse Records. "Forever Now (Say Yes)", written and performed by Bush, became the new theme song for the TLC reality series Say Yes to the Dress when their 14th season premiered on March 4, 2016. Bush also makes a guest appearance on the show later in the season.

=== 2017–2020: Other solo ventures, Sugarland and Billy Pilgrim reformation, and Dark Water ===
After Southern Gravity, Bush worked with Lindsay Ell to produce her debut EP, Worth the Wait (EP), mentoring her on her music endeavors. Also after Southern Gravity, playwright Janece Shaffer reached out to Bush requesting that he write a song about a character for her playwright Troubadour; set in 1951, it's about the life of fictional country star Billy Mason. The song, "Father to the Son", was another song he considered a "wish" as it reflected the relationship he wanted to have with his father. Shaffer requested a second song, so Bush wrote three songs to pick from; Shaffer used all three. Ultimately, Bush would write the entire soundtrack for the musical. Troubadour first premiered at the Atlanta Alliance Theatre on January 28, 2017. The music felt deeply personal to him, with lyrics that he felt reflected his career and music reflecting that of the 1930s, which Bush drew inspiration from in his music. Bush planned not to release new music until later in 2017, but early exposure from Bobby Bones, a fan of his music, caused him to release "Sing Along". Bush explained that the song was about a past relationship that ended some time after his divorce, with lyrics that would remind them about the good times they had. Bush hoped that they have listened to the song.

At the 51st Annual Country Music Association Awards in 2017, Sugarland officially reunited following a five-year hiatus and announced that they were working on new music together. Their first full-band shows were at the C2C: Country to Country festival in March 2018. Their sixth studio album, Bigger was released on June 8, 2019.

On May 31, 2019, Bush released a new EP, Summertime Six Pack.

Bush has also co-written with actress and singer Rita Wilson on three of her albums; Rita Wilson, Bigger Picture, and Halfway to Home. He toured with her in 2019.

In 2019 Bush formed a new band with his brother Brandon, and friend Benji Shanks called Dark Water. He calls the band "an amazing experience", and he "can't wait for people to hear it."

==== 2022–2024: 52 and Billy Pilgrim ====
Throughout 2022 and 2023, Bush released four albums consisting of 52 songs to celebrate his 52nd birthday. The music consisted of unreleased works dating back to as early as 2006, which he was inspired to release after creating a YouTube channel to release old recordings of performances from Billy Pilgrim. 52 | ATL x BNA released on March 25, 2022, and consisted of music that blended country music from Nashville, Tennessee and R&B from Atlanta, Georgia. 52 | In The Key Of Summer released on June 24, 2022, featuring music that focused on the summer season. 52 | New Blue was released on September 30, 2022, and consisted of songs that reflected Bush's folk rock music of the 1990s and Billy Pilgrim. The final album of the collection, 52 | This Year, released on March 10, 2023, and consisted of music that focused on true love and a reflection of Bush's career in the music industry.

Billy Pilgrim began performing again in 2023. In 2024 they performed at the Grand Old Opry. In May 2024 the duo played 3 sold-out shows at Eddie's Attic outside Atlanta.

== Radio ==
On BBC Radio 2 Country, Bush presented 'Country Duos', selecting some of his favourite country songs. He presented coverage of the 2017 CMA Music Festival on BBC Radio 2.

== Personal life ==
Bush has a son and a daughter from his marriage, which ended in 2011.

Bush's brother Brandon is a former member of the rock group Train, and also tours with Sugarland, Billy Pilgrim and Kristian's solo project as a keyboardist.

== Awards and accolades ==
- 2025 - Nominated - ACM Award for Album of the Year, Am I Okay?
- 2012 Named Distinguished Alumnus, Avon Old Farms School
- 2011 CMA Awards Vocal Duo of the Year - Sugarland
- 2011 CMT Music Awards Duo Video of the Year - Sugarland, "Stuck Like Glue"
- 2011 ACM Awards Top Vocal Duo - Sugarland
- 2010 CMA Awards Vocal Duo of the Year - Sugarland
- 2009 CMA Awards Vocal Duo of the Year - Sugarland
- 2009 CMT Music Awards Duo Video of the Year - Sugarland, "All I Want To Do"
- 2009 ACM Awards Top Vocal Duo - Sugarland
- 2009 Grammy Awards Best Country Performance by a Duo or Group - Sugarland, "Stay"
- 2009 Grammy Awards Best Country Song - Sugarland, "Stay"
- 2008 CMA Awards Vocal Duo of the Year - Sugarland
- 2008 CMT Music Awards Duo Video of the Year - Sugarland, "Stay"
- 2008 ACM Awards Single of the Year - Sugarland, "Stay"
- 2007 CMA Awards Vocal Duo of the Year - Sugarland
- 2007 CMT Awards Duo Video of the Year - Sugarland, "Want To"
- 2006 ACM Awards Top New Duo or Vocal Group - Sugarland
- 2005 American Music Awards Favorite Breakthrough New Artist - Sugarland

== Discography ==
=== Solo releases ===
- Paint It All (2002)
- "Love or Money" [single] (2013)
- "Trailer Hitch" [single] (2014)

=== Billy Pilgrim ===
- St. Christopher's Crossing (1992)
- Words Like Numbers (1993)
- Billy Pilgrim (1994)
- Bloom (1995)
- In the Time Machine (2001)

=== Sugarland ===
- Premium Quality Tunes (2003)
- Sugar in the Raw (2003)
- Twice the Speed of Life (2004)
- Enjoy the Ride (2006)
- Love on the Inside (2008)
- Live on the Inside (2009)
- Gold and Green (2009)
- The Incredible Machine (2010)

=== Studio albums ===
List of studio albums, with selected details
Title	Album details	Peak chart positions				
Title	Album details	US	US Country	US Heat	US Indie	AUS
Southern Gravity	Release date: April 7, 2015; Label: Streamsound Records; Format: CD, music download	160	16	5	17	31
Troubadour	Release date: November 19, 2021; Format: CD, download	—	—	—	—	—
52 | ATL x BNA	Release date: March 25, 2022; Label: Big Machine; Format: download	—	—	—	—	—
52 | In the Key of Summer	Release date: June 24, 2022; Label: Big Machine; Format: download	—	—	—	—	—
52 | New Blue	Release date: September 30, 2022; Label: Big Machine; Format: download	—	—	—	—	—
52 | This Year	Release date: March 10, 2023; Label: Big Machine; Format: download	—	—	—	—	—

=== Singles ===
Year	Single	Peak chart positions				Album
Year	Single	US Country	US Country Airplay	US Bubbling	CAN Country	Album
2014	"Trailer Hitch"	25	21	9	44	Southern Gravity
2015	"Light Me Up"	—	60	—	—	Southern Gravity
2017	"Sing Along"	—	58	—	—	—N/a

=== Music videos ===
Year	Video	Director
2014	"Trailer Hitch"	Blake Judd
2015	"Light Me Up"	Abdelnour/Ogle
2017	"Sing Along"	Kyle Morgan
