= Jim Wilkes =

American lawyer (born 1950)

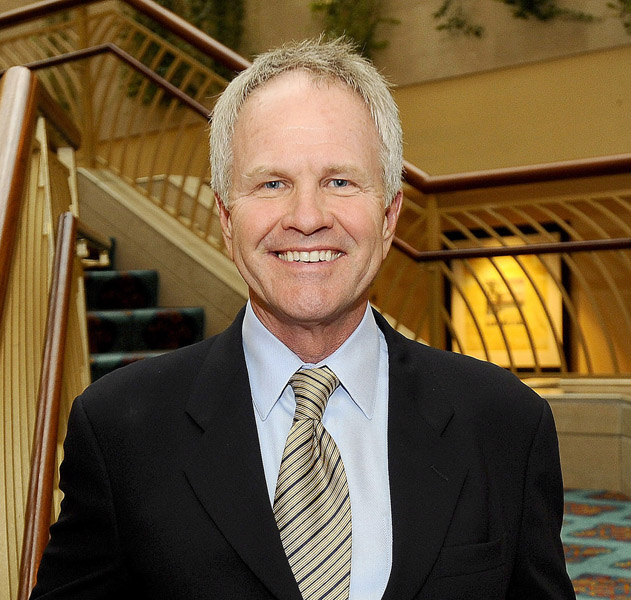
- Born: James Lewis Wilkes, II; Tampa, Florida
- Education: University of South Florida, Stetson University College of Law
- Occupation: Lawyer
- Known for: Advocacy of nursing care residents
- Website: www.yourcasematters.com

James Lewis Wilkes, II is an American lawyer. Born in Tampa, Florida, he is known for his advocacy on behalf of nursing home residents who have been victims of abuse.

== Legal career ==
Wilkes and his firm Wilkes & McHugh, P.A. gained national recognition for handling nursing home abuse and neglect lawsuits. He has been featured in People magazine, as well as on television shows such as Dateline, 48 Hours and CBS Evening News. Long-Term Living magazine wrote that Wilkes could be "described as a 'holy terror' for nursing home administrators everywhere" in an article that named him one of the top 10 most influential people in the industry.

In 2017, Wilkes represented comedian Cedric the Entertainer in a lawsuit stemming from the Aliso Canyon gas leak.

He is licensed to practice law in Alabama, Arkansas, California, Florida, Georgia, Kentucky, Mississippi, Pennsylvania, Tennessee and Texas.

=== Wilkes & Associates ===
Wilkes founded his law firm, Wilkes & McHugh, P.A. with his partner Tim McHugh in 1985. When Mr. McHugh eventually retired in 2019, the law firm was renamed to Wilkes & Associates. While initially focused on medical malpractice and injury cases Wilkes & McHugh, P.A. shifted its primary focus to representing victims of neglect in nursing homes. Since 1985 the firm has earned hundreds of millions in out-of-court settlements, and over $1.5 billion in courtroom verdicts for their clients. Under his management the firm has been recognized nationally by the National Law Journal as one of the top performing law firms.

=== Settled cases ===
In February 2012, Wilkes & Mchugh represented Joseph Webb and sued Trans Healthcare Inc. for the 3rd time in two years. Wilkes & Mchugh sued for medical neglect and abuse of the elderly. A Gainesville jury decided in favor of the plaintiff after the defendant did not provide a defense and handed down a $900 million settlement. The unrebutted testimony against Trans Healthcare inc. alleged "that the controlling interests behind these companies were hedge funds and banks that allegedly siphoned money out of nursing home operations by cutting staff, loading up on debt, letting care decline and shuffling funds between corporations to buffer them from lawsuits.”

=== Harry Reid ===
In October 2015, Jim Wilkes represented Harry Reid in a product liability lawsuit against Thera-Band maker Hygenic Intangible Property Holding Co. and related companies. The lawsuit sought $50,000 as compensation for alleged face, eye, and rib injuries that Reid claimed to suffer while using the Thera-Band product. While still in office, Wilkes provided the use of his corporate jet to Harry Reid.

== Music industry ==
Wilkes is also involved in the music industry as a performer and business manager. He launched Streamsound Records, along with long-time producer Byron Gallimore.

Red Vinyl Music was established in late 2010 when long-time producer Byron Gallimore partnered with Jim Wilkes and Tim McHugh. In January 2017, Red Vinyl Music sold the rights to 3,000 songs to Ole.

During a 2012 Florida election, Wilkes used his music industry corporations to max out political donations.

== Charity ==
Wilkes donated $100,000 to the relief efforts in Southeast Asia after the 2004 tsunami.

Jim Wilkes also serves as a personal mentor and legal advisor to two nationally-recognized sports champions. Wilkes has been an advisor and friend to former boxing super middleweight champion Jeff Lacy and junior middleweight champion Ronald Winky Wright. Wilkes was nominated for the Al Buck Manager of the Year for 2004–2005 by the Boxing Writers Association of America.

He created an advocacy group, The Coalition to Protect America's Elders, now known as Families for Better Care. The group serves as a voice for nursing home residents. The former Executive Director of Families for Better Care was elected to serve as the president of the nation's largest and oldest nursing home resident advocacy group, The National Consumer Voice for Quality Long-Term Care.
