= Streamsound Records =

American record label

- Founded: February 21, 2012
- Founder: Byron Gallimore, Jim Wilkes
- Distributor(s): RED Distribution
- Genre: Country
- Country of origin: United States
- Location: Nashville, Tennessee
- Official website: streamsound.com

Streamsound Records was an independent American record label specializing in country music artists. It was launched by Byron Gallimore (producer of Tim McGraw, Sugarland, Faith Hill) and Jim Wilkes in 2012. Streamsound Records is based in Nashville, Tennessee, and is distributed by Sony Music Nashville. Its first signing was Canadian singer/songwriter Jaida Dreyer and Austin Webb was signed in late 2012.

Jaida Dreyer's debut album, I Am Jaida Dreyer, was the first album released from the label on February 26, 2013. Streamsound closed in 2015.

== Past artists ==
- Dakota Bradley
- Kristian Bush
- Jaida Dreyer
- Austin Webb

== See also ==
- List of record labels
