= Byron Gallimore =

American record producer

- Origin: Puryear, Tennessee, U.S.
- Genres: Country
- Occupation: Record producer
- Years active: 1980–present

Byron Gallimore (born in Puryear, Tennessee) is an American record producer known for his work in the field of country music. He has worked with artists Tim McGraw, Faith Hill, Sugarland, Lee Ann Womack, and Jo Dee Messina. Hill's 1999 album Breathe won him the Grammy Award for Best Country Album. Gallimore also produced the single "Breathe" from the album.

== Biography ==
Gallimore was born in Puryear, Tennessee. He earned an engineering degree from Murray State University. He played in rock 'n' roll and country cover bands from the age of 11 and that led him to songwriting and recording.

In 1980, he won the Music City Song Festival songwriting contest with the single "No Ordinary Woman", which was released that year on the Little Giant record label, peaking at No. 93 on the Billboard country singles charts. He moved to Nashville in 1986.

Gallimore has produced 12 of Tim McGraw's albums, 11 of which debuted at No. 1 on the Billboard charts. He has produced more than 50 No. 1 Country Radio singles.

He won a Grammy Award for Best Country Album in 2001 for Faith Hill's album Breathe and produced the single "Breathe" from the album. He also produced the song "Stay" which won a Best Country Performance by a Duo or Group with Vocals Grammy for Sugarland in 2008. Billboard named him Producer of the Year in 2000, 2001 and 2002.

In addition to Tim McGraw, Faith Hill, and Sugarland, Gallimore has produced Lee Ann Womack, Halfway to Hazard, Brooks & Dunn, Martina McBride, Jo Dee Messina, Jessica Andrews, Randy Travis, Phil Vassar, Terri Clark, and American Idol runner-up Lauren Alaina.

Gallimore launched a record label in 2012 called Streamsound Records with Jim Wilkes. The roster includes Jaida Dreyer, who released her debut album I Am Jaida Dreyer in early 2013, Austin Webb and Dakota Bradley. Streamsound Records is based in Nashville, Tennessee.

== Awards and nominations ==
Year	Association	Artist	Work	Category	Result
1994	Academy of Country Music Awards	Tim McGraw	Not A Moment Too Soon	Album of the Year - Producer	Won
1994	Academy of Country Music Awards	Tim McGraw	Don't Take The Girl	Single Record of the Year - Producer	Nominated
1994	Country Music Association Awards	Tim McGraw	Don't Take The Girl	Single of the Year - Producer	Nominated
1995	Academy of Country Music Awards	Tim McGraw	All I Want	Album of the Year - Producer	Nominated
1995	Academy of Country Music Awards	Tim McGraw	I Like It, I Love It	Single Record of the Year - Producer	Nominated
1997	Academy of Country Music Awards	Tim McGraw	Everywhere	Album of the Year - Producer	Nominated
1997	Academy of Country Music Awards	Tim McGraw & Faith Hill	It's Your Love	Single Record of the Year - Producer	Won
1997	Country Music Association Awards	Tim McGraw & Faith Hill	It's Your Love	Single of the Year - Producer	Nominated
1998	Academy of Country Music Awards	Faith Hill	Faith	Album of the Year - Producer	Nominated
1998	Academy of Country Music Awards	Jo Dee Messina	I'm Alright	Album of the Year - Producer	Nominated
1998	Academy of Country Music Awards	Faith Hill	This Kiss	Single Record of the Year - Producer	Won
1998	Country Music Association Awards	Tim McGraw	Everywhere	Album of the Year - Producer	Won
1995	Country Music Association Awards	Faith Hill	This Kiss	Single Record of the Year - Producer	Nominated
1998	Grammy Award	Faith Hill	Faith	Best Country Album - Producer	Nominated
1999	Academy of Country Music Awards	Tim McGraw	A Place In The Sun	Album of the Year - Producer	Nominated
1999	Academy of Country Music Awards	Faith Hill	Breathe	Album of the Year - Producer	Nominated
1999	Academy of Country Music Awards	Tim McGraw	Please Remember Me	Single Record of the Year - Producer	Nominated
1999	Country Music Association Awards	Tim McGraw	A Place In The Sun	Album of the Year - Producer	Won
1999	Country Music Association Awards	Tim McGraw	Please Remember Me	Single Record of the Year - Producer	Nominated
1999	Music Row Magazine Awards			Producer of the Year	Won
2000	Academy of Country Music Awards	Tim McGraw & Faith Hill	Let's Make Love	Vocal Event of the Year - Producer	Nominated
2000	Country Music Association Awards	Faith Hill	Breathe	Album of the Year - Producer	Nominated
2000	Country Music Association Awards	Faith Hill	Breathe	Single Record of the Year - Producer	Nominated
2000	Grammy Award	Faith Hill	Breathe	Best Country Album - Producer	Won
2000	Billboard Music Awards			Hot Country Producer of the Year	Won
2000	Music Row Magazine Awards			Producer of the Year	Won
2001	Academy of Country Music Awards	Tim McGraw	Set This Circus Down	Album of the Year - Producer	Nominated
2001	Country Music Association Awards	Tim McGraw	Set This Circus Down	Album of the Year - Producer	Nominated
2001	Billboard Music Awards			Hot Producer of the Year	Won
2002	Billboard Awards			Hot Producer of the Year	Won
2003	Academy of Country Music Awards	Phil Vassar	Working For A Living	Vocal Event of the Year - Producer	Nominated
2003	Country Music Association Awards	Tim McGraw	Tim McGraw & The Dancehall Doctors	Album of the Year - Producer	Nominated
2004	Academy of Country Music Awards	Tim McGraw	Live Like You Were Dying	Album of the Year - Producer	Nominated
2004	Academy of Country Music Awards			Producer of the Year	Nominated
2004	Academy of Country Music Awards	Lee Ann Womack	I May Hate Myself In The Morning	Single Record of the Year - Producer	Nominated
2004	Academy of Country Music Awards	Tim McGraw	Live Like You Were Dying	Single of the Year - Producer	Won
2004	Country Music Association Awards	Tim McGraw	Live Like You Were Dying	Single of the Year - Producer	Won
2005	Grammy Award	Tim McGraw	Live Like You Were Dying	Best Country Album - Producer	Nominated
2005	Academy of Country Music Awards	Lee Ann Womack	There's More Where That Came From	Album of the Year - Producer	Nominated
2005	Academy of Country Music Awards			Producer of the Year	Nominated
2005	Country Music Association Awards	Lee Ann Womack	There's More Where That Came From	Album of the Year - Producer	Won
2005	Country Music Association Awards	Tim McGraw	Live Like You Were Dying	Album of the Year - Producer	Nominated
2005	Country Music Association Awards	Lee Ann Womack	I May Hate Myself In The Morning	Single of the Year - Producer	Won
2007	Academy of Country Music Awards			Producer of the Year	Nominated
2007	Academy of Country Music Awards	Sugarland	Stay	Single Record of the Year - Producer	Won
2007	Academy of Country Music Awards	Sugarland	Stay	Video of the Year - Producer	Nominated
2007	Music Row Magazine Awards			Producer of the Year	Won
2008	Grammy Award	Tim McGraw	Let It Go	Best Country Album - Producer	Nominated
2008	Country Music Association Awards	Sugarland	Stay	Single of the Year - Producer	Nominated
2009	Academy of Country Music Awards	Sugarland	Love On The Inside	Album of the Year - Producer	Nominated
2014	Grammy Award	Tim McGraw	Two Lanes of Freedom	Best Country Album - Producer	Nominated
2014	Country Music Association Awards	Tim McGraw	Meanwhile Back at Mama's	Single of the Year - Producer	Nominated
