= A Holly Dolly Christmas =

Studio album by Dolly Parton
- Released: October 2, 2020
- Recorded: 2009; 2016–2020
- Studios: Sound Stage Studios (Nashville); Kent Wells Productions (Franklin); Dark Horse Recording (Franklin); Paragon Studios (Franklin); The Jazz/Pop Sweatshop (Vancouver); Adventure Studios (Nashville); Velvet Apple Studios (Nashville); Little Big Sound (Nashville); Monk Music Studios (East Hampton); Quad Studios (Nashville); Pedernales Recording (Spicewood)
- Genres: Christmas; country
- Length: 43:53
- Labels: Butterfly; 12-Tone Music Group
- Producer: Kent Wells

Dolly Parton chronology
Dumplin' (2018)	A Holly Dolly Christmas (2020)	Run, Rose, Run (2022)

Parton's Christmas chronology
Home for Christmas (1990)	A Holly Dolly Christmas (2020)

Singles from A Holly Dolly Christmas
- 1. "Mary, Did You Know?" Released: August 21, 2020; 2. "I Saw Mommy Kissing Santa Claus" Released: September 15, 2020; 3. "Christmas on the Square" Released: September 29, 2020; 4. "Cuddle Up, Cozy Down Christmas" Released: October 2, 2020; 5. "I Still Believe" Released: December 4, 2020

Alternative cover
- 2022 Ultimate Deluxe Edition cover

Singles from A Holly Dolly Christmas (Ultimate Deluxe Edition)
- 1. "A Smoky Mountain Christmas" Released: August 26, 2022; 2. "Silent Night" Released: September 23, 2022

A Holly Dolly Christmas is the forty-seventh solo studio album by American singer-songwriter Dolly Parton. It was released on October 2, 2020, by Parton's Butterfly Records in partnership with 12-Tone Music Group. The album was produced by Kent Wells, with Parton serving as executive producer. It is Parton's third Christmas album, following 1984's Once Upon a Christmas with Kenny Rogers and 1990's Home for Christmas.

The album features guest appearances by Michael Bublé, Billy Ray Cyrus, Miley Cyrus, Jimmy Fallon, Willie Nelson, and Parton's brother Randy. It peaked at number one on the Billboard Top Country Albums chart, becoming Parton's eighth album to top the chart. The album also peaked at number one on the Billboard Top Holiday Albums chart and number 16 on the Billboard 200. The album was nominated for Best Traditional Pop Vocal Album at the 64th Annual Grammy Awards.

== Background ==
Parton released "Comin' Home for Christmas" as a single in December 2009, but no mention of a Christmas album was made for almost seven years. Parton first mentioned that she was working on a new Christmas album during a Facebook Live Q&A in August 2016. She said that the album would be released in 2017 and would feature songs that she had written for the NBC TV movie Christmas of Many Colors: Circle of Love. The title song from the movie, "Circle of Love", was recorded by Jennifer Nettles, who played Parton's mother in the film, for her 2016 Christmas album, To Celebrate Christmas. The song was also recorded by Parton's niece Heidi Parton for her 2017 album, This Kind of Love. The album's release was delayed due to the release of Parton's first children's album, I Believe in You, in 2017 and the Dumplin' soundtrack album in 2018. The album's release was mentioned again in April 2020 by Parton's creative director Steve Summers, who mentioned in a YouTube livestream with Linda Perry that his team was working on preparations for the album photoshoot and that it would be coming out in 2020. Parton prematurely announced the album's title in addition to two song titles and a few of the guest artists during an interview with Eddie Stubbs on WSM in July 2020. Following the broadcast, the interview was posted to WSM's SoundCloud page, but was deleted by mid-afternoon the next day.

== Release and promotion ==
The album was formally announced on August 12, 2020, and was made available for pre-order the following day. It was released October 2 on CD, digital download, and streaming. Target stores offered an exclusive version of the album featuring an alternate cover. An enhanced version of the album was made available for streaming on Spotify featuring exclusive video content. An Amazon Exclusive edition of the album featuring two bonus tracks was made available for streaming on October 6. The album was released November 13 on LP after its release was pushed back from October 2 due to a manufacturing delay. The LP version was released on opaque red, green, and gold vinyl on Parton's website. The LP was released on white vinyl exclusively on Amazon in the UK and peppermint colored vinyl by Magnolia Record Club. It was also released on cassette and 8-track on November 13, each featuring one bonus track, available exclusively through Amazon. A "Bonus Version" of the album was released for digital download and streaming on December 4 with one bonus track, a live recording of "I Still Believe", from the CBS TV special A Holly Dolly Christmas.

On August 26, 2022, Parton announced that the Ultimate Deluxe Edition of the album, updated to include an additional "eight tracks, including rarities making their CD, vinyl, and digital debuts", would be released on October 14, 2022.

=== Singles ===
"Comin Home for Christmas" was released as a stand-alone single on December 1, 2009. It would be included on A Holly Dolly Christmas eleven years after its initial release and peaked at number 31 on the Billboard Holiday Digital Song Sales chart.

The album's first single, "Mary, Did You Know?", was previewed in an article on Good Housekeeping's website on August 20 and was released to digital retailers the following day. It peaked at number 49 on the Billboard Hot Christian Songs chart and number 18 on the Billboard Christian Digital Song Sales chart.

"I Saw Mommy Kissing Santa Claus" was released as the second single on September 15.

The third single, "Christmas on the Square", was released on September 29 and peaked at number 49 on the Billboard Holiday Digital Song Sales chart.

"Cuddle Up, Cozy Down Christmas" was released as the fourth single on October 2 and peaked at number three on the Billboard Holiday Digital Song Sales chart, number 10 on the Billboard Adult Contemporary chart, number 6 on the Billboard Canada AC chart, and number 80 on the UK Singles Chart. An animated music video premiered November 6 on Parton's Facebook page and was released on YouTube the following day.

Parton surprise released "I Still Believe" from her CBS Christmas special as a digital bonus track and the album's fifth and final single on December 4. It peaked at number 22 on the Billboard Country Digital Song Sales chart and number 32 on the Billboard Holiday Digital Song Sales chart.

"A Smoky Mountain Christmas", from Parton's 1986 television movie of the same name, was released August 26, 2022, as the first single from the album's Ultimate Deluxe Edition . The second single, Parton's recording of "Silent Night" from the 1997 soundtrack album Annabelle's Wish, was released on September 23, 2022.

==== Other charted songs ====
Following the album's release several of its tracks charted on the Billboard Holiday Digital Song Sales chart. "All I Want for Christmas Is You" peaked at number four, "Circle of Love" peaked at number eight, "Pretty Paper" peaked at number 12, "Christmas Is" peaked at number 13, "Holly Jolly Christmas" peaked at number 16, "You Are My Christmas" peaked at number 21, and "Christmas Where We Are" peaked at number 34.

Animated music videos were released for "All I Want for Christmas Is You" and "Pretty Paper" on December 3 and December 22, respectively.

=== Television appearances ===
Parton performed "Circle of Love", "Comin' Home for Christmas", and "Mary, Did You Know?" during livestream event on Amazon Music titled Dolly Parton's Comin' Home for Christmas on November 13, followed by a Q&A hosted by Leslie Jordan.

Parton performed "Holly Jolly Christmas" from her studio in Nashville during a pre-recorded segment of the Macy's Thanksgiving Day Parade on November 26.

Parton and Jimmy Fallon performed "All I Want for Christmas Is You" in addition to Parton also performing "Mary, Did You Know?" during NBC's annual Christmas in Rockefeller Center tree-lighting ceremony on December 2. Both performances were pre-recorded at Parton's studio in Nashville with Fallon's portion being filmed in New York City on set of The Tonight Show.

On December 4 Parton appeared on The Graham Norton Show where she performed "I Saw Mommy Kissing Santa Claus" via a pre-recorded performance from her studio in Nashville. Also on December 4, Parton hosted a livestream concert on Pandora with guests Brett Eldredge, Carly Pearce, and Tasha Cobbs Leonard. Parton performed "I Saw Mommy Kissing Santa Claus" and "Holly Jolly Christmas".

During the Toronto Santa Claus Parade on December 5, Parton performed "Holy Jolly Christmas" from her studio in Nashville during a pre-recorded segment.

CBS aired a television special titled A Holly Dolly Christmas starring Parton on December 6. Parton performed from an intimate, candlelit set while sharing personal Christmas stories and faith-based recollections of the season, interspersed with songs from the album. The special drew 6.2 million viewers and a 0.7 average rating among adults 18–49.

A pre-recorded video of Parton performing "Christmas Is" from her home aired during Cyndi Lauper's tenth annual Home for the Holidays fundraiser livestream on December 11 on TikTok and December 13 on YouTube.

== Critical reception ==
Professional ratings
Review scores
Source	Rating
AllMusic	3.5/5 stars
Consequence of Sound	B

A Holly Dolly Christmas received positive reviews from music critics. At Album of the Year, which assigns a normalized rating out of 100 to reviews from mainstream publications, the album received an average score of 76 based on 4 reviews. In a review for AllMusic, Timothy Monger gave the album four out of five stars, saying that the album "offers up a heartfelt, compassionate, and joyous cup of holiday cheer." He noted that unlike 1990's Home for Christmas, this album features Parton originals, "some of which are quite good." Matt Melis gave the album a B rating in a review for Consequence of Sound, saying "it feels like the kind of gift we could all stand to find under the tree." He named "Christmas Is", "Christmas on the Square", and "Pretty Paper" as the album's essential tracks.

== Commercial performance ==
The album debuted and peaked at number 16 on the Billboard 200 chart with 27,000 equivalent album units of which 26,000 were pure album sales. It re-peaked at number 16 during its initial chart run. The album also debuted and peaked at number one on both the Billboard Top Country Albums chart and the Billboard Top Holiday Albums chart. In Europe the album peaked at number 11 on the Scottish Albums chart and number 16 on the UK Albums Chart.

As of December 2020, the album has sold 171,000 units in the United States, Parton's best since Backwoods Barbie.

== Accolades ==
A Holly Dolly Christmas was nominated for Best Traditional Pop Vocal Album at the 64th Annual Grammy Awards.

== Track listing ==
A Holly Dolly Christmas track listing
No.	Title	Writer(s)	Length
1.	"Holly Jolly Christmas"	Johnny Marks	3:21
2.	"Christmas Is" (featuring Miley Cyrus)	Dolly Parton	3:17
3.	"Cuddle Up, Cozy Down Christmas" (with Michael Bublé)	Parton	3:39
4.	"Christmas on the Square"	Parton	3:15
5.	"Circle of Love"	Parton	3:42
6.	"All I Want for Christmas Is You" (with Jimmy Fallon)	Mariah Carey; Walter Afanasieff	4:04
7.	"Comin' Home for Christmas"	Parton; Kent Wells	4:28
8.	"Christmas Where We Are" (featuring Billy Ray Cyrus)	Jada Roberts; Barry Jobe	3:10
9.	"Pretty Paper" (with Willie Nelson)	Willie Nelson	3:33
10.	"I Saw Mommy Kissing Santa Claus"	Tommie Connor	2:44
11.	"You Are My Christmas" (featuring Randy Parton)	Parton	4:14
12.	"Mary, Did You Know?"	Mark Lowry; Buddy Greene	4:26
Total length:			43:53

8-track edition bonus track
No.	Title	Writer(s)	Length
13.	"The Wish Book"	Parton	1:32
Total length:			47:25

Cassette edition bonus track
No.	Title	Writer(s)	Length
13.	"Three Candles"	Parton	2:29
Total length:			48:22

Amazon Exclusive edition bonus tracks (streaming only)
No.	Title	Writer(s)	Length
13.	"The Wish Book"	Parton	1:32
14.	"Three Candles"	Parton	2:29
Total length:			49:54

Bonus Version bonus track
No.	Title	Writer(s)	Length
13.	"I Still Believe" (Performed live on A Holly Dolly Christmas TV Special)	Parton, Wells	3:50
Total length:			47:43

2021 Deluxe Edition bonus tracks
No.	Title	Writer(s)	Length
13.	"I Still Believe" (Performed live on A Holly Dolly Christmas TV Special)	Parton, Wells	3:50
14.	"Three Candles"	Parton	2:29
15.	"The Wish Book"	Parton	1:32
Total length:			53:44

2022 Ultimate Deluxe Edition bonus tracks
No.	Title	Writer(s)	Length
13.	"Three Candles"	Parton	2:29
14.	"The Wish Book"	Parton	1:32
15.	"Baby, It's Cold Outside" (duet with Rod Stewart)	Frank Loesser	3:50
16.	"Something Bigger Than Me"	Steve Dorff; Marty Panzer	3:56
17.	"A Smoky Mountain Christmas"	Parton	2:10
18.	"(I'd Like to Spend) Christmas with Santa"	Parton; Bill Owens	2:13
19.	"Wrapped Up in You"	Parton	2:33
20.	"Silent Night"	Franz Xaver Gruber; Joseph Mohr	3:13

== Personnel ==
Adapted from the album liner notes.

Performance

- Roy Agee – tenor trombone, bass trombone, orchestration
- David Angell – violin
- Monisa Angell – viola
- Michael Bublé – featured artist
- Wei Tsun Chang – violin
- Dennis Crouch – upright bass
- Billy Ray Cyrus – featured artist
- Miley Cyrus – featured artist
- Janet Darnell – violin
- David Davidson – violin, viola, orchestration
- Michael Davis – keys, B3, orchestration, percussion
- Richard Dennison – background vocals, piano
- Jimmy Fallon – featured artist
- Chris Farrell – viola
- Lloyd Green – steel guitar
- Vicki Hampton – background vocals
- Tom Hoey – drums, percussion
- Paul Hollowell – piano, B3
- Sam Levine – saxophone, flute, clarinet, orchestration
- Gary Lunn – bass, upright bass
- Steve Mackey – bass
- Aaron McCune –background vocals
- Jimmy Mattingly – fiddle, mandolin
- Paul Nelson – cello
- Willie Nelson – featured artist, acoustic guitar
- Jennifer O'Brien – background vocals
- Dolly Parton – lead vocals
- Heidi Parton – harmony vocals
- Randy Parton – featured artist
- Stefan Petreseu – violin
- Carole Rabinowitz – cello
- Sarighani Reist – cello
- Tom Rutledge – acoustic guitar
- Steve Turner – drums, percussion
- Mary Kathryn Vanosdale – violin
- Darrin Vincent – background vocals
- Rhonda Vincent – background vocals, mandolin
- Kent Wells – electric guitar, nylon string guitar, guitars, percussion, banjo, acoustic guitar, programming
- Karen Winkelmann – violin

Production

- Lakieta Bagwell-Garves – background vocal arrangement
- Michael Bublé – vocal arrangement
- Steve Chadie – engineer
- Joey Crawford – engineer
- Cynthia Daniels – engineer
- David Davidson – orchestral arrangement
- Richard Dennison – vocal arrangements, producer
- Kyle Dickinson – editing
- Kat Elfman – production assistant
- Ryan Enockson – engineer
- Jamie Graves – vocal recording
- Paul David Hager – Miley vocal engineer
- Chris Latham – editing, vocal editing
- Kam Luchterhand – assistant engineer
- Parker Lyons – assistant engineer
- Andrew Mayer – assistant engineer
- Joel McKenney – assistant engineer
- Patrick Murphy – tracking engineer, engineer
- Dolly Parton – executive producer
- Taylor Pollert – orchestra engineer
- Tom Rutledge – producer, engineer
- Cody Simpson – Miley vocal tracking engineer
- Tyler Spratt – editing
- Adam Wathan – assistant engineer
- Kent Wells – producer, overdubs
- Kevin Willis – engineer, editing, tracking engineer

Other personnel

- Hillary Adcock – seamstress
- Stacie Huckeba – photographer
- Tisha Lemming – master draper
- Vance Nichols – set design
- Kiley Reed – seamstress
- Cheryl Riddle – hair
- J.B. Rowland – art direction
- Rebecca Seaver – productions
- Steve Summers – costumer designer

== Charts ==
=== Weekly charts ===
Chart performance for A Holly Dolly Christmas
Chart (2020)	Peak position
Australian Albums (ARIA)	37
Belgian Albums (Ultratop Flanders)	174
Canadian Albums (Billboard)	14
Dutch Albums (Album Top 100)	35
Irish Albums (Official Charts)	13
Irish Independent Albums (IRMA)	1
New Zealand Albums (RMNZ)	13
Scottish Albums (Official Charts)	11
Swedish Albums (Sverigetopplistan)	41
UK Albums (Official Charts)	16
UK Independent Albums (Official Charts)	4
US Billboard 200	16
US Independent Albums (Billboard)	2
US Top Country Albums (Billboard)	1
US Top Holiday Albums (Billboard)	1

=== Year-end charts ===
2020 year-end chart performance for A Holly Dolly Christmas
Chart (2020)	Position
US Top Album Sales (Billboard)	95
US Top Country Albums (Billboard)	68

2021 year-end chart performance for A Holly Dolly Christmas
Chart (2021)	Position
US Top Album Sales (Billboard)	31
US Top Country Albums (Billboard)	45

2022 year-end chart performance for A Holly Dolly Christmas
Chart (2022)	Position
US Top Album Sales (Billboard)	99

== Certifications ==
Certifications for A Holly Dolly Christmas
Region	Certification	Certified units/sales
United Kingdom (BPI)	Silver	60,000^{‡}
United States (RIAA)	Gold	500,000^{‡}
^{‡} Sales+streaming figures based on certification alone.

== Release history ==
Release history for A Holly Dolly Christmas
Country	Date	Format	Label
Various	October 2, 2020	CD; digital download; streaming	Butterfly; 12Tone Music Group
Various	October 6, 2020	Steaming (Amazon Exclusive edition)	Butterfly; 12Tone Music Group
Various	November 13, 2020	LP; 8-track; cassette	Butterfly; 12Tone Music Group
Various	December 4, 2020	Digital download; streaming (Bonus Version)	Butterfly; 12Tone Music Group
Various	October 29, 2021	Digital download; streaming (Deluxe Edition)	Butterfly; Warner
Various	October 14, 2022	CD; LP; Digital download; streaming (Ultimate Deluxe Edition)	Butterfly; Warner
