= I Can Do Hard Things =

EP by Jennifer Nettles
- Released: June 7, 2019
- Genre: Country
- Length: 24:57
- Label: Big Machine
- Producer: Jennifer Nettles; Julian Raymond

Jennifer Nettles chronology
To Celebrate Christmas (2016)	I Can Do Hard Things (2019)	Always Like New (2021)

Singles from I Can Do Hard Things
- 1. "I Can Do Hard Things" Released: February 22, 2019

I Can Do Hard Things is the first EP by American singer-songwriter Jennifer Nettles. It was released on June 7, 2019, by Big Machine Records. The first single from the EP, "I Can Do Hard Things", was released on February 22, 2019.

== Track listing ==
All tracks are written by Jennifer Nettles, with additional co-writing on "Take It Off" by Emily King.

No.	Title	Length
1.	"I Can Do Hard Things"	3:45
2.	"Just My Record Player"	3:03
3.	"Take It Off"	4:08
4.	"King of the City"	4:19
5.	"A Beautiful Life"	5:16
6.	"I Can Do Hard Things" (full-length version)	4:26
Total length:		24:57

== Personnel ==
- Jennifer Nettles – vocals
