= Still the Same =

Still the Same may refer to:

- "Still the Same" (Bob Seger song), 1978
- "Still the Same" (Slade song), 1987
- "Still the Same" (Sugarland song), 2017
- Still the Same... Great Rock Classics of Our Time, a 2006 album by Rod Stewart
