= Babe (Sugarland song) =

2018 single by Sugarland featuring Taylor Swift

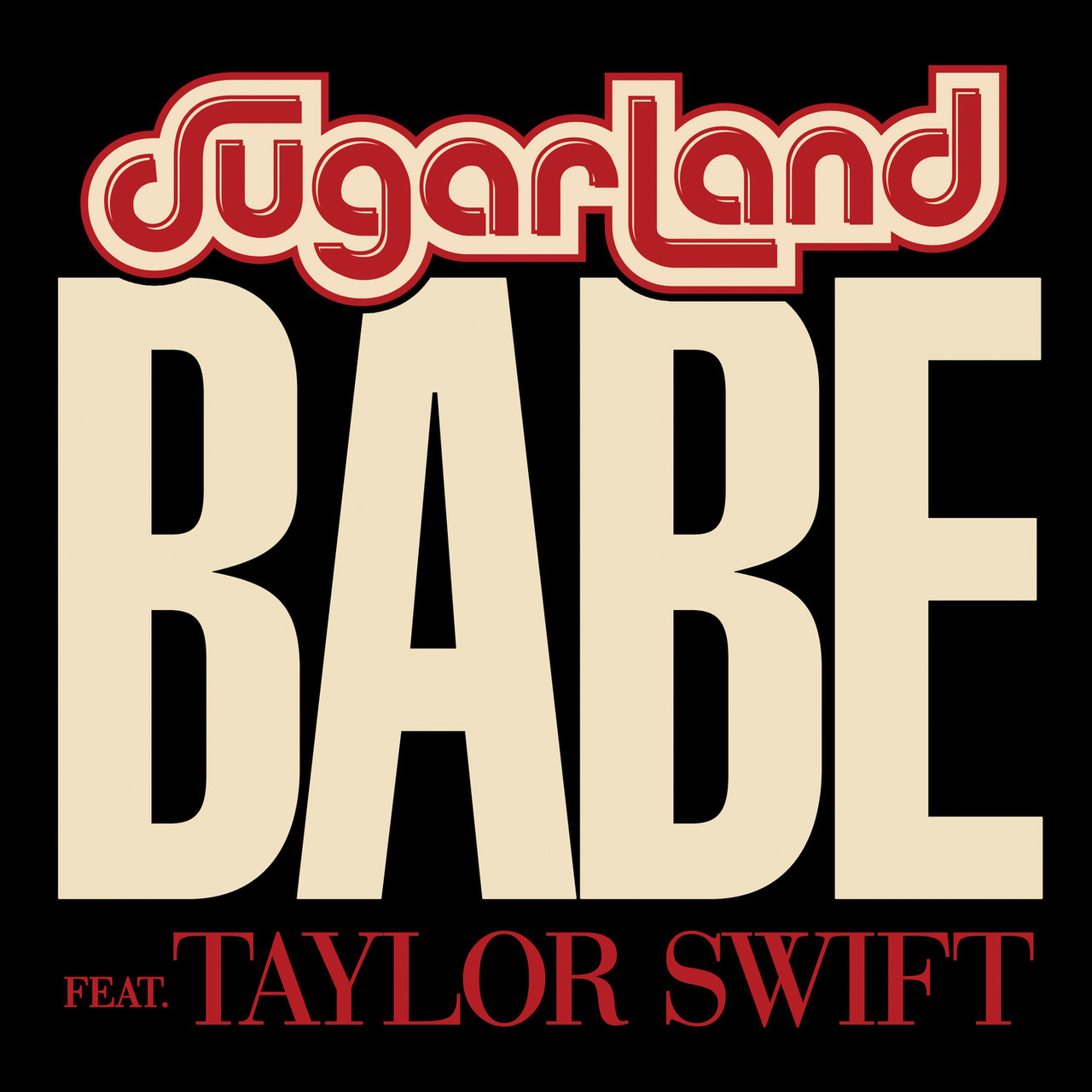

Single by Sugarland featuring Taylor Swift

from the album Bigger
- Released: April 20, 2018
- Genre: Country pop; folk rock
- Length: 3:35
- Label: Big Machine
- Songwriters: Taylor Swift; Pat Monahan
- Producers: Kristian Bush; Jennifer Nettles; Julian Raymond

Sugarland singles chronology
"Still the Same" (2017)	"Babe" (2018)

Taylor Swift singles chronology
"Delicate" (2018)	"Babe" (2018)	"Getaway Car" (2018)

Music video
- "Babe" on YouTube

"Babe" is a song by the American country music duo Sugarland featuring the American singer-songwriter Taylor Swift. It was released by Big Machine Records on April 20, 2018, as the second single from Sugarland's sixth studio album, Bigger (2018). Written by Swift and Pat Monahan, "Babe" was intended for Swift's 2012 studio album Red but it did not make the final track list.

The track was produced by Sugarland's Kristian Bush and Jennifer Nettles, and Julian Raymond. It is a midtempo country pop and folk rock breakup ballad, with lyrics addressing an unfaithful lover. In the US, the single peaked at number 8 on Hot Country Songs, number 17 on Country Airplay, and number 72 on the Billboard Hot 100.

After a 2019 dispute over the ownership of Swift's back catalog, she re-recorded a solo version of the song as "Babe (Taylor's Version) (From the Vault)" for her second re-recorded album, Red (Taylor's Version) (2021). Produced by Swift and Jack Antonoff, the re-recorded track features elements of ska and new instruments like trumpet, saxophone, and flute.

== Background and release ==
Taylor Swift wrote "Babe" with Pat Monahan intending to include it on her 2012 studio album Red. Scott Borchetta, CEO of Big Machine Records where Swift was signed at the time, confirmed her collaboration with Monahan in September 2012 at the iHeartRadio Music Festival. According to Monahan, he first reached out to Swift asking for a collaboration on a song for his band Train's album, and Swift in turn asked him to collaborate on a track for Red. "Babe" was ultimately left off Red's final track listing and was not recorded.

Swift pitched "Babe" to Sugarland in 2018 upon learning that the duo reunited. Talking to reporters backstage at the 53rd Academy of Country Music Awards, Sugarland's Kristian Bush said that he felt "a little anxious" upon hearing from Swift because he "didn't want to mess it up". It was the first time the duo recorded a song written by another artist for their album: "We didn't tell anybody about it until we got finished and she liked it, thank God." Swift posted onto Instagram expressing her gratitude for Sugarland for giving the track "its own life" and that they "[had] done such a great job with it".

"Babe" is the only track on Sugarland's album Bigger (2018) that is not written by the duo's Bush and Jennifer Nettles. Nettles commented that until "Babe", "We've never put someone else's song on a Sugarland record." It also marked the second song Swift wrote for a country music act since abandoning the genre in 2014, following Little Big Town's "Better Man" (2016). "Babe" was released for download and streaming, and to country radio by Big Machine Records on April 20, 2018.

== Composition and reception ==
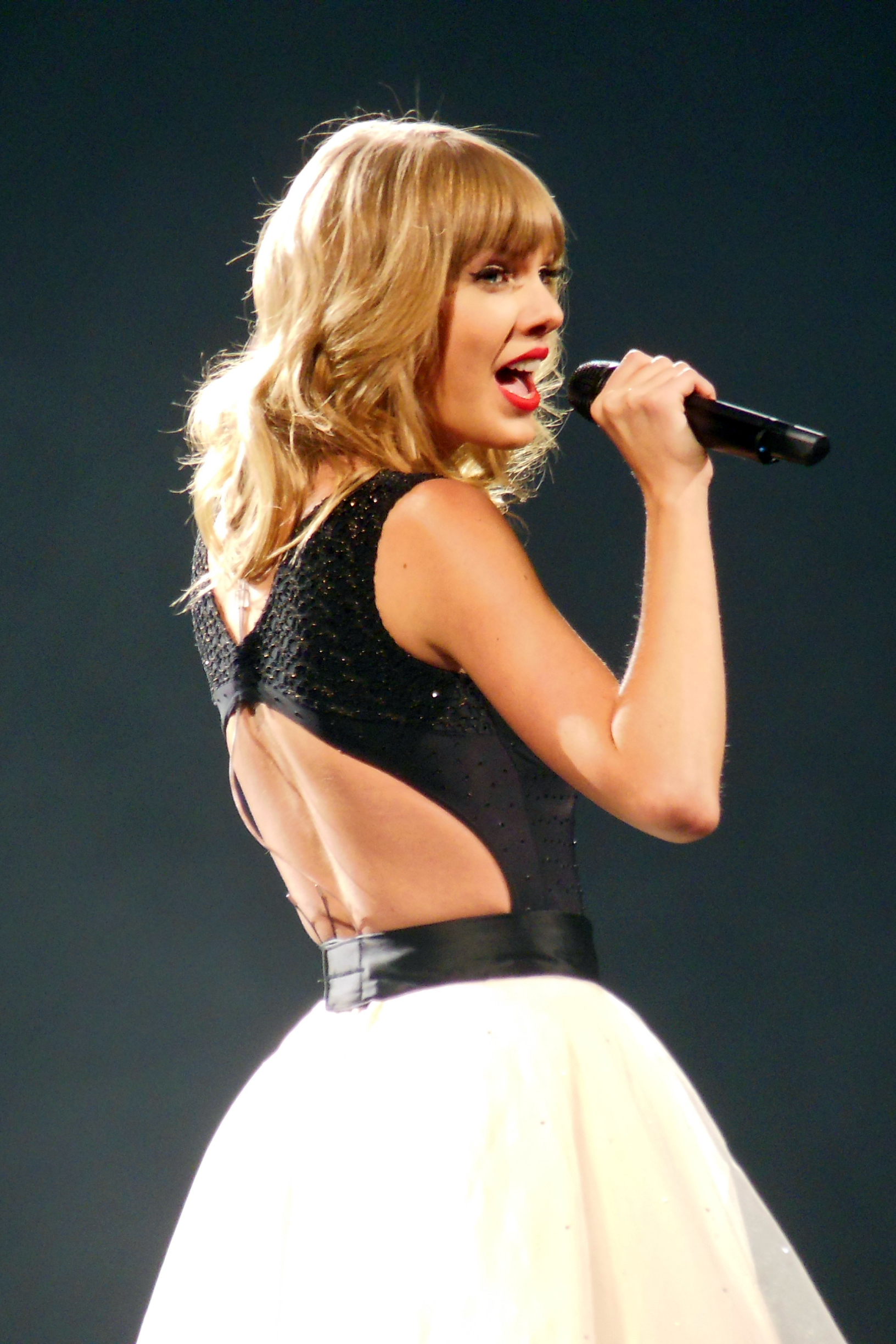
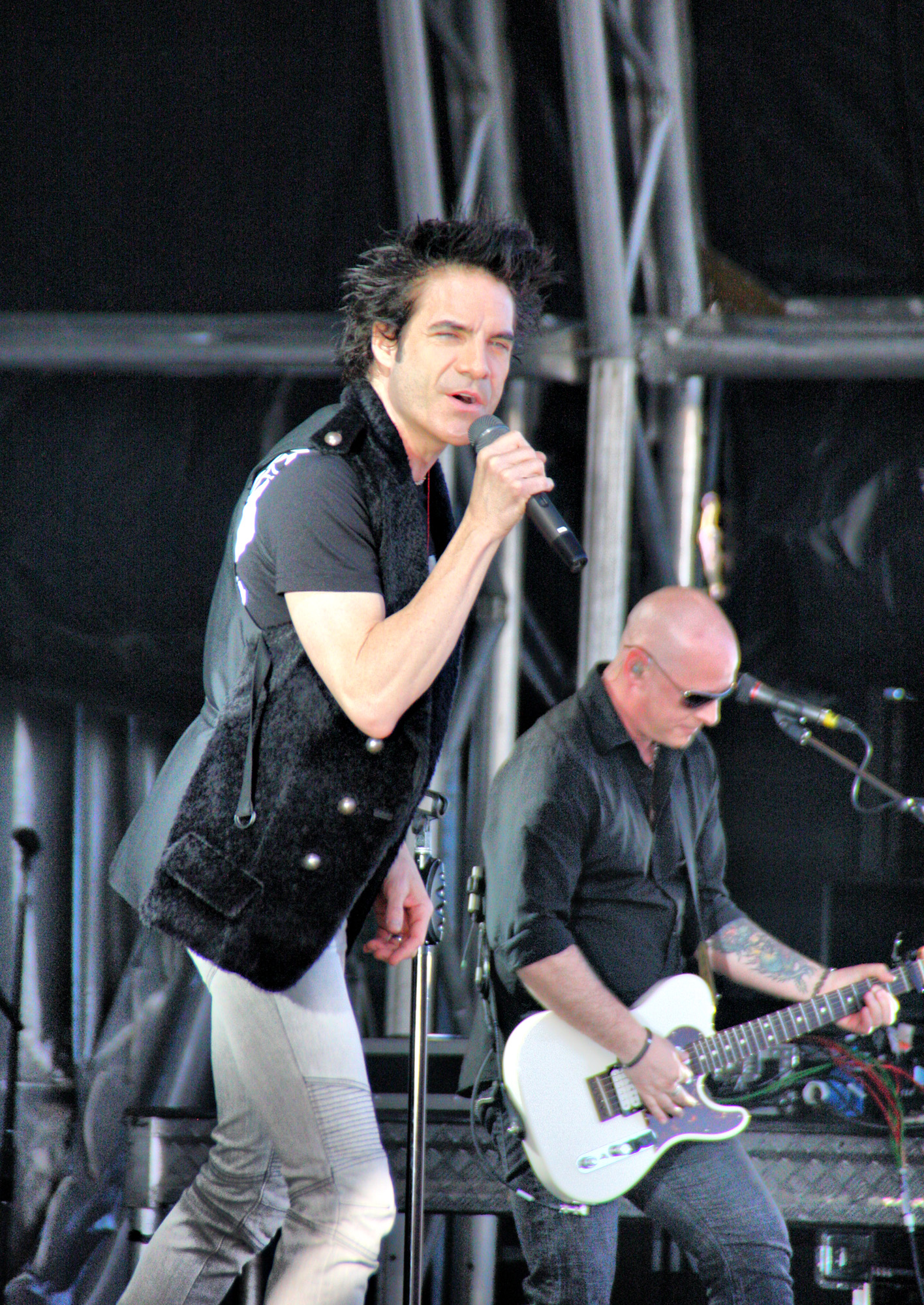
Taylor Swift (left) wrote "Babe" with Pat Monahan (right) for her 2012 album Red but it did not make the final cut.

"Babe" is a midtempo, acoustic breakup ballad. Glamour described it as a country tune, Billboard categorized it as country pop, while Variety said that it is "not straight-up country" but also a "return" to the "pre-1989 pop style" of Swift's music. Rolling Stone's Brittney McKenna characterized it as a "foot-stomping" tune that resembles the styles of Swift's 2010 album Speak Now. Jon Caramanica of The New York Times regarded the genre as "arena folk-rock". Nettles sings lead vocals, and Swift contributes to the song's backing vocals, which can be heard echoing in the chorus and the bridge. The lyrics address heartbreak; the narrator is devastated upon discovering her lover's infidelity: "And it's strange how your face doesn't look so innocent/ Your secret has its consequence and that's on you, babe."

Spin's Israel Daramola considered "Babe" a lovely and passionate breakup song, deeming it a "surprisingly feel-good" track given its theme of moving on from heartbreak. Jewly Hight of NPR complimented the track as a "breezy pop kiss-off" that sums up "female dissatisfaction". Rob Sheffield of Rolling Stone described her background vocals as "lethal", while Billboard's Taylor Weatherby and Danielle Pascual praised the "addictive hook and [...] heart-clenching bridge". In a less positive review, Caramanica thought that Nettles on the track sounds "constricted, hemmed into another vocalist's box", losing her signature vocal styles. He further complained that the production did not showcase Sugarland's usual "rootsy jubilation" was replaced by an "anodyne" sound.

In the US, "Babe" peaked at number 72 on the Billboard Hot 100, number 17 on Country Airplay, and number 8 on Hot Country Songs. It had sold 166,000 copies in the US as of November 2018 and has been certified gold by the Recording Industry Association of America. The song peaked at number 94 in Canada and number 64 in Scotland.

== Music video ==
The trailer for the music video aired during the 2018 CMT Music Awards and was uploaded to Sugarland's YouTube channel on June 6, 2018, while the official music video premiered on June 9. Swift had the original idea for the video's concept, and as stated per the Sugarland duo themselves, they all got together before the video shoot to collaborate on ideas.

The video, directed by Anthony Mandler, features Brandon Routh, Nettles, and Swift in primary roles. Routh and Nettles are a married couple while Swift plays the role of a secretary who is having an affair with her married boss (Routh). Routh is shown to be an unfaithful husband throughout the clip and is, ultimately, discovered by Nettles. However, it is later revealed that both women were victims, with Nettles being cheated on and Swift being told by Routh that he loves her and has written love letters to her, but later abandons her, breaking both women's hearts. The video ends with Routh leaving Swift's house to find his front doors locked and his belongings thrown out on the lawn. Nettles, now alone and free, lies down to go to bed, ready to enjoy her new life, and Routh leaves, as Bush, playing their neighbor, witnesses the whole thing while walking his dog. Swift's attire in the music video was compared to that of Christina Hendricks's character Joan Holloway from the television series Mad Men.

== Awards and nominations ==
Year	Organization	Award	Result	Ref.
2018	Country Music Association Awards	Video of the Year	Nominated	
2019	Academy of Country Music Awards	Video of the Year	Nominated	
2019	CMT Music Awards	Duo Video of the Year	Nominated	
2019	CMT Music Awards	Collaborative Video of the Year	Nominated	
2019	Golden Boot Awards	Music Video of the Year	Nominated	
2019	Golden Boot Awards	Collaboration of the Year	Won	

== Live performances ==
Sugarland performed "Babe" for the first time on Live with Kelly and Ryan on May 8, 2018. On June 6, 2018, they performed it on The Today Show live from Blake Shelton's bar, Ole Red. The duo included the track in the set list of their 2018 tour, Still the Same.

On her 2018 Reputation Stadium Tour, Swift performed "Babe" at the Cleveland show on July 17, and the Arlington show on October 6, where Sugarland joined Swift onstage to sing the song together live for the first time. During the fourth show of the Eras Tour in Singapore on March 7, 2024, Swift performed the song in a mashup with her song "Death by a Thousand Cuts" (2019).

== Credits and personnel ==
Credits adapted from Tidal

- Kristian Bush – producer, vocals, acoustic guitar
- Jennifer Nettles – vocals, producer
- Taylor Swift – vocals, songwriter
- Patrick Monahan – songwriter
- Brandon Bush – producer, keyboard, mixing assistance
- Julian Raymond – producer
- Zoe Rosen – producer
- Brianna Steinitz – producer
- Adam Chignon – mix engineering
- Ted Jensen – master engineer
- Tom Tapley – engineer
- Lars Fox – engineer
- Nik Karpen – mixing assistance
- Sean Badum – record engineering assistance
- Kevin Kane – record engineering assistance
- Paul Bushnell – bass
- Victor Indrizzo – drums
- Tom Bukovac – electric guitar
- Chris Lord-Alge – mixing
- Justin Schipper – steel guitar

== Charts ==
=== Weekly charts ===
Chart (2018)	Peak position
Canada Hot 100 (Billboard)	94
Canada Country (Billboard)	16
New Zealand Heatseekers (RMNZ)	10
Scottish Singles Sales (Official Charts)	64
UK Singles Downloads (Official Charts)	72
US Billboard Hot 100	72
US Country Airplay (Billboard)	17
US Hot Country Songs (Billboard)	8

=== Year-end charts ===
Chart (2018)	Position
US Country Airplay (Billboard)	50
US Hot Country Songs (Billboard)	35

== Certification ==
Certification for "Babe"
Region	Certification	Certified units/sales
United States (RIAA)	Gold	500,000^{‡}
^{‡} Sales+streaming figures based on certification alone.

== Release history ==
Region	Date	Format(s)	Label(s)	Ref.
Various	April 20, 2018	Digital download; streaming	Big Machine	
United States	April 20, 2018	Country radio	Big Machine; Universal Music Group Nashville	

== "Babe (Taylor's Version)" ==
"Babe (Taylor's Version) (From the Vault)"

Song by Taylor Swift

from the album Red (Taylor's Version)
- Released: November 12, 2021
- Studio: Conway Recording (Los Angeles); Electric Lady (New York); Rough Customer (New York)
- Genre: Country pop; pop-ska
- Length: 3:44
- Label: Republic
- Songwriters: Taylor Swift; Patrick Monahan
- Producers: Taylor Swift; Jack Antonoff

Lyric video
- "Babe (Taylor's Version)" on YouTube

After signing a new contract with Republic Records, Swift began re-recording her first six studio albums, including Fearless, in November 2020. The decision came after a 2019 public dispute between Swift and the talent manager Scooter Braun, who acquired Big Machine Records, including the masters of Swift's albums the label had released. By re-recording her catalog, Swift had full ownership of the new masters, including the copyright licensing of her songs. In doing so, she would benefit from the financial gains over the Big Machine–owned masters.

After releasing Fearless (Taylor's Version) on April 9, 2021, Swift re-recorded "Babe" for her second re-recorded album, Red (Taylor's Version), released on November 12, 2021, through Republic Records. The official title of the track is "Babe (Taylor's Version) (From the Vault)". Swift posted a snippet of the re-recording on Tumblr a day before the album's release.

=== Composition and reception ===
"Babe (Taylor's Version)"
"Babe (Taylor's Version)" features trumpets and saxophones in the instrumental.

"Babe (Taylor's Version)" is a country pop and pop-ska song with influences of 1970s folk-pop. Its production features slide guitars, trumpets, saxophones, and flutes that were absent from Sugarland's version; Annie Zaleski described "Babe (Taylor's Version)" as a sonic tribute to the 1970s singer-songwriters Carole King and Joni Mitchell. It includes the additional lyrics "What about your promises, promises, promises?" that repeat in the background.

Sheffield thought that it was "worth the wait" for Swift to release her solo version of "Babe", highlighting the "promises, promises" lyric as the new hook. Time ranked it ninth out of Swift's 25 "From the Vault" tracks up until October 2023, describing it as a "pure pop diss track" with the signatures of Swift's best breakup songs. Uproxx's Josh Kurp was not as enthusiastic, deeming Swift's solo version not distinguishable enough from Sugarland's version to truly stand out. "Babe (Taylor's Version)" peaked at number 71 on the Billboard Global 200 chart and at number 56 in Canada. In the US, the track charted at number 69 on the Billboard Hot 100 and number 21 on Hot Country Songs.

=== Credits and personnel ===
Credits adapted from the liner notes of Red (Taylor's Version)

- Taylor Swift – vocals, songwriting, production
- Patrick Monahan – songwriting
- Jack Antonoff – production, acoustic guitar, bass, electric guitar, keyboards, mellotron, percussion, programming, drums, engineering, recording
- Mikey Freedom Hart – acoustic guitar, celesta, Hammond B3, electric guitar, slide guitar, synthesizer, engineering
- Sean Hutchinson – drums, percussion, engineering
- Evan Smith – flute, saxophone, engineering
- Michael Riddleberger – percussion, engineering
- Cole Kamen-Green – trumpet, engineering
- Serban Ghenea – mixing
- Bryce Bordone – mix engineering
- David Hart – engineering
- John Rooney – engineering, engineering assistance
- Laura Sisk – engineering, recording
- Jon Sher – engineering assistance
- Lauren Marquez – engineering assistance

=== Charts ===
Chart (2021)	Peak position
Canada Hot 100 (Billboard)	56
Global 200 (Billboard)	71
US Billboard Hot 100	69
US Hot Country Songs (Billboard)	21

=== Certifications ===
Certifications for "Babe (Taylor's Version)"
Region	Certification	Certified units/sales
Australia (ARIA)	Gold	35,000^{‡}
^{‡} Sales+streaming figures based on certification alone.
