= Bigger (album) =

Studio album by Sugarland
- Released: June 8, 2018
- Recorded: August 2017, February 2018
- Studio: Blackbird Studios; Mission Sound; Ocean Way Studios; The Projector Room; Starstruck Studios
- Genre: Country
- Length: 41:46
- Label: Big Machine
- Producer: Kristian Bush; Jennifer Nettles; Julian Raymond

Sugarland chronology
The Incredible Machine (2010)	Bigger (2018)

Singles from Bigger
- 1. "Still the Same" Released: December 21, 2017; 2. "Babe" Released: April 20, 2018

Bigger is the sixth studio album by American country music duo Sugarland. It was released on June 8, 2018, through Big Machine Records. This is their first album in eight years since 2010's The Incredible Machine, and first on Big Machine.

== Background ==
After a five-year hiatus, at the 51st Annual CMA Awards, Bush and Nettles reunited to present Vocal Duo of the Year. Nettles mentioned all the years that Sugarland won Vocal Duo of the Year, "2007, 2008, 2009, 2010, 2011…and well, who knows?", teasing new music from the duo. After the ceremony, the two tweeted a photo of themselves at the CMA's with the caption #StillTheSame. The lead single "Still the Same" was released on December 21, 2017. Sugarland announced the album, album title and track listing on April 12, 2018. One of the songs on the album, "Babe" features American singer-songwriter Taylor Swift. Swift wrote the song with Train frontman Patrick Monahan for her 2012 studio album Red but the song didn't make the album. After the CMA's Swift got in touch with Sugarland, told them how excited she was that they were getting back together and mentioned she had a song for them. This is the first song Sugarland have recorded that wasn't written by Bush and Nettles.

== Promotion ==
Sugarland performed for the first time in five years at Dick Clark's New Year's Rockin Eve With Ryan Seacrest 2018, and performed "Still the Same". On May 8, 2018 they performed their second single "Babe" on Live with Kelly and Ryan becoming the debut televised performance of the song; the duo then performed the title-track "Bigger" off-camera just for the studio audience.

The duo supported the album on the Still the Same Tour which began on May 4, 2018, in Durant, Oklahoma and concluded later in the year on September 9, in Philadelphia, Pennsylvania.

=== Singles ===
"Still the Same" is the lead single from the album and was released on December 21, 2017.

"Babe" featuring Taylor Swift, the second single from the album, was released on April 20, 2018.

=== Promotional singles ===
The title-track, "Bigger", was released as a promotional single on April 12, 2018. "Mother" was released April 27, 2018 as another promotional single.

== Critical reception ==
Professional ratings
Review scores
Source	Rating
AllMusic	4/5 stars

Stephen Thomas Erlewine of All Music gave it four out of five star rating saying, that the album "does indeed deliver on its titular promise to be a grand, majestic album, but emotions are not in its skyscraper sweep." Brittany McKenna of Rolling Stone was positive saying, "The arrangements of Bigger are grander, the vocals more theatrical, and the themes – which occasionally veer into the political – decidedly more topical. The album takes cue from current trends while adamantly retaining the spirit that made their songs like "Stay" such massive hits. In other words, it's still a Sugarland record, but one tailor-made for our odd moment, where female voices like Nettles' are louder than ever thanks to movements like #MeToo and Time's Up but still largely missing from country radio." Jermey Burchard of Wide Open Country describes the album as "their best yet", and they "are coming back into the county landscape at more creative and promising timing."

== Commercial performance ==
Bigger debuted at No. 2 on Top Country Albums based on 30,000 album equivalent units, 26,000 of which are traditional album sales. It sold another 5,000 copies (7,600 units) the second week. It has sold 57,500 copies in the United States as of December 2018.

== Track listing ==
Adapted from Rolling Stone.

All tracks are written by Jennifer Nettles and Kristian Bush; except "Babe," written by Taylor Swift and Pat Monahan. Additional co-writing on "Love Me Like I'm Leaving" by Tim Owens.

No.	Title	Length
1.	"Bigger"	3:25
2.	"On a Roll"	3:01
3.	"Let Me Remind You"	3:45
4.	"Mother"	3:48
5.	"Still the Same"	3:38
6.	"Lean It On Back"	3:38
7.	"Babe" (featuring Taylor Swift)	3:35
8.	"Bird in a Cage"	3:29
9.	"Love Me Like I'm Leaving"	5:26
10.	"Tuesday's Broken"	3:14
11.	"Not the Only"	4:53
Total length:		41:46

== Personnel ==
Credits adapted from AllMusic.

Vocals and songwriting

- Kristian Bush – vocals, songwriter
- Amie Miriello – background vocals
- Patrick Monahan — songwriter
- Jennifer Nettles – vocals, songwriter
- Tim Owens — songwriter
- Taylor Swift – background vocals, featuring vocals and songwriter

Musicians

- David Angel – violin
- Monisa Angell – violin
- Tom Bukovac – electric guitar
- Brandon Bush – keyboards
- Kristian Bush – acoustic guitar, electric guitar, mandolin
- Paul Bushnell – bass guitar
- Wei Tsun Chang – violin
- Janet Darnell – violin
- Alicia Enstrom – violin
- Victor Indrizzo – drums
- Shawn Pelton – drums
- Carole Rabinowitz – cello
- Danny Rader – electric guitar
- Justin Schipper – steel guitar
- Kristin Wilkinson – violin
- Karen Winkelmann – violin

Production

- Austin Atwood – assistant
- Sandy Spika Borchetta – art direction
- Sean R. Badum – assistant engineer
- Brandon Bush – production coordinator, string arrangements
- Kristian Bush – photography, producer, programming
- Adam Chagnon – engineer
- Justin Ford – art direction, graphic design
- Ted Jensen — mastering
- Kevin Kane – assistant
- Nick Karpen – mixing assistant
- Shervin Lainez – photography
- Chris Lord-Alge – mixer
- Jennifer Nettles – producer
- Juilan Raymond – producer
- Zoe Rosen – assistant, production coordinator
- Brianna Steinitz – production coordinator
- Tom Tapely – engineer
- Myles Turney – assistant engineer
- Butch Walker – vocal producer
- Jeremy Wheatly – mixer
- Howard Willing – string engineer

== Charts ==
=== Weekly charts ===
Chart (2018)	Peak position
Australian Albums (ARIA)	64
Canadian Albums (Billboard)	31
New Zealand Heatseeker Albums (RMNZ)	7
Scottish Albums (OCC)	34
UK Album Downloads (OCC)	34
UK Country Albums (OCC)	3
US Billboard 200	11
US Top Country Albums (Billboard)	2

=== Year-end charts ===
Chart (2018)	Position
US Top Country Albums (Billboard)	63
