= Sit Down, You're Rockin' the Boat =

1950 song written by Frank Loesser

"Sit Down, You're Rockin' the Boat" is a song written by Frank Loesser and published in 1950. The song was introduced in the Broadway musical Guys and Dolls, which opened at the 46th Street Theatre on November 24, 1950. In the context of the show, gambler Nicely-Nicely Johnson recounts a dream about being saved from Hell in order to bring together the members of the prayer meeting. It was performed on stage by Stubby Kaye who later reprised his role as Nicely-Nicely Johnson in the 1953 London production, as well as the 1955 film version of the play.

The song is generally considered to be the 11 o'clock number in Guys and Dolls.

== Notable recordings ==
- The song was recorded by Harpers Bizarre for their third album, The Secret Life of Harpers Bizarre.
- A cover of the song by Don Henley was featured in the soundtrack of the 1992 film Leap of Faith, and hit number 13 on Billboard's Adult Contemporary chart in 1993.
- James Taylor released a cover on his 2020 album American Standard.
- Jennifer Nettles covered the song on her 2021 album Always Like New.
- Cedric Neal covered the song for the 2023 London cast recording.

== In popular culture ==
Television

"Sit Down, You're Rockin' the Boat" was performed in the pilot episode of the show Glee in 2009, and then redone in the season 3 finale, "Goodbye", although it was never released as a single or on any album.

Mac performs part of "Sit Down, You're Rockin' the Boat" on a church cruise in Season 11, Episode 9 of It's Always Sunny in Philadelphia, "The Gang Goes to Hell (Part One)".

Films

The song was sung in the movie The Finest Hours.

Books

The 1979 novel And the Devil Will Drag You Under by Jack Chalker takes its title from a line in "Sit Down, You're Rockin' the Boat".
