= That Girl (album) =

Studio album by Jennifer Nettles
- Released: January 14, 2014
- Recorded: 2013
- Studio: Shangri-La, Malibu; Ocean Way, Hollywood; Daptone's House of Soul, Bushwick
- Genre: Country
- Length: 41:23
- Label: Mercury Nashville
- Producer: Rick Rubin

Jennifer Nettles chronology
That Girl (2014)	Playing with Fire (2016)

Singles from That Girl
- 1. "That Girl" Released: August 19, 2013; 2. "Me Without You" Released: February 10, 2014

That Girl is the debut solo album by American country music artist Jennifer Nettles, lead vocalist of the country duo Sugarland. It was released on January 14, 2014, by Mercury Nashville. The album features 10 songs written or co-written by Nettles and a cover of Bob Seger's "Like a Rock". Nettles collaborated with songwriters Butch Walker, Richard Marx and Sara Bareilles, among others. The album was produced by Rick Rubin at his Shangri-La Studios in Malibu, California.

The album's lead single, the title track, was released in August 2013.

== Critical reception ==
Professional ratings
Aggregate scores
Source	Rating
Metacritic	71/100
Review scores
Source	Rating
AllMusic	3/5 stars
Country Weekly	B+
Got Country Online	4/5 stars
The Oakland Press	3/4 stars
Rolling Stone	3/5 stars
Roughstock	4.5/5 stars
USA Today	4/4 stars

That Girl garnered generally positive reception from music critics. At Metacritic, they assign a weighted average Metascore to the album based upon selected independent rating and review, which based upon six reviews, the album holds a rating of a 71 indicating "generally favorable" reviews. At The New York Times, Jon Caramanica gave a positive review, and highlighted that "Only rarely does this album capture Ms. Nettles’s remarkable voice, a twang-thick burr with real soul-music depth." Brian Mansfield at USA Today rated the album four out of four stars, and affirmed that she "shows off her breathtaking voice." At The Oakland Press, Gary Graff rated the album three out of four stars, and evoked that "We certainly don't want to see Nettles abandon Sugarland, but here’s hoping that she's not done exploring these other musical terrains, either." Mikael Wood of Los Angeles Times gave a positive review, and affirmed that "Her loss sounds liberating." At The Boston Globe, Sarah Rodman gave a positive review, and stated that "While several tunes could appear on a Sugarland album, it is a less commercial, contemporary country-sounding release and there is a sense of individuality stamped on the songs."

Jon Freeman of Country Weekly graded the album a B+, and commented that "The resulting album is earthy, warm and spacious, not sounding too fussed over or suffocated with studio tricks." At Roughstock, Matt Bjorke rated the album four-and-a-half stars, and felt that the release may not contain the country hits like some would expect; however, he wrote that it was "long on charming vocal performances, stellar lyrics and some of the most timeless feeling new songs" he could think of over the past two years. Got Country Online rated it four stars, and commented on that it took many listens to become appreciative of the material, but "when you listen closely you will find an album full of touching, relatable stories told by a strong, emotive voice." However, Allmusic's Thom Jurek rated it three stars, and cautioned that "some of these songs feel too calculated or require more subtlety to completely pull off." At Rolling Stone, Christopher R. Weingarten rated the album three stars out of five, noted how "That Girl doesn't have much of a through line", but "What it does have is plenty to love."

== Track listing ==
No.	Title	Writer(s)	Length
1.	"Falling"	Jennifer Nettles	3:22
2.	"Me Without You"	Nettles, Tim Owens, Derek George	3:37
3.	"Moneyball"	Nettles, Scott Patton	3:13
4.	"That Girl"	Nettles, Butch Walker	4:00
5.	"This Angel"	Nettles, Mike Reid	3:31
6.	"Jealousy"	Nettles, Kevin Griffin	3:51
7.	"This One's for You"	Nettles, Sara Bareilles	3:44
8.	"Know You Wanna Know"	Nettles, Richard Marx	3:05
9.	"Thank You"	Nettles, Phillip Sweet	4:11
10.	"Good Time to Cry"	Nettles, Reid	4:26
11.	"Like a Rock"	Bob Seger	4:23

Exclusive bonus tracks for iTunes and Target Editions
No.	Title	Writer(s)	Length
12.	"His Hands"	Nettles, Hillary Lindsey, Ashley Gorley	4:14
13.	"Every Little Thing"	Nettles, Marx	4:15

== Personnel ==
Musicians

- Jennifer Nettles – lead vocals, backing vocals
- Ian McLagan – keyboards
- Smokey Hormel – acoustic guitars, electric guitars
- Matt Sweeney – acoustic guitars, electric guitars
- Jason Lader – bass guitar
- Chad Smith – drums
- Alex Acuña – percussion
- Lenny Castro – percussion
- The Dap-Kings horn section (11):
- Cochemea Gastelum – baritone saxophone
- Neal Sugarman – tenor saxophone
- Dave Gray – trumpet

Brass, woodwinds and strings

- David Campbell – arrangements and conductor
- Chris Bleth – bass clarinet, alto flute, bass flute, oboe
- Marty Krystall – clarinet
- Steve Kujala – alto flute, bass flute
- Joel Peskin – baritone saxophone
- Brian Scanlon – tenor saxophone
- Steve Holtman – trombone
- David Stout – trombone
- Wayne Bergeron – flugelhorn, trumpet
- Dan Fornero – flugelhorn, trumpet
- Chris Gray – trumpet
- Lee Thornburg – trumpet
- Doug Tornquist – tuba
- Joe Meyer – French horn
- Suzie Katayama – cello, string contractor
- Steve Richards – cello
- Andrew Duckles – viola
- Charlie Bisharat – violin, concertmaster
- Jackie Brand – violin
- Alyssa Park – violin
- Sara Parkins – violin
- Michele Richards – violin
- Josefina Vergara – violin

Production

- Rick Rubin – producer
- Dana Nielsen – recording, digital editing
- Greg Fidelman – recording assistant
- Eric Lynn – recording assistant
- Sean Oakley – recording assistant
- Robin Goodchild – additional recording assistant
- Rouble Kapoor – additional recording assistant
- Sara Killion – additional recording assistant
- Scott Moore – additional recording assistant
- Gabriel Roth – horn recording (11)
- Wayne Gordon – horn recording assistan (11)
- Simon Guzmán – horn recording assistant (11)
- Jason Gossman – digital editing
- Andrew Scheps – mixing at Punkerpad West (Van Nuys, California)
- Justin Hergett – mix assistant
- Stephen Marcussen – mastering at Marcussen Mastering (Hollywood, California)
- Dave Covell – production assistant
- Karen Naff – art direction
- Craig Allen – design
- James Minchin III – photography
- Gail Gellman and Gellman Management – management

== Chart performance ==
The album debuted at No. 5 on the Billboard 200 with sales of 54,046 copies sold. In the following weeks the album sold 19,559, 15,012, and 12,754 respectively for a total of 101,461. The album has sold 200,000 copies in the U.S. as of April 2016.

=== Weekly charts ===
Chart (2014)	Peak position
Canadian Albums (Billboard)	22
US Billboard 200	5
US Top Country Albums (Billboard)	1

=== Year-end charts ===
Chart (2014)	Position
US Billboard 200	134
US Top Country Albums (Billboard)	21

=== Singles ===
Year	Single	Peak chart positions	
Year	Single	US Country	US Country Airplay
2013	"That Girl"	37	37
2014	"Me Without You"	—	50
"—" denotes releases that did not chart
