= Playing with Fire (Jennifer Nettles album) =

2016 album by Jennifer Nettles

Studio album by Jennifer Nettles
- Released: May 13, 2016
- Recorded: 2015–2016
- Studio: Blackbird (Nashville, Tennessee); Starstruck (Nashville, Tennessee); The Castle (Franklin, Tennessee); Hound's Ear (Franklin, Tennessee); The Cabin (Los Angeles, California); Ocean (Burbank, California); Studio Trilogy (San Francisco, California); Mix LA (Tarzana, California); Downtown Music (New York, New York)
- Genre: Country; pop rock
- Length: 42:38
- Label: Big Machine
- Producer: Dann Huff

Jennifer Nettles chronology
That Girl (2014)	Playing with Fire (2016)	To Celebrate Christmas (2016)

Singles from Playing with Fire
- 1. "Unlove You" Released: January 11, 2016; 2. "Hey Heartbreak" Released: September 26, 2016

Playing with Fire is the second studio album by American country music singer Jennifer Nettles. It was released on May 13, 2016, by Big Machine Records. This is her first album with Big Machine after parting ways with Mercury Nashville. Ten of the album's twelve tracks were written or co-written by Nettles. Produced by Dann Huff, the album also features a collaboration with singer Jennifer Lopez, titled "My House".

== Background ==
On making the record Nettles says "The way I approached this whole project was different because I'm a different person than I was several years ago, I have different stories to tell; I have different experiences now." Nettles describes the album as "marrying traditional country styles with newer ones."

== Reception ==
Professional ratings
Review scores
Source	Rating
AllMusic	3.5/5 stars
ABC News	3.5/5 stars

Playing with Fire debuted on the Billboard 200 at No. 10, and Top Country Albums at No. 2, selling 30,800 copies in the first week.

As of February 2017, the album has sold 99,400 copies in the US.

== Track listing ==
No.	Title	Writer(s)	Length
1.	"Playing with Fire"	Jennifer Nettles, Brandy Clark	3:03
2.	"Unlove You"	Nettles, Clark	3:55
3.	"Hey Heartbreak"	Sara Haze, Shane McAnally, Jimmy Robbins	3:34
4.	"Drunk in Heels"	Nettles, Clark	3:22
5.	"Stupid Girl"	Nettles, Bill Sherman	3:38
6.	"Three Days in Bed"	Holly Williams	3:41
7.	"Sugar"	Nettles, Clark, Jesse Jo Dillon	2:55
8.	"Chaser"	Nettles, Clark, McAnally	3:27
9.	"Starting Over"	Nettles, Clark, McAnally	4:13
10.	"Salvation Works"	Nettles, Clark, Lori McKenna	3:51
11.	"Way Back Home"	Nettles	3:31
12.	"My House" (featuring Jennifer Lopez)	Nettles, Julio Reyes Copello, Lopez, McAnally, Josh Osborne	3:28
Total length:			42:38

== Credits and personnel ==
Vocals

- Jennifer Nettles – vocals, backing vocals
- Jennifer Lopez – featured vocals (12)

Instruments

- Charlie Judge – keyboards
- Matt Rollings – acoustic piano
- Jason Bonilla – programming
- David Huff – programming
- Dann Huff – electric guitars, slide guitar solo (10)
- Scott Patton – electric guitars
- Derek Wells – electric guitars, electric guitar solo (1, 6)
- Ilya Toshinskiy – acoustic guitars, mandolin
- Paul Franklin – steel guitar
- Paul Bushnell – bass guitar
- Matt Chamberlain – drums
- Travis McNabb – drums

Production

- Dann Huff – producer
- Julio Reyes Copello – producer (12)
- Justin Niebank – recording (1, 2, 4, 6–11), mixing (1, 3–11)
- Jason Bonilla – recording (2), additional recording (4, 7, 8)
- Bryan Cook – recording (3, 5)
- Steve Marcantonio – recording (3, 5)
- Drew Bollman – recording assistant (1, 2, 4, 6–11), mix assistant (1, 2, 4, 6–11)
- Lance Van Dyke – recording assistant (1, 2, 4, 6–11), mix assistant (1, 2, 4, 6–11)
- Greg Foeller – recording assistant (3, 5), mix assistant (3, 5)
- Zach Hancock – additional recording (1, 2, 6, 9–11)
- Seth Morton – additional recording (1, 2, 4, 6–11)
- Adam Chagnon – additional engineer (2)
- Justin Lieberman – additional recording (3–5)
- Josh Wilson – additional recording assistant (1, 2, 6, 9–11)
- Dominic Rivelli – additional recording assistant (3–5)
- Chris Lord-Alge – mixing (2)
- Nik Karpen – mix assistant (2)
- David Huff – digital editing (1–3, 5, 6, 9–11)
- Sean Neff – digital editing (4, 7, 8)
- Adam Ayan – mastering at Gateway Mastering (Portland, Maine)
- Mike "Frog" Griffith – production coordinator
- Sandi Spika Borchetta – art direction
- Becky Reiser – art direction, graphic design
- Abby Bennett – graphic design
- Justin Ford – graphic design
- Marc Baptiste – photography
- Frankie Foye – hair stylist
- Kristofer Buckle – make-up
- Hayley Atkin – wardrobe

== Charts ==
=== Weekly charts ===
Chart (2016)	Peak position
Canadian Albums (Billboard)	39
UK Country Albums (OCC)	4
US Billboard 200	10
US Top Country Albums (Billboard)	2

=== Year-end charts ===
Chart (2016)	Position
US Top Country Albums (Billboard)	27

== Release history ==
List of release dates, showing region, formats, label, editions and reference
Region	Date	Format(s)	Label	Edition(s)	Ref.
Australia	May 13, 2016	CD; digital download	Big Machine	Standard	
Canada	May 13, 2016	CD; digital download	Big Machine	Standard	
United Kingdom	May 13, 2016	CD; digital download	Big Machine	Standard	
United States	May 13, 2016	CD; digital download	Big Machine	Standard	
