= Cuddle Up, Cozy Down Christmas =

Single by Dolly Parton and Michael Bublé

from the album A Holly Dolly Christmas
- Released: October 2, 2020
- Length: 3:39
- Label: Butterfly; 12 Tone Music Group
- Songwriter: Dolly Parton
- Producer: Kent Wells

Dolly Parton singles chronology
| "Christmas on the Square" (2020) | "Cuddle Up, Cozy Down Christmas" (2020) | "Pink" (2020) |

Michael Bublé singles chronology
| "Elita" (2020) | "Cuddle Up, Cozy Down Christmas" (2020) | "I'll Never Not Love You" (2022) |

Music video
- "Dolly Parton - Cuddle Up, Cozy Down Christmas (with Michael Bublé) (Official Music Video)" on YouTube

"Cuddle Up, Cozy Down Christmas" is a song by American singer-songwriter Dolly Parton and Canadian-Italian singer Michael Bublé. The song was released as a digital download on October 2, 2020 as the fourth single from Parton's forty-seventh solo studio album A Holly Dolly Christmas. The song was written by Dolly Parton and produced by Kent Wells.

== Background ==
"I was cuddled up and cozy down with one of my little nieces and nephews just thinking about mothers and their babies. When I started writing it, it was just like, 'I want to cuddle up and cozy down with you, wrap my arms around you, sleep the whole night through'. It's really about being there with your little baby, kissing and hugging and all that. And then later, I thought, I need to make this into a more romantic thing. So I did."

— Dolly Parton, "Dolly Parton Shares Music Video for Holiday Single 'Cuddle Up, Cozy Down Christmas'", popculture

== Music video ==
A music video to accompany the release of "Cuddle Up, Cozy Down Christmas" was first released onto YouTube on November 7, 2020. The video was directed by Alex Popkin. The animated video shows the two singers performing the song together, Parton wears a Santa outfit with holly in her hair and Bublé sits at a piano.

== Personnel ==
Credits adapted from Tidal.

- Kent Wells – producer, guitar, percussion, voice over
- Andrew Mayer – assistant engineer
- Roy Agee – bass trombone, orchestration, tenor trombone
- Paul Nelson – cello
- Sarighani Reist – cello
- Sam Levine – clarinet, flute, orchestration, saxophone
- Steve Turner – drums, percussion
- Tyler Spratt – editor
- Ryan Enockson – engineer
- Dolly Parton – lead vocals, writer
- Michael Bublé – lead vocals
- David Davidson – orchestral arranger, violin
- Taylor Pollert – orchestral engineer
- Paul Hollowell – piano
- Kevin Willis – tracking engineer
- Dennis Crouch – upright bass
- Chris Farrell – viola
- Monisa Angell – viola
- David Angell – violin
- Janet Darnall – violin
- Karen Winkelmann – violin
- Mary Kathryn Vanosdale – violin
- Stefan Petrescu – violin
- Wei Tsung Chang – violin
- Chris Latham – voice editor

== Charts ==
Chart performance for "Cuddle Up, Cozy Down Christmas"
| Chart (2020–2022) | Peak position |
|---|---|
| Canada AC (Billboard) | 6 |
| Ireland (IRMA) | 52 |
| UK Singles (OCC) | 55 |
| UK Indie (OCC) | 7 |
| US Adult Contemporary (Billboard) | 10 |
