= Unlove You (Jennifer Nettles song) =

Single by Jennifer Nettles

Single by Jennifer Nettles

from the album Playing with Fire
- Released: January 11, 2016
- Genre: Country
- Length: 3:55
- Label: Big Machine
- Songwriter(s): Jennifer Nettles; Brandy Clark
- Producer(s): Dann Huff

Jennifer Nettles singles chronology
"Me Without You" (2014)	"Unlove You" (2016)	"Hey Heartbreak" (2016)

"Unlove You" is a song recorded by American country music artist Jennifer Nettles. It was released in January 2016 as the first single from her second solo studio album, Playing with Fire. Nettles co-wrote the song with Brandy Clark.

== Critical reception ==
An uncredited Taste of Country review of the song was positive, calling it "a straight-down-the-middle country ballad with exceptional vocals" and "a reminder of just how talented of a vocalist she truly is."

== Music video ==
The music video was directed by Trey Fanjoy and premiered in March 2016.

== Chart performance ==
The song has sold 210,000 copies in the US as of August 2016.

=== Weekly charts ===
Chart (2016)	Peak position
US Bubbling Under Hot 100 (Billboard)	16
US Country Airplay (Billboard)	26
US Hot Country Songs (Billboard)	24

=== Year-end charts ===
Chart (2016)	Position
US Hot Country Songs (Billboard)	76
