= That Girl (Jennifer Nettles song) =

Song by Jennifer Nettles

Single by Jennifer Nettles

from the album That Girl
- Released: August 5, 2013
- Genre: Country
- Length: 4:01
- Label: Mercury Nashville
- Songwriters: Jennifer Nettles; Butch Walker
- Producer: Rick Rubin

Jennifer Nettles singles chronology
"Who Says You Can't Go Home" (2006)	"That Girl" (2013)	"Me Without You" (2014)

Music video
- "That Girl" on YouTube

"That Girl" is a song co-written and recorded by American country music singer Jennifer Nettles, lead vocalist of the duo Sugarland. It was released August 20, 2013, via Mercury Nashville as Nettles' first solo single and the lead single from her debut solo album of the same name.

== Content ==
Nettles co-wrote the song with Butch Walker. The song is about a woman who is tricked into having relations with a man who did not reveal that he is already in a relationship. She contacts the man's wife and tells her that "I don't wanna be that girl."

"That Girl" has been described as a lyrical counterpoint to Dolly Parton's classic, "Jolene". Nettles was reportedly inspired by the idea of putting a different spin on the story: "Everyone knows this legendary Dolly song ... But, what is the other side to the story? What if Jolene didn't want to 'take her man, just because she can', so to speak?"

The song is a mid-tempo country record with jazz and Flamenco elements. It features a fairly stripped-down production, driven by a percussion line, hand claps, and an acoustic guitar.

== Critical reception ==
Giving the song a B+, Joseph Hudak of Country Weekly contrasted it with the relationship seen in Sugarland's "Stay", in which the female narrator instead pleads a man to stay with her instead of returning to his wife. He also wrote that "Refreshingly, there’s no slick production here. The payoff, though, is the chanteuse’s smokey vocals, which prove yet again why Jennifer is one of country (or pop’s) most nuanced singers." Matt Bjorke of Roughstock rated it 5 out of 5 stars, saying that "It's simple. It's powerful. And mostly, it's unique in a land of songs about beer and rural field parties".

== Music video ==
The song's music video, directed by Philip Andelman, was filmed in New York City, and features Nettles portraying both female roles in the song. It was released October 4, 2013.

== Chart performance ==
"That Girl" debuted at number 57 on the Billboard Country Airplay chart for the week of August 24, 2013.

Chart (2013)	Peak position
US Country Airplay (Billboard)	37
US Hot Country Songs (Billboard)	37
