= Circle of Love (song) =

Song written by Dolly Parton

"Circle of Love" is a song written by country singer Dolly Parton. It was recorded by country singer Jennifer Nettles and included on her 2016 album To Celebrate Christmas.

The song is also used on the NBC Christmas special Dolly Parton's Christmas of Many Colors: Circle of Love based on a true story by Dolly Parton, written by Pamela K. Long and directed by Stephen Herek. and premieres on November 30, 2016.

On November 29, 2016, Parton, Nettles and the final 10 contestants of season 11 of the U.S. The Voice performed it live.
