= And the Devil Will Drag You Under =

1979 comic fantasy novel by Jack L. Chalker

- First edition cover
- Author: Jack Chalker
- Illustrator: Darrell K. Sweet
- Language: English
- Genre: Fantasy novel
- Publisher: Ballantine/Del Rey
- Publication date: August 1979
- Publication place: United States
- Media type: Print (paperback)
- Pages: 273 pp
- ISBN: 0-345-27926-3
- OCLC: 5337941

And the Devil Will Drag You Under (1979) is a comic fantasy by American writer Jack Chalker involving an alcoholic demon and two humans he summons to collect the pieces of a mystic artifact that the demon requires to save Earth from an asteroid on a collision course. The humans' journeys include both mystical transformations of their bodies and trips to worlds that parodied famous fantasy novel locales.

The book's title is an homage to "Sit Down, You're Rockin' the Boat", a song written by musical theatre composer-lyricist Frank Loesser for Guys and Dolls, in which the character Nicely-Nicely Johnson, making a gospel style confession at a Salvation Army prayer meeting, tells of a dream in which his fellow passengers, on a "little boat to heaven", warn him that if he upsets the ride, he will be washed overboard: "and the Devil will drag you under/By the sharp lapel of your checkered coat...".

== Plot ==
In the year 2079, a human attempt to mine a nearby asteroid instead results in the asteroid being directed towards Earth. As catastrophic natural disasters envelop the world, Mac Walters and Jill McCulloch find themselves in Reno, Nevada. Entering a nearby bar, they encounter a demon named Asmodeus Mogart, who tells them that Earth is but one of thousands of universes set up by the mysterious Department of Probabilities, and that he can save the world if he can gather six magic jewels. Already in possession of one, he transports Walters and McCulloch to separate alternate dimensions to retrieve five more. As the pair return with the jewels, Mogart, an alcoholic, becomes increasingly inebriated. Once the pair, reunited to pursue the sixth and final jewel, return to Mogart, he takes the jewel and saves Earth, before revealing himself to in fact be Satan, and constructing a castle with which to rule over Earth. Walters and McCulloch are able to defeat Mogart, however, and the Department of Probabilities chooses them to jointly guard Earth against further trouble.

== Publication history ==
- 1979, USA, Del Rey (ISBN 0-345-30504-3), publication date August 1979.
