= Still the Same (Sugarland song) =

Single by Sugarland

from the album Bigger
- Released: December 21, 2017
- Recorded: 2017
- Genre: Country rock
- Length: 3:39
- Label: Big Machine; UMG Nashville
- Songwriters: Jennifer Nettles; Kristian Bush
- Producers: Jennifer Nettles; Kristian Bush; Julian Raymond

Sugarland singles chronology
"Run" (2011)	"Still the Same" (2017)	"Babe" (2018)

"Still the Same" is a song written and recorded by American country music duo Sugarland. It was released December 21, 2017 through Big Machine Records, serving as the group's first single in six years and the lead single for their forthcoming sixth studio album, Bigger (2018). "Still the Same" is the group's first new release since their self-imposed hiatus announced in 2012. The song officially impacted American country radio on January 8, 2018; this release was promoted in collaboration between Big Machine and the Universal Music Group Nashville, which houses the group's former label, Mercury Nashville.

== Composition ==
Written by duo members Jennifer Nettles and Kristian Bush, "Still the Same" combines elements of country music and rock music. Acoustic guitars accompany the song's verses, while modern production elements including electronic hand claps are present throughout. The staff of country music blog Taste of Country wrote that "Still the Same" includes "the same blend of sharp songwriting and modern production" that characterized Sugarland's previous discography. Described as a "comeback single," the song's lyrics address the duo's time apart while insisting their chemistry remains intact. The lyrical details are universal enough to double as a love song. "Still the Same" was the first song written for the album after the pair reunited in 2017. Nettles and Bush also co-produced the track with Julian Raymond.

== Commercial performance ==
"Still the Same" debuted and peaked at number 26 on the Billboard Country Airplay chart dated January 3, 2018. This marked the group's highest debut on the chart (surpassing their previous best entrance at number 27 with "All I Want to Do") and first entry on the chart since November 2011. The song debuted at number 42 on the Hot Country Songs chart dated January 3, 2018. It reached its peak position of 35 on the subsequent chart dated January 6, 2018.

== Music video ==
An accompanying music video, directed by Seth Hellman and Nicole Flemmia, premiered December 21, 2017. It explores the group's history with a montage of performances, behind-the-scenes clips, and tour footage.

== Charts ==
Chart (2017–2018)	Peak position
US Country Airplay (Billboard)	26
US Hot Country Songs (Billboard)	35

== Release history ==
Country	Date	Format	Label	Ref.
Worldwide	December 21, 2017	Digital download	Big Machine	
United States	January 8, 2018	Country radio	Big Machine; UMG Nashville	
