= Always Like New =

Studio album by Jennifer Nettles
- Released: June 25, 2021
- Genres: Show tune; country
- Length: 34:48
- Label: Concord
- Producers: Alex Lacamoire; Adam Zotovich; Scott Patton; Jennifer Nettles

Jennifer Nettles chronology
I Can Do Hard Things EP (2019)	Always Like New (2021)

Singles from Always Like New
- 1. "Sit Down, You're Rockin' the Boat" Released: April 9, 2021; 2. "Wait for It" Released: May 7, 2021; 3. "Oh, What a Beautiful Mornin'" Released: June 11, 2021

Always Like New is the fourth solo studio album by American singer Jennifer Nettles. It was released on June 25, 2021, and is her first release under Concord Records. Taking inspiration from Broadway, the album consists of cover songs from Broadway plays and features arrangements by Alex Lacamoire.

Three singles were released from Always Like New, "Sit Down, You're Rockin' the Boat", "Wait for It", and "Oh, What a Beautiful Mornin'".

== Background ==
As a child who grew up in musical theatre, this album feels like a homecoming to me. I savored every note of singing and arranging these songs with Alex Lacamoire. It is thrilling to be able to celebrate this amazing songwriting with arrangements and vocals that allow them to be rediscovered anew.

— Nettles on the production of the album.

== Track listing ==
All tracks are produced by Alex Lacamoire, Adam Zotovich, Scott Patton and Jennifer Nettles.

Always Like New
No.	Title	Writer(s)	Musical	Length
1.	"Wouldn't It Be Loverly"	Alan Lerner; Frederick Loewe	My Fair Lady	3:18
2.	"Sit Down, You're Rockin' the Boat"	Frank Loesser	Guys and Dolls	3:50
3.	"Wait for It"	Lin-Manuel Miranda	Hamilton	3:26
4.	"Almost Like Being in Love"	Lerner; Loewe	Brigadoon	2:58
5.	"It All Fades Away" (featuring Brandi Carlile)	Jason Robert Brown	The Bridges of Madison County	4:15
6.	"There's a Sucker Born Ev'ry Minute"	Cy Coleman; Michael Stewart	Barnum	2:26
7.	"Oh, What a Beautiful Mornin'"	Oscar Hammerstein II; Richard Rodgers	Oklahoma!	3:47
8.	"Anyone Can Whistle"	Stephen Sondheim	Anyone Can Whistle	2:48
9.	"You Will Be Found"	Benj Pasek; Justin Paul	Dear Evan Hansen	5:12
10.	"Tomorrow"	Charles Strouse; Martin Charnin	Annie	2:48
Total length:				34:48

Target exclusive bonus tracks
No.	Title	Writer(s)	Musical	Length
11.	"Not While I'm Around"	Stephen Sondheim	Sweeney Todd
12.	"She Used to Be Mine"	Sara Bareilles	Waitress

== Personnel ==
=== Musicians ===
- Jennifer Nettles – vocals
- Alex Lacamoire – acoustic piano (1, 2, 4, 5, 9, 10), Fender Rhodes (4), celesta (4), Wurlitzer electric piano (8), organ (9)
- Joseph Joubert – acoustic piano (7), organ (7)
- Dillion Kondor – acoustic guitar (1, 4, 8)
- Scott Patton – acoustic guitar (1, 3–6, 8), electric guitar (2, 3, 7, 9)
- Clay Sears – acoustic guitar (3, 9), electric guitar (3, 9)
- Andrew Keenan – dobro (3), acoustic guitar (5, 6), banjo (6), pedal steel guitar (6)
- Jeffrey Carney – upright bass (1)
- Paul Bushnell – bass guitar (2, 3, 9), electric bass (7)
- John Patitucci – upright bass (4)
- Zev Kats – upright bass (5, 6)
- Joshua Day – drums (2, 5–7)
- Victor Indrizzo – drums (3, 9)
- Aaron Heick – saxophones (2, 7)
- Tom Timko – saxophones (2)
- Randy Andos – bass trombone (2)
- Michael Davis – trombone (2, 7)
- Nick Marchoine – trumpet (2, 7)
- Andrew Janss – cello (1, 5)
- Rebecca Young – viola (1, 5)
- Shmuel Katz – viola (5)
- Lisa Kim – violin (1, 5)
- Suzanne Ornstein – violin (1, 5)
- Antoine Silverman – violin (6)
- Casey Erin Clark – backing vocals (2, 7)
- Allyson Kaye Daniel – backing vocals (2, 7)
- Allen René Louis – backing vocals (2, 7)
- Angela Grovey – backing vocals (2, 7)
- Zonya Johnson – backing vocals (2, 7)
- Jason McCollum – backing vocals (2, 7)
- Michael McElroy – backing vocals (2, 7), vocal arrangements (2, 7)
- Anastasia Talley – backing vocals (2, 7)
- Virginia Woodruff – backing vocals (2, 7)
- Brandi Carlile – vocals (5)

=== Production and technical ===
- Adam Zotovich – executive producer
- Alex Lacamoire – producer, arrangements, orchestrations
- Jennifer Nettles – producer, arrangements
- Scott Patton – co-producer
- Joseph Joubert – arrangements (7)
- Ian Kagey – engineer
- Derik Lee – engineer
- Neal Avron – mixing
- Scott Skrzynski – mix assistant
- Bri Holland – editing
- Chris Gehringer – mastering at Sterling Sound (New York City, New York)
- Misa Iwama – music librarian
- Emily Grishman – music copyist
- Aiden Terry – music copyist
- Stephanie Leah Evans – music assistant
- Jacqueline Godfrey – music assistant
- Isaac Hayward – music assistant
- Scott Wasserman – music assistant
- Carrie Smith – art direction
- Sage Lamonica – package design
- Shervin Lainez – photography

== Charts ==
Chart performance for Always Like New
Chart (2021)	Peak position
US Album Sales (Billboard)	32
US Current Album Sales (Billboard)	22

== Release history ==
Release history and formats for Always Like New
Region	Date	Format	Label	Ref.
Various	June 25, 2021	Digital download; streaming	Concord	
United States	June 25, 2021	CD; vinyl	Concord	
