= To Celebrate Christmas =

Studio album by Jennifer Nettles
- Released: October 28, 2016
- Genres: Country; Christmas
- Length: 37:01
- Label: Big Machine
- Producer: Julian Raymond

Jennifer Nettles chronology
Playing with Fire (2016)	To Celebrate Christmas (2016)	I Can Do Hard Things EP (2019)

Professional ratings
Review scores
Source	Rating
AllMusic	3/5 stars

To Celebrate Christmas is the first solo Christmas and third solo studio album by American country music artist Jennifer Nettles, released on October 28, 2016, through Big Machine Records. This is the first Christmas-themed album for Nettles as a solo artist, after previously releasing Gold and Green with Sugarland in 2009.

== Track listing ==
No.	Title	Writer(s)	Length
1.	"Go Tell It on the Mountain"	John Wesley Work, Jr.	2:49
2.	"God Rest Ye Merry Gentlemen" (featuring Andra Day)	Traditional	3:05
3.	"Little Drummer Boy" (featuring Idina Menzel)	Harry Simeone, Katherine K. Davis, Henry Onorati	5:03
4.	"Celebrate Me Home"	Kenny Loggins, Bob James	4:05
5.	"Circle of Love"	Dolly Parton	3:47
6.	"Do You Hear What I Hear"	Noël Regney, Gloria Shayne Baker	3:37
7.	"Count Your Blessings Instead of Sheep"	Irving Berlin	2:58
8.	"O Holy Night"	Adolphe Adam	3:51
9.	"Merry Christmas with Love"	Greg Davis, Billy Smiley	3:53
10.	"The First Noel"	Traditional	3:53
Total length:			37:01

== Personnel ==
Musicians

- Jennifer Nettles – lead vocals
- Tim Lauer – keyboards (1–4, 6–9), accordion (5), acoustic piano (10), arrangements
- Tom Bukovac – electric guitars (1–4, 6–9)
- Danny Rader – acoustic guitars (1–9)
- Paul Franklin – pedal steel guitar (1, 3, 4, 6–9), dobro (2)
- Jimmie Lee Sloas – bass guitar (1–3, 6, 7, 9)
- Dorian Crozier – drums (1–4, 6–9)
- Sam Levine – baritone saxophone (1, 4, 8)
- Jim Hoke – tenor saxophone (1, 4, 8), horn arrangements (1, 2, 4, 8), clarinet (2)
- Roy Agee – trombone (1, 4, 8)
- Steve Herrman – trumpet (1, 2, 4, 8)
- Steve Patrick – trumpet (1, 4, 8)
- Alfreda McCrary-Lee – backing vocals (1)
- Ann McCrary – backing vocals (1)
- Regina McCrary – backing vocals (1)
- Deborah Person – backing vocals (1)
- Andra Day – lead vocals (2)
- Whitney Coleman – backing vocals (2, 4, 6–9)
- Jeffrey Holstein – backing vocals (2, 4, 6–9)
- Kiely Phillips – backing vocals (2, 4, 6–9)
- Idina Menzel – lead vocals (3)

Technical personnel

- Nicole Dovolis – A&R
- Julian Raymond – producer, arrangements
- Howard Willing – recording
- Seth Morton – recording assistant (1, 2, 4, 6, 9)
- Owen Lewis – recording assistant (1, 2, 4, 6–9)
- Jason Mott – recording assistant (3, 7, 8)
- Adam Chagnon – additional engineer
- Chris Lord-Alge – mixing
- Nik Karpen – mix assistant
- Lars Fox – editing
- Ted Jensen – mastering at Sterling Sound (New York City, New York)
- Laurel Kittleson – production coordinator
- Doug Rich – production coordinator
- Janice Soled – production coordinator
- Brianna Steinitz – production coordinator
- Sandi Spika Borchetta – art direction
- Becky Reiser – art direction
- Justin Ford – graphic design
- Marc Baptiste – photography
- Hayley Atkin – wardrobe

== Charts ==
To Celebrate Christmas debuted at No. 151 on the Billboard 200, selling 4,700 copies in its first week of release. As of November 2017, the album has sold 59,900 copies in the US.

=== Weekly charts ===
Chart (2016)	Peak position
US Billboard 200	66
UK Country Albums (Official Charts)	18
US Top Country Albums (Billboard)	13
US Top Holiday Albums (Billboard)	10

=== Year-end charts ===
Chart (2017)	Position
US Top Country Albums (Billboard)	82

== Release history ==
Region	Date	Format(s)	Label	Ref.
United States	October 28, 2016	CD; DL	Big Machine	
