= Jennifer Nettles =

American singer, record producer, and actress (born 1974)

- Nettles in 2026

Background information
- Born: Jennifer Odessa Nettles; September 12, 1974 (age 52); Douglas, Georgia, U.S.
- Genres: Country; country pop; pop
- Occupations: Singer; songwriter; record producer; actress
- Instruments: Vocals; guitar
- Years active: 1991–present
- Labels: Mercury Nashville; Big Machine; Concord
- Member of: Sugarland
- Website: jennifernettles.com

Jennifer Odessa Nettles (born September 12, 1974) is an American singer, songwriter, actress, and record producer.

Nettles is the lead vocalist of the duo Sugarland alongside Kristian Bush, and prior to this she fronted the Atlanta-based bands Soul Miner's Daughter and Jennifer Nettles Band. She charted as a duet partner on the country version of rock band Bon Jovi's 2006 single "Who Says You Can't Go Home", a number-one hit on the Billboard country chart. Throughout her career, she has acquired numerous accolades, including three Grammy Awards, four Country Music Association Awards, and an American Music Award for her work both as a soloist and as one half of the duo Sugarland. Nettles was a judge on Go-Big Show (2021–22).

== Personal life ==
Nettles was born and raised in the small town of Douglas, Georgia, United States, graduating from Coffee High School and Agnes Scott College in Decatur, Georgia. Nettles married Todd Van Sickle in 1998; the couple divorced in 2007. On November 26, 2011, Nettles married her boyfriend of two years, Justin Miller, in a sunset ceremony at Blackberry Farm in East Tennessee. On June 18, 2012, they announced they were expecting their first child in November 2012. Their son was born in December 2012.

== Musical beginnings ==
Nettles began performing at school assemblies, her Southern Baptist church, and in community theater. She was also a member of Georgia 4-H's Clovers & Company performing arts group from 1986 to 1993.

Nettles studied Spanish and Anthropology at Agnes Scott College in Decatur, Georgia, and graduated in 1997. While a student there, Nettles and Cory Jones (who at the time was studying classical guitar at the University of Georgia) formed the group Soul Miner's Daughter. Performing as both an acoustic duo and with a band, they released two albums: The Sacred and Profane in 1996 and Hallelujah in 1998, both of which were composed of songs written collaboratively by Jones and Nettles. Soul Miner's Daughter was invited to perform at the Atlanta installment of Lilith Fair in 1999.

In 1999, she formed the Jennifer Nettles Band, with which she released three studio albums and two live albums. The band, which in addition to Nettles included Brad Sikes (drums), Scott Nicholson (piano), Wesley Lupold (bass), and Mike Cebulski (percussion), was selected the grand prize winner from more than 2000 bands in "The Big Deal $100,000 Music Search" presented by Mars Music.

== Sugarland ==
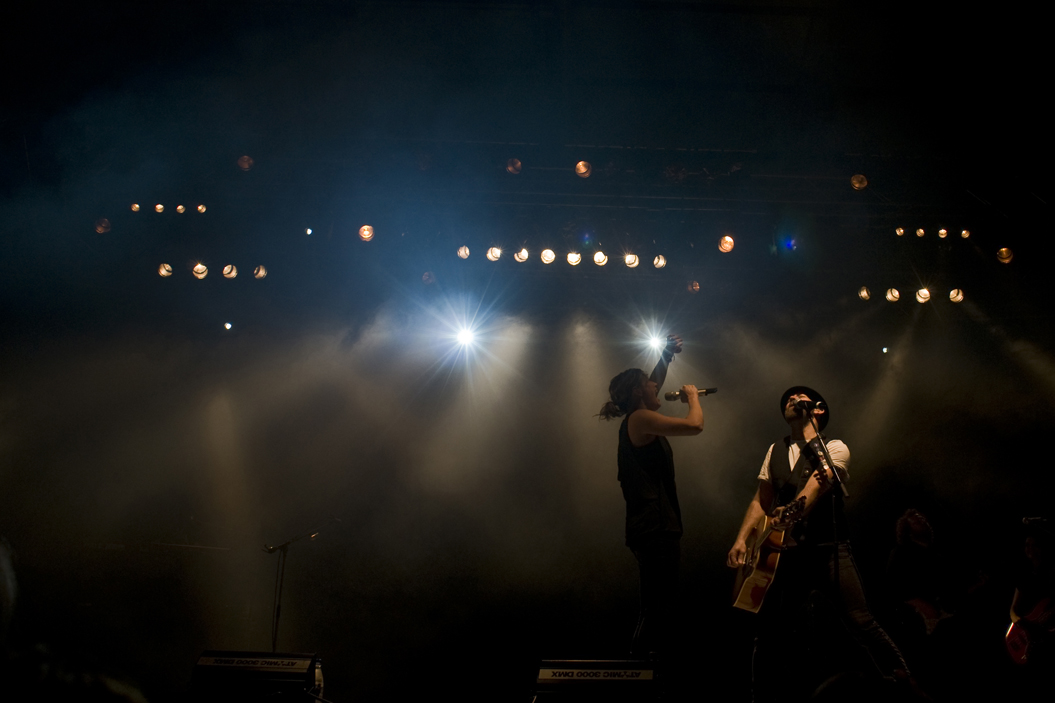
Jennifer Nettles and Kristian Bush on stage, 2009

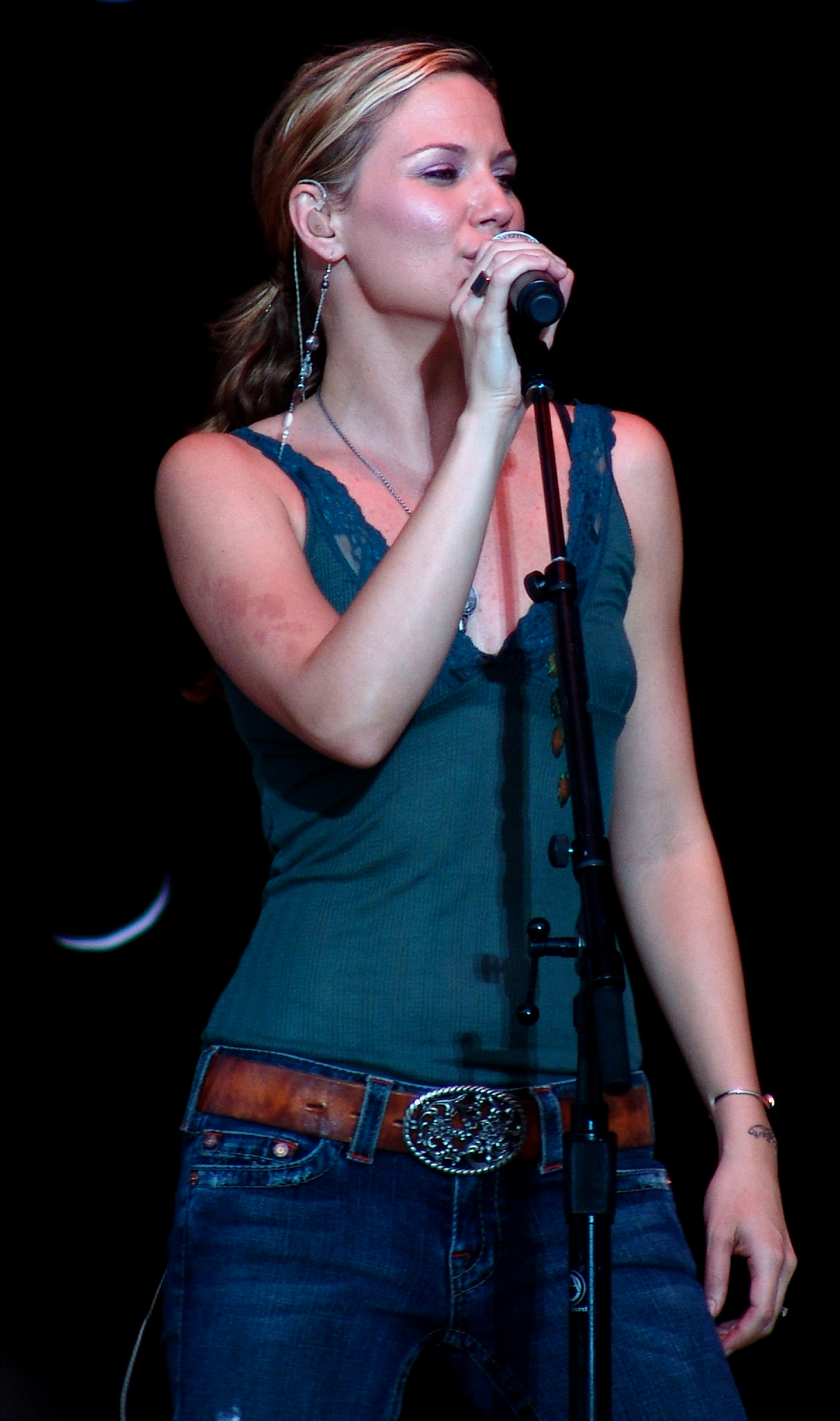
Sugarland at Elkhart, Indiana County Fair, July 2006

In 2003, Nettles teamed up with Kristen Hall and Kristian Bush to form Sugarland. In 2006, Hall left the group and Nettles and Bush continued on as a duo releasing Enjoy the Ride in November 2006. Their third album, titled Love on the Inside, was released on July 22, 2008. Regarding the trio's collaboration, she said:

We really wanted to get out of where we had all been as artists and move beyond that to something bigger. Consequently all the songs reflect that; 'Fly Away,' 'Baby Girl,' all of those songs - you speak to the human condition and write what you know in your life.

Sugarland was nominated for a Grammy award in the Best New Artist category in 2006. Although they did not win the award, Nettles and Bush performed for the awards show and Nettles presented both a Lifetime Achievement Award to Merle Haggard and the award for Best Country Group.

A duet performance with rock band Bon Jovi, "Who Says You Can't Go Home", reached No. 7 on the Bubbling Under Hot 100 chart and No. 1 on the Billboard Hot Country Singles chart. The video for the song won a CMT Music Award in 2006 for Collaborative Video Of The Year. In February 2007, Nettles and Bon Jovi won a Grammy for Best Country Vocal Collaboration.

In an interview on Fox News with Martha MacCallum, Nettles expressed interest in appearing in a Broadway play, stating in particular that she would like to play the role of Elphaba in Wicked.

In early December 2008, Sugarland received three Grammy Award nominations and performed on the 51st Annual Grammy Awards show on February 8, 2009. They won awards for Best Country Song and Best Country Performance by a Duo or Group.

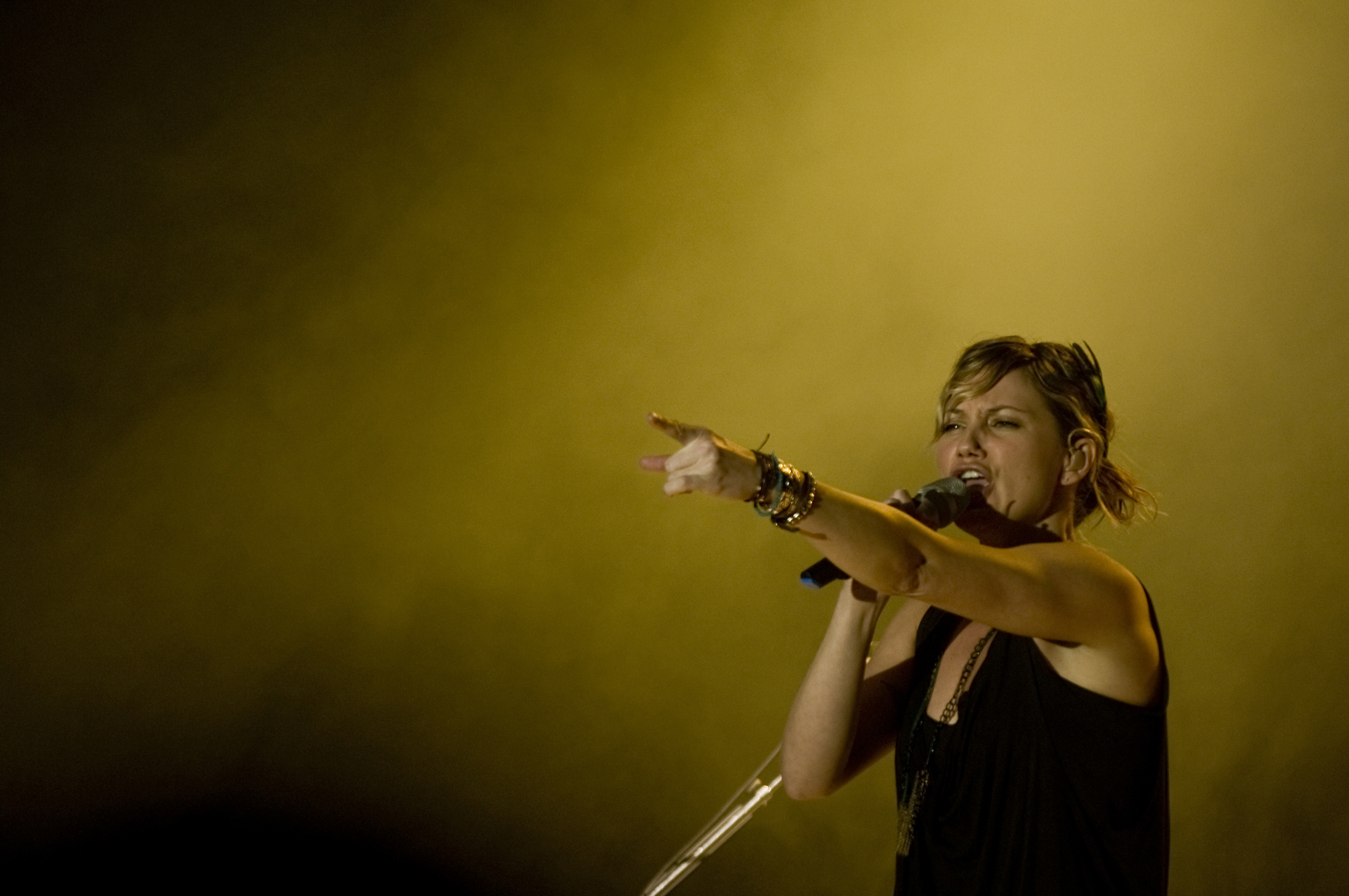
Jennifer Nettles during a concert in March 2009, at Ramstein Air Base, Germany.

On January 18, 2009, Nettles performed at the We Are One: The Obama Inaugural Celebration at the Lincoln Memorial, singing James Taylor's "Shower the People" with James Taylor and John Legend.

On February 11, 2009, Sugarland received two nominations from the Academy of Country Music for Top Vocal Duo and Vocal Event of the Year for "Life in a Northern Town". During the broadcast of the April 5, 2009 awards show, Sugarland was presented with the Vocal Duo of the Year award, ending Brooks & Dunn's nine-year run. Nettles also received a Milestone award, presented to her by Reba McEntire.

ABC broadcast the first CMA Country Christmas, hosted by Nettles, on November 29, 2010. Nettles and Sugarland partner Kristian Bush kicked off the evening with their rendition of "Winter Wonderland", backed by Little Big Town. The pair returned to the stage later in the program to perform the hymn "Come, O Come Emmanuel", just before the "Jingle Bell Rock" group grande finale of the 90-minute special. Until 2016, Nettles was the sole host of Country Christmas but was replaced by Reba McEntire for the 2017 show.

After a five-year hiatus while Nettles and Bush recorded solo projects, Sugarland officially reunited in 2017 at the 51st Annual Country Music Association Awards and announced that they were working on new music together. The lead single off their sixth studio album Bigger, “Still the Same" was released on December 21, 2017.

== Duets and solo career ==
In 2009, Jennifer Nettles performed at the Kennedy Center Honors for Bruce Springsteen and a second time in 2011 for Neil Diamond.

In 2012, Nettles appeared as a judge on the ABC singing competition series Duets alongside Kelly Clarkson, John Legend and Robin Thicke. The show was cancelled after one season.

Nettles announced in May 2013 that she would begin working on a solo album. Her first solo single, "That Girl", was released in August. Nettles co-wrote the song with Butch Walker, and Rick Rubin produced it. The album, also titled That Girl, was released on January 14, 2014, after Ray Price's death.

On June 4, 2014, Nettles performed "All of Me" with John Legend and Hunter Hayes at the CMT Music Awards.

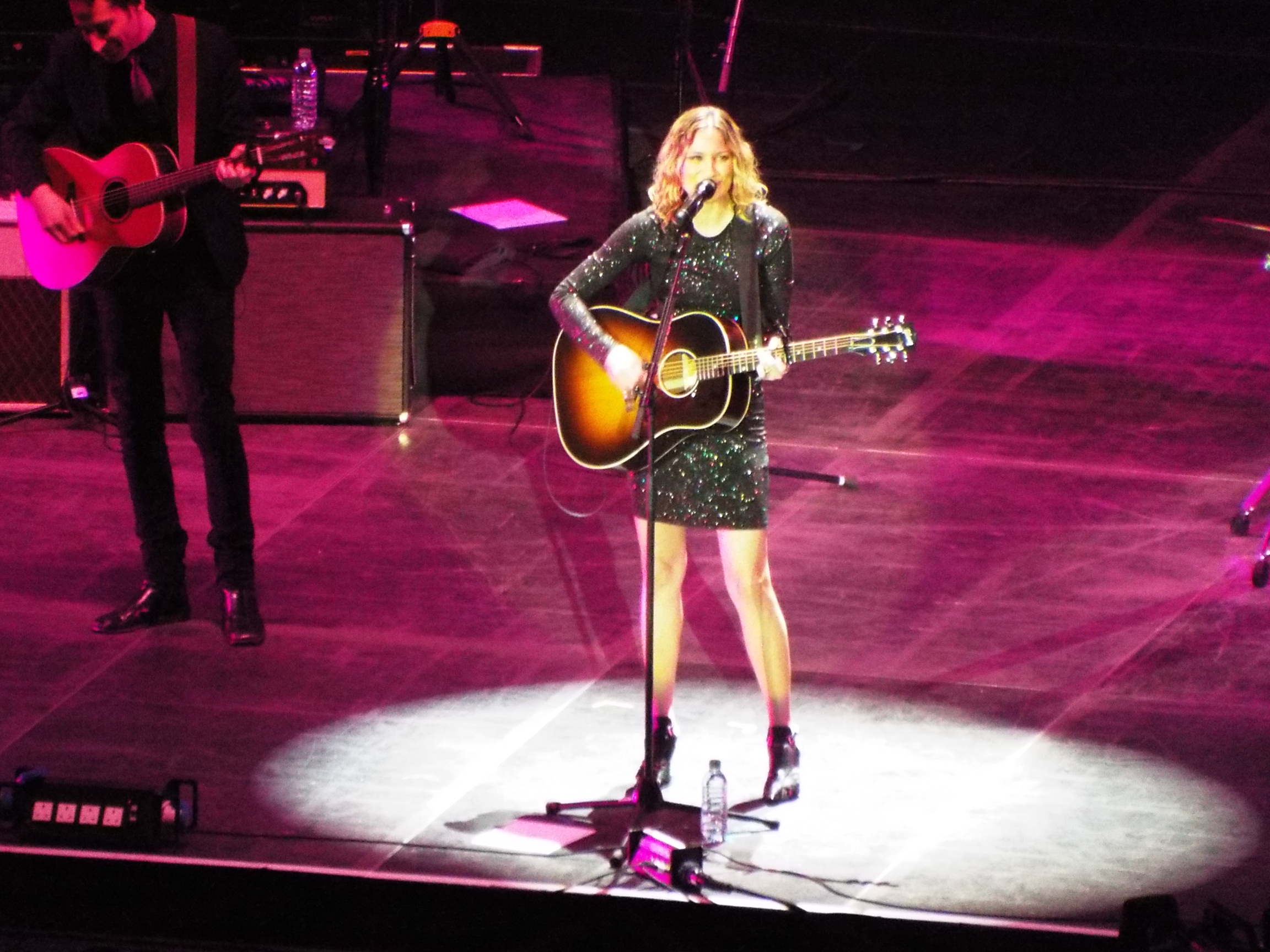
Nettles on stage at the C2C festival in 2017

In July 2015, Nettles parted ways with Mercury Nashville. Nettles then signed with Big Machine Label Group. Nettles announced that she would be going on the "Playing With Fire Tour" with Ryan Kindler and Brandy Clark as her opening acts. The tour was then extended by CMT and promoted as "CMT Presents Jennifer Nettles with 2016 Next Women of Country Tour" with Brandy Clark and special guest Lindsay Ell and Tara Thompson for over 30 dates across the country starting in January 2016. Nettles then released a music video for her song "Sugar", she would be performing this song, which is off her upcoming album, at the 89th Macy's Thanksgiving Day Parade on the Domino Sugar float. Nettles then released the first official single, off her upcoming album with Big Machine, "Unlove You" which she debuted on The Tonight Show Starring Jimmy Fallon on November 24. In March 2017, Nettles made her international solo debut at the C2C: Country to Country festival. For six years in a row she has hosted the CMA Country Christmas on ABC. In 2018 Jennifer Nettles duetted with Josh Groban on his "Bridges" and "Bridges Live" albums with the Groban-penned song "99 Years". In December 2019 Nettles ended her solo deal with Big Machine Records but her duo Sugarland signed an exclusive deal with Big Machine.

To coincide with the sixteenth anniversary of the 9/11 attack, Nettles released a song called "King of the City", which tells the story of an immigrant who lost his life during the tragedy. Of the track, Nettles said "it has been so long since I started writing this song, but I was only able to finish it in the last year. I was inspired by the political tensions in our country right now. I want to humanize the immigrant story as an American story, and allow people a different narrative from what they might, or might not, be seeing on the news or in their communities".

== Acting ==
Nettles made her acting debut in the NBC television movie, Dolly Parton's Coat of Many Colors portraying Dolly Parton's mother. It premiered on December 10, 2015. She reprised her role in the sequel Dolly Parton's Christmas of Many Colors: Circle of Love which premiered on November 30, 2016.

In February 2015, Nettles joined the Broadway cast of Chicago, where she played the role of Roxie Hart for a limited engagement. In April 2016, she had a role on the WGN America series Underground. Her role was as a wife and mother who became a mental patient.

Since 2019, Nettles has portrayed Aimee-Leigh Gemstone, the deceased matriarch (featured in flashbacks) of a fictional Southern evangelical family in HBO's dark comedy series The Righteous Gemstones. She also co-starred in the drama Harriet, about abolitionist Harriet Tubman, playing Eliza Brodess. The film was directed by Kasi Lemmons.

She played the lead role of Jenna in the musical Waitress on Broadway from October 19 to November 25, 2021.

Nettles plays Miranda, the mother of a young girl named Katherine, who is possessed by a demon after performing a séance, in the 2023 film The Exorcist: Believer.

Nettles plays Maryanne, the ex-wife of Hub Halloran, in the 2025 Amazon Prime series The Bondsman.

Nettles' musical, Giulia: The Poison Queen of Palermo, based on the life of 17th Century Italian Apothecary Giulia Tofana, will be premiering at the Perelman Performing Arts Center (PAC NYC) in June 2026. Nettles has written the book, music, and lyrics and will be starring in the title role of Giulia.

== Activism ==
Nettles has lent her time and talent to support various non-profit organizations. Nettles has been a longtime supporter of the Shalom Foundation. She raised more than $120,000 for the foundation in 2007.

In 2008, she launched Common Thread, a series of musical events enabling artists to come together to share music and raise money for their favorite charities. The first three Common Thread concerts included performances by Nettles, Sugarland partner Kristian Bush, Emily Saliers, and Amos Lee and raised funds for the American Cancer Society, American Liver Foundation, Honor the Earth, and Intercultural Family Services.

Following the January 2010 earthquake in Haiti, Nettles and Sugarland partner Bush sang on the remake of We Are the World as part of Artists for Haiti.

In February 2012, Nettles was one of a group of celebrities who walked down a catwalk in red dresses for the 'Heart Truth Red Dress Collection' show, part of New York Fashion Week. She wore a David Meister dress.

In November 2019, Nettles attended the CMA Awards wearing a Christian Siriano design with a hot-pink train. The train had a hand-painted graffiti painting by Alice Mizrahi and a message stating "play our [expletive] records; Please and Thank You", and the backside said "equal play". Nettles' outfit was in protest of country music radio stations not giving equal play time to female artists.

At the 2020 CMT Music Awards, she was recognized for her activism in the fight for equal play with the first CMT Equal Play award.

== Discography ==
=== Studio demos ===
As Jennifer Nettles
Year	Album
1991	For Your Love / You're the One: Two-song Demo Cassette on Timme Records label.

=== Studio albums ===
Soul Miner's Daughter
Year	Album
1996	The Sacred and Profane
1998	Hallelujah

As Jennifer Nettles Band
Year	Album
2000	Story of Your Bones
2002	Gravity: Drag Me Down
2002	Rewind

As Jennifer Nettles
Title	Details	Peak chart positions				Sales
Title	Details	US	US Country	CAN	UK Country	Sales
That Girl	Release date: January 14, 2014; Label: Mercury Nashville	5	1	22	—	US: 200,000
Playing with Fire	Release date: May 13, 2016; Label: Big Machine	10	2	39	4	US: 99,400
To Celebrate Christmas	Release date: October 28, 2016; Label: Big Machine	66	13	—	18	US: 59,900
Always Like New	Released: June 25, 2021; Label: Concord	—	—	—	—	
"—" denotes releases that did not chart

=== Extended plays ===
Title	Details
I Can Do Hard Things	Release date: June 7, 2019; Label: Big Machine

=== Live albums ===
As Jennifer Nettles
Year	Album
2003	An Acoustic Evening with Jennifer Nettles
2004	An Acoustic Evening with Jennifer Nettles II

=== Solo singles ===
Year	Single	Peak chart positions			Album
Year	Single	US Country	US Country Airplay	US Bubbling	Album
2013	"That Girl"	37	37	—	That Girl
2014	"Me Without You"	—	50	—	That Girl
2016	"Unlove You"	24	26	16	Playing with Fire
2016	"Hey Heartbreak"	—	—	—	Playing with Fire
2019	"I Can Do Hard Things"	—	—	—	I Can Do Hard Things EP
2021	"Sit Down, You're Rockin' the Boat"	—	—	—	Always Like New
2021	"Wait for It"	—	—	—	Always Like New
2021	"Oh, What a Beautiful Mornin'"	—	—	—	Always Like New
"—" denotes releases that did not chart

=== Guest singles ===
Year	Single	Artist	Peak chart positions										Album
Year	Single	Artist	US Country	US Country Airplay	US	US AC	CAN	NOR	IRE	NZ	SWE	SPA	Album
2006	"Who Says You Can't Go Home"	Bon Jovi	1	—	—	—	—	—	—	—	—	—	Have a Nice Day
2010	"We Are the World 25 for Haiti"	Artists for Haiti	—	—	2	—	7	1	9	8	5	15	—N/a
2014	"Christmas Day"	Michael W. Smith	—	—	—	—	—	—	—	—	—	—	The Spirit of Christmas
2015	"Here It Is Christmas/Baby, It's Cold Outside"	Kenny Rogers	—	—	—	18	—	—	—	—	—	—	Once Again It's Christmas
2020	"Do What You Can"	Bon Jovi	—	28	—	—	—	—	—	—	—	—	2020
2024	"Never Been Over"	Darius Rucker	—	—	—	—	—	—	—	—	—	—	—N/a
"—" denotes releases that did not chart

=== Other charted songs ===
Year	Single	Peak chart positions		Album
Year	Single	US Country	US AC	Album
2016	"Little Drummer Boy" (featuring Idina Menzel)	—	12	To Celebrate Christmas
2016	"Do You Hear What I Hear?"	—	20	To Celebrate Christmas
2016	"O Holy Night"	46	—	To Celebrate Christmas

=== Music videos ===
Year	Title	Director
2006	"Who Says You Can't Go Home" (with Bon Jovi)	Anthony M. Bongiovi
2010	"We Are the World 25 for Haiti" (as USA for Haiti)	Paul Haggis
2013	"That Girl"	Philip Andelman
2014	"His Hands" (with Brandy Clark)	Shaun Silva/Valarie Allyn Bienas
2015	"Sugar"	Declan Whitebloom
2016	"Unlove You"	Trey Fanjoy
2016	"Hey Heartbreak"	Shane Drake
2020	"Do What You Can"	
2021	"Oh, What A Beautiful Mornin'"	

== Awards ==
- 1999 Lilith Fair Acoustic Talent Search winner, Soul Miner's Daughter
- 2001 1st Annual Independent Music Awards Regional Poll in Atlanta for "Bad Girl's Lament"
- 2005 American Music Awards, Sugarland wins Favorite Breakthrough Artist
- 2006 Academy of Country Music, Sugarland wins Top New Duo or Vocal Group
- 2006 CMT Collaborative Video of the Year, "Who Says You Can't Go Home"
- 2007 Grammy Award Best Country Collaboration with Vocals, "Who Says You Can't Go Home"
- 2007 Country Music Association Awards, Sugarland wins Vocal Duo Of the Year
- 2008 Country Music Association Awards, Sugarland wins Vocal Duo Of the Year
- 2008 Academy of Country Music, Song of the Year, "Stay" (songwriter)
- 2008 Country Music Association Awards Song of the Year, "Stay" (songwriter)
- 2009 Grammy Award Best Country Performance By A Duo Or Group for "Stay"
- 2009 Grammy Award Best Country Song for "Stay" (songwriter)
- 2009 Academy of Country Music, Milestone award; Sugarland wins Vocal Duo of the Year
- 2009 Country Music Association Awards, Sugarland wins Vocal Duo Of the Year
- 2010 Country Music Association Awards, Sugarland wins Vocal Duo Of the Year
- 2011 Academy of Country Music, Sugarland wins Vocal Duo of the Year
- 2011 Country Music Association Awards, Sugarland wins Vocal Duo Of the Year
- 2020 CMT Equal Play Award from the CMT Music Awards
- 2023 Daytime Emmy Award for Outstanding Original Song, “Life is Sweet” from the PBS show American Anthems.

== Filmography ==
=== Film ===
Year	Title	Role	Notes
2015	Dolly Parton's Coat of Many Colors	Avie Lee Parton	Television movie
2016	Dolly Parton's Christmas of Many Colors: Circle of Love	Avie Lee Parton	Television movie
2019	Harriet	Eliza Brodess	
2023	The Exorcist: Believer	Miranda West	
2026	Heartland	Winnie Jo Lean	

=== Television ===
Year	Title	Role	Notes
2005	CMT Crossroads	Herself	Episode: "Bon Jovi and Sugarland"
2010–16	CMA Country Christmas	Herself/host	7 specials
2012	Duets	Herself	9 episodes
2016	CMT Crossroads	Herself	Episode: "Cheap Trick and Jennifer Nettles"
2016	Underground	Charlotte	Episode: "Cradle"
2018	The Launch	Mentor	Episode: "Ain’t Easy"
2019–25	The Righteous Gemstones	Aimee-Leigh Gemstone	13 episodes
2020	Puppy Dog Pals	Capo (Voice)	Episode: "Music City Mishap"
2021–22	Go-Big Show	Herself/Panelist	
2023	The Masked Singer	Herself/Guest Panelist	Episode: "Sesame Street Night"
2023–24	Farmer Wants a Wife	Host	
2025	The Bondsman	Maryanne Dice	Main role

=== Theatre ===
Year	Title	Role	Venue	Notes
2015	Chicago	Roxie Hart	Broadway, Ambassador Theatre	
2017	Mamma Mia!	Donna Sheridan	Los Angeles, Hollywood Bowl	
2021	Waitress	Jenna	Broadway, Ethel Barrymore Theatre	
2026	Giulia: The Poison Queen of Palermo	Giulia Tofana	Off-Broadway, Perelman Arts Center	Also composer, lyricist, bookwriter
