= Bon Jovi discography =

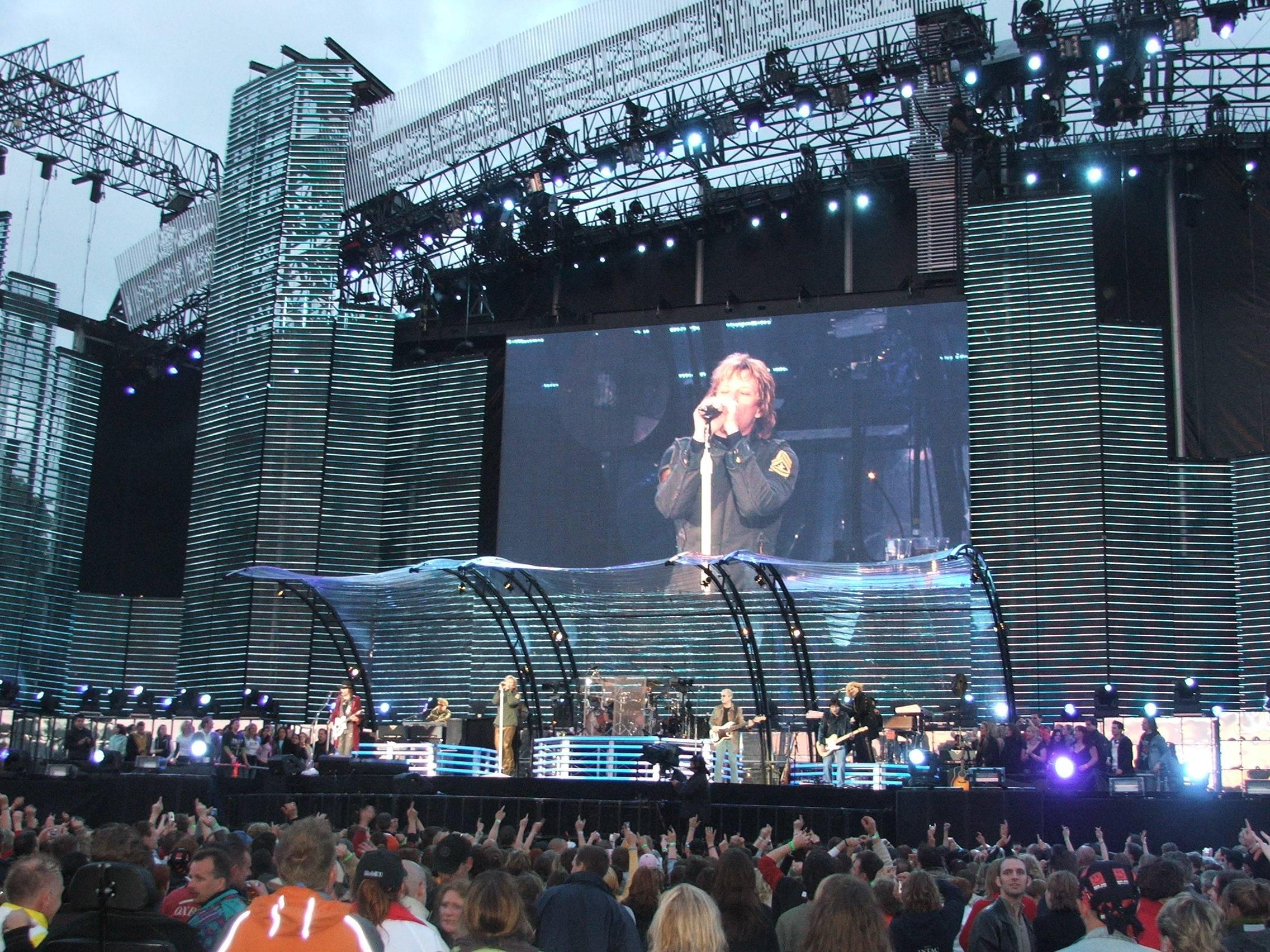
- Bon Jovi in concert, Nijmegen, Netherlands, 2006
- Studio albums: 16
- Live albums: 3
- Compilation albums: 5
- Singles: 67
- Video albums: 14
- Music videos: 72
- Box set albums: 1
- Extended plays: 5

American rock band Bon Jovi has released 16 studio albums, three live albums, five compilation albums, five EPs, 67 singles, 14 video albums, and 72 music videos. Bon Jovi has sold over 150 million records worldwide, making them one of the best-selling bands of all time. As of 2018, the band has sold 21.8 million albums in the US Nielsen SoundScan era. Billboard ranked Bon Jovi as the 45th Greatest Artist of all time, achieving six No. 1 albums on the Billboard 200 and four No. 1 hits on the Billboard Hot 100. According to Recording Industry Association of America, Bon Jovi has sold 42 million albums in the United States (including one diamond album, five multi-platinum albums, 11 platinum albums and 14 gold albums).

The group's first commercial release was the single "Runaway" from its eponymous debut (1984), which had a modest success in the US. Its sophomore album 7800° Fahrenheit (1985) achieved bigger success than its predecessor being the band's first album to be certified gold by the Recording Industry Association of America (RIAA) for shipping 500,000 copies in the US.

Bon Jovi achieved widespread global recognition with its third album Slippery When Wet (1986), which remains their best-selling album to date with over 28 million copies sold worldwide. It reached No. 1 in Australia, Canada, and the US, where it spent eight weeks at the top of the Billboard 200 and was certified 15× Platinum by the RIAA. The album's first two singles "You Give Love a Bad Name" and "Livin' on a Prayer" reached No. 1 on the Billboard Hot 100 chart. Bon Jovi's fourth album New Jersey (1988) achieved similar global success, producing five top-10 singles on the Billboard Hot 100, of which "Bad Medicine" and "I'll Be There for You" topped the chart.

Keep the Faith (1992) marked a change in the band's appearance and sound, eschewing the glam metal from its 1980s albums in favor of a different hard rock sound. The album debuted at No. 1 in the UK and Australia, cracked the top 5 in the US and was certified 2× Platinum by the RIAA for shipping two million copies in the United States. The ballad "Bed of Roses" peaked at No. 10 on the Billboard Hot 100 and the album's title track hit No. 1 on the Mainstream Rock Tracks. The greatest hits album Cross Road (1994) debuted at No. 1 and was the best-selling album in United Kingdom for 1994. "Always", the first of the compilation's two new tracks, spent six months in the top 10 of the Billboard Hot 100, was certified platinum in the US and became Bon Jovi's highest selling single.

These Days (1995) was the group's first release after the departure of bassist Alec John Such. The record was a commercial success in the Asian and European markets, debuting at No. 1 in the UK and spending four consecutive weeks at the top. In Japan, the album topped the Oricon chart with first week sales of 379,000 copies, becoming the second fastest selling international album in chart's history. Its lead single "This Ain't a Love Song" reached No. 14 in the US and No. 6 in the UK. Crush (2000) became the band's sixth and fifth consecutive No. 1 album in Australia and the United Kingdom, respectively, and reached 2× Platinum in the US. The success of the album was largely due to its lead single "It's My Life" which was nominated for a Grammy Award for Best Rock Performance by a Duo or Group, while the album was nominated for Best Rock Album at the 2001 ceremony.

Bounce (2002) and Have a Nice Day (2005) debuted at No. 2 on the Billboard 200, Bon Jovi's highest debuts in the band's 20-year history up to that point. The lead single "Have a Nice Day" was an international hit, reaching the top 10 in Australia, Europe and the UK. The second single "Who Says You Can't Go Home" reached No. 1 on the Billboard Hot Country Songs after being remixed into a country duet with Jennifer Nettles. With success of the single, Bon Jovi was the first rock band to have reached the top spot on both the rock and country Billboard chart. The song's success inspired the Nashville-influenced tenth studio record Lost Highway (2007). The album debuted at No. 1 in the US, making it the band's first No. 1 in its home country since the late eighties. Although the album achieved great success, including a Grammy nomination for Best Pop Vocal Album, the band returned to its rock roots with the eleventh studio album The Circle (2009), which debuted at No. 1 on the Billboard 200. The lead singles from both albums "(You Want to) Make a Memory" and "We Weren't Born to Follow" received Grammy nominations for Best Pop Performance by a Duo or Group with Vocals.

The second greatest hits album Greatest Hits (2010) was released as a single-disc version and as an enhanced double-disc version which features four new songs. It performed well in Australia, reaching 3× platinum in two months. The album's first single was "What Do You Got?" and its accompanying music video was the first Bon Jovi music video to be filmed in 3D. What About Now (2013) was the band's fifth release to reach the top of the Billboard 200, debuting at No. 1. Its lead single "Because We Can" was released two months before the album. This was followed by the album Burning Bridges (2015), which failed to enter the top 10 on the Billboard 200. This House Is Not for Sale (2016) debuted at No. 1 in the US with sales mostly driven by a concert ticket promotion. The album returned to the top spot two years later thanks to another concert tour, as the album was included in the ticket price.

== Albums ==
=== Studio albums ===
List of albums, with selected chart positions and certifications
Title	Album details	Peak chart positions										Sales	Certifications
Title	Album details	US	AUS	AUT	CAN	FIN	GER	NL	SWE	SWI	UK	Sales	Certifications
Bon Jovi	Released: January 21, 1984; Label: Mercury	43	39	—	—	18	—	—	—	—	71		US: Platinum; CAN: Gold; SWI: Gold; UK: Silver
7800° Fahrenheit	Released: March 27, 1985; Label: Mercury	37	30	—	—	6	40	—	10	11	28		US: Platinum; CAN: Platinum; UK: Silver
Slippery When Wet	Released: August 18, 1986; Label: Mercury	1	1	2	1	1	11	5	3	1	6	FIN: 74,564; SWE: 100,000	US: Diamond (15× Platinum); AUS: 6× Platinum; CAN: 10× Platinum; FIN: Platinum; GER: Platinum; NLD: Platinum; NZ: 3× Platinum; SPA: Platinum; SWI: 2× Platinum; UK: 3× Platinum
New Jersey	Released: September 19, 1988; Label: Mercury	1	1	5	3	2	4	13	1	1	1	AUS: 165,000; FIN: 51,126	US: 7× Platinum; AUS: 2× Platinum; AUT: Platinum; CAN: 5× Platinum; FIN: Platinum; GER: Platinum; SWI: Platinum; UK: 2× Platinum
Keep the Faith	Released: November 3, 1992; Label: Mercury	5	1	2	8	1	2	3	3	3	1	US: 1,591,000; AUS: 165,000; FIN: 37,022	US: 2× Platinum; AUS: 3× Platinum; AUT: 2× Platinum; CAN: 5× Platinum; FIN: Gold; GER: Platinum; NLD: Platinum; SWI: 3× Platinum; UK: Platinum
These Days	Released: June 27, 1995; Label: Mercury	9	1	1	1	1	1	1	2	1	1	FIN: 10,203	US: Platinum; AUS: Platinum; AUT: Platinum; CAN: 2× Platinum; FIN: Platinum; GER: Gold; NLD: Platinum; SWI: Platinum; UK: 2× Platinum
Crush	Released: June 13, 2000; Label: Island	9	1	1	4	1	1	1	2	1	1	US: 2,071,000	US: 2× Platinum; AUS: Platinum; AUT: Platinum; CAN: 2× Platinum; FIN: Platinum; GER: 2× Platinum; NLD: Platinum; SWI: 3× Platinum; UK: Platinum
Bounce	Released: October 8, 2002; Label: Island	2	5	3	3	2	2	2	4	2	2		US: Gold; AUS: Gold; AUT: Gold; CAN: Platinum; GER: Platinum; NLD: Gold; SWI: Platinum; UK: Gold
Have a Nice Day	Released: September 20, 2005; Label: Island	2	1	1	1	4	1	1	3	1	2	US: 1,552,000	US: Platinum; AUS: Platinum; AUT: Platinum; CAN: Platinum; SWI: Platinum; UK: Gold
Lost Highway	Released: June 19, 2007; Label: Island	1	2	1	1	3	1	1	4	1	2		US: Platinum; AUS: Gold; AUT: 2× Platinum; CAN: 3× Platinum; GER: Platinum; SWI: Platinum; UK: Gold
The Circle	Released: November 10, 2009; Label: Island	1	4	2	1	6	1	4	9	1	2	US: 566,000	US: Gold; AUS: Gold; CAN: Platinum; GER: Gold; SWI: Gold; UK: Gold
What About Now	Release: March 8, 2013; Label: Island	1	1	1	1	3	2	2	1	3	2		AUS: Gold; AUT: Platinum; CAN: Gold; GER: Gold; UK: Silver
Burning Bridges	Released: August 21, 2015; Label: Mercury	13	3	1	4	9	1	2	25	2	3		AUT: Gold
This House Is Not for Sale	Released: November 4, 2016; Label: Island	1	1	1	3	10	3	8	10	2	5	US: 174,000	AUS: Gold; AUT: Gold; UK: Silver
2020	Released: October 2, 2020; Label: Island	19	3	2	19	24	3	20	3	3	5		
Forever	Released: June 7, 2024; Label: Island	5	4	2	36	29	2	7	—	1	2		
"—" denotes the album failed to chart or was not released.

=== Live albums ===
List of albums, with selected chart positions and certifications
Title	Album details	Peak chart positions										Certifications
Title	Album details	US	AUS	AUT	CAN	FIN	GER	NL	SWE	SWI	UK	Certifications
One Wild Night Live 1985–2001	Released: May 22, 2001; Label: Island	20	6	2	4	4	3	2	7	1	2	AUT: Gold; CAN: Gold; EU: Platinum; GER: Gold; SPA: Platinum; SWI: Platinum; UK: Platinum
Inside Out	Released: November 27, 2012; Label: Island	196	—	—	—	—	—	—	—	—	—	
This House Is Not for Sale – Live from the London Palladium	Released: December 16, 2016; Label: Island	—	—	—	—	—	—	—	—	—	—	
"—" denotes the album failed to chart or was not released.

=== Compilation albums ===
List of albums, with selected chart positions and certifications
Title	Album details	Peak chart positions										Sales	Certifications
Title	Album details	US	AUS	AUT	CAN	FIN	GER	NL	SWE	SWI	UK	Sales	Certifications
Hard & Hot	Released: December 2, 1991; Label: PolyGram; Australian release only	—	—	—	—	—	—	—	—	—	—		
Cross Road	Released: October 10, 1994; Label: Mercury	8	1	1	1	1	1	2	2	1	1	US: 5,000,000	US: 7× Platinum; AUS: 13× Platinum; AUT: 3× Platinum; CAN: 10× Platinum; EU: 8× Platinum; FIN: 2× Platinum; GER: 2× Platinum; NLD: 2× Platinum; SWI: 3× Platinum; UK: 6× Platinum
Tokyo Road: Best of Bon Jovi	Released: March 28, 2001; Label: Universal; Japan release only	—	—	—	—	—	—	—	—	—	—	JPN: 400,000	
This Left Feels Right	Released: November 4, 2003; Label: Island	14	11	2	5	18	3	6	23	3	4		US: Gold; AUT: Gold; CAN: Gold; GER: Platinum; SWI: Gold; UK: Platinum
Greatest Hits	Released: November 29, 2010; Label: Island	5	1	2	1	6	2	3	1	3	2		US: Platinum; AUS: 8× Platinum; EU: Platinum; FIN: Gold; GER: Platinum; NZ: 2× Platinum; SWI: Gold; UK: 5× Platinum

=== Box sets ===
List of albums, with selected chart positions and certifications
Title	Album details	Peak chart positions							Certifications
Title	Album details	US	AUT	CAN	GER	JPN	NL	UK	Certifications
100,000,000 Bon Jovi Fans Can't Be Wrong	Released: November 16, 2004; Label: Island	53	50	48	37	13	40	90	US: Gold

== Extended plays ==
Title	Year	Notes
Live On Tour EP	1987	Released only in Australia where it charted at #21.
Live from Osaka	2000	Reissue available with the bonus version of Crush in Japan and Australasia. Charted at #36 in Japan.
The Love Songs	2001	A very rare bonus CD, available only on Valentine's Day with purchases of the studio album Crush. Contains five Bon Jovi love ballads; "Thank You for Loving Me", "Bed of Roses", "Always", "I'll Be There for You" and "Never Say Goodbye".
Bon Jovi – Target EP	2003	US-only Target exclusively released mini-album with demos and live recordings of tracks from Bounce and Crush era. Only available at Target retail stores for a limited time.
Live from the Have a Nice Day Tour	2006	A six-track live promo album, sold exclusively at Walmart stores in the US.

== Singles ==
=== 1980s ===
Title	Year	Peak chart positions										Certifications	Album
Title	Year	US	AUS	AUT	CAN	GER	IRE	NLD	SWE	SWI	UK	Certifications	Album
"Runaway"	1984	39	—	—	—	23	—	—	—	—	—	US: Platinum; AUS: Gold; NZ: Gold; UK: Silver	Bon Jovi
"She Don't Know Me"	1984	48	—	—	—	—	—	—	—	—	—		Bon Jovi
"Burning for Love"	1984	—	—	—	—	—	—	—	—	—	—		Bon Jovi
"Only Lonely"	1985	54	—	—	—	—	—	—	—	—	—		7800° Fahrenheit
"In and Out of Love"	1985	69	—	—	—	—	—	—	—	—	—		7800° Fahrenheit
"The Hardest Part Is the Night"	1985	—	—	—	—	—	—	—	—	—	68		7800° Fahrenheit
"Silent Night"	1985	—	—	—	—	—	—	—	—	—	—		7800° Fahrenheit
"You Give Love a Bad Name"	1986	1	32	25	2	8	—	2	14	—	14	US: 5× Platinum; AUS: 5× Platinum; CAN: Gold; GER: Gold; ITA: Gold; NZ: 4× Platinum; UK: 2× Platinum	Slippery When Wet
"Livin' on a Prayer"	1986	1	3	—	1	10	20	4	2	12	4	US: Diamond; AUS: 11× Platinum; CAN: Gold; GER: Platinum; JPN: Platinum; ITA: Platinum; NZ: 7× Platinum; UK: 5× Platinum	Slippery When Wet
"Wanted Dead or Alive"	1987	7	13	—	17	—	47	24	—	—	13	US: 6× Platinum; AUS: 4× Platinum; NZ: 2× Platinum; UK: Platinum	Slippery When Wet
"Never Say Goodbye"	1987	—^{[A]}	—	—	—	—	—	59	—	—	21		Slippery When Wet
"Bad Medicine"	1988	1	4	—	5	12	54	10	20	14	17	AUS: Platinum; NZ: Gold; UK: Silver	New Jersey
"Born to Be My Baby"	1988	3	30	—	8	—	54	—	—	25	22	AUS: Gold	New Jersey
"I'll Be There for You"	1989	1	23	—	2	—	67	22	—	15	18	AUS: Platinum; NZ: Gold; UK: Silver	New Jersey
"Lay Your Hands on Me"	1989	7	23	—	17	—	—	47	—	16	18		New Jersey
"Living in Sin"	1989	9	64	—	19	—	—	—	—	20	35		New Jersey
"—" denotes the single failed to chart or was not released. "*" in the absence of RPM data, Canadian figures were taken from Soundscan sales/The Record airplay data.

=== 1990s ===
Title	Year	Peak chart positions										Certifications	Album
Title	Year	US	AUS	AUT	CAN	GER	IRE	NLD	SWE	SWI	UK	Certifications	Album
"Keep the Faith"	1992	29	10	17	5	8	5	9	7	3	5	AUS: Platinum; UK: Silver	Keep the Faith
"Bed of Roses"	1993	10	10	—	2	10	15	9	27	9	13	AUS: 3× Platinum; GER: Gold; NZ: Platinum; UK: Gold	Keep the Faith
"In These Arms"	1993	27	10	20	6	14	10	7	—	23	9	AUS: Platinum; UK: Silver	Keep the Faith
"I'll Sleep When I'm Dead"	1993	97	24	19	47	—	14	17	—	35	17	AUS: Gold	Keep the Faith
"I Believe"	1993	—	40	—	—	49	25	32	—	34	11		Keep the Faith
"Dry County"	1994	—	31	26	—	41	18	19	35	10	9		Keep the Faith
"Always"	1994	4	2	3	1	4	1	2	2	1	2	US: Platinum; AUS: 5× Platinum; AUT: Gold; ITA: Gold; NLD: Gold; NZ: Platinum; SWI: Gold; UK: 2× Platinum	Cross Road
"Please Come Home for Christmas"^{[B]}	1994	—	—	—	—	—	6	—	—	—	7		Non-album single
"Someday I'll Be Saturday Night"	1995	—	10	—	18	37	6	17	—	11	7		Cross Road
"This Ain't a Love Song"	1995	14	4	6	2	9	5	3	12	4	6	AUS: Gold	These Days
"Something for the Pain"	1995	76	14	36	19	51	8	14	33	10	8	AUS: Gold	These Days
"Lie to Me"	1995	88	20	20	20	46	11	16	44	20	10	AUS: Gold	These Days
"These Days"	1996	—	38	—	—	61	22	45	—	31	7		These Days
"Hey God"	1996	—	—	—	44	—	21	27	—	—	13		These Days
"Real Life"	1999	—	52	17	52	17	—	36	—	22	21		EDtv soundtrack
"—" denotes the single failed to chart or not released

=== 2000s ===
Title	Year	Peak chart positions										Certifications	Album
Title	Year	US	AUS	AUT	CAN	GER	IRE	NLD	SWE	SWI	UK	Certifications	Album
"It's My Life"	2000	33	5	1	17	2	5	1	2	1	3	US: 3× Platinum; AUS: 6× Platinum; AUT: Platinum; GER: Platinum; ITA: Platinum; JPN: Gold; NLD: Gold; NZ: 3× Platinum; SWI: Platinum; UK: 2× Platinum	Crush
"Say It Isn't So"	2000	—	9	22	—	35	16	24	35	58	10	AUS: Gold	Crush
"Thank You for Loving Me"	2000	57	34	14	—	25	19	24	46	26	12	AUS: Gold	Crush
"One Wild Night"	2001	—	35	19	—	25	21	17	32	31	10		One Wild Night Live 1985–2001
"Wanted Dead or Alive (Live)"	2001	—	—	—	—	45	—	26	—	—	—		One Wild Night Live 1985–2001
"Everyday"	2002	118	5	9	1	7	11	6	6	6	5	AUS: Gold	Bounce
"Misunderstood"	2002	106	33	37	19	35	37	27	39	57	21		Bounce
"Bounce"	2002	—	—	—	—	—	—	—	—	—	—		Bounce
"The Distance"	2003	—	—	—	—	—	—	—	—	—	—		Bounce
"All About Lovin' You"	2003	—	31	27	—	21	16	17	38	33	9		Bounce
"It's My Life (2003)"	2003	—	—	17	—	45	—	16	—	—	—		This Left Feels Right
"Have a Nice Day"	2005	53	8	7	7	7	18	5	2	10	6	US: Gold; AUS: Platinum	Have a Nice Day
"Welcome to Wherever You Are"	2005	—	—	36	—	40	23	25	—	46	19		Have a Nice Day
"Who Says You Can't Go Home" (solo or with Jennifer Nettles)	2006	23	—	36	—	54	30	33	—	57	5		Have a Nice Day
"(You Want To) Make a Memory"	2007	27	—	3	4	5	—	9	—	5	33	US: Gold	Lost Highway
"Lost Highway"	2007	—	—	41	39	36	—	—	—	—	117		Lost Highway
"Till We Ain't Strangers Anymore" (featuring LeAnn Rimes)	2007	123	—	—	—	39	—	—	—	—	—		Lost Highway
"Summertime"	2007	—	—	—	39	—	—	—	—	—	—		Lost Highway
"Whole Lot of Leavin'"	2008	—	—	22	—	41	—	—	—	—	—		Lost Highway
"We Weren't Born to Follow"	2009	68	62	4	29	6	41	73	30	14	25	AUS: Gold	The Circle
"—" denotes the single failed to chart or not released

=== 2010s ===
Title	Year	Peak chart positions										Certifications	Album
Title	Year	US Bub.	AUS	AUT	CAN	FIN	GER	IRE	NLD	SWI	UK	Certifications	Album
"Superman Tonight"	2010	—	—	44	—	—	26	—	—	—	—		The Circle
"When We Were Beautiful"	2010	—	—	—	—	—	—	—	—	—	—		The Circle
"What Do You Got?"	2010	2	—	30	23	—	23	—	—	—	127		Greatest Hits
"No Apologies"	2011	—	—	—	—	—	—	—	—	—	—		Greatest Hits
"This Is Our House"	2011	—	—	—	—	—	—	—	—	—	—		Greatest Hits
"Because We Can"	2013	6	56	21	37	14	37	55	36	34	38		What About Now
"What About Now"	2013	—	—	—	—	—	—	—	—	—	—		What About Now
"We Don't Run"	2015	—	—	—	—	—	—	—	—	—	—		Burning Bridges
"Saturday Night Gave Me Sunday Morning"	2015	—	—	54	—	—	98	—	—	—	—		Burning Bridges
"This House Is Not for Sale"	2016	—	81	43	—	—	85	—	—	—	130		This House Is Not for Sale
"Knockout"	2016	—	—	—	—	—	—	—	—	—	—		This House Is Not for Sale
"Labor of Love"	2016	—	—	—	—	—	—	—	—	—	—		This House Is Not for Sale
"Born Again Tomorrow"	2016	—	—	—	—	—	—	—	—	—	—		This House Is Not for Sale
"When We Were Us"	2018	—	—	—	—	—	—	—	—	—	—		This House Is Not for Sale (Reissue)
"Walls"	2018	—	—	—	—	—	—	—	—	—	—		This House Is Not for Sale (Reissue)
"Unbroken"	2019	—	—^{[C]}	—	—	—	—	—	—	—	—		2020
"—" denotes the single failed to chart or not released

=== 2020s ===
Title	Year	Peak chart positions						Album
Title	Year	US AC	US Adult Pop	US Rock Dig.	CAN Dig.	JPN Over.	UK Singles Sales Chart	Album
"Limitless"	2020	10	—	—	—	—	91	2020
"Unbroken" (featuring the Invictus Games Choir)	2020	—	—	—	—	—	41	Non-album single
"American Reckoning"	2020	—	—	—	—	—	—	2020
"Do What You Can" (solo or featuring Jennifer Nettles)	2020	11	—	5	—	—	—	2020
"Story of Love"	2021	13	—	—	—	—	—	2020
"Christmas Isn't Christmas"	2023	—	—	15	—	—	24	Non-album single
"Legendary"	2024	9	15	8	21	—	27	Forever
"Living Proof"	2024	—	23	—	—	—	34	Forever
"Now or Never" (with Pitbull)	2024	26	11	—	—	—	—	Pitcoin
"Red, White and Jersey"	2025	—	27	—	—	3	—	Forever (Legendary Edition)
"—" denotes the single failed to chart or not released

=== Other singles ===
Title	Year	Notes
"Breakout"	1984	An EP/single featuring a live and studio version of "Breakout" along with a live version of "Runaway".
"The Price of Love"	1985	A promo single released in Japan.
"Borderline"	1986	An EP/single released alongside "Livin' on a Prayer" in Japan.
"Let It Rock"	1986	From the 1986 album Slippery When Wet. Single released as a 12" vinyl for promotional use only in UK.
"I Wish Everyday Could Be Like Christmas"	1993	Originally released as the B-side to the single "Keep the Faith" in 1992 and was included also as a B-side to the single "Please Come Home for Christmas". Since then, the song has been re-released as a holiday single in 1993, 2002 and 2011. The proceeds of the single go to the Special Olympics.
"Cama De Rosas"	1993	The Spanish version of "Bed of Roses". Was released as a promo CD in both Spain and Mexico. It appears on some international versions of the studio album Keep the Faith.
"Good Guys Don't Always Wear White"	1994	From the 1994 soundtrack The Cowboy Way. Also appears as a B-side to the single "Someday I'll Be Saturday Night" and on the 100,000,000 Bon Jovi Fans Can't Be Wrong box set. As well as appearing on The Cowboy Way soundtrack it was intended to be the lead single for the band's 1994 Best Of album 'Cross Road' but was pulled from the compilation and only released as a single-track promotional CD in the US. The song features a music video.
"Wedding Day"	1995	Originally appears as a B-side to the single "This Ain't a Love Song". Released as a promo CD only in Germany.
"Como Yo Nadie Te Ha Amado"	1995	The Spanish version of "This Ain't a Love Song". It was released as a promo CD in Mexico and the US. Also appears on some South American versions of the studio album These Days.
"Save the World"	2000	From the 2000 studio album Crush. Released as a single-track promo CD in Japan.
"Tokyo Road (Live)"	2001	Promo single released only in Japan to promote the Japan-only released compilation album Tokyo Road: Best of Bon Jovi. It was also included as a bonus disc on a limited edition of the album. The live version of "Tokyo Road" would later appear on the 2010 Special Edition of 7800° Fahrenheit.
"Wanted Dead or Alive (2003)"	2003	"Wanted Dead or Alive (2003)" was released as a promo single in various countries.
"Keep the Faith (2003 version)"	2003	The version of "Keep the Faith" from This Left Feels Right was released as a promo single in Spain.
"I Want to Be Loved"	2005	From the 2005 album Have a Nice Day. Was released as a single-track promo CD in the US.
"Work for the Working Man"	2009	From the 2009 studio album The Circle. Was released as a single-track promo CD in the Netherlands.
"We Weren't Born to Follow" / "Who Says You Can't Go Home" / "Livin' On a Prayer"	2010	Live at the 52nd Grammy Awards; released as a medley via iTunes. "Who Says You Can't Go Home" was performed as a duet with Jennifer Nettles.
"Roller Coaster"	2016	Promo single from the album This House Is Not for Sale; Peaked at number 11 on the Billboard Adult Contemporary chart and number 34 on the Adult Pop Airplay chart.

== Other charted songs ==
Title	Year	Peak chart positions				Album
Title	Year	US Airplay	AUT	JPN	UK	Album
"Edge of a Broken Heart"	1987	38	—	—	—	Disorderlies OST
"The Radio Saved My Life Tonight" (promo single)	2004	—	—	37	—	100,000,000 Bon Jovi Fans Can't Be Wrong
"Hallelujah" (live)	2008	—	29	—	177	Lost Highway [single]
"The More Things Change"	2011	—	37	—	—	Greatest Hits (Ultimate Collection)
"—" denotes the single was not released.

Notes

- A As it had not been issued as a retail-available single in the US, "Never Say Goodbye" was not eligible to chart on the Billboard Hot 100; however, it peaked at number 28 on the Hot 100 Airplay chart.
- B "Please Come Home for Christmas" was originally credited as a solo recording by Jon Bon Jovi when included on the Christmas compilation A Very Special Christmas 2 in 1992, but when released as a single in the UK, Ireland and Europe in 1994 it was released under the band name.
- C "Unbroken" did not enter the ARIA Singles Chart, but peaked at number 35 on the ARIA Digital Track Chart.

== Videos ==
=== Live performances ===
Year	Title	Certifications
1985	Tokyo Road: Live in Japan '85: Released: 1985; Label: Toshiba; Formats: VHS/LD	—
1993	Keep the Faith: An Evening with Bon Jovi: Released: February 1993; Label: Mercury	—
1995	Live From London: Released: November 1995; Label: Universal	US: Gold; UK: 2× Platinum
2000	The Crush Tour: Released: December 4, 2000; Label: Mercury	US: Platinum; AUS: Platinum; BRA Gold; UK: 2× Platinum
2003	This Left Feels Right Live: Released: February 10, 2004; Label: Island	AUS: Gold; BRA Gold; UK: Platinum
2007	Lost Highway: The Concert: Released: November 23, 2007; Label: Universal	US: Platinum; CAN: 5× Platinum; AUS: Platinum; UK: Gold
2009	Live at Madison Square Garden: Released: November 20, 2009; Label: Island	AUS: Platinum; UK: Gold
"—" denotes the video did not reach gold or platinum status.

=== Video collections ===
Year	Title	Certifications
1985	Breakout: Video Singles: Released: 1985; Label: Polygram	US: Platinum
1987	Slippery When Wet: The Videos: Released: 1987; Label: Mercury	US: 2× Platinum; CAN: Platinum
1989	New Jersey: The Videos: Released: 1989; Label: Polygram	US: Platinum; CAN: Gold
1994	Keep the Faith: The Videos: Released: 1994; Label: Mercury	US: Gold
1994	Cross Road: The Videos: Released: 1994; Label: Mercury	US: Gold
2010	Greatest Hits - The Ultimate Video Collection: Released: November 2010; Label: Island	AUS: 3× Platinum; BRA Gold

=== Documentaries ===
Year	Title	Certification
1990	Access All Areas: A Rock & Roll Odyssey: Released: May 20, 1990; Label: Mercury	US: Gold
2009	When We Were Beautiful: Released: November 2009 (in cinemas); Label: Mercury	—
2024	Thank You, Goodnight: The Bon Jovi Story: Released: April 26, 2024 (on Hulu (US), and Disney+ (worldwide))	—
"—" denotes the video is ineligible for certification.

=== Music videos ===
Year	Title	Label	Director
1984	"Runaway"	Mercury	Michael Cuesta
1984	"She Don't Know Me"	Mercury	Martin Kahan
1985	"In and Out of Love"	Mercury	Martin Kahan
1985	"Only Lonely"	Mercury	Jack Cole
1985	"Silent Night"	Mercury	Marcelo Epstein
1986	"You Give Love a Bad Name"	Mercury	Wayne Isham
1986	"Livin' on a Prayer"	Mercury	Wayne Isham
1987	"Wanted Dead or Alive"	Mercury	Wayne Isham
1987	"Never Say Goodbye"	Mercury	Wayne Isham
1987	"Wild in the Streets"	Mercury	Wayne Isham
1988	"Bad Medicine" (original version)	Mercury	Wayne Isham
1988	"Bad Medicine" (fan-recorded version)	Mercury	Wayne Isham
1988	"Born to Be My Baby"	Mercury	Wayne Isham
1989	"I'll Be There for You"	Mercury	Wayne Isham
1989	"Lay Your Hands on Me"	Mercury	Wayne Isham
1989	"Living in Sin"	Mercury	Wayne Isham
1989	"Blood on Blood"	Mercury	Wayne Isham
1992	"Keep the Faith"	Mercury	Phil Joanou
1992	"Bed of Roses" (short, extended and alternate versions)	Mercury	
1993	"In These Arms"	Mercury	Wayne Isham
1993	"I'll Sleep When I'm Dead"	Mercury	Troy Smith
1993	"I Believe"	Mercury	Nick Egan
1994	"If I Was Your Mother"	Mercury	Wayne Isham
1994	"Dry County"	Mercury	Nick Egan
1994	"Always" (original and alternate versions)	Mercury	Marty Callner
1994	"Please Come Home for Christmas"	Mercury	Herb Ritts
1994	"Someday I'll Be Saturday Night"	Mercury	Wayne Isham
1995	"Good Guys Don't Always Wear White"	Mercury	Wayne Isham
1995	"This Ain't a Love Song" (original and alternate version)	Mercury	Andy Morahan
1995	"Something for the Pain"	Mercury	Marty Callner
1995	"Lie to Me" (original, alternate, extended and director's cut versions)	Mercury	Marty Callner
1996	"These Days" (original and alternate version)	Mercury	Steven Kirlys
1996	"Hey God" (short and extended versions)	Mercury	Matt Mahurin
1999	"Real Life"^{[D]}	Mercury	Wayne Isham
2000	"It's My Life"	Island	Wayne Isham
2000	"Say It Isn't So"	Island	Wayne Isham
2000	"Thank You for Loving Me"	Island	Wayne Isham
2001	"One Wild Night"	Island	Nancy Bardawil
2002	"Everyday"	Island	Todd Kellstein
2002	"Misunderstood"	Island	Marc Klasfeld
2003	"All About Lovin' You"	Island	Marc Klasfeld
2003	"The Right Side of Wrong"	Island	
2003	"Wanted Dead or Alive 2003" (also 2001 live version)^{[E]}	Island	Anthony M. Bongiovi
2005	"Have a Nice Day"	Island	Eric Hirshberg
2005	"Who Says You Can't Go Home" (original version)	Island	Jeff Labbe
2005	"Who Says You Can't Go Home" (Jennifer Nettles version)	Island	Anthony M. Bongiovi
2006	"Welcome to Wherever You Are"	Island	Wayne Isham
2007	"(You Want to) Make a Memory"	Island	Kevin Kerslake
2007	"Till We Ain't Strangers Anymore"	Island	Phil Griffin
2007	"Lost Highway"	Island	Anthony M. Bongiovi
2008	"Whole Lot of Leavin'"	Island	Phil Griffin
2009	"We Weren't Born to Follow"	Island	Craig Barry
2010	"Superman Tonight"	Island	Phil Griffin
2010	"When We Were Beautiful"	Island	Anthony M. Bongiovi
2010	"What Do You Got?"	Island	Wayne Isham
2010	"This Is Our House"	Island	Anthony M. Bongiovi
2011	"No Apologies"	Island	Anthony M. Bongiovi
2013	"Because We Can" (original, The Boxer : Act 1, Astrid : Act 2 and The Beginning: Epilogue version)	Island	Fisher Stevens
2013	"What About Now"	Island	Anthony M. Bongiovi
2016	"This House Is Not for Sale"	Island	Indrani Pal-Chaudhuri
2016	"Knockout"	Island	Alex Howard
2016	"Labor of Love"	Island	Frank Borin and Ivanna Borin
2016	"Come On Up to Our House"	Island	Alex Howard
2016	"Scars on This Guitar"	Island	Alex Howard
2016	"The Devil's in the Temple"	Island	Alex Howard
2016	"Roller Coaster"	Island	Alex Howard
2016	"Born Again Tomorrow"	Island	Frank Borin and Ivanna Borin
2016	"New Year's Day"	Island	Alex Howard
2017	"God Bless This Mess"	Island	Alex Howard
2017	"Living With the Ghost"	Island	Casey Stein, Kate Branom & Nathan Podshadley
2017	"Reunion"	Island	Casey Stein, Kate Branom & Nathan Podshadley
2017	"Spiritual Warfare"	Island	
2018	"When We Were Us"	Island	Matt Barnes
2018	"Walls"	Island	Matt Barnes
2019	"Unbroken"	Island	
2020	"Limitless"	Island	Marc Klasfeld
2020	"Do What You Can" (original version and with Jennifer Nettles version)	Island	
2021	"Story of Love"	Island	
2024	"Legendary"	Island	Dano Cerny
2025	"Red, White and Jersey"	Island	Gil Green

Notes

- D "Real Life" features all band members except David Bryan who was absent due to a serious hand injury.
- E "Wanted Dead or Alive 2003" was a reused music video from the promo single "Wanted Dead or Alive Live" from 2001. It was slightly reworked to match the reworked music of the song.

== See also ==
- Jon Bon Jovi discography
- Richie Sambora discography
- David Bryan discography
- List of Bon Jovi songs
- List of best-selling music artists
- List of best-selling Western artists in Japan
- List of best-selling albums
- List of best-selling albums in Australia
- List of best-selling albums in the United States
- List of artists who reached number one in the United States
