= Lost Highway Tour =

2007–08 concert tour by Bon Jovi

- World tour by Bon Jovi
- Poster to the concerts in Oceania
- Location: North America, Asia, Oceania, Europe
- Associated album: Lost Highway
- Start date: October 25, 2007
- End date: July 15, 2008
- Legs: 7
- No. of shows: 99 in Total
- Box office: US $210.7 million ($315.07 in 2025 dollars)

Bon Jovi concert chronology
- Have a Nice Day Tour (2005–2006); Lost Highway Tour (2007–2008); The Circle Tour (2010)

The Lost Highway Tour was a worldwide concert tour by American rock band Bon Jovi in support of their 10th studio album, Lost Highway. It took place from October 2007 to July 2008. Originally planned as a 2008 greatest hits tour, the tour was changed to promote Lost Highway after the album's worldwide success, reaching No. 1 in several countries when released in June 2007.

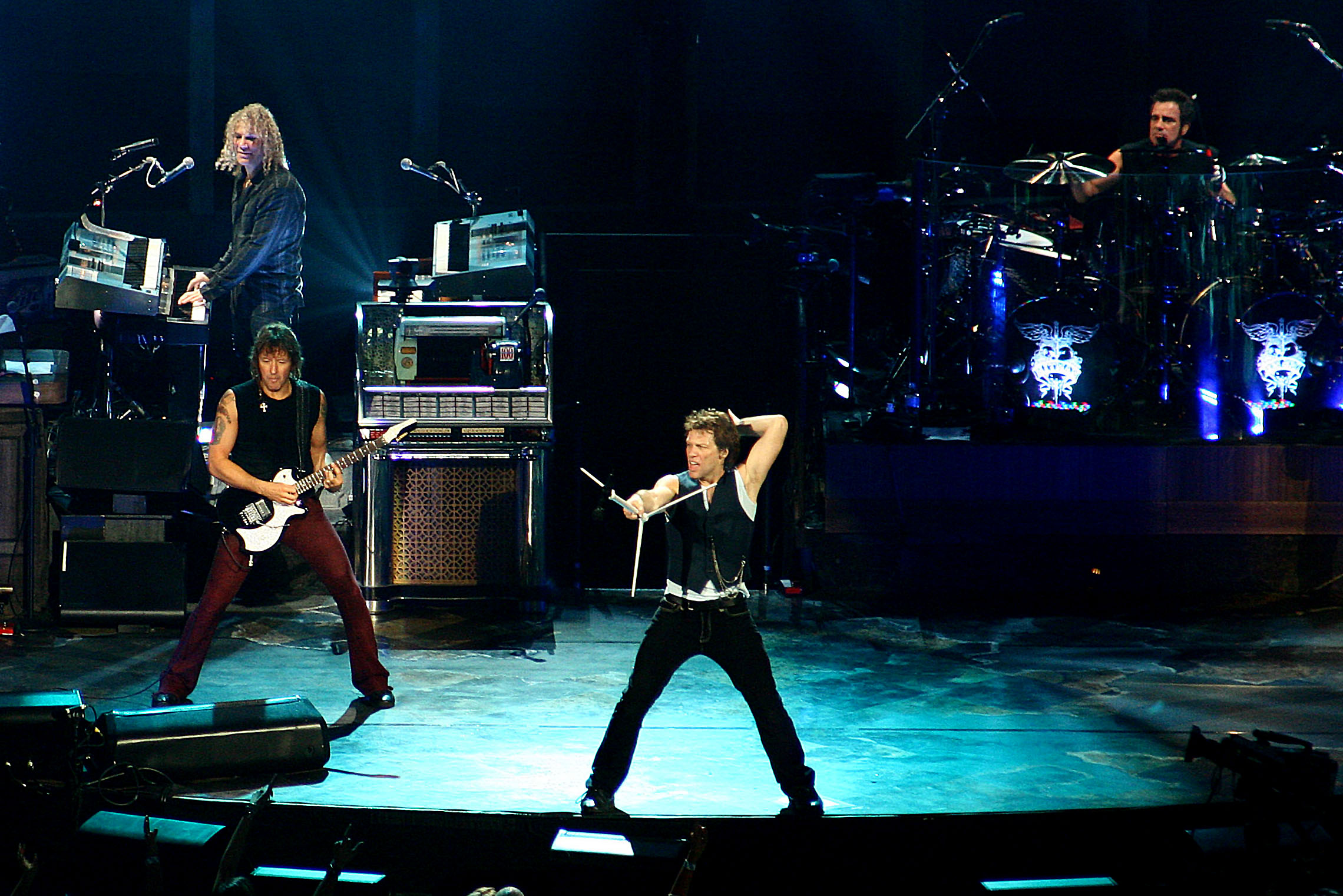
Bon Jovi performing in 2008

Immediately after the album's release, the band performed a string of promotional summer concerts in the United States, Canada, Puerto Rico, United Kingdom and Japan. The tour began proper in October 2007 with ten concerts that would mark the opening of New Jersey's Prudential Center, before doing a tour of Canada and then tours of Japan, Australasia, the United States and Europe in 2008. Bon Jovi also played their first concert in New Zealand in 12 years as part of the tour.

The Lost Highway Tour is a finalist for the Billboard 2008 Touring Awards for Top Tour, Top Draw, and Top Manager.

== Background ==
During the opening concert in Prudential Center in Newark, New Jersey on October 25, 2007, Jon Bon Jovi announced that the band was starting a world tour with 10 shows in Prudential Center. The next day, record company Island confirmed through official press release on their web site Jon's statement and also announcing that band will visit Canada, United States, Japan, New Zealand, England, Ireland, Scotland, Germany, the Netherlands, Austria, among other countries. Label also announced dates for Canadian, Japanese and United States concerts on same day. Jon's world tour announcement, interview and concert footage was available for free to the media to download at 12:01 AM EST on Friday, October 26, 2007, through Bon Jovi's profile on The NewsMarket's official website. To mark the launch of the world tour, video album Lost Highway: The Concert (2007) was screened in over 100 movie theaters for one night only on November 6, 2007. MaxMouth has partnered with AEG Live to produce the premier Web TV series "On the Road with Bon Jovi" and filmed all Bon Jovi concerts in Prudential Center in Newark from October 25 to November 11, 2007. They released five webisodes that premiered independently on several biggest web portals, including maxmouth.com. "On the Road with Bon Jovi" also included exclusive interviews and performances by My Chemical Romance, Big & Rich, Gretchen Wilson, Daughtry and All American Rejects, who appeared as supporting acts during 10 night stands. Once each webisode premiered, it was reverted to Bon Jovi's official website and remained inside custom co-branded MaxMouth & Bon Jovi video player.

Bon Jovi also performed for the first time in Australia since 1995. Tickets for Australian concerts went on sale in morning of November 15, 2007, and tickets for Sydney and Melbourne were sold in couple of minutes. Due to the overwhelming demand, second and final show was added at Sydney's Acer Arena on January 22, 2008. Since three concerts at Air Canada Centre on December 6, 2007, December 7, 2007, and March 10, 2008, quickly sold out, Bon Jovi also added a fourth concert for March 12, 2008 and fifth for March 13, 2008, making them the first act to ever play five concerts on the same tour at Air Canada Centre.

The band was scheduled to begin rehearsals at the NIU Convocation Center of the Northern Illinois University the same day that gunman Steven Kazmierczak opened fire on campus, killing five students, wounding 21 others, and subsequently killing himself. The band canceled the rehearsals and Jon Bon Jovi conveyed sympathies for the victims.

== Tour highlights ==
The Lost Highway Tour has seen the band perform songs rarely heard live since the These Days Tour, for example "Hey God", "I Believe", "Lie to Me", "This Ain't a Love Song" and "Always" in its original version. At several of the band's summer stadium shows, the band was known to play extremely long setlists, some of them running nearly three hours, totaling approximately 26 songs, including encores that sometimes had as much as seven songs.

The band also spontaneously played "Stick to Your Guns", from the New Jersey album for the first time in twenty years at the Amsterdam gig, after Jon Bon Jovi noticed seventeen banners held up in the front row with the lyrics to the song printed on them. The band played at Rock in Rio in Lisbon on May 31, 2008, making it their first concert in Portugal since 1995. The band played a free concert in Central Park, New York City, to 60,000 fans in conjunction with Major League Baseball and Bank of America, as part of MLB All Star Game week.

Lead guitarist Richie Sambora took the lead for one song at most shows with either "I'll Be There for You", "These Days" and occasionally "Stranger in This Town". Keyboardist David Bryan also sang solo very rarely with "In These Arms", on which rhythm guitarist Bobby Bandiera also took the lead guitar solo.

Bon Jovi have also performed "Dry County" frequently.

It has also been announced both during concert and on the official band website that a live DVD from the last two nights of the tour at Madison Square Garden will be released.

Before the band was set to perform at the Bank Atlantic Center in Fort Lauderdale, Florida, there was a bomb threat at the stadium. The band finally took the stage at about 9:00 p.m.

A fan jumped on top of Jon at the concert at Punchestown in Ireland just before the bridge of "In These Arms", and it took four security guards to take her off.

== Set list ==
1. “Lost Highway”
2. “Born to Be My Baby”
3. “You Give Love a Bad Name”
4. “Summertime”
5. “Raise Your Hands”
6. “Runaway”
7. “I'll Sleep When I'm Dead/Jumpin' Jack Flash”
8. “Whole Lot of Leavin'”
9. In These Arms
10. Any Other Day
11. We Got It Going On
12. It's My Life
13. Keep the Faith
14. I'll Be There for You (Richie Sambora on lead vocals)
15. (You Want To) Make a Memory
16. Someday I'll Be Saturday Night
17. Blaze of Glory
18. Who Says You Can't Go Home
19. Have a Nice Day
20. Bad Medicine/Shout
21. Livin' on a Prayer

Encore:

22. Hallelujah
23. Wanted Dead or Alive
24. I Love This Town

== Personnel ==
Bon Jovi

- Jon Bon Jovi – lead vocals, acoustic guitar, rhythm guitar, maracas, tambourine
- Richie Sambora – lead guitar, talk box, backing vocals, co-lead vocals on "I'll Be There for You"
- David Bryan – keyboards, backing vocals
- Tico Torres – drums, percussion

Additional personnel

- Hugh McDonald – bass, backing vocals
- Bobby Bandiera – rhythm guitar, backing vocals
- Lorenza Ponce – violin, viola, tambourine, backing vocals
- Kurt Johnston – pedal steel guitar, banjo, mandolin, Dobro, backing vocals

== Tour grossings ==
The first 22 shows grossed 41.4 million dollars, placing their tour at No. 11 on the list for top-grossing tours of 2007. The band's second North American leg of 38 shows grossed $56.3 million in ticket sales according to Pollstar making it the number one concert draw in North America for the first half of 2008. Bon Jovi's 10-night run to open the new Prudential Center in Newark, New Jersey was the No. 1 Grossing event in 2007 and the No. 6 Grossing event "of all time" in North America. The band's 5-night stand at Toronto's Air Canada Centre set the record for the most number of shows in one tour at that venue, beating the previous record of 4 held by the band, as well as U2, The Spice Girls, and The Police. The third leg of the tour the band played to over 966,000 fans. On the fourth leg of Europe they played to over 1 million concert goers in 22 shows. The combined gross of the tour's first, second and third legs was $129 million, with $16.4 million from the Newark shows and $112.4 million from the remaining shows placing them first on Billboards midyear touring chart.

The tour was the highest-grossing tour of 2008 in Billboard's rankings. The tour grossed $210,650,974 and sold 2,157,675 tickets in total. In Pollstar's calculus for North America, the Lost Highway Tour had the fifth-highest gross for 2008 at $70.4 million.

== Supporting acts ==
For the run at the Prudential Center in New Jersey, the support acts were My Chemical Romance, Big & Rich, Gretchen Wilson, Daughtry, and The All-American Rejects, with each support act playing two of the ten dates. Hedley opened for Bon Jovi during the Canadian leg of the tour, forcing them to postpone their headlining Canadian tour until early 2008. Daughtry opened for Bon Jovi during the second North American leg of the tour. The Feeling supported Bon Jovi at four of the summer dates in the United Kingdom, with Biffy Clyro supporting on the first night at Twickenham. Kid Rock and Razorlight opened for Bon Jovi at Punchestown, Ireland, with local Irish band DC Tempest. Switchblade opened for Bon Jovi in Bristol, UK. In Australia, local bands Front Counter (Melbourne), OohLaLa (Sydney), and The Violet Flames (Perth) won the support slot through a radio contest. New Zealand band The Valves were the support act in Christchurch

== Tour dates ==
Date	City	Country	Venue	Attendance	Revenue
North America
October 25, 2007	Newark	United States	Prudential Center	138,322 / 140,000	$16,379,070
October 26, 2007	Newark	United States	Prudential Center	138,322 / 140,000	$16,379,070
October 28, 2007	Newark	United States	Prudential Center	138,322 / 140,000	$16,379,070
October 30, 2007	Newark	United States	Prudential Center	138,322 / 140,000	$16,379,070
November 1, 2007	Newark	United States	Prudential Center	138,322 / 140,000	$16,379,070
November 3, 2007	Newark	United States	Prudential Center	138,322 / 140,000	$16,379,070
November 4, 2007	Newark	United States	Prudential Center	138,322 / 140,000	$16,379,070
November 7, 2007	Newark	United States	Prudential Center	138,322 / 140,000	$16,379,070
November 9, 2007	Newark	United States	Prudential Center	138,322 / 140,000	$16,379,070
November 10, 2007	Newark	United States	Prudential Center	138,322 / 140,000	$16,379,070
November 14, 2007	Montreal	Canada	Bell Centre	31,525 / 31,525	$3,246,160
November 15, 2007	Montreal	Canada	Bell Centre	31,525 / 31,525	$3,246,160
November 17, 2007	Ottawa	Canada	Scotiabank Place	—	—
November 19, 2007	London	Canada	John Labatt Centre	9,762 / 9,762	$1,173,749
December 6, 2007	Toronto	Canada	Air Canada Centre	—	—
December 7, 2007	Toronto	Canada	Air Canada Centre	—	—
December 9, 2007	Winnipeg	Canada	MTS Centre	—	—
December 10, 2007	Saskatoon	Canada	Credit Union Centre	—	—
December 12, 2007	Edmonton	Canada	Rexall Place	—	—
December 13, 2007	Calgary	Canada	Pengrowth Saddledome	—	—
December 15, 2007	Vancouver	Canada	General Motors Place	31,143 / 31,143	$2,963,969
December 16, 2007	Vancouver	Canada	General Motors Place	31,143 / 31,143	$2,963,969
Japan
January 11, 2008	Nagoya	Japan	Nagoya Dome	12,113 / 12,113	$1,061,623
January 13, 2008	Tokyo	Japan	Tokyo Dome	60,549 / 60,549	$5,272,912
January 14, 2008	Tokyo	Japan	Tokyo Dome	60,549 / 60,549	$5,272,912
January 16, 2008	Osaka	Japan	Osaka Dome	23,426 / 23,426	$2,052,026
Oceania
January 19, 2008	Melbourne	Australia	Sidney Myer Music Bowl	13,147 / 13,147	$1,829,807
January 21, 2008	Sydney	Australia	Acer Arena	35,632 / 35,632	$4,162,237
January 22, 2008	Sydney	Australia	Acer Arena	35,632 / 35,632	$4,162,237
January 25, 2008	Perth	Australia	Subiaco Oval	28,790 / 28,790	$3,300,500
January 27, 2008	Christchurch	New Zealand	AMI Stadium	29,526 / 33,271	$3,465,730
North America
February 18, 2008	Omaha	United States	Qwest Center	16,977 / 16,977	$1,271,660
February 20, 2008	Auburn Hills	United States	The Palace of Auburn Hills	19,743/ 19,743	$1,661,602
February 21, 2008	Milwaukee	United States	Bradley Center	17,076 / 17,076	$1,352,436
February 23, 2008	Chicago	United States	United Center	54,818 / 54,818	$4,893,109
February 24, 2008	Chicago	United States	United Center	54,818 / 54,818	$4,893,109
February 26, 2008	Chicago	United States	United Center	54,818 / 54,818	$4,893,109
February 28, 2008	Washington, D.C.	United States	Verizon Center	18,255 / 18,255	$1,674,063
March 2, 2008	Philadelphia	United States	Wachovia Center	37,440 / 37,440	$3,253,717
March 3, 2008	Philadelphia	United States	Wachovia Center	37,440 / 37,440	$3,253,717
March 5, 2008	Pittsburgh	United States	Mellon Arena	30,475 / 30,475	$2,295,530
March 7, 2008	Uncasville	United States	Mohegan Sun Arena	18,791 / 18,791	$2,349,195
March 8, 2008	Uncasville	United States	Mohegan Sun Arena	18,791 / 18,791	$2,349,195
March 10, 2008	Toronto	Canada	Air Canada Centre	56,011 / 56,011	$5,614,674
March 12, 2008	Toronto	Canada	Air Canada Centre	56,011 / 56,011	$5,614,674
March 13, 2008	Toronto	Canada	Air Canada Centre	56,011 / 56,011	$5,614,674
March 15, 2008	Pittsburgh	United States	Mellon Arena	(look above)	(look above)
March 16, 2008	Greensboro	United States	Greensboro Coliseum	22,115 / 22,115	$1,295,963
March 18, 2008	Saint Paul	United States	Xcel Energy Center	32,733 / 32,733	$2,987,235
March 19, 2008	Saint Paul	United States	Xcel Energy Center	32,733 / 32,733	$2,987,235
March 31, 2008	Denver	United States	Pepsi Center	16,738 / 16,738	$1,386,228
April 2, 2008	San Jose	United States	HP Pavilion at San Jose	28,343 / 28,343	$2,358,420
April 4, 2008	Anaheim	United States	Honda Center	32,131 / 32,131	$2,456,470
April 5, 2008	Anaheim	United States	Honda Center	32,131 / 32,131	$2,456,470
April 8, 2008	San Jose	United States	HP Pavilion at San Jose	(look above)	(look above)
April 9, 2008	Los Angeles	United States	Staples Center	16,205 / 16,205	$1,515,282
April 11, 2008	Glendale	United States	Jobing.com Arena	16,852 / 16,852	$1,478,803
April 12, 2008	Las Vegas	United States	MGM Grand Garden Arena	15,063 / 15,063	$2,230,573
April 14, 2008	Dallas	United States	American Airlines Center	17,076 / 17,076	$1,537,464
April 15, 2008	Oklahoma City	United States	Ford Center	15,811 / 15,811	$1,152,442
April 17, 2008	Kansas City	United States	Sprint Center	32,131 / 32,131	$2,456,470
April 19, 2008	Fargo	United States	Fargodome	25,065 / 25,065	$1,575,979
April 20, 2008	Des Moines	United States	Wells Fargo Arena	15,277 / 15,277	$1,173,472
April 22, 2008	Kansas City	United States	Sprint Center	(look above)	(look above)
April 24, 2008	Nashville	United States	Sommet Center	16,420 / 16,420	$1,502,217
April 26, 2008	Sunrise	United States	BankAtlantic Center	18,307 / 18,307	$1,554,550
April 27, 2008	Tampa	United States	St. Pete Times Forum	18,061 / 18,061	$1,501,956
April 30, 2008	Atlanta	United States	Philips Arena	32,964 / 32,964	$2,851,856
May 1, 2008	Atlanta	United States	Philips Arena	32,964 / 32,964	$2,851,856
UAE / Europe
May 20, 2008	Abu Dhabi	United Arab Emirates	Emirates Palace	15,291 / 15,291	$1,714,313
May 22, 2008	Gelsenkirchen	Germany	Veltins-Arena	38,918 / 38,918	$3,350,126
May 24, 2008	Munich	Germany	Olympiastadion	70,473 / 70,473	$6,089,353
May 25, 2008	Leipzig	Germany	Zentralstadion	34,084 / 34,084	$2,837,203
May 28, 2008	Hamburg	Germany	HSH Nordbank Arena	28,947 / 28,947	$2,392,643
May 29, 2008	Stuttgart	Germany	Gottlieb-Daimler-Stadion	36,768 / 36,768	$2,952,905
May 31, 2008	Lisbon	Portugal	Rock in Rio Lisboa	48,831 / 48,831	$3,993,759
June 1, 2008	Barcelona	Spain	Estadi Olímpic Lluís Companys	46,255 / 46,255	$4,046,421
June 3, 2008	Frankfurt	Germany	Commerzbank-Arena	37,187 / 37,187	$2,985,360
June 4, 2008	Ebreichsdorf	Austria	Magna Racino	47,598 / 47,598	$4,397,906
June 7, 2008	Kildare	Ireland	Punchestown Racecourse	46,171 / 46,171	$4,729,571
June 11, 2008	Southampton	England	St. Mary's Stadium	30,284 / 30,284	$2,669,609
June 13, 2008	Amsterdam	Netherlands	Amsterdam Arena	34,512 / 34,512	$2,817,625
June 14, 2008	Brussels	Belgium	King Baudouin Stadium	31,041 / 31,041	$2,517,796
June 16, 2008	Helsinki	Finland	Olympiastadion	44,376 / 44,376	$4,594,027
June 18, 2008	Oslo	Norway	Ullevaal Stadion	30,612 / 30,612	$3,399,884
June 19, 2008	Auning	Denmark	Gammel Estrup	28,657 / 28,657	$3,023,070
June 21, 2008	Glasgow	Scotland	Hampden Park	39,756 / 39,756	$3,564,277
June 22, 2008	Manchester	England	City of Manchester Stadium	57,235 / 57,235	$4,607,410
June 24, 2008	Coventry	England	Ricoh Arena	31,295 / 31,295	$2,874,196
June 25, 2008	Bristol	England	Ashton Gate	23,431 / 23,431	$2,567,812
June 27, 2008	London	England	Twickenham Stadium	92,852 / 92,852	$8,916,065
June 28, 2008	London	England	Twickenham Stadium	92,852 / 92,852	$8,916,065
North America
July 6, 2008	Sarnia	Canada	Sarnia Bayfest	15,443 / 15,443	$1,369,622
July 7, 2008	Auburn Hills	United States	The Palace of Auburn Hills	16,036 / 16,036	$1,314,545
July 9, 2008	Boston	United States	TD Banknorth Garden	30,141 / 30,141	$2,585,289
July 10, 2008	Boston	United States	TD Banknorth Garden	30,141 / 30,141	$2,585,289
July 12, 2008^{[B]}	New York City	United States	Central Park	n/a	n/a
July 14, 2008	New York City	United States	Madison Square Garden	36,536 / 36,536	$4,079,017
July 15, 2008	New York City	United States	Madison Square Garden	36,536 / 36,536	$4,079,017

^{B} This concert was for the MLB All Star Game"

== See also ==
- List of highest-grossing concert tours
