= Lost Highway =

Lost Highway may refer to:

== Film ==
- Lost Highway (film), a 1997 film by David Lynch
  - Lost Highway (soundtrack), the soundtrack for the Lynch film
  - Lost Highway (opera), a 2003 opera adaptation of Lynch's film

== Music ==
- Lost Highway Records, a country music record label now part of Universal Music Group Nashville

=== Albums and EPs ===
- Lost Highway, a 2002 EP by Helldorado
- Lost Highway (Bon Jovi album), 2007
  - Lost Highway: The Concert, 2007
- Lost Highway (Willie Nelson album), a 2009 compilation album

=== Songs ===
- "Lost Highway" (Leon Payne song), 1948, covered by Hank Williams
- "Lost Highway" (Angry Samoans song), 1988
- "Lost Highway" (Bon Jovi song), 2007

== Other uses ==
- Hank Williams: Lost Highway (musical), a stage musical based on the life of Hank Williams
