= Lost Highway: The Concert =

Live album / Video album by Bon Jovi
- Released: November 13, 2007
- Recorded: July 16, 2007
- Genres: Country rock; country; pop rock
- Label: Mercury Records
- Producer: Joe Thomas

Bon Jovi chronology
This Left Feels Right Live (2004)	Lost Highway: The Concert (2007)	When We Were Beautiful (2009)

Lost Highway: The Concert is the fourth live DVD from American rock band Bon Jovi. The DVD shows the band performing the Lost Highway album in its entirety to an audience of approximately 2,000 people in Chicago Illinois. It is the first time in the band's history that they have performed an entire album in sequence live. After they completed performing the album in its entirety, the band played three of their hits: "It's My Life", "Wanted Dead or Alive" and "Who Says You Can't Go Home". The concert was released as a bonus audio disk with the German and UK version of Lost Highway on May 16, 2008, under the name Lost Highway: Tour Edition.

== Performance information ==
On the songs that have female vocals on the album ("Seat Next to You" and "Till We Ain't Strangers Anymore"), violinist Lorenza Ponce sings the parts performed by the original artists on the studio versions.

"Any Other Day" features solos from Bobby Bandiera (rhythm guitar), Kurt Johnston (pedal steel guitar), Lorenza Ponce (violin), David Bryan (keyboards) and finishing with an extended solo from lead guitarist Richie Sambora. This stretches the song to over 8 minutes, double the length of the studio version.

== Track listing ==
1. Lost Highway
2. Summertime
3. (You Want To) Make a Memory
4. Whole Lot of Leavin'
5. We Got It Going On
6. Any Other Day
7. Seat Next to You
8. Everybody's Broken
9. Till We Ain't Strangers Anymore
10. The Last Night
11. One Step Closer
12. I Love This Town
13. It's My Life
14. Wanted Dead or Alive
15. Who Says You Can't Go Home

Clear Channel Stripped Bonus Performance Tracks (on DVD only)
No.	Title	Length
16.	"(You Want To) Make a Memory"
17.	"Lost Highway"
18.	"Wanted Dead or Alive"
19.	"Who Says You Can't Go Home"
20.	"Whole Lot of Leavin'"
21.	"Hallelujah (Leonard Cohen cover)"

== Technical notes ==
The European release, while having the correct region coding on the DVD, is still in the American NTSC picture format. The bonus performances are formatted as a 4:3 frame with a letterbox, which when viewed on a widescreen set produces a black area around all sides of the picture (windowboxing).

== Band personnel ==
Bon Jovi

- Jon Bon Jovi – lead vocals, acoustic guitar
- Richie Sambora – lead guitar, backing vocals
- David Bryan – keyboards, backing vocals
- Tico Torres – drums, percussion

Additional musicians

- Hugh McDonald – bass
- Bobby Bandiera – rhythm guitar, backing vocals
- Lorenza Ponce – violin, viola, backing vocals
- Kurt Johnston – pedal steel, mandolin

== Charts and certifications ==
=== Peak positions ===
Chart (2007–08)	Peak position
Belgian Music DVDs Chart (Flanders)	9
Dutch Music DVDs Chart	7
New Zealand Music DVDs Chart	2

=== Certifications ===
Region	Certification	Certified units/sales
Australia (ARIA)	Platinum	15,000^{^}
New Zealand (RMNZ)	Gold	2,500^{^}
^{^} Shipments figures based on certification alone.
