= Inside Out (Bon Jovi album) =

Live album by Bon Jovi
- Released: November 27, 2012
- Recorded: 2008–2010
- Length: 72:53
- Label: Island
- Producers: Bon Jovi; Richie Sambora; John Shanks; Desmond Child

Bon Jovi chronology
Greatest Hits (2010)	Inside Out (2012)	What About Now (2013)

Inside Out is the second live album by American rock band Bon Jovi, and was released on November 27, 2012. It includes songs from shows at O2 Arena, New Meadowlands Stadium, and Madison Square Garden, recorded during the band's Lost Highway Tour in 2008 and the Circle Tour in 2010.

== Release ==
The album was first shown at movie theaters, with screenings preceded by a question-and-answer session with Jon Bon Jovi, Richie Sambora, David Bryan and Tico Torres streamed live from a theater in New York, and was subsequently made available for purchase on iTunes.

== Track listing ==
Inside Out track listing
No.	Title	Length
1.	"Blood on Blood (song)"	6:18
2.	"Lost Highway"	4:12
3.	"Born to Be My Baby"	5:22
4.	"You Give Love a Bad Name"	3:49
5.	"Whole Lot of Leavin"	4:40
6.	"Raise Your Hands"	4:58
7.	"We Got It Going On"	4:52
8.	"Have a Nice Day"	4:05
9.	"It's My Life"	4:02
10.	"I'll Be There for You"	7:18
11.	"We Weren't Born to Follow"	4:12
12.	"Wanted Dead or Alive"	5:38
13.	"Livin' on a Prayer"	6:18
14.	"Keep the Faith"	7:09

== Personnel ==
- Jon Bon Jovi - lead vocals, guitar
- Richie Sambora - lead guitar, backing vocals, talkbox
- David Bryan - keyboards, backing vocals
- Tico Torres - drums, percussion

Additional personnel

- Hugh McDonald - bass, backing vocals
- Bobby Bandiera - rhythm guitar, backing vocals
- Lorenza Ponce - violin, backing vocals

== Charts and certifications ==
=== Weekly charts ===
Chart (2013)	Peak position
US Billboard 200	196
US Top Rock Albums (Billboard)	10
US Top Hard Rock Albums (Billboard)	40
