= Live from the Have a Nice Day Tour =

EP by Bon Jovi
- Released: February 7, 2006
- Recorded: Banknorth Garden, Boston, MA, December 10, 2005
- Genre: Hard rock
- Length: 29:37
- Label: Island

Live from the Have a Nice Day Tour is a live EP by American rock band Bon Jovi. It was released on February 7, 2006 only in United States through the Wal-Mart stores. It contains 6 live track recorded live during the Have a Nice Day Tour in Banknorth Garden, Boston, MA on December 10, 2005.

== Track listing ==
No.	Title	Writer(s)	Length
1.	"Last Man Standing"	Jon Bon Jovi, Billy Falcon	5:38
2.	"You Give Love a Bad Name"	Jon Bon Jovi, Richie Sambora, Desmond Child	3:50
3.	"Complicated"	Jon Bon Jovi, Billy Falcon, Max Martin	3:45
4.	"Have a Nice Day"	Jon Bon Jovi, Richie Sambora, John Shanks	4:04
5.	"Who Says You Can't Go Home"	Jon Bon Jovi, Richie Sambora	7:09
6.	"Raise Your Hands"	Jon Bon Jovi, Richie Sambora	5:11

== Notes ==
- These 6 tracks also appeared on the Japanese Tour Edition of the album Have a Nice Day.
- Tracks 1,3,6 were used as B-sides on the single "Who Says You Can't Go Home".
