= Till We Ain't Strangers Anymore =

Single by Bon Jovi featuring LeAnn Rimes

from the album Lost Highway
- Released: November 2007 (Worldwide)
- Genre: Country rock
- Length: [Album version] 4:43 [Radio Edit] 3:50
- Label: Island, Mercury Nashville
- Songwriters: Jon Bon Jovi, Richie Sambora, Brett James
- Producer: Dann Huff

Bon Jovi singles chronology
| "Lost Highway" (2007) | "Till We Ain't Strangers Anymore" (2007) | "Summertime" (2007) |

LeAnn Rimes singles chronology
| "Nothin' Better to Do" (2007) | "Till We Ain't Strangers Anymore" (2007) | "In Front of the Alamo" (2007) |

"Till We Ain't Strangers Anymore" is a song by American rock band Bon Jovi, from their tenth studio album, Lost Highway, released in 2007. The song was released by Mercury Nashville to radio in the United States, and as a CD Maxi in Germany, Switzerland and Austria in November 2007 as the album's third single. It features country pop singer LeAnn Rimes, and also appears as a bonus track on her 12th album, Family.

== Song background ==
It was written by Bon Jovi band members Jon Bon Jovi and Richie Sambora with country singer-songwriter Brett James, and produced by Dann Huff. The song was the second cross-over song with a female country singer by Bon Jovi, after "Who Says You Can't Go Home" with Jennifer Nettles of the duo Sugarland. Bon Jovi played the whole of the Lost Highway album live and released the concert as a DVD, although "Till We Ain't Strangers Anymore" was performed without Rimes.

== Awards and nominations ==
The song won the CMT Music Award for the Collaborative Video of the Year in 2008. Rimes accepted the award, as Bon Jovi was not at the awards ceremony. Bon Jovi's previous country duet, "Who Says You Can't Go Home", claimed the same award in 2006.

== Music video ==
A music video was released on November 22, 2007. The music video for "Till We Ain't Strangers Anymore" features Jon Bon Jovi and LeAnn Rimes walking around the streets of New York City at night. A bed scene was set up in front of the Flatiron Building. The song was also nominated for the Academy of Country Music Award for Vocal Event of the Year.

== Track listings ==
CD single (Catalogue number: 0602517555112)

1. "Till We Ain't Strangers Anymore" – 4:43
2. "Who Says You Can't Go Home" (Stripped) – 4:49

CD-Maxi (Catalogue number: 0602517555105)

1. "Till We Ain't Strangers Anymore" (Album version) – 4:43
2. "Lost Highway" (Stripped) – 4:08
3. "Who Says You Can't Go Home" (Stripped) – 4:45
4. "(You Want To) Make a Memory" (Live video from the Lost Highway Concert DVD)

== Charts ==
| Chart (2007) | Peak position |
|---|---|
| Germany (GfK) | 39 |
| US Hot Country Songs (Billboard) | 47 |
| US Bubbling Under Hot 100 (Billboard) | 23 |
