= Whole Lot of Leavin' =

Single by Bon Jovi

from the album Lost Highway
- Released: May 9, 2008 (Europe Only)
- Recorded: 2006–2007
- Studio: Henson, Hollywood; Starstruck, Nashville
- Genre: Hard rock; country rock
- Length: 4:16
- Label: Island; Mercury Nashville
- Songwriters: Jon Bon Jovi; John Shanks
- Producer: John Shanks

Bon Jovi singles chronology
"Summertime" (2007)	"Whole Lot of Leavin'" (2008)	"We Weren't Born to Follow" (2009)

"Whole Lot of Leavin'" is a song by American rock band Bon Jovi. It was written by Jon Bon Jovi and John Shanks and it was released only in Europe as the fourth single from the band's album Lost Highway.

== Lyrical content ==
The song talks about difficult times that Bon Jovi lead guitarist Richie Sambora was going through. Sambora's father died after a long battle with cancer. Just a month before, he divorced his wife Heather Locklear after ten years of marriage, and was going through a custody battle, while battling alcohol addiction. Jon Bon Jovi has said that he wrote the song about Sambora: "You see your best friend going through this hell, and it was an emotion that was right there to be had."

== Music video ==
The music video for the song "Whole Lot of Leavin'" was directed by Phil Griffin. It was recorded in black and white, and features Jon Bon Jovi sitting in a hotel room singing and playing acoustic guitar. During the video, we see photos of Jon and Richie Sambora shot during a live performance and also couple of shots of concert setlists. During the solo, we see photos of Sambora playing guitar, and at the end of the video, we see a picture of the whole band. Just like in a music video for the song "(You Want to) Make a Memory", Jon's vocals from a live performance of the song were used over the original album version.

== Live performances ==
The song has proved popular with many fans and has been performed at many promotional events for the band including live on the Today show and for MTV Unplugged. It was performed in the middle of all concerts during the Lost Highway Tour, and has been played regularly early in the set during The Circle Tour. Live performance of that song is also featured on the Lost Highway: The Concert DVD.

== Track listings and formats ==
European CD Single (Island: 0602517728073)
No.	Title	Writer(s)	Length
1.	"Whole Lot of Leavin'"	Bon Jovi, Shanks	4:15
2.	"Wanted Dead or Alive" (Recorded live in Chicago, 2007)	Bon Jovi, Richie Sambora	5:27
Total length:			9:45

European CD-Maxi Single (Island: 1771749)
No.	Title	Writer(s)	Length
1.	"Whole Lot of Leavin'"	Bon Jovi, Shanks	4:15
2.	"Wanted Dead or Alive" (Recorded live in Chicago, 2007)	Bon Jovi, Sambora	5:27
3.	"Put the Boy Back in Cowboy"	Bon Jovi	3:59
4.	"I Love This Town" (Recorded live at Canerry Ballroom, Nashville, TN on March 1, 2007)	Bon Jovi, Sambora, Billy Falcon	4:47
Total length:			18:31

== Charts ==
Chart (2008)	Peak position
Austria (Ö3 Austria Top 40)	22
Germany (GfK)	41
Hungary (Rádiós Top 40)	22

== Covers ==
The song was covered by South African singer Ray Dylan on volume 3 of his album Goeie Ou Country
