= Legendary (Bon Jovi song) =

Bon Jovi song

Single by Bon Jovi

from the album Forever
- Released: March 14, 2024
- Genre: Arena rock
- Length: 4:05
- Label: Island
- Songwriters: Jon Bon Jovi; John Shanks; Billy Falcon
- Producers: John Shanks; Jon Bon Jovi

Bon Jovi singles chronology
"Story of Love" (2021)	"Legendary" (2024)	"Living Proof" (2024)

"Legendary" is a song by American rock band Bon Jovi, written by Jon Bon Jovi, John Shanks, and Billy Falcon, and released as the lead single from the 2024 album Forever on March 14, 2024. The song is a tribute to Jon Bon Jovi's wife, who said he was very proud of the song.

== Charts ==
In the US, the song reached number nine on the Billboard Adult Contemporary chart, number 15 on the Adult Pop Airplay chart, and number two on the Rock Digital Song Sales chart. It reached number 21 in Canada, number 27 in the UK, and number 70 in Japan.

== Charts ==
=== Weekly charts ===
Weekly chart performance for "Legendary"
Chart (2024)	Peak position
US Adult Contemporary (Billboard)	9
US Adult Pop Airplay (Billboard)	15

=== Year-end charts ===
Year-end chart performance for "Legendary"
Chart (2024)	Position
US Adult Contemporary (Billboard)	17
