= Access All Areas: A Rock & Roll Odyssey =

Video by Bon Jovi
- Released: 1990
- Recorded: 1988–1990
- Genre: Rock, documentary
- Length: 90 minutes
- Label: Mercury Records

Bon Jovi chronology
New Jersey: The Videos (1989)	Access All Areas: A Rock & Roll Odyssey (1990)	Keep the Faith: An Evening with Bon Jovi (1993)

Access All Areas: A Rock & Roll Odyssey is a documentary following rock band Bon Jovi on their successful New Jersey Syndicate Tour between 1988 and 1990. It contains live, backstage, and candid footage of the band, soundtracked with their music. The film was initially released on VHS in 1990 and on DVD in 2014 as part of the New Jersey: Super Deluxe Edition, along with New Jersey: The Videos.

== Contents ==
1. Introduction
2. Show #3 / Dublin, Ireland
3. Show #9 / Rome, Italy
4. Italian TV Show
5. Behind The Iron Curtan
6. Moscow Music Peace Festival
7. First Leg European Tour
8. Rio de Janeiro, Brazil
9. Tokyo, Japan
10. All Star Jam, Wembley Arena, England
11. In Store Signing / London, England
12. Berlin, Germany
13. Nordhoff Robbins Music Therapy Benefit
14. Sydney, Australia
15. The Homecoming
16. Rare Club Dates
17. Show #232 / The Last Gig
18. "Livin' On A Prayer"
19. Credits

== Availability ==
- VHS
- LaserDisc
- DVD (exclusively as part of the Japanese Special Edition albums box set and New Jersey 2014 Super Deluxe Edition)

== Additional information ==
- Access All Areas: A Rock & Roll Odyssey was also available as a double VHS feature which also contains the New Jersey: The Videos package.
- Access All Areas: A Rock & Roll Odyssey was released on DVD in 2010 exclusively to the Japan Special Editions box set, but includes Japanese subtitles embedded into the footage.

== Certifications ==
Region	Certification	Certified units/sales
United States (RIAA)	Gold	50,000^{^}
^{^} Shipments figures based on certification alone.
