= New Jersey: The Videos =

Video by Bon Jovi
- Released: 1989
- Recorded: 1988–1989
- Genre: Glam metal; hard rock
- Length: 45 minutes
- Label: Mercury

Bon Jovi chronology
| Slippery When Wet: The Videos (1987) | New Jersey: The Videos (1989) | Access All Areas: A Rock & Roll Odyssey (1990) |

New Jersey: The Videos is a package featuring all the videos from Bon Jovi's New Jersey album, together with interviews and backstage footage. The video was initially released on VHS in 1989 and on DVD in 2014 as part of the New Jersey: Super Deluxe Edition, along with Access All Areas: A Rock & Roll Odyssey.

== Track listing ==
| No. | Title | Writer(s) | Length |
|---|---|---|---|
| 1. | "Bad Medicine" (First version) | Jon Bon Jovi; Richie Sambora; Desmond Child |
| 2. | "Born to Be My Baby" | J. Bon Jovi; Sambora; Child |
| 3. | "I'll Be There for You" | J. Bon Jovi; Sambora |
| 4. | "Lay Your Hands on Me" | J. Bon Jovi; Sambora |
| 5. | "Living in Sin" | J. Bon Jovi |
| 6. | "Blood on Blood" (Live) | J. Bon Jovi; Sambora; Child |
| 7. | "Bad Medicine" (Second version) | J. Bon Jovi; Sambora; Child |

== Additional information ==
- New Jersey: The Videos was also available as a double VHS feature which also contains the Access All Areas: A Rock & Roll Odyssey documentary.
- Before the start of "Born to Be My Baby" music video, drummer Tico Torres' obscenity is completely bleeped out, however on the Video CD, whilst still bleeped, the word is very much audible.

== Certifications ==
| Region | Certification | Certified units/sales |
|---|---|---|
| United States (RIAA) | Platinum | 100,000^{^} |
| Canada (Music Canada) | Gold | 5,000^{^} |
^{^} Shipments figures based on certification alone.
