= Have a Nice Day Tour =

2005–06 concert tour by Bon Jovi

- Tour by Bon Jovi
- Poster to the concert in Koblenz, Germany
- Location: North America, Asia, Europe
- Associated album: Have a Nice Day
- Start date: November 2, 2005
- End date: July 29, 2006
- No. of shows: 89
- Box office: US $131.4 million ($209.85 in 2025 dollars)

Bon Jovi concert chronology
- Bounce Tour (2002–2003); Have a Nice Day Tour (2005–2006); Lost Highway Tour (2007–2008)

The Have a Nice Day Tour was a worldwide concert tour by American rock band Bon Jovi. It took place between November 2005 and July 2006. The tour supported their ninth studio album Have a Nice Day.

The tour was a significant commercial success – the group played to about 2 million fans and the tour grossed a total of $132 million. It was the third-highest-grossing tour of 2006, just behind the Rolling Stones' A Bigger Bang World Tour and Madonna's Confessions Tour.

== The show ==
Time Warner Cable Arena, Charlotte, North Carolina, January 18, 2006

The set lists greatly varied between concerts, so after each show its set list was posted on the official website. Most concerts began with the song "Last Man Standing" from the Have a Nice Day record, with the show beginning as Jon Bon Jovi suddenly appeared on a small platform in the middle of the audience at the far end from the stage, followed by "You Give Love a Bad Name". "Livin' on a Prayer" was almost always played as the finalé before any encores.

For the early North American and United Kingdom dates, each city had a local band open for Bon Jovi; the band had decided this for a chance to promote local talent. Canadian band Nickelback, who had great success with their latest release (All The Right Reasons) supported Bon Jovi on the European dates of the tour, as well as on the band's summer stadium tour in North America.

== Opening act ==
- Nickelback (since European leg except in Hollywood)
- The Nadas (Des Moines only)

== Setlist ==
Typical setlist:

1. "Last Man Standing"
2. "You Give Love a Bad Name"
3. "Complicated"
4. "Born to Be My Baby"
5. "Story of My Life"
6. "I'll Sleep When I'm Dead"
7. "Runaway"
8. "The Radio Saved My Life Tonight"
9. "Novocaine"
10. "I Won't Back Down" (Tom Petty cover)
11. "Have a Nice Day"
12. "Who Says You Can't Go Home?"
13. "It's My Life"
14. "I'll Be There for You"
15. "Blaze of Glory" (cover)
16. "Bed of Roses"
17. "Bad Medicine"
18. "Raise Your Hands"
19. "Livin' on a Prayer"

Encore:

20. "Welcome to Wherever You Are"
21. "In These Arms"
22. "Everyday"
23. "Wanted Dead or Alive"
24. "Someday I'll Be Saturday Night"

== Tour dates ==
List of concerts, showing date, city, country, venue, attendance (tickets sold / total available) and gross revenue
Date	City	Country	Venue	Attendance (tickets sold / total available)	Revenue
North America
November 2, 2005	Des Moines	United States	Wells Fargo Arena	13,499 / 13,499	$926,882
November 4, 2005	Chicago	United States	United Center	30,908 / 30,908	$2,442,056
November 5, 2005	Chicago	United States	United Center	30,908 / 30,908	$2,442,056
November 8, 2005	Cleveland	United States	Quicken Loans Arena	N/A	N/A
November 9, 2005	Columbus	United States	Value City Arena	12,015 / 12,015	$829,168
November 11, 2005	Minneapolis	United States	Target Center	13,684 / 13,684	$960,181
November 12, 2005	Omaha	United States	CenturyLink Center Omaha	14,788 / 14,788	$1,051,694
November 16, 2005	Madison	United States	Kohl Center	12,462 / 12,462	$827,653
November 18, 2005	Auburn Hills	United States	The Palace of Auburn Hills	30,169 / 30,169	$1,990,713
November 19, 2005	Auburn Hills	United States	The Palace of Auburn Hills	30,169 / 30,169	$1,990,713
November 26, 2005	Uncasville	United States	Mohegan Sun Arena	7,889 / 8,212	$751,635
November 28, 2005	New York City	United States	Madison Square Garden	30,040 / 30,040	$2,420,274
November 29, 2005	New York City	United States	Madison Square Garden	30,040 / 30,040	$2,420,274
December 2, 2005	Philadelphia	United States	Wachovia Center	31,134 / 31,134	$2,579,183
December 3, 2005	Philadelphia	United States	Wachovia Center	31,134 / 31,134	$2,579,183
December 6, 2005	Pittsburgh	United States	Mellon Arena	12,633 / 12,633	$969,090
December 7, 2005	Uniondale	United States	Nassau Veterans Memorial Coliseum	12,771 / 14,000	$1,052,653
December 9, 2005	Boston	United States	TD Banknorth Garden	27,941 / 27,941	$2,230,413
December 10, 2005	Boston	United States	TD Banknorth Garden	27,941 / 27,941	$2,230,413
December 12, 2005	Albany	United States	Pepsi Arena	12,060 / 12,060	$809,463
December 14, 2005	Montreal	Canada	Bell Centre	29,860 / 29,860	$2,542,409
December 15, 2005	Montreal	Canada	Bell Centre	29,860 / 29,860	$2,542,409
December 17, 2005	Washington, D.C.	United States	MCI Center	15,128 / 15,128	$1,179,297
December 19, 2005	East Rutherford	United States	Izod Center	52,075 / 52,075	$3,915,607
December 21, 2005	East Rutherford	United States	Izod Center	52,075 / 52,075	$3,915,607
December 22, 2005	East Rutherford	United States	Izod Center	52,075 / 52,075	$3,915,607
North America
January 14, 2006	Oklahoma City	United States	Ford Center	15,236/ 15,236	$1,068,439
January 15, 2006	Dallas	United States	American Airlines Center	15,373 / 15,373	$1,105,187
January 17, 2006	Atlanta	United States	Philips Arena	14,262 / 14,262	$1,095,715
January 18, 2006	Charlotte	United States	Time Warner Cable Arena	14,628 / 14,628	$938,136
January 20, 2006	Buffalo	United States	First Niagara Center	15,124 / 15,124	$972,789
January 21, 2006	Toronto	Canada	Air Canada Centre	65,690 / 65,690	$5,871,898
January 23, 2006	Toronto	Canada	Air Canada Centre	65,690 / 65,690	$5,871,898
January 24, 2006	Toronto	Canada	Air Canada Centre	65,690 / 65,690	$5,871,898
January 27, 2006	Saint Paul	United States	Xcel Energy Center	15,531 / 15,531	$1,204,593
January 28, 2006	Milwaukee	United States	BMO Harris Bradley Center	15,106 / 15,106	$1,023,297
January 30, 2006	Toronto	Canada	Air Canada Centre	(Note: The score data is representative of the four shows in Toronto, Ontario at the Air Canada Centre on January 21, January 23, January 24, and January 30 respectively.)	
February 1, 2006	Uncasville	United States	Mohegan Sun Arena	8,284 / 8,284	$812,395
February 2, 2006	Washington, D.C.	United States	Verizon Center	14,911 / 14,911	$1,158,696
February 4, 2006	Atlantic City	United States	Boardwalk Hall	12,752 / 12,942	$1,112,210
February 8, 2006	Greenville	United States	Bi-Lo Center	11,575 / 11,575	$689,595
February 10, 2006	Sunrise	United States	BankAtlantic Center	14,895 / 14,895	$1,123,956
February 14, 2006	Nashville	United States	Gaylord Entertainment Center	14,980 / 14,980	$1,138,949
February 15, 2006	Duluth	United States	Arena at Gwinnett Center	10,852 / 10,852	$935,394
February 17, 2006	Tampa	United States	St. Pete Times Forum	29,498 / 29,498	$2,130,484
February 18, 2006	Tampa	United States	St. Pete Times Forum	29,498 / 29,498	$2,130,484
February 21, 2006	Houston	United States	Toyota Center	12,723 / 12,723	$800,988
February 23, 2006	Denver	United States	Pepsi Center	14,023 / 14,023	$1,012,082
February 25, 2006	Anaheim	United States	Arrowhead Pond	13,056 / 13,056	$935,066
February 27, 2006	San Jose	United States	HP Pavilion at San Jose	13,076 / 13,076	$949,183
March 1, 2006	Fresno	United States	Save Mart Center	11,734 / 11,734	$841,575
March 3, 2006	Los Angeles	United States	Staples Center	13,753 / 13,753	$1,007,231
March 5, 2006	Portland	United States	Rose Garden	13,240 / 13,240	$863,768
March 6, 2006	Seattle	United States	KeyArena	12,649 / 12,649	$949,10
March 9, 2006	Glendale	United States	Glendale Arena	14,885 / 14,885	$1,124,277
March 11, 2006	Paradise	United States	MGM Grand Garden Arena	14,230 / 14,230	$1,573,953
Japan
April 8, 2006	Tokyo	Japan	Tokyo Dome	N/A	N/A
April 9, 2006	Tokyo	Japan	Tokyo Dome	N/A	N/A
April 12, 2006	Nagoya	Japan	Nagoya Dome	N/A	N/A
April 14, 2006	Osaka	Japan	Osaka Dome	N/A	N/A
April 15, 2006	Osaka	Japan	Osaka Dome	N/A	N/A
April 18, 2006	Sapporo	Japan	Sapporo Dome	N/A	N/A
Europe
May 13, 2006	Düsseldorf	Germany	LTU Arena	47,862 / 47,862	$3,325,809
May 15, 2006	Linz	Austria	Linzer Stadion	32,002 / 32,002	$2,063,255
May 17, 2006	Koblenz	Germany	Schloßplatz	26,509 / 26,509	$1,524,278
May 20, 2006	Dublin	Ireland	Croke Park	81,327 / 81,327	$6,414,434
May 24, 2006	Hessisch Lichtenau	Germany	Hessentag	29,007 / 29,007	$1,579,140
May 25, 2006	Nijmegen	Netherlands	Goffert Park	39,815 / 39,815	$2,594,671
May 27, 2006	Stuttgart	Germany	Cannstatter Wasen	63,020 / 63,020	$3,654,201
May 28, 2006	Munich	Germany	Olympiastadion	71,467 / 71,467	$4,622,221
May 30, 2006	Innsbruck	Austria	Olympia Stadium	25,660 / 25,660	$1,734,771
May 31, 2006	Bern	Switzerland	Stade de Suisse	38,762 / 38,762	$3,354,198
June 3, 2006	Glasgow	Scotland	Hampden Park	42,488 / 42,488	$2,853,220
June 4, 2006	Manchester	England	Etihad Stadium	58,698 / 58,698	$3,744,610
June 7, 2006	Coventry	England	Ricoh Arena	36,293 / 36,293	$2,300,799
June 9, 2006	Southampton	England	St. Mary's Stadium	34,783 / 34,783	$2,365,643
June 10, 2006	Milton Keynes	England	National Bowl^{1}	85,112 / 85,112	$6,489,043
June 11, 2006	Milton Keynes	England	National Bowl^{1}	85,112 / 85,112	$6,489,043
June 13, 2006	Hull	England	KC Stadium^{1}	N/A	N/A
North America
July 10, 2006	Hollywood	United States	Seminole Hard Rock Live	N/A	N/A
July 13, 2006	Montreal	Canada	Parc Jean-Drapeau	21,150 / 21,150	$1,483,759
July 15, 2006	Philadelphia	United States	Citizens Bank Park	39,409 / 44,238	$2,764,310
July 18, 2006	East Rutherford	United States	Giants Stadium	164,975 / 164,975	$11,352,051
July 19, 2006	East Rutherford	United States	Giants Stadium	164,975 / 164,975	$11,352,051
July 21, 2006	Chicago	United States	Soldier Field	52,612 / 52,612	$3,988,455
July 23, 2006	Pittsburgh	United States	Heinz Field	N/A	N/A
July 27, 2006	Foxborough	United States	Gillette Stadium	45,874 / 45,874	$3,384,804
July 29, 2006	East Rutherford	United States	Giants Stadium	(Note: The score data is representative of the three shows in East Rutherford, New Jersey at the Giants Stadium on July 18, July 19, and July 29 respectively.)	
TOTAL				1,823,834	$131,388,461

^Note 1: These performances were originally scheduled at the new Wembley Stadium in London (the band were due to be the first band to play at the new stadium, having closed the old stadium with their Crush Tour in August 2000), however they were moved when the completion of the stadium was delayed until 2007.

== Personnel ==
Bon Jovi

- Jon Bon Jovi – lead vocals, acoustic guitar, maracas for Keep the Faith
- Richie Sambora – lead guitar, slide guitar, talk box, backing vocals
- David Bryan – keyboards, backing vocals
- Tico Torres – drums, percussion

Additional musicians

- Hugh McDonald – bass, backing vocals
- Bobby Bandiera – rhythm guitar, backing vocals
- Jeff Kazee – keyboards, Hammond organ, backing vocals

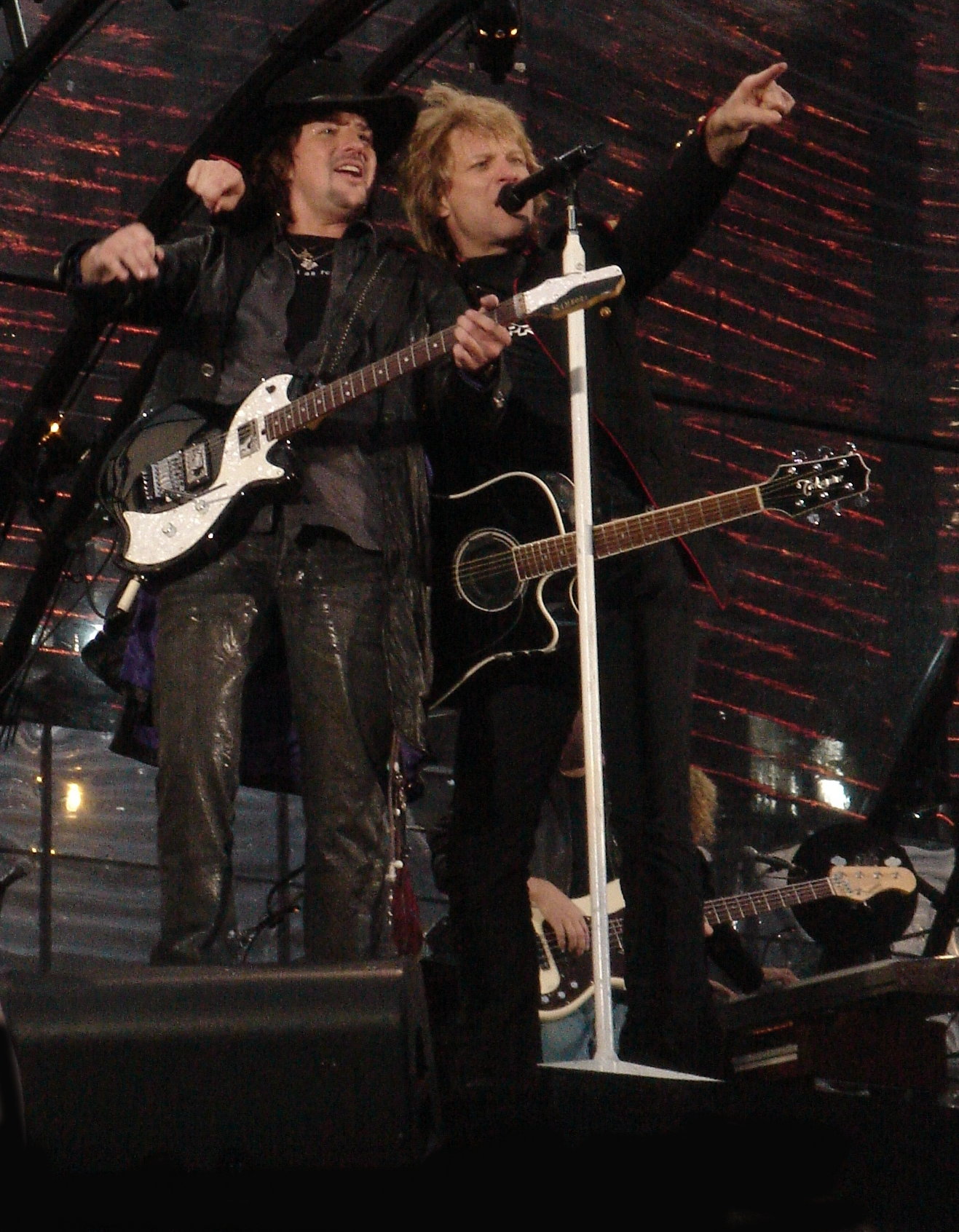
Sambora (left), Bon Jovi (right) in Dublin, May 2006
