= Slippery When Wet: The Videos =

Video by Bon Jovi
- Released: 1987
- Recorded: 1986–1987
- Genre: Glam metal; hard rock
- Length: 40 minutes
- Label: Mercury

Bon Jovi chronology
Breakout: Video Singles (1985)	Slippery When Wet: The Videos (1987)	New Jersey: The Videos (1989)

Slippery When Wet: The Videos is a music video album by American rock band Bon Jovi, released by Mercury Records in 1987. It contains the music videos from the band's third album Slippery When Wet, plus interviews and backstage footage.

== Track listing ==
No.	Title	Writer(s)	Length
1.	"Wild in the Streets"	Jon Bon Jovi
2.	"Livin' on a Prayer" (Live at the 1987 MTV Video Music Awards)	J. Bon Jovi; Richie Sambora; Desmond Child
3.	"You Give Love a Bad Name"	J. Bon Jovi; Sambora; Child
4.	"Never Say Goodbye"	J. Bon Jovi; Sambora
5.	"Livin' on a Prayer" (Music video)	J. Bon Jovi; Sambora; Child
6.	"Wanted Dead or Alive"	J. Bon Jovi; Sambora

== Certifications ==
Region	Certification	Certified units/sales
United States (RIAA)	2× Platinum	200,000^{^}
Canada (Music Canada)	Platinum	10,000^{^}
^{^} Shipments figures based on certification alone.
