= Welcome to Wherever You Are (song) =

2005 single by Bon Jovi

Single by Bon Jovi

from the album Have a Nice Day
- Released: December 16, 2005
- Length: 3:47
- Label: Island; Mercury
- Songwriters: Jon Bon Jovi; Richie Sambora; John Shanks
- Producers: Jon Bon Jovi; Richie Sambora; John Shanks

Bon Jovi singles chronology
"Have a Nice Day" (2005)	"Welcome to Wherever You Are" (2005)	"Who Says You Can't Go Home" (2006)

"Welcome to Wherever You Are" is a song by American rock band Bon Jovi from their ninth studio album, Have a Nice Day (2005). It was released in December 2005 as the album's second worldwide single, following "Have a Nice Day". Speaking about the song on Larry King Live, Jon Bon Jovi said "I thought for sure this was going to be a universal, timeless theme song of unity, diversity. Not a hit, not even close. Swing and a miss". The single reached the top 40 in several European countries, including the United Kingdom, where it peaked at number 19.

== Lyrical content ==
"Welcome to Wherever You Are" is a song of affirmation, about accepting who you are and being comfortable in your own skin. Jon Bon Jovi claims the song is greatly influenced by events during the 2004 Presidential Election. Jon campaigned for John Kerry during that time. The song is also notable for being one of the few Bon Jovi songs lacking a guitar solo.

The song also shares its name with an episode of The West Wing's seventh season, in which Jon Bon Jovi appears endorsing the fictional presidential nomination Matt Santos.

== Track listings ==
UK and European CD1

1. "Welcome to Wherever You Are" (Jeremy Wheatley mix)
2. "Last Man Standing" (live at Nokia Theatre in New York City, September 19, 2005)

UK CD2

1. "Welcome to Wherever You Are" (Jeremy Wheatley mix)
2. "Someday I'll Be Saturday Night" (live at Nokia Theatre in New York City, September 19, 2005)
3. "Wanted Dead or Alive" (live at Nokia Theatre in New York City, September 19, 2005)
4. "Wanted Dead or Alive" (video—live at Nokia Theatre in New York City, September 19, 2005)

UK DVD single

1. "Welcome to Wherever You Are" (video)
2. "Have a Nice Day" (video—live at Nokia Theatre in New York City, September 19, 2005)
3. "Who Says You Can't Go Home" (audio—live at Nokia Theatre in New York City, September 19, 2005)
4. Photo gallery

European CD2

1. "Welcome to Wherever You Are"
2. "Have a Nice Day" (live at Nokia Theatre in New York City, September 19, 2005)
3. "Someday I'll Be Saturday Night" (live at Nokia Theatre in New York City, September 19, 2005)
4. "It's My Life" (live at Nokia Theatre in New York City, September 19, 2005)

== Charts ==
Chart (2006)	Peak position
Austria (Ö3 Austria Top 40)	36
Belgium (Ultratip Bubbling Under Flanders)	9
Czech Republic (Rádio – Top 100)	74
European Hot 100 Singles	53
Germany (GfK)	40
Greece (IFPI)	16
Hungary (Rádiós Top 40)	25
Italy (FIMI)	33
Netherlands (Dutch Top 40 Tipparade)	2
Netherlands (Single Top 100)	25
Scotland Singles (OCC)	10
Switzerland (Schweizer Hitparade)	46
UK Singles (OCC)	19
Ukraine Airplay (TopHit)	161

== Release history ==
Region	Date	Format	Label	Ref.
Germany	December 16, 2005	CD	Island	
Europe	January 17, 2006	CD	Island	
United Kingdom	January 30, 2006	CD	Mercury	
