= Lost Highway (Bon Jovi album) =

Studio album by Bon Jovi
- Released: June 8, 2007
- Recorded: September 2006–February 2007
- Studios: Blackbird (Nashville, Tennessee); Henson (Hollywood, California); NRG (Hollywood, California); Starstruck (Nashville, Tennessee)
- Genre: Country rock
- Length: 49:57
- Labels: Island; Mercury
- Producers: Dann Huff; John Shanks

Bon Jovi chronology
Have a Nice Day (2005)	Lost Highway (2007)	The Circle (2009)

Singles from Lost Highway
- 1. "(You Want to) Make a Memory" Released: May 25, 2007; 2. "Lost Highway" Released: September 9, 2007; 3. "Till We Ain't Strangers Anymore" Released: November 30, 2007; 4. "Summertime" Released: 2007 (Canada only); 5. "Whole Lot of Leavin'" Released: May 9, 2008

Lost Highway is the tenth studio album by American rock band Bon Jovi, released on June 19, 2007, in the US through Island Records. Produced by John Shanks and Dann Huff, the album was recorded at Black Bird Studios, Nashville and NGR Recording, Hollywood.

The album combines the band's rock sound with elements of country music following the success of a country version of the band's 2006 single "Who Says You Can't Go Home", a duet with Jennifer Nettles, which reached No. 1 on the U.S. country chart in May 2006. Following the success had with the duet version of "Who Says You Can't Go Home", there are two songs on the album produced in collaboration with other artists, namely "We Got It Going On" featuring Big & Rich and the single "Till We Ain't Strangers Anymore" featuring LeAnn Rimes.

Described by Jon Bon Jovi as not a country album, but a "Bon Jovi record influenced by Nashville", the album debuted at No. 1 on the Billboard 200, becoming Bon Jovi's first ever album to debut at No. 1 and their third album to reach that position in the United States. The album was nominated for Best Pop Vocal Album at the 2008 Grammy Awards. This was the band's first studio album in the country music genre.

== Background ==
In the summer of 2006, Jon Bon Jovi revealed that he and Richie Sambora were planning to go to Nashville, Tennessee, to record the next Bon Jovi album. Their intention was to write songs and record duets with famous country songwriters and artists. Jon explained: "I'm thinking of a Nashville sessions record. I'd like to knock out a quick record with a few country writers and artists and me and Richie. I'd like to get two or three artists to do duets with. I'd like to give a couple of Nashville songwriters a chance to shine, and Richie and I would write a few songs to prove we could hold our own with these guys." Band members went to Nashville in September 2006. and by December they had written, recorded and prepared for mixing ten out of twelve songs. In early 2007, Jon Bon Jovi pulled back the album and wrote five more songs and two of them made the album.

Bon Jovi had success with 'Who Says You Can't Go Home', the second single from Have a Nice Day (2005). It reached #1 on U.S. Billboard Hot Country Songs chart making Bon Jovi the first rock band to top that chart. The song also won a Grammy Award and People's Choice Award. Inspired by its success, the band thought of making a country-influenced Bon Jovi album in Nashville. Jon contacted L.A. Reid from Island and told him about the idea and through the conversation he realized the downside of making that kind of album, but he still wanted to do it because he wanted to express his artistic freedom. When the band came to Nashville, they didn't know what kind of album it would be, but they knew what they would write about.

A lot of things happened in the band members' personal lives after the Have a Nice Day Tour. "If someone had said, You're going to write a record in September, having come off the road in August," noted Bon Jovi in 2007, "I would have said no, because I wasn't going to repeat the mistake of Slippery into New Jersey. But then I started observing things happening in our world. Richie went through a divorce [from Heather Locklear] and his dad passed away [from cancer]. Meanwhile Dave got a divorce and was fighting for custody of his kids. Watching the sadness, compounded by these newfound freedoms for Richie and Dave as individuals, make me think about what we should write about."

The band met with songwriters from Nashville who had written hits, but there was no chemistry in the studio. Instead, they worked with less known and successful artists and found chemistry among themselves. Those songwriters are Billy Falcon with whom they wrote "Everybody's Broken" and "I Love This Town", Brett James with whom they wrote "Till We Ain't Strangers Anymore", Gordie Sampson with whom they wrote "Any Other Day" and Hillary Lindsey with whom they wrote "Seat Next to You". They recorded half the album in Starstruck Studios and Blackbird Studios in Nashville and the other half in Henson Recording Studios and NRG Recording Studios in Hollywood. Band members stayed at Hermitage Hotel where Bon Jovi and Sambora wrote songs for the album.

The band worked with producers John Shanks, who co-produced their previous album Have a Nice Day (2005) and Dan Huff who was the additional producer on the country version of the song "Who Says You Can't Go Home". Each producer produced six songs. Shanks produced and also co-wrote "Lost Highway", "Summertime", "Whole Lot of Leavin'", "Everybody's Broken", "The Last Night" and "One Step Closer". Those songs were recorded in Henson Recording Studios in Los Angeles and Starstruck Studios in Nashville and they were engineered by Jeff Rothschild. Remaining songs "(You Want to) Make a Memory", "We Got It Going On", "Seat Next to You", "Till We Ain't Strangers Anymore" and "I Love This Town" were recorded in Blackbird Studios in Nashville and NRG Recording Studios in Hollywood and they were engineered by Justin Niebank and Mark Hagen. After album was recorded, Jon wasn't satisfied with the mix of the album because it didn't have dynamics and range so he decided it needed to be re-mixed.

The title track "Lost Highway" is a song that talks about going on a new and unknown place that no one knows exists. They took the title from Nashville record label Lost Highway Records formed by Luke Lewis. Jon explained: "That name and what it brought up in your mind, that dark road stretching out in front of you, intrigued me. I wanted to go down that road and see where it led. I think it was a perfect image for where I am in my life and where Richie was and maybe for where you are? That idea, of being out there somewhere new, out in the open, on that blacktop, really excited me. No one knows where it's going or if it even exists - I don't know and I don't think anyone else does either".

"We Got It Going On" is song that was written after Jon Bon Jovi met Big Kenny and John Rich in a bar. They started a conversation and after five minutes they had come up with a title, lyrics and music. It is influenced by the Beastie Boys. "Till We Ain't Strangers Anymore" is a song that was originally cut in a lower key to suit a male vocalist. Since the band couldn't find any male singer who was satisfactory, they decided to re-record the song entirely in a different key and try female singers. After multiple failed attempts with different singers, they tried recording with LeAnn Rimes. Jon explained: "We wanted a woman, not a girl, on the song. And we knew she could bring that. There was no ego involved; she came in and did her job and did an amazing job". "One Step Closer" is a song that is about getting one step closer to something, hopefully something good.

== Promotion ==
Jon served as a keynote speaker at the 2007 Country Radio Seminar (CRS) in Nashville. As a part of the seminar, the band performed a private concert at Nashville's Cannery Ballroom for about 400 invited country programmers. The band performed many songs from the new album along with their hits. "We Got It Going On" was chosen as a theme song for the Arena Football League's weekly programming which debuted on March 4, 2007, at 12:30 ET on ABC and was also used in a show-opening video which took fans inside an Arena Football League arena. The footage aired before games between the Dallas Desperados and the New York Dragons, and the Chicago Rush and the Kansas City Brigade. Jon Bon Jovi has recorded team-specific lyrics for every one of the AFL franchises that aired throughout the season. Title track "Lost Highway" also appeared in the film Wild Hogs (2007). The album title, first single and their release dates were announced on March 19, 2007. The first single of the album, "(You Want to) Make a Memory", was released on radio stations on March 20, 2007, and on the same day it was put on a stream on the band's official website. Pre-orders for the album started on May 10, 2007. iTunes Store pre-orders offered the instant download of the first single "(You Want to) Make a Memory" and live versions of "(You Want to) Make a Memory" and "Lost Highway" recorded at the Cannery Ballroom in Nashville. On June 5, 2007, Bon Jovi played three and a half hour set with 20 songs in Steiner Studios. The band taped this show for an Unplugged special which was broadcast on MTV, VH1 and CMT. On June 22, MTV broadcast a half-hour version of the concert, VH1 broadcast a one-hour version of the concert on June 23, while CMT broadcast an hour and a half long version of the concert on June 24, 2007. On June 12, 2007, VH1 put on a preview of the entire album on their official website. On June 24, 2007, Bon Jovi opened The O2 Arena in London and played concert which coincided with the release of this album. Tickets for this concert went on sale on April 20, 2007, at 9 a.m. and were sold out in one minute, and was the only Bon Jovi concert in United Kingdom in 2007. It was the first time in 15 years that Bon Jovi played indoors in the United Kingdom.

=== Tour ===
In the summer of 2007, Bon Jovi performed ten concerts around the world as part of the Lost Highway promotion, with plans for a full greatest hits world tour in 2008. However, after Lost Highway did better than expected, the world tour was moved forward to the fall of 2007, and was renamed the Lost Highway Tour. The tour consisted of ten dates in New Jersey, followed by Canadian and Japanese tours, as well as the band's first stadium concert in New Zealand since the These days tour. The tour also saw them play Australia for the first time since their brief appearance at the Rumba Festivals in 2002, playing sold-out shows in Melbourne, Sydney and Perth. The band then toured the U.S. and Europe in spring and summer 2008, before returning to North America for a few more summer shows, including a free concert in Central Park in New York City.

== Critical and commercial reception ==
Professional ratings
Aggregate scores
Source	Rating
Metacritic	(64/100)
Review scores
Source	Rating
AllMusic	3/5 stars
BBC	(positive)
Blender	3/5 stars
Entertainment Weekly	B−
The New York Times	(positive)
NOW	3/5 Ns
Rolling Stone	3/5 stars
USA Today	3/4 stars
Yahoo! Music UK	7/10 stars

At Metacritic, which assigns a normalised rating out of 100 to reviews from mainstream critics, the album has received an average score of 64 out of 100, which indicates generally favorable reviews, based on 12 reviews. Stephen Thomas Erlewine from AllMusic gave the album 3 stars out of 5 stating that "Lost Highway recalls nothing so much as a latter-day Bon Jovi record in how it balances fist-pumping arena anthems with heavy doses of sentiment". Helen Groom from BBC gave positive statement about the album saying that "Lost Highway hasn't lost any of the huge sing-along choruses that has made Bon Jovi one of the largest stadium rocking bands in the world, but to their credit, they are trying something a bit different at the same time as giving their fans what they want". Karen Shoemer from Blender gave the album 3 stars out of 5 saying that "Luckily, Bon Jovi's country-music move yields just... one irritant". Whitney Pastorek from Entertainment Weekly rated album with B− stating that "Bon Jovi have mostly just succeeded in making a slightly above-average Bon Jovi disc — albeit one with a lot more songs about driving". Nate Chinen from The New York Times gave a positive statement about the album saying that "[It] yield[s] unsurprising but reasonably strong results". Evan Davies from NOW gave the album NNN out of NNN saying that "Overall, as safe as Highway might be, there's no way long-time fans won't buy it". Rob Sheffield from Rolling Stone gave the album 3 stars out of 5 stating that "Lost Highway moves in on Nashville as shrewdly as "It's My Life" skimmed Stockholm seven years ago". Luke Turner from Yahoo! Music UK gave the album 7 stars out 10 saying that "Love it or hate it, "Lost Highway" will be joining supersize 7-11 sodas and loud bumper stickers as the accessory of choice for drivers across America this summer".

After its first week on sale, Lost Highway entered the Dutch, German, Swiss, and Japanese album charts at No. 1, and the UK Album Chart at No. 2, below The Traveling Wilburys Collection. It entered the Irish and Australian charts at No. 5, although after the conclusion of Bon Jovi's Australian tour the album climbed to No. 2. In Japan, the album debuted at No. 1 and sold 73,212 copies in its first week of release on Oricon charts. This is the fourth such time, breaking The Beatles and the Bay City Rollers' record as a Western band (under Oricon's definition) of having three number one albums in the country. In the UK the album sold 79,000 copies in its first week, an improvement on Have a Nice Day's first-week sales of 54,000. In Denmark, the album debuted at No. 5, but went to No. 1 after five weeks on the charts. In the U.S., the album debuted at number one on the Billboard 200 with 292,000 copies sold in its first week. The album was certified platinum by the RIAA in October 2008.

== Track listing ==
No.	Title	Writer(s)	Producer	Length
1.	"Lost Highway"	Jon Bon Jovi; Richie Sambora; John Shanks	John Shanks	4:13
2.	"Summertime"	Bon Jovi; Sambora; Shanks	John Shanks	3:17
3.	"(You Want to) Make a Memory"	Bon Jovi; Sambora; Desmond Child	Dann Huff	4:36
4.	"Whole Lot of Leavin'"	Bon Jovi; Shanks	John Shanks	4:16
5.	"We Got It Going On" (featuring Big & Rich)	Bon Jovi; Sambora; Big Kenny; John Rich	Dann Huff	4:13
6.	"Any Other Day"	Bon Jovi; Sambora; Gordie Sampson	Dann Huff	4:01
7.	"Seat Next to You"	Bon Jovi; Sambora; Hillary Lindsey	Dann Huff	4:21
8.	"Everybody's Broken"	Bon Jovi; Billy Falcon	John Shanks	4:11
9.	"Till We Ain't Strangers Anymore" (featuring LeAnn Rimes)	Bon Jovi; Sambora; Brett James	Dann Huff	4:43
10.	"The Last Night"	Bon Jovi; Sambora; Shanks	John Shanks	3:32
11.	"One Step Closer"	Bon Jovi; Sambora; Shanks	John Shanks	3:35
12.	"I Love This Town"	Bon Jovi; Sambora; Falcon	Dann Huff	4:36
Total length:				49:57

2010 special edition bonus tracks
No.	Title	Writer(s)	Length
13.	"Lost Highway" (live)	Bon Jovi; Sambora; Shanks	4:07
14.	"We Got It Going On" (live)	Bon Jovi; Sambora; Kenny; Rich	4:23
15.	"Any Other Day" (live)	Bon Jovi; Sambora; Sampson	5:52
16.	"I Love This Town" (live)	Bon Jovi; Sambora; Falcon	4:55

Australian, New Zealand, and UK bonus track
No.	Title	Writer(s)	Length
13.	"Lonely"	Bon Jovi; Child; Darrell Brown	3:55

Japan bonus tracks
No.	Title	Writer(s)	Length
13.	"Lonely"	Bon Jovi; Child; Brown	3:55
14.	"Put the Boy Back in Cowboy"	Bon Jovi	3:59

U.S. iTunes bonus tracks
No.	Title	Writer(s)	Length
13.	"(You Want to) Make a Memory" (Pop edited version)	Bon Jovi; Sambora; Child	4:07
14.	"(You Want to) Make a Memory" (Live at the Cannery Ballroom)	Bon Jovi; Sambora; Child	4:16

U.S. iTunes bonus tracks (pre-order)
No.	Title	Writer(s)	Length
13.	"(You Want to) Make a Memory" (Live at the Cannery Ballroom)	Bon Jovi; Sambora; Child	4:16
14.	"Lost Highway" (Live at the Cannery Ballroom)	Bon Jovi; Sambora; Shanks	4:13

U.S. Target bonus tracks
No.	Title	Writer(s)	Length
13.	"Walk Like a Man"	Bon Jovi	4:29
14.	"I Love This Town" (Live from the Cannery Ballroom)	Bon Jovi; Sambora; Falcon	4:47

Walmart Soundcheck bonus DVD
No.	Title	Writer(s)	Length
1.	"Who Says You Can't Go Home"	Bon Jovi; Sambora
2.	"It's My Life"	Bon Jovi; Sambora; Max Martin
3.	"Lost Highway"	Bon Jovi; Sambora; Shanks
4.	"(You Want to) Make a Memory"	Bon Jovi; Sambora; Child
5.	"Wanted Dead or Alive"	Bon Jovi; Sambora

European Tour Edition: Lost Highway: The Concert bonus CD
No.	Title	Writer(s)	Length
1.	"Lost Highway"	Bon Jovi; Sambora; Shanks	4:34
2.	"Summertime"	Bon Jovi; Sambora; Shanks	3:24
3.	"(You Want To) Make a Memory"	Bon Jovi; Sambora; Child	4:48
4.	"Whole Lot of Leavin'"	Bon Jovi; Shanks	4:31
5.	"We Got It Going On"	Bon Jovi; Sambora; Kenny; Rich	4:25
6.	"Any Other Day"	Bon Jovi; Sambora; Sampson	7:59
7.	"Seat Next to You"	Bon Jovi; Sambora; Lindsey	4:34
8.	"Everybody's Broken"	Bon Jovi; Falcon	4:20
9.	"Till We Ain't Strangers Anymore"	Bon Jovi; Sambora; James	5:18
10.	"The Last Night"	Bon Jovi; Sambora; Shanks	3:37
11.	"One Step Closer"	Bon Jovi; Sambora; Shanks	3:41
12.	"I Love This Town"	Bon Jovi; Sambora; Falcon	5:05
13.	"It's My Life"	Bon Jovi; Sambora; Martin	4:06
14.	"Wanted Dead or Alive"	Bon Jovi; Sambora	5:26

Australia, New Zealand and Japan Tour Edition: Stripped: Raw and Real bonus CD
No.	Title	Writer(s)	Length
1.	"Hallelujah" (Leonard Cohen cover; live)	Leonard Cohen	6:02
2.	"(You Want To) Make a Memory"	Bon Jovi; Sambora; Child	4:24
3.	"Lost Highway"	Bon Jovi; Sambora; Shanks	4:12
4.	"Wanted Dead or Alive"	Bon Jovi; Sambora	5:08
5.	"Who Says You Can't Go Home"	Bon Jovi; Sambora	4:50
6.	"Whole Lot of Leavin'"	Bon Jovi; Shanks	4:05

Japan special edition bonus DVD
No.	Title	Writer(s)	Length
1.	"Bon Jovi in the Studio Making "Lost Highway" in Nashville"
2.	"Bon Jovi on the Set of the Video Shoot for "(You Want to) Make a Memory""
3.	"(You Want to) Make a Memory" (Music video)	Bon Jovi; Sambora; Child
4.	"(You Want to) Make a Memory" (Live Walmart performance)	Bon Jovi; Sambora; Child

== Personnel ==
As listed in the liner notes.

Bon Jovi

- Jon Bon Jovi – lead and backing vocals
- Richie Sambora – guitars, talk box on "We Got It Going On", backing vocals
- David Bryan – keyboards
- Tico Torres – drums, percussion

Additional personnel

- Hugh McDonald – bass guitar
- Big & Rich – guest vocals on "We Got It Going On"
- John Catchings – cello
- Daniel Chase – keyboards, programming
- Eric Darken – percussion
- Dan Dugmore – pedal steel guitar
- Paul Franklin – pedal steel guitar
- Carl Gorodetzky – violin
- Kurt Johnston – pedal steel guitar, backing vocals
- Charlie Judge – conductor, programming, string arrangements, synthesizer
- Greg Leisz – pedal steel guitar
- Hillary Lindsey – backing vocals on "Seat Next to You"
- Steve Nathan – piano, Hammond B-3 organ
- Carole Rabinowitz-Neuen – cello
- LeAnn Rimes – duet vocals on "Till We Ain't Strangers Anymore"
- Pam Sixfin – violin
- Kris Wilkinson – viola
- Jonathan Yudkin – conductor, string arrangements, accordion, fiddle
- Gary McGrath – NRG assigned engineer

== Charts ==
=== Weekly charts ===
Weekly chart performance for Lost Highway
Chart (2007)	Peak position
Argentine Albums (CAPIF)	3
Australian Albums (ARIA)	2
Austrian Albums (Ö3 Austria)	1
Belgian Albums (Ultratop Flanders)	7
Belgian Albums (Ultratop Wallonia)	44
Canadian Albums (Billboard)	1
Danish Albums (Hitlisten)	1
Dutch Albums (Album Top 100)	1
European Albums (Billboard)	1
Finnish Albums (Suomen virallinen lista)	3
French Albums (SNEP)	39
German Albums (Offizielle Top 100)	1
Hungarian Albums (MAHASZ)	3
Italian Albums (FIMI)	10
Irish Albums (IRMA)	5
Japanese Albums (Oricon)	1
New Zealand Albums (RMNZ)	2
Norwegian Albums (VG-lista)	7
Portuguese Albums (AFP)	16
Scottish Albums (Official Charts)	2
Spanish Albums (Promusicae)	2
Swedish Albums (Sverigetopplistan)	4
Swiss Albums (Schweizer Hitparade)	1
Taiwanese Albums (Five Music)	1
UK Albums (Official Charts)	2
US Billboard 200	1
US Top Rock Albums (Billboard)	1

=== Year-end charts ===
2007 year-end chart performance for Lost Highway
Chart (2007)	Position
Australian Albums (ARIA)	92
Austrian Albums (Ö3 Austria)	13
Belgian Albums (Ultratop Flanders)	68
Dutch Albums (Album Top 100)	66
German Albums (Offizielle Top 100)	15
Swedish Albums (Sverigetopplistan)	85
Swiss Albums (Schweizer Hitparade)	17
UK Albums (OCC)	92
US Billboard 200	49
US Top Rock Albums (Billboard)	9

2008 year-end chart performance for Lost Highway
Chart (2008)	Position
US Billboard 200	160

== Certifications ==
Certifications and sales for Lost Highway
Region	Certification	Certified units/sales
Australia (ARIA)	Gold	35,000^{^}
Austria (IFPI Austria)	2× Platinum	40,000^{*}
Canada (Music Canada)	3× Platinum	300,000^{^}
Denmark (IFPI Danmark)	Gold	15,000^{^}
Germany (BVMI)	Platinum	200,000^{^}
Hungary (MAHASZ)	Gold	3,000^{^}
Ireland (IRMA)	Gold	7,500^{^}
Japan (RIAJ)	Gold	100,000^{^}
New Zealand (RMNZ)	Gold	7,500^{^}
Russia (NFPF)	Gold	10,000^{*}
Spain (Promusicae)	Gold	40,000^{^}
Switzerland (IFPI Switzerland)	Platinum	30,000^{^}
United Kingdom (BPI)	Gold	100,000^{^}
United States (RIAA)	Platinum	1,000,000^{^}
^{*} Sales figures based on certification alone.^{^} Shipments figures based on certification alone.

== Release history ==
Region	Date
Germany	June 8, 2007
United Kingdom	June 11, 2007
Japan	June 14, 2007
World	June 18, 2007
United States	June 19, 2007
