= Lorenza Ponce =

American violinist and string arranger

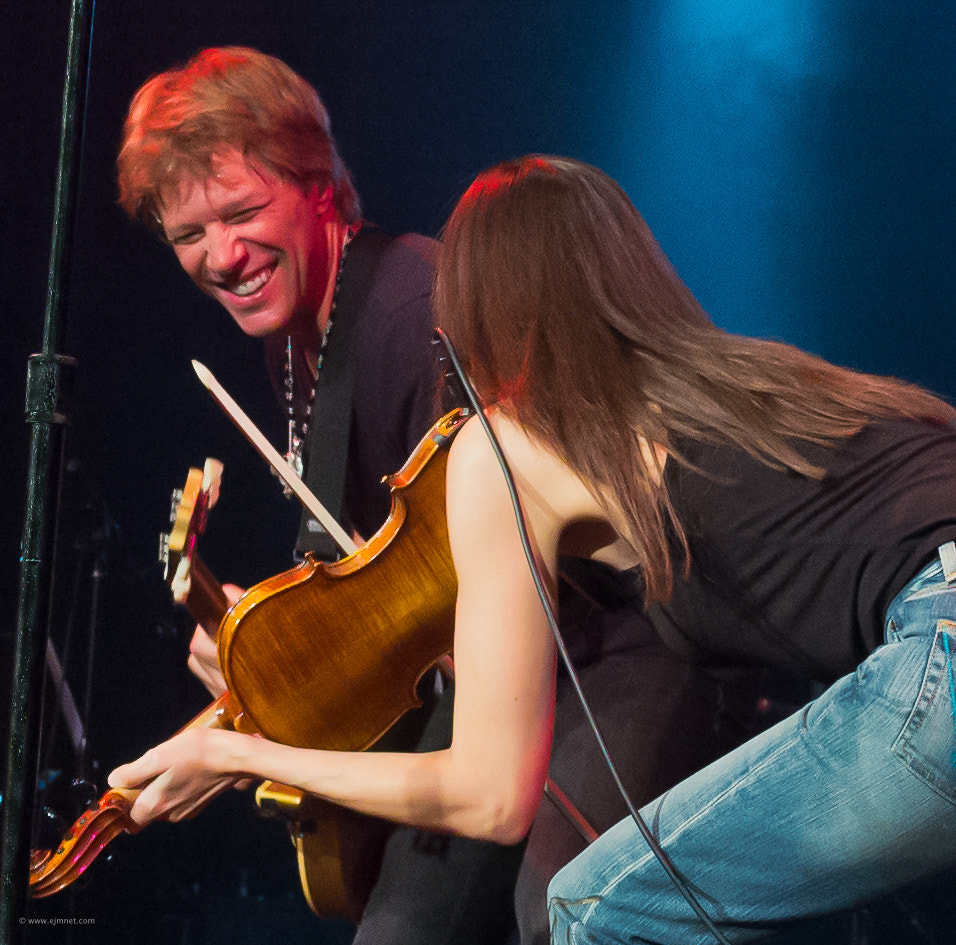
Ponce (right) and Jon Bon Jovi performing with Bon Jovi in 2011

Lorenza Ponce is an American violinist and string arranger. She has recorded six albums of her own music and has collaborated with other musicians, most notably as a touring musician with Sheryl Crow, The Dixie Chicks, Kitaro, Ben Folds Five, Hall and Oates, Bon Jovi and a member of the Jon Bon Jovi (solo) acoustic group.

== Notable Live Performance Collaborations ==
Adele	Live In New York City – violin	Neil Young	The Bridge School Benefit – violin
Katy Perry	Harpers Bazaar ICONS – violin	Sheryl Crow	World Tour – string arranger/violin/guitar
Sam Smith	US Promotion and Television – violin/string contractor	Sarah McLachlan	Lilith Fair – violin
Bon Jovi	Lost Highway World Tour – violin/viola/vocals	John Tesh	US Tour – violin/vocals
Bon Jovi	Live in Central Park – violin/vocals/viola	Ben Folds Five	Horde Tour – violin
Hall & Oates	US/Canada Tour – violin/string leader	Kitaro	World Tour – featured violinist
Sheryl Crow	Wildflower US/Canada Tour – string arranger/violin	Debbie Harry	CBGB – violin
The Dixie Chicks	Top of the World Tour – string arranger/violin

== Recording/String Arranger ==
- Bon Jovi Burning Bridges “Blind Love” – string arrangement/violin/viola/cello
- Carly Simon “You Don’t Know Hurt” (on Listen: Our Time Theater Company – various artists) – string arrangement/violin
- Megan McCauley Better Than Blood – string arrangement/contractor/conductor
- The Cringe Tipping Point – string arrangements/contractor/conductor
- Bon Jovi MTV Unplugged – string arrangement (“Livin’ On A Prayer”), violin/vocals/viola/string contractor
- Dixie Chicks Mary Had A Little Amp “Rainbow Connection” – string arranger/violin
- Dixie Chicks Top Of The World – string arranger/leader/violin
- Sheryl Crow C'mon, C'mon – string arrangements/conductor/violin
- Dixie Chicks Home “Landslide” single – string arrangement/leader/violin
- Sheryl Crow I Am Sam Soundtrack “Mother Nature’s Son” – string arrangement/leader/violin
- John Tesh One World PBS Special – violin/vocals
- Jon Anderson Deseo - Amor Real and Midnight Dancing - Violin

== Discography ==
- Christmas World! – Melodia Records 2014
- Soul Shifter – Melodia Records 2010
- The Song of Songs (w. Ben Zebelman) – Spring Hill Music 2002
- The Instrumentals – Melodia Records 2002
- Mystic Fiddler – Melodia Records 2001
- Imago – EMI/Angel Records 1997

== Soundtrack Contributions ==
- Cool Women Warner Entertainment Beloved From Mystic Fiddler
- Lani Loa Chrome Dragon Films Salvation From Imago
- Swift Justice UPN The Road to Hasedera From Imago
