= (You Want to) Make a Memory =

2007 single by Bon Jovi

Single by Bon Jovi

from the album Lost Highway
- B-side: "I Love This Town" (live); "Whole Lot of Leaving" (live); "(You Want to) Make a Memory" (instrumental); "Put the Boy Back in Cowboy"
- Released: March 20, 2007
- Recorded: 2007
- Length: 4:05 (radio edit); 4:36 (album version)
- Label: Island; Mercury Nashville
- Songwriters: Jon Bon Jovi; Richie Sambora; Desmond Child

Bon Jovi singles chronology
"Who Says You Can't Go Home" (2006)	"(You Want to) Make a Memory" (2007)	"Lost Highway" (2007)

Music video
- "(You Want to) Make a Memory" on YouTube

"(You Want to) Make a Memory" is a song by American rock band Bon Jovi, which was released as the first single from their tenth studio album Lost Highway (2007). Written by Jon Bon Jovi, Richie Sambora and Desmond Child, it was released for radio airplay on March 20, 2007, and for download on the US iTunes Store on April 17, 2007. The song is a ballad, and was performed at several nationally-televised events in an effort to promote the single. "(You Want to) Make a Memory" peaked at number 27 in the United States, making it Bon Jovi's last single to break the Top 40 on the Hot 100.

Two different versions of the song were released as singles. In every market except the U.S., the 'pop version' from the album was the single; in the U.S., however, a special 'country version' was released, which featured more instruments and a slightly different arrangement.

The song received a nomination at the 2008 Grammy Awards for Best Pop Performance by a Duo/Group with Vocals.

== Background ==
Jon Bon Jovi came up with the title, music and most of the lyrics. Later he finished the lyrics with Desmond Child and Richie Sambora contributing a couple of lines in the lyrics. They finished the song in a couple of hours. While recording the song, Jon sat alone with Dann Huff in the booth playing acoustic guitar. Vocals, guitars, rhythm guitars and other parts were recorded the following day.

"The beauty of '(You Want to) Make a Memory' is that it has the same feeling as 'Livin' on a Prayer'," noted Jon Bon Jovi in 2007. "Like we're starting in a whole new place again. I'll call it 'art' if it falls on its face and 'genius' if it works."

The video for the song was directed by Kevin Kerslake and shot in a bar called Layla's. Its storyline is based on the movie Ghost (1990) and is about a couple who is not together anymore. It was also inspired by the troubles Richie Sambora was going through in his own personal life at the time, such as the divorce with Heather Locklear, the custody battle in the middle of an alcohol addiction, and having lost his father to cancer. CMT hosted the exclusive on-air and Wireless premieres of the video on Thursday, May 3, 2007. Video made its television world premiere on CMT's Top 20 Countdown and later bowed on CMT Mobile. The video was also available for free streaming at CMT's official website. That episode of CMT's Top 20 Countdown aired again on Friday, May 4, 2007 at 1:30 p.m. E.T./P.T.

Announced as the first single from Lost Highway on March 19, 2007, the song was released to radio stations on March 20, 2007. On the same day it was put on a stream on a band's official website. In the week of March 19, 2007, there were 185,000 streams of the song on band's website. For those who pre-ordered Lost Highway from May 10, 2007, iTunes Store offered an instant download of "(You Want to) Make a Memory" and live versions of "(You Want to) Make a Memory" and "Lost Highway" recorded at the Cannery Ballroom in Nashville.

Sven Philipp from Billboard gave a positive review: "Over a pulsing crescendo of acoustic guitars, piano and strings, Bon Jovi delivers his most soulful vocal in years, sounding relaxed and nostalgic as he offers '80s-soaked lines". Mike Kerwick from North Jersey Media Group stated "'Make a Memory' may not be as good as some of the band's all-time-great ballads ('Always' and "Bed of Roses" come to mind), but its steady build from beginning to end makes it worth a spin. It gets better with each progressive listen". Donald Gibson from Blogcritics said the song "covers much of the same ground, musically and thematically, as 'Bed of Roses'". Craig Semon from Telegram & Gazette called it "a well-crafted pop song that's not afraid to be gooey and sentimental. With cushiony orchestration interspersed with sparkling guitar notes, the song builds gradually in its intensity and seductive charm". Ben Ratliff from The New York Times said that song "appeal[s] directly to a love interest; true to form, Mr. Bon Jovi employs the word 'baby' every time".

== Track listing ==
European CD single
No.	Title	Writer(s)	Length
1.	"(You Want to) Make a Memory" (Pop Version Edit)	Jon Bon Jovi, Richie Sambora, Desmond Child	4:05
2.	"I Love This Town" (Recorded live at Cannery Ballroom, Nashville on March 1, 2007)	Bon Jovi, Sambora, Billy Falcon	4:47
Total length:			8:54

European CD maxi single
No.	Title	Writer(s)	Length
1.	"(You Want to) Make a Memory" (Country Version Edit)	Bon Jovi, Sambora, Child	4:05
2.	"I Love This Town" (Recorded live at Cannery Ballroom, Nashville on March 1, 2007)	Bon Jovi, Sambora, Falcon	4:47
3.	"Put the Boy Back in Cowboy"	Bon Jovi	3:59
4.	"(You Want to) Make a Memory" (Music Video)	Bon Jovi, Sambora, Child	4:15
Total length:			17:07

Japanese CD single
No.	Title	Writer(s)	Length
1.	"(You Want to) Make a Memory"	Bon Jovi, Sambora, Child	4:05
2.	"I Love This Town" (Recorded live at Cannery Ballroom, Nashville on March 1, 2007)	Bon Jovi, Sambora, Falcon	4:47
3.	"Whole Lot of Leavin'" (Recorded live at Cannery Ballroom, Nashville on March 1, 2007)	Bon Jovi, John Shanks	4:21
4.	"(You Want to) Make a Memory" (Karaoke Version)	Bon Jovi, Sambora, Child	4:36
Total length:			17:49

United Kingdom CD single
No.	Title	Writer(s)	Length
1.	"(You Want to) Make a Memory" (Pop Version Edit)	Bon Jovi, Sambora, Child	4:05
2.	"Put the Boy Back In Cowboy"	Bon Jovi	3:59
Total length:			8:06

United Kingdom limited 7" single

Side A
No.	Title	Length
1.	"(You Want to) Make a Memory" (Pop Version Edit)	4:05
Total length:		4:05

Side B
No.	Title	Writer(s)	Length
2.	"I Love This Town" (Recorded live at Cannery Ballroom, Nashville on March 1, 2007)	Bon Jovi, Sambora, Falcon	4:47
Total length:			4:47

== Charts and certifications ==
=== Weekly charts ===
Chart (2007)	Peak position
Austria (Ö3 Austria Top 40)	3
Belgium (Ultratip Bubbling Under Flanders)	13
Canada Hot 100 (Billboard)	4
Canada CHR/Top 40 (Billboard)	36
Canada Hot AC (Billboard)	4
Czech Republic Airplay (ČNS IFPI)	28
Europe (Eurochart Hot 100)	16
Finland (Suomen virallinen lista)	9
Germany (GfK)	5
Netherlands (Dutch Top 40)	14
Netherlands (Single Top 100)	9
Italy (FIMI)	6
Scottish Singles Sales (Official Charts)	9
Slovakia Airplay (ČNS IFPI)	42
Switzerland (Schweizer Hitparade)	5
UK Singles (Official Charts)	33
UK Rock & Metal (Official Charts)	1
US Billboard Hot 100	27
US Adult Contemporary (Billboard)	5
US Adult Pop Airplay (Billboard)	8
US Hot Country Songs (Billboard)	35
US Pop 100 (Billboard)	28

=== Year-end charts ===
Chart (2007)	Position
Austria (Ö3 Austria Top 40)	27
Germany (Official German Charts)	62
Switzerland (Schweizer Hitparade)	56
US Adult Contemporary (Billboard)	18
US Adult Top 40 (Billboard)	30

=== Certifications ===
Region	Certification	Certified units/sales
United States (RIAA)	Gold	500,000^{^}
^{^} Shipments figures based on certification alone.

== Release history ==
Region	Date	Label	Format	Catalog
Europe	May 25, 2007	Island	CD	0602517359710
Japan	June 6, 2007	Island	CD	UICL-5022
United Kingdom	June 25, 2007	Mercury	CD	1737482
United Kingdom	June 25, 2007	Mercury	7" vinyl	1736418
