= Billy Falcon =

American singer-songwriter

- Born: July 13, 1955 (age 70); Valley Stream, New York, United States
- Genres: Rock; alternative rock; country rock; punk rock; pop punk
- Years active: 1964–present

Billy Falcon (born July 13, 1956) is an American musician, composer and music producer. He released rock albums throughout the late 1970s and 1980s, as well as appearing on The Way International's "High Country Caravan". He is currently active in the Nashville, Tennessee, area with the band The Sowing Circle.

== Career ==
He signed his first record contract with a major label at age 18. Falcon, a prolific writer, considers himself a "reporter" of his life experiences in lyrics and melodies.

Pretty Blue World, released in 1991, produced Falcon's highest-charting single, "Power Windows", which broke into the Top 40. The same album contains "Heaven’s Highest Hill", which articulates the pain of having to tell his three-year-old daughter that her mother had died, echoing the true-life event of the loss of his wife Myla to breast cancer.

He signed a deal with Mercury Records after Jon Bon Jovi contacted him about working together in the early 1990s. Falcon has co-written over thirty songs on several Bon Jovi albums. "Give in to Me", co-written with Falcon's daughter Rose and Elisha Hoffman, is featured in the Sony Pictures film Country Strong and performed by Faith Hill on the film's soundtrack. Other songs he has written have been covered by Stevie Nicks, Cher, Manfred Mann, Sherrie Austin, Meat Loaf and Trace Adkins. Over his career, Falcon has released more than a dozen albums.

Falcon has lived in Nashville for the past 19 years. Over the past four years, he has performed with the band The Sowing Circle and continues to write, perform, record and produce albums for artists, including his daughter.

== Discography ==
Albums

- 1977 Billy Falcon's Burning Rose
- 1979 Billy Falcon (a.k.a. Improper Attire)
- 1979 Priceless EP (as Billy Falcon Group)
- 1980 Falcon Around
- 1983 School of Hard Knocks EP (as Billy & Myla)
- 1986 Spark in the Dark
- 1988 Haunted Guitar
- 1991 Pretty Blue World
- 1994 Letters From A Paper Ship
- 2003 Songs About Girls
- 2004 Released (recorded in 1995)
- 2006 Made Man
- 2011 WHEN
- 2018 Holy Fire

Singles

Year	Song	US	Album
1977	"Friday Night"	—	Billy Falcon's Burning Rose
1977	"Sail Away"	—	Billy Falcon's Burning Rose
1978	"Sailor Boy"	—	Billy Falcon's Burning Rose
1980	"Rocks in His Head"	—	Falcon Around
1980	"I Never Did It With Him"	—	Falcon Around
1983	"There's Nothing to Do Today"	—	School of Hard Knocks EP
1983	"In the Arms of Love"	—	School of Hard Knocks EP
1987	"What Kind of Love Is This"	—	Haunted Guitar
1988	"Haunted Guitar"	—	Haunted Guitar
1988	"Spark in the Dark"	—	Haunted Guitar
1991	"Power Windows"	35	Pretty Blue World
1991	"Heaven's Highest Hill"	—	Pretty Blue World
1991	"Married in the Morning"	—	Pretty Blue World
1994	"I Like How It Feels"	—	Paper Ship
2021	"Never Surrender"	—	

== Songwriting credits ==
Stevie Nicks

- Timespace: The Best of Stevie Nicks (1991)
  - "Sometimes It's a Bitch" [Jon Bon Jovi, Billy Falcon]

Bon Jovi

- Crush (2000)
  - "Just Older" [Jon Bon Jovi, Billy Falcon]
  - "Mystery Train" [Jon Bon Jovi, Billy Falcon]
  - "Say It Isn't So" [Bon Jovi, Billy Falcon]
  - "I Could Make a Living Out of Lovin' You" [Jon Bon Jovi, Richie Sambora, Billy Falcon]
- Bounce (2002)
  - "Bounce" [Jon Bon Jovi, Richie Sambora, Billy Falcon]
  - "Undivided [Jon Bon Jovi, Richie Sambora, Billy Falcon]
- 100,000,000 Bon Jovi Fans Can't Be Wrong (2004)
  - "These Arms Are Open All Night" [Jon Bon Jovi, Billy Falcon]
  - "Kidnap an Angel" [Jon Bon Jovi, Billy Falcon]
  - "Another Reason to Believe" [Jon Bon Jovi, Richie Sambora, Billy Falcon, J. Steele]
  - "Last Man Standing" [Jon Bon Jovi, Billy Falcon]
- Have a Nice Day (2005)
  - "Last Man Standing" [Jon Bon Jovi, Billy Falcon]
  - "Story of My Life" [Jon Bon Jovi, Billy Falcon]
  - "Complicated" [Jon Bon Jovi, Billy Falcon, Max Martin]
- Lost Highway (2007)
  - "Everybody's Broken [Jon Bon Jovi, Billy Falcon]
  - "I Love This Town" [Jon Bon Jovi, Richie Sambora; Billy Falcon]
- The Circle (2009)
  - "When We Were Beautiful" [Billy Falcon Jon Bon Jovi, Richie Sambora]
  - "Superman Tonight" [Billy Falcon, Jon Bon Jovi]
  - "Love's the Only Rule" [Billy Falcon, Jon Bon Jovi]
- What About Now (2013)
  - "Because We Can" [Billy Falcon, Jon Bon Jovi, Richie Sambora]
  - "Amen" [Billy Falcon, Jon Bon Jovi]
  - "That's What the Water Made Me" [Billy Falcon, Jon Bon Jovi]
  - "What's Left of Me" [Billy Falcon, Jon Bon Jovi, Richie Sambora]
  - "Beautiful World" [Billy Falcon, Jon Bon Jovi]
  - "With These Two Hands" [Billy Falcon, Jon Bon Jovi]
  - "Into the Echo" [Billy Falcon, Jon Bon Jovi]
- Burning Bridges (2015)
  - "A Teardrop to the Sea" [Jon Bon Jovi, Billy Falcon]
  - "Who Would You Die For" [Jon Bon Jovi, Billy Falcon]
  - "Fingerprints" [Jon Bon Jovi, Billy Falcon]
  - "Life Is Beautiful" [Jon Bon Jovi, Billy Falcon]
- This House Is Not for Sale (2016)
  - "This House Is Not for Sale" [Jon Bon Jovi, John Shanks, Billy Falcon]
  - "Labor of Love" [Jon Bon Jovi, John Shanks, Billy Falcon]
  - "Born Again Tomorrow" [Jon Bon Jovi, John Shanks, Billy Falcon]
  - "New Year's Day" [Jon Bon Jovi, Billy Falcon]
  - "The Devil's in the Temple" [Jon Bon Jovi, Billy Falcon]
  - "Scars on This Guitar" [Jon Bon Jovi, Brett James, Billy Falcon]
  - "Real Love" [Jon Bon Jovi, Billy Falcon]
  - "I Will Drive You Home" [Jon Bon Jovi, Billy Falcon, Luke Laird]
  - "Touch of Grey" [Jon Bon Jovi, Brett James, Billy Falcon]
  - "Color Me In" [Jon Bon Jovi, Billy Falcon]

Bon Jovi 2020

- Shine [Jon Bon Jovi, John Shanks, Billy Falcon]
- Limitless [Jon Bon Jovi, John Shanks, Billy Falcon]
- Luv Can [Jon Bon Jovi, Billy Falcon]
- Beautiful Drug [Jon Bon Jovi, John Shanks, Billy Falcon]

Faith Hill

- Country Strong: Original Motion Picture Soundtrack (2010)
  - "Give in to Me" [Billy & Rose Falcon, Elisha Hoffman]

Meat Loaf

- Hang Cool Teddy Bear (2010)
  - "Elvis in Vegas" [Billy Falcon, Desmond Child, Jon Bon Jovi]

== See also ==
- Rose Falcon
