= Lost Highway (Bon Jovi song) =

Single by Bon Jovi

from the album Lost Highway
- Released: September 21, 2007
- Studio: Henson, Hollywood; Starstruck, Nashville
- Genre: Country rock
- Length: 4:13
- Label: Island; Mercury Nashville
- Songwriters: Jon Bon Jovi; Richie Sambora; John Shanks
- Producer: John Shanks

Bon Jovi singles chronology
"(You Want To) Make a Memory" (2007)	"Lost Highway" (2007)	"Till We Ain't Strangers Anymore" (2007)

"Lost Highway" is a song by American rock band Bon Jovi. Written by Jon Bon Jovi, Richie Sambora and John Shanks, it is the first track on the album Lost Highway and was released in September 2007 as the album's second single. The song peaked at number 15 on the Billboard Adult Top 40 chart.

== Song information ==
When the band was writing the song, they took the title both from Hank Williams song and Nashville record company Lost Highway. As soon as they had arrived in Nashville they came up with the idea of the song, wrote it and recorded it in 48 hours. In the US, it peaked at No. 15 on the Adult Top 40 chart. A slightly different version of the title track "Lost Highway" was used in the movie Wild Hogs alongside another Bon Jovi song "Wanted Dead or Alive".

The song "Hallelujah" was the B-side track to the single and charted in its own right in the UK at number 177 from sales of music downloads.

== Music video ==
The video was directed by Anthony Bongiovi and Dave Robertson, featuring band members playing in a country bar and a young woman driving a Saturn Sky on the country road. Suddenly on the radio, she hears the announcement "Here is new one from Bon Jovi. It's 'Lost Highway'." There are also girl and a man on a chopper and family in the station wagon driving on the same road. After a while they all run into a traffic jam because of the road works. Soon they all become very frustrated, the woman in the Saturn Sky takes a map and finds a country road. She decides to turn around, hits the gas and heads toward the bar. Quickly the other drivers follow her, they all arrive in front of a country bar where Bon Jovi are playing. By the time they enter the bar, the band members had already left.

The exterior shots of the bar used in video are shots of the Iron Bull Sallon on Route 120 in Lakemoor, Illinois, and the interior of the bar was shot in Berwyn.

== Releases ==
U.K. Promo CD Single (Mercury: LOSTHICJ1)
No.	Title	Writer(s)	Length
1.	"Lost Highway" (Album version)	Jon Bon Jovi, Richie Sambora, John Shanks	4:12
Total length:			4:12

European CD Single (Island: 602517476622)
No.	Title	Writer(s)	Length
1.	"Lost Highway" (Edited version)	Bon Jovi, Sambora, Shanks	4:02
2.	"Hallelujah" (Recorded live at Capitol Studios, Los Angeles, CA on May 1, 2007.)	Leonard Cohen	6:01
Total length:			10:03

European CD-Maxi Single (Island: 602517474352)
No.	Title	Writer(s)	Length
1.	"Lost Highway" (Edited version)	Bon Jovi, Sambora, Shanks	4:02
2.	"Hallelujah" (Recorded live at Capitol Studios, Los Angeles, CA on May 1, 2007.)	Cohen	6:01
3.	"Wanted Dead or Alive" (Recorded live at Capitol Studios, Los Angeles, CA on May 1, 2007.)	Bon Jovi, Sambora	5:05
4.	"Lost Highway" (Video)	Bon Jovi, Sambora, Shanks	4:10
Total length:			19:18

== Charts ==
Chart (2007)	Peak position
Austria (Ö3 Austria Top 40)	41
Canada Hot 100 (Billboard)	39
Czech Republic Airplay (ČNS IFPI)	69
Germany (GfK)	36
Slovakia Airplay (ČNS IFPI)	44
UK Singles Chart	117
US Adult Pop Airplay (Billboard)	15
