= Who Says You Can't Go Home =

2006 single by Bon Jovi

Single by Bon Jovi

from the album Have a Nice Day
- B-side: "Complicated" (live)
- Released: March 27, 2006
- Genre: Country rock
- Length: 4:40
- Label: Island; Mercury
- Songwriters: Jon Bon Jovi; Richie Sambora
- Producers: Jon Bon Jovi; John Shanks; Richie Sambora

Bon Jovi singles chronology
"Welcome to Wherever You Are" (2005)	"Who Says You Can't Go Home" (2006)	"(You Want to) Make a Memory" (2007)

Music video
- "Who Says You Can't Go Home" on YouTube

"Who Says You Can't Go Home" is a song that was written by Jon Bon Jovi and Richie Sambora for American rock band Bon Jovi's ninth album, Have a Nice Day (2005). The song was produced by John Shanks, Jon Bon Jovi and Richie Sambora. A duet version of the song featuring vocals from Jennifer Nettles of the American duo Sugarland was also shipped to country music radio. Both versions of the song feature on Have a Nice Day; the original version appears as the fourth track, while the duet version appears as the thirteenth and final track.

"Who Says You Can't Go Home" was released as the second single in North America in March 2006 and reached the top 30 on the US Billboard Hot 100, peaking at number 23. Outside North America, "Welcome to Wherever You Are" served as the second single, with "Who Says You Can't Go Home" being released as the album's third single on June 12, 2006. The song reached number five in the United Kingdom, becoming the band's second top-10 single from the album. The duet with Jennifer Nettles peaked at number one on the Billboard Hot Country Songs chart.

== Content ==
The lyrics of "Who Says You Can't Go Home" reflect Jon Bon Jovi's roots and passion for his hometown in New Jersey.

== Duet version ==
In the United States, a version of the song was released to the country music format as a duet with Jennifer Nettles, lead singer of the duo Sugarland. The country music version was originally recorded as a duet with Keith Urban, who also played banjo on the song. After Jon Bon Jovi decided that Urban's voice was too similar to his own, he asked a representative of Mercury Records to recommend a female duet partner. The duet version was performed on Saturday Night Live on October 13, 2007.

== Music videos ==
The music video for the country/Jennifer Nettles version, released in November 24, 2005, and directed by Jon's brother, Anthony M. Bongiovi, features Habitat for Humanity volunteers, including members of the Philadelphia Soul Arena Football League team owned in part by Jon Bon Jovi, building homes for low-income families and was used to promote the organization. It won an award for Best Collaborative Video at the CMT Music Awards in 2006.

The shooting of the music video for the regular version, featuring a man dressed up as a dog, began at the March 9, 2006 Bon Jovi concert at the Glendale Arena outside Phoenix and continued in the Los Angeles area. The video was released in the week of March 27, 2006. It was directed by Jeff Labbé through @radical.media, lensed by David Lanzenberg, and edited by Steve Prestemon.

== Awards and achievements ==
- Won award for "Best Collaborative Video" at the CMT Music Awards in 2006.
- Won award for "Favorite Rock Song" at the 33rd People's Choice Awards in 2007
- Won the Grammy Award for Best Country Collaboration with Vocals in 2007
- Song has been chosen to group best Country songs of the year - "ASCAP Country Music Awards" in 2006
- Nominated for "Music Event of the Year" at the Country Music Association Awards
- Nominated for "Vocal Event of the Year" at the Academy of Country Music Awards

== Track listings ==
UK CD1 and 7-inch picture disc

1. "Who Says You Can't Go Home" (radio edit)
2. "Complicated" (live in Boston, Massachusetts, December 10, 2005)

UK CD2

1. "Who Says You Can't Go Home"
2. "Last Man Standing" (live)
3. "Raise Your Hands" (live)
4. "Who Says You Can't Go Home" (video)

Digital download

1. "Who Says You Can't Go Home" (acoustic version) – 4:21

== Charts ==
=== Weekly charts ===
Chart (2005–2006)	Peak position
Austria (Ö3 Austria Top 40)	36
Canada AC (Billboard)	19
Canada Hot AC Top 30 (Radio & Records)	2
Canada Rock Top 30 (Radio & Records)	25
Europe (Eurochart Hot 100)	15
Germany (GfK)	54
Ireland (IRMA)	30
Netherlands (Dutch Top 40)	31
Netherlands (Single Top 100)	33
Scottish Singles Sales (Official Charts)	9
Slovakia Airplay (ČNS IFPI)	86
Switzerland (Schweizer Hitparade)	57
UK Singles (Official Charts)	5
US Billboard Hot 100	23
US Adult Contemporary (Billboard)	8
US Adult Pop Airplay (Billboard)	5
US Hot Country Songs (Billboard) Duet with Jennifer Nettles	1
US Pop Airplay (Billboard)	30

=== Year-end charts ===
Chart (2006)	Position
US Billboard Hot 100	71
US Adult Contemporary (Billboard)	11
US Adult Top 40 (Billboard)	19
US Hot Country Songs (Billboard)	9

== Release history ==
Region	Date	Format(s)	Label(s)	Ref.
United States	March 27, 2006	Contemporary hit radio	Island	
United Kingdom	June 12, 2006	CD	Mercury	
