= Live at Madison Square Garden (Bon Jovi album) =

Video by Bon Jovi
- Released: November 20, 2009 (Europe & Australia); November 23, 2009 (UK); November 25, 2009 (Japan); May 11, 2010 (US & Canada)
- Recorded: July 14 & July 15, 2008
- Venues: Madison Square Garden (New York City, NY)
- Genre: Rock
- Length: 143:17
- Label: Mercury
- Directors: Anthony Bongiovi and Brian Lockwood

Bon Jovi chronology
When We Were Beautiful	Live at Madison Square Garden (2009)	Greatest Hits - The Ultimate Video Collection (2010)

Professional ratings
Review scores
Source	Rating
Blu-ray.com	4/5
Classic Rock	3/10 stars

Live at Madison Square Garden is a fifth concert video by American band Bon Jovi from the last North American part of their Lost Highway Tour. It was recorded on July 14 and July 15, 2008, at Madison Square Garden. It was directed by Anthony Bongiovi and Brian Lockwood. It was released on DVD and Blu-ray on November 20, 2009, in Europe and Australia; November 23, 2009, in the UK; November 25, 2009, in Japan; and May 11, 2010, in the US and Canada.

== Track listing ==
No.	Title	Writer(s)	Length
1.	"Lost Highway"	Jon Bon Jovi; Richie Sambora; John Shanks	4:19
2.	"Born to Be My Baby"	Bon Jovi; Sambora; Desmond Child	5:09
3.	"Blaze of Glory"	Bon Jovi	6:07
4.	"It's My Life"	Bon Jovi; Sambora; Max Martin	3:45
5.	"Keep the Faith"	Bon Jovi; Sambora; Child	6:21
6.	"Raise Your Hands"	Bon Jovi; Sambora	4:53
7.	"Living in Sin" / "Chapel of Love"	Bon Jovi / Jeff Barry; Ellie Greenwich; Phil Spector	5:54
8.	"Always"	Bon Jovi	7:23
9.	"Whole Lot of Leavin'"	Bon Jovi; Shanks	5:04
10.	"In These Arms"	Bon Jovi; Sambora; David Bryan	6:25
11.	"We Got It Going On"	Bon Jovi; Sambora; Kenny Alphin; John Rich	4:44
12.	"I'll Be There for You" (Sambora on lead vocals)	Bon Jovi; Sambora	8:56
13.	"(You Want to) Make a Memory"	Bon Jovi; Sambora; Child	4:42
14.	"Blood on Blood (song)"	Bon Jovi; Sambora; Child	6:02
15.	"Dry County"	Bon Jovi	9:57
16.	"Have a Nice Day"	Bon Jovi; Sambora; Shanks	4:22
17.	"Who Says You Can't Go Home"	Bon Jovi; Sambora	6:05
18.	"Hallelujah"	Leonard Cohen	9:00
19.	"Wanted Dead or Alive"	Bon Jovi; Sambora	5:40
20.	"Livin' on a Prayer"	Bon Jovi; Sambora; Child	6:10
21.	"Bad Medicine" (Ending credits with audio only)	Bon Jovi; Sambora; Child	4:32

Bonus songs
No.	Title	Writer(s)	Length
22.	"You Give Love a Bad Name"	Bon Jovi; Sambora; Child	4:04
23.	"Runaway"	Bon Jovi; George Karak	5:10
24.	"Bed of Roses"	Bon Jovi	8:11

== Blu-ray edition ==
The Blu-ray edition features as an exclusive bonus feature the documentary When We Were Beautiful directed by Phil Griffin, that follows the band through their 2007/08 Lost Highway Tour.

== Technical notes ==
The European release of the concert video on a DVD and Blu-ray is in the PAL picture format and American release will have NTSC picture format. The sound is in 5.1 Dolby Digital Surround and in classic stereo.

== Personnel ==
- Jon Bon Jovi – lead vocals, acoustic guitar
- Richie Sambora – lead guitar, talk box, backing vocals
- David Bryan – keyboards, backing vocals
- Tico Torres – drums, percussion

with

- Hugh McDonald – bass, backing vocals
- Bobby Bandiera – rhythm guitar, backing vocals
- Lorenza Ponce – violin, backing vocals

== Charts ==
Chart (2009)	Peak position
Australian Music DVDs Chart	4
Austrian Music DVDs Chart	1
Belgian Music DVDs Chart (Flanders)	9
Czech Music DVDs Chart	12
German Albums Chart	35
Italian Music DVDs Chart	7
Dutch Music DVDs Chart	8
Portuguese Music DVDs Chart	9
Spanish Music DVDs Chart	8
Swiss Music DVDs Chart	5
UK Music DVDs Chart	10
US Music Video Chart	1
