= Bon Jovi Live =

2011 concert tour by Bon Jovi

- North American and European tour by Bon Jovi
- Promotional advertisement for Bon Jovi Live
- Location: North America, Europe
- Associated album: Greatest Hits
- Start date: February 9, 2011
- End date: July 31, 2011
- Legs: 2
- No. of shows: 35 in North America; 24 in Europe; 59 Total
- Box office: US $143 million ($204.66 in 2025 dollars)

Bon Jovi concert chronology
- The Circle Tour (2010); Bon Jovi Live (2011); Because We Can: The Tour (2013)

Bon Jovi Live was the fourteenth concert tour by American band, Bon Jovi. Visiting several countries in North America and Europe, the tour supported the band's sixth compilation album, The Greatest Hits. It follows The Circle Tour, which became the biggest tour of 2010. At the conclusion of 2011, the tour placed second on Billboard's annual, "Top 25 Tour", earning over $190 million with 68 shows.

== Background ==
In October 2010, Bon Jovi released the concert film, "The Circle Tour: Live From Jersey" in U.S. theaters. At the same time, the band announced the release of their latest greatest hits collection and their upcoming tour. Upon the release of the album, the new tour dates were announced as well. While touring Australia, it was announced that the "Circle Tour" became the biggest tour of 2010, grossing over $200 million. Commenting on the tour, Jon Bon Jovi stated,

"You can show up, but that doesn't mean the people are going to go, and that doesn't mean they're going to come the next time and the next time. […] The year's not over yet. I need to make it to July 31 and then look back. If it were over right now, I'd look back on the Circle run and happily say, 'Wow, it was a good year. I was unbelievably healthy, we did great business, we got along.' But it's not over. It's just the beginning of the third quarter, we've just taken the field. So I won't look back until we get to the end zone."

On April 28, 2011 it was announced that Richie Sambora would be absent from some shows enter rehabilitation for exhaustion and alcoholism, but the tour will continue with the rest of the band. Sambora was replaced by Canadian guitarist Theofilos Xenidis (known professionally as Phil X), beginning on April 30, 2011. On 6 June 2011, it was announced that Sambora would rejoin Bon Jovi for the remainder of the tour. In June 2011 Bon Jovi played two nights in the RDS Arena, Dublin, Ireland, performing to an audience of over 34,000 each night.

On June 17, 2011, Jon suffered an MCL sprain in his left knee while performing "Love's the only Rule" at the Helsinki, Finland concert. The incident was caught on a YouTube video and the pain he endured was quite obvious. It occurred in the first set about an hour into the show. Jon slipped because it had rained the whole evening and the stage was wet and slippery. Nine days later, he had surgery in Dublin, Ireland and played the Dublin show and several others with a knee brace. No shows were cancelled during this incident.

== Set list ==
1. Raise Your Hands
2. You Give Love a Bad Name
3. Born to Be My Baby
4. We Weren't Born to Follow
5. Lost Highway
6. It's My Life
7. Runaway
8. The More Things Change
9. We Got It Going On
10. Captain Crash & The Beauty Queen From Mars
11. Bad Medicine (with snippets of Oh, Pretty Woman)
12. Lay Your Hands on Me (Richie Sambora on lead vocals)
13. When We Were Beautiful
14. Bed of Roses
15. I'll Be There for You
16. Who Says You Can't Go Home
17. I'll Sleep When I'm Dead (with snippets of Start Me Up)
18. Someday I'll Be Saturday Night
19. Have a Nice Day
20. Keep the Faith

Encore

21. In These Arms
22. Wanted Dead or Alive
23. Blood on Blood (song)
24. Livin' on a Prayer

== Shows ==
List of concerts, showing date, city, country, venue, opening act, tickets sold, number of available tickets and amount of gross revenue
Date	City	Country	Venue	Opening act	Attendance	Revenue
North America
February 9, 2011	University Park	United States	Bryce Jordan Center	Lorenza Ponce	14,758 / 14,758	$1,157,850
February 11, 2011	Pittsburgh	United States	Consol Energy Center	Norman Nardini; Jimbo and the Soupbones	34,144 / 34,144	$2,923,374
February 12, 2011	Pittsburgh	United States	Consol Energy Center	Norman Nardini; Jimbo and the Soupbones	34,144 / 34,144	$2,923,374
February 14, 2011	Toronto	Canada	Air Canada Centre	Dean Lickyer; Frankie Whyte and the Dead Idols	36,681 / 36,681	$3,806,514
February 15, 2011	Toronto	Canada	Air Canada Centre	Dean Lickyer; Frankie Whyte and the Dead Idols	36,681 / 36,681	$3,806,514
February 18, 2011	Montreal	Canada	Bell Centre	—N/a	39,435 / 39,435	$3,726,141
February 19, 2011	Montreal	Canada	Bell Centre	—N/a	39,435 / 39,435	$3,726,141
February 21, 2011	Raleigh	United States	RBC Center	Billy Falcon	17,843 / 17,843	$1,655,016
February 24, 2011	New York City	United States	Madison Square Garden	—N/a	53,219 / 53,219	$7,003,552
February 25, 2011	New York City	United States	Madison Square Garden	—N/a	53,219 / 53,219	$7,003,552
February 27, 2011	Washington, D.C.	United States	Verizon Center	—N/a	17,908 / 17,908	$1,808,028
March 1, 2011	Boston	United States	TD Garden	—N/a	15,928 / 15,928	$1,675,208
March 2, 2011	Philadelphia	United States	Wells Fargo Center	Soraia	18,794 / 18,794	$1,841,830
March 4, 2011	Uncasville	United States	Mohegan Sun Arena	Lorenza Ponce	8,952 / 8,952	$1,537,472
March 5, 2011	New York City	United States	Madison Square Garden	—N/a	(Note: The score data is representative of the three shows in New York City, New York at the Madison Square Garden on February 24, February 25, and March 5 respectively.)	
March 8, 2011	Chicago	United States	United Center	The West Side	33,884 / 33,884	$3,241,671
March 9, 2011	Chicago	United States	United Center	The West Side	33,884 / 33,884	$3,241,671
March 17, 2011	San Antonio	United States	AT&T Center	Ryan Star	17,112 / 17,112	$1,571,364
March 19, 2011	Las Vegas	United States	MGM Grand Garden Arena	Ryan Star	15,136 / 15,136	$2,761,834
March 22, 2011	Salt Lake City	United States	EnergySolutions Arena	Ryan Star	17,146 / 17,146	$1,338,116
March 25, 2011	Vancouver	Canada	Rogers Arena	Ryan Star	34,672 / 34,672	$3,241,752
March 26, 2011	Vancouver	Canada	Rogers Arena	Ryan Star	34,672 / 34,672	$3,241,752
April 30, 2011	New Orleans	United States	Fair Grounds Race Course	—N/a	—N/a	—N/a
May 3, 2011	Ottawa	Canada	Scotiabank Place	—N/a	17,472 / 17,472	$1,361,048
May 4, 2011	Montreal	Canada	Bell Centre	—N/a	19,617 / 19,617	$1,752,071
May 6, 2011	Uniondale	United States	Nassau Coliseum	Lorenza Ponce	15,968 / 15,968	$1,621,898
May 7, 2011	Uncasville	United States	Mohegan Sun Arena	Lakshmi	8,997 / 8,997	$1,139,499
May 10, 2011	Columbus	United States	Nationwide Arena	—N/a	17,668 / 17,668	$1,566,850
May 12, 2011	Des Moines	United States	Wells Fargo Arena	—N/a	14,649 / 14,649	$1,234,198
May 14, 2011	Atlanta	United States	Philips Arena	—N/a	16,658 / 16,658	$1,649,543
May 15, 2011	Orlando	United States	Amway Center	—N/a	16,748 / 16,748	$1,622,547
May 17, 2011	Houston	United States	Toyota Center	—N/a	15,787 / 15,787	$1,351,764
May 19, 2011	Memphis	United States	FedExForum	Billy Falcon	15,912 / 15,912	$1,353,835
May 21, 2011	Milwaukee	United States	Bradley Center	—N/a	17,281 / 17,281	$1,390,393
May 22, 2011	St. Louis	United States	Scottrade Center	—N/a	20,648 / 20,648	$1,575,841
Europe
June 8, 2011	Zagreb	Croatia	Stadion Maksimir	The Breakers; Opća opasnost	33,698 / 33,698	$2,245,935
June 10, 2011	Dresden	Germany	Ostragehege	The Breakers; Unbuttoned Heart	24,049 / 24,049	$2,123,287
June 12, 2011	Munich	Germany	Olympiastadion	The Breakers	70,025 / 70,025	$5,450,997
June 15, 2011	Oslo	Norway	Ullevaal Stadion	Billy Falcon	31,521 / 31,521	$3,971,782
June 17, 2011	Helsinki	Finland	Helsinki Olympic Stadium	The Breakers; Block Buster	45,219 / 45,219	$4,863,623
June 19, 2011	Horsens	Denmark	CASA Arena Horsens	The Breakers; Moreish	30,803 / 30,803	$3,044,795
June 22, 2011	Edinburgh	Scotland	Murrayfield Stadium	Vintage Trouble Vale Verde	53,043 / 53,043	$4,227,618
June 24, 2011	Manchester	England	Lancashire County Cricket Grounds	Vintage Trouble; Xander and the Peace Pirates	42,737 / 42,737	$4,137,370
June 25, 2011	London	England	Hard Rock Calling	—N/a	—N/a	—N/a
June 27, 2011	Bristol	England	Ashton Gate	Vintage Trouble; Goldtrap	20,459 / 20,459	$2,105,072
June 29, 2011	Dublin	Ireland	RDS Arena	Vintage Trouble	68,144 / 68,144	$6,496,433
June 30, 2011	Dublin	Ireland	RDS Arena	Vintage Trouble	68,144 / 68,144	$6,496,433
July 8, 2011	Istanbul	Turkey	Türk Telekom Arena	Şebnem Ferah; Redd	40,723 / 40,723	$2,775,566
July 10, 2011	Bucharest	Romania	Piața Constituției	Stillborn; QuantiQ	53,030 / 53,030	$4,000,892
July 13, 2011	Düsseldorf	Germany	Esprit Arena	The Breakers	43,625 / 43,625	$3,446,927
July 14, 2011	Zürich	Switzerland	Letzigrund	Death By Chocolate	37,125 / 37,125	$5,324,955
July 16, 2011	Mannheim	Germany	Maimarktgelände	Vintage Trouble; The Rising Rocket	40,172 / 40,172	$3,242,820
July 17, 2011	Udine	Italy	Stadio Friuli	Flemt	39,926 / 39,926	$3,229,776
July 20, 2011	Athens	Greece	Olympic Stadium	The Breakers; Brothers in Plugs	60,652 / 60,652	$6,594,404
July 22, 2011	Vienna	Austria	Ernst-Happel-Stadion	The Breakers; Tyler Ernst	56,280 / 56,280	$4,950,762
July 24, 2011	Bruges	Belgium	Zeebrugge Beach	Arid; Billy The Kill	29,497 / 29,497	$2,711,036
July 27, 2011	Barcelona	Spain	Estadi Olímpic Lluís Companys	The Rebels; The Monomes	39,992 / 39,992	$3,021,325
July 29, 2011	San Sebastián	Spain	Anoeta Stadium	Rulo y La Contraband; The Rebels	34,798 / 34,798	$2,806,226
July 31, 2011	Lisbon	Portugal	Bela Vista Park	Klepht; Redlizzard	57,832 / 57,832	$4,811,609
TOTAL					1,519,598 / 1,519,598 (100%)	$142,977,988

== Personnel ==
Band

- Jon Bon Jovi - lead vocals, guitar, maracas for Keep the Faith, tambourine for Hey God
- Richie Sambora – lead guitar, lead vocals for Lay Your Hands on Me, backing vocals, talkbox
- David Bryan - keyboards, backing vocals
- Hugh McDonald – bass, backing vocals
- Tico Torres - drums, percussion, backing vocals for Love for Sale

Additional musicians

- Bobby Bandiera – rhythm guitar, backing vocals
- Phil X – lead guitar, backing vocals, talkbox (substitute for Richie Sambora from April 30 to May 22)
