= Greatest Hits: The Ultimate Video Collection =

Greatest Hits - The Ultimate Video Collection

Video by Bon Jovi
- Released: November 1, 2010
- Recorded: 1986–2010
- Genres: Rock, music video
- Length: 2:58:00
- Label: Mercury Records

Bon Jovi chronology
Live at Madison Square Garden (2009)	Greatest Hits - The Ultimate Video Collection (2010)

Greatest Hits - The Ultimate Video Collection is a DVD by rock band Bon Jovi, coinciding with the band's Greatest Hits compilation. It contains 17 of the band's most popular music videos and 17 corresponding live versions of those songs taken from various concerts. The majority of the live performances have previously been released on DVD.

The DVD is presented in 16x9 "Pillarbox" format and contain stereo and Dolby Digital 5.1 Surround sound audio.

== Track listing ==
=== Music Videos ===
1. "Livin' on a Prayer"
2. "You Give Love a Bad Name"
3. "In These Arms"
4. "Bad Medicine" (2nd version)
5. "Born to Be My Baby"
6. "I'll Be There for You"
7. "Lay Your Hands on Me"
8. "It's My Life"
9. "Always" (Band-only version/Single Edit)
10. "Wanted Dead or Alive"
11. "Bed of Roses"
12. "Who Says You Can't Go Home"
13. "Have a Nice Day"
14. "We Weren't Born to Follow"
15. "What Do You Got?"
16. "Keep the Faith"
17. "Blaze of Glory"

=== Live Performances ===
1. "Livin' on a Prayer" (from Live at Madison Square Garden)
2. "You Give Love a Bad Name" (from Live from London)
3. "In These Arms" (from Live at Madison Square Garden)
4. "Bad Medicine" (from Live from London)
5. "Born to Be My Baby" (from This Left Feels Right Live)
6. "I'll Be There for You" (from The Crush Tour)
7. "Lay Your Hands on Me" (from This Left Feels Right Live)
8. "It's My Life" (from Live at Madison Square Garden)
9. "Always" (from Live at Madison Square Garden)
10. "Wanted Dead or Alive" (from Lost Highway: The Concert)
11. "Bed of Roses" (from This Left Feels Right Live)
12. "Who Says You Can't Go Home" (from Lost Highway: The Concert)
13. "Have a Nice Day" (from Live at Madison Square Garden)
14. "We Weren't Born to Follow" (Live from London O2 Rooftop Gig)
15. "What Do You Got?" (Live from Peru)
16. "Keep the Faith" (from Live from London)
17. "Blaze of Glory" (from Live at Madison Square Garden)

== Technical Notes ==
The DVD is presented in 16:9 widescreen format.

The DVD has two audio tracks: Dolby Digital 2.0 Stereo and Dolby Digital 5.1 Surround Sound.

== Charts and certifications ==
=== Peak positions ===
Chart (2010)	Peak position
Argentine Music DVDs Chart	1
Australian Music DVDs Chart	2
Austrian Music DVDs Chart	2
Belgian Music DVDs Chart (Flanders)	5
Belgian Music DVDs Chart (Wallonia)	9
Czech DVDs Chart	10
Dutch Music DVDs Chart	5
Finnish Music DVD Chart	4
Italian Music DVDs Chart	8
New Zealand Music DVDs Chart	2
Portuguese DVDs Chart	4
Spanish Music DVDs Chart	6
Swedish Music DVDs Chart	5
Swiss DVDs Chart	8

=== Year-end charts ===
Chart (2010)	Rank
Australian Music DVDs Chart	5

=== Certifications ===
Region	Certification	Certified units/sales
Australia (ARIA)	2× Platinum	30,000^{^}
Brazil (Pro-Música Brasil)	Gold	15,000^{*}
New Zealand (RMNZ)	Platinum	5,000^{^}
^{*} Sales figures based on certification alone.^{^} Shipments figures based on certification alone.
