= This Left Feels Right =

Remix album by Bon Jovi
- Released: November 4, 2003
- Recorded: 2003
- Genres: Acoustic rock; pop rock
- Length: 51:10
- Labels: Island; Mercury
- Producers: Patrick Leonard; Jon Bon Jovi; Richie Sambora

Bon Jovi chronology
| Bounce (2002) | This Left Feels Right (2003) | 100,000,000 Bon Jovi Fans Can't Be Wrong (2004) |

Singles from This Left Feels Right
- 1. "It's My Life (2003)" Released: 2003

This Left Feels Right is a remix album by Bon Jovi, released in 2003, which includes acoustic versions of songs where the band recorded songs from previous albums. It charted at No. 14 on the Billboard 200. The album, described as a "trip down memory lane" by Jon Bon Jovi, features revamped versions of many of Bon Jovi's biggest hits, often in a more sombre style. Many of the band's '80s upbeat songs are presented as soulful ballads.

== Production ==
The music was recorded in 2003, and produced by Patrick Leonard, Jon Bon Jovi, and Richie Sambora. The album consists of new versions of the band's songs from previous albums. It's a "trip down memory lane" as Jon Bon Jovi described the album.

Two new songs, "Last Man Standing" and "Thief of Hearts", were written and recorded for inclusion of the album. "Last Man Standing" was a song revealing lead singer Jon Bon Jovi's anger toward the state of the music industry. Bon Jovi believed that it would become more difficult for artists to find success in the music industry. This was Bon Jovi's reason for later removing the two new songs from the album, however Last Man Standing was later reworked and turned into a much more heavy aggressive rock song for inclusion on Bon Jovi's 2005 studio album, Have a Nice Day, a somewhat opposite effect of the This Left Feels Right project.

== Release ==
The 2003 rendition of "Wanted Dead or Alive" was released as a promotional single and also had a video produced, which had the same format as "Wanted Dead or Alive (Live version)", which was a single from the One Wild Night Live 1985–2001 album.

For the Russian and CIS release Olivia d'Abo's part in Livin' on a Prayer was recorded by Russian superstar Alsou in Bon Jovi's studio. This version was played on Russian radio stations to promote the release and got positive reviews by Bon Jovi fans, but Olivia's version appeared on the Russian CD due to Universal Music Russia's decision.

The original version of "Last Man Standing" and "Thief of Hearts" were both later released as part of the box set 100,000,000 Bon Jovi Fans Can't Be Wrong and are also included as live versions on the This Left Feels Right Live DVD.

== Reception ==
Professional ratings
Review scores
| Source | Rating |
|---|---|
| Allmusic | 2/5 stars |
| Blender | 1/5 stars |
| Entertainment Weekly | B− |
| The Rolling Stone Album Guide | 3.5/5 stars |

== Track listing ==
| No. | Title | Writer(s) | Length |
|---|---|---|---|
| 1. | "Wanted Dead or Alive" | Jon Bon Jovi; Richie Sambora | 3:43 |
| 2. | "Livin' on a Prayer" (featuring Olivia d'Abo) | Bon Jovi; Sambora; Desmond Child | 3:41 |
| 3. | "Bad Medicine" | Bon Jovi; Sambora; Child | 4:27 |
| 4. | "It's My Life" | Bon Jovi; Sambora; Max Martin | 3:42 |
| 5. | "Lay Your Hands on Me" | Bon Jovi; Sambora | 4:27 |
| 6. | "You Give Love a Bad Name" | Bon Jovi; Sambora; Child | 3:29 |
| 7. | "Bed of Roses" | Bon Jovi | 5:38 |
| 8. | "Everyday" | Bon Jovi; Sambora; Andreas Carlsson | 3:45 |
| 9. | "Born to Be My Baby" | Bon Jovi; Sambora; Child | 5:27 |
| 10. | "Keep the Faith" | Bon Jovi; Sambora; Child | 4:12 |
| 11. | "I'll Be There for You" | Bon Jovi; Sambora | 4:21 |
| 12. | "Always" | Bon Jovi | 4:18 |

Limited edition bonus tracks
| No. | Title | Writer(s) | Length |
|---|---|---|---|
| 13. | "The Distance" (Live on January 19, 2003 in Yokohama, Japan) | Bon Jovi; Sambora; Child | 5:54 |

UK limited edition bonus tracks
| No. | Title | Writer(s) | Length |
|---|---|---|---|
| 13. | "The Distance" (Live on January 19, 2003 in Yokohama, Japan) | Bon Jovi; Sambora; Child | 5:54 |
| 14. | "Joey" (Live on January 19, 2003 in Yokohama, Japan) | Bon Jovi; Sambora | 5:33 |

Japan limited edition bonus tracks
| No. | Title | Writer(s) | Length |
|---|---|---|---|
| 13. | "The Distance" (Live on January 19, 2003 in Yokohama, Japan) | Bon Jovi; Sambora; Child | 5:54 |
| 14. | "Have a Little Faith in Me" (John Hiatt cover; Live) | John Hiatt | 4:07 |
| 15. | "Joey" (Live on January 19, 2003 in Yokohama, Japan) | Bon Jovi; Sambora | 5:33 |

Brazil limited edition bonus tracks
| No. | Title | Writer(s) | Length |
|---|---|---|---|
| 13. | "The Distance" (Live on January 19, 2003 in Yokohama, Japan) | Bon Jovi; Sambora; Child | 5:54 |
| 14. | "All About Lovin' You" | Bon Jovi; Sambora; Child; Carlsson | 3:27 |

== Bonus DVD ==
A bonus DVD came free with some editions of This Left Feels Right, recorded at NRG Studios, Burbank, CA, December 3, 2002, for sessions@AOL. All songs were recorded acoustic. The Japanese bonuses were recorded at Yokohama Arena, Yokohama, Japan, January 19, 2003. "In These Arms" & "Heroes" were recorded live and "Right Side of Wrong" is a montage of videos recorded backstage and before the show that night.

The track listing is as follows:

1. "Love for Sale"
2. "Someday I'll Be Saturday Night"
3. "Joey"
4. "Misunderstood"
5. "Diamond Ring"
6. "Blood on Blood (song)"
7. "In These Arms" (Japan Limited Edition Bonus DVD)
8. "Heroes" (David Bowie Cover) (Japan Limited Edition Bonus DVD)
9. "Right Side of Wrong" (Montage Video) (Japan Limited Edition Bonus DVD)

== Personnel ==
- Jon Bon Jovi – lead vocals, acoustic rhythm guitar
- Richie Sambora – acoustic lead guitar, background vocals, talkbox
- David Bryan – keyboards, piano, background vocals
- Tico Torres – drums, percussion

with

- Hugh McDonald – acoustic bass, background vocals
- Olivia d'Abo – vocals on "Livin' on a Prayer"

== Charts ==
=== Weekly charts ===
| Chart (2003) | Peak position |
|---|---|
| Australian Albums (ARIA) | 11 |
| Austrian Albums (Ö3 Austria) | 2 |
| Belgian Albums (Ultratop Flanders) | 7 |
| Belgian Albums (Ultratop Wallonia) | 46 |
| Dutch Albums (Album Top 100) | 6 |
| Finnish Albums (Suomen virallinen lista) | 18 |
| French Albums (SNEP) | 44 |
| German Albums (Offizielle Top 100) | 3 |
| Irish Albums (IRMA) | 8 |
| Italian Albums (FIMI) | 28 |
| Norwegian Albums (VG-lista) | 34 |
| Portuguese Albums (AFP) | 12 |
| Scottish Albums (Official Charts) | 4 |
| Singaporean Albums (RIAS) | 6 |
| Spanish Albums (AFYVE) | 13 |
| Swiss Albums (Schweizer Hitparade) | 3 |
| Swedish Albums (Sverigetopplistan) | 23 |
| UK Albums (Official Charts) | 4 |
| US Billboard 200 | 14 |

=== Year-end charts ===
| Chart (2003) | Position |
|---|---|
| Austrian Albums (Ö3 Austria) | 30 |
| Dutch Albums (Album Top 100) | 75 |
| Swiss Albums (Schweizer Hitparade) | 44 |
| UK Albums (OCC) | 77 |

| Chart (2004) | Position |
|---|---|
| Austrian Albums (Ö3 Austria) | 32 |
| Dutch Albums (Album Top 100) | 47 |

== Certifications ==
| Region | Certification | Certified units/sales |
|---|---|---|
| Austria (IFPI Austria) | Gold | 15,000^{*} |
| Canada (Music Canada) | Gold | 50,000^{^} |
| Denmark (IFPI Danmark) | Gold | 10,000^{‡} |
| Germany (BVMI) | Platinum | 200,000^{‡} |
| Japan (RIAJ) | Gold | 100,000^{^} |
| Spain (Promusicae) | Gold | 50,000^{^} |
| Switzerland (IFPI Switzerland) | Gold | 20,000^{^} |
| United Kingdom (BPI) | Platinum | 300,000^{^} |
| United States (RIAA) | Gold | 500,000^{‡} |
^{*} Sales figures based on certification alone.^{^} Shipments figures based on certification alone.^{‡} Sales+streaming figures based on certification alone.
