= This Left Feels Right Live =

Video by Bon Jovi
- Released: February 9, 2004
- Recorded: November 14 and 15, 2003
- Venue: Borgata (Atlantic City, New Jersey)
- Genres: Rock, acoustic
- Length: 108 minutes
- Label: Mercury Records
- Director: Tony Bongiovi

Bon Jovi chronology
The Crush Tour	This Left Feels Right Live	Lost Highway: The Concert

This Left Feels Right Live is the third of Bon Jovi's live concert videos. Filmed at Atlantic City, New Jersey, this features the band's performance at the Borgata on November 14 and 15, 2003. The DVD was directed by Tony Bongiovi (Anthony Michael Bongiovi) - Jon's younger brother, not his cousin of the same name.

== Track listing ==
1. Love for Sale
2. You Give Love a Bad Name*
3. Wanted Dead or Alive*
4. Livin' on a Prayer*
5. It's My Life*
6. Misunderstood
7. Lay Your Hands on Me*
8. Someday I'll Be Saturday Night
9. Last Man Standing
10. Sylvia's Mother
11. Everyday*
12. Bad Medicine*
13. Bed of Roses*
14. Born to Be My Baby*
15. Keep the Faith*
16. Joey
17. Thief of Hearts
18. I'll Be There for You*
19. Always*
20. Blood on Blood (song)

[*]: New reconstructed version from This Left Feels Right.

== Additional material ==
The DVD includes a 30-minute documentary entitled "Everyday with Bon Jovi", which shows behind the scenes footage from the Atlantic City concert. The DVD also contains outtakes including a montage music video of the song "The Right Side of Wrong" and production credits.

=== Limited Edition Bonus Disc ===
The Bonus DVD contains an interactive Poker game with the band, a multi camera angle "Directors view" of three songs from the Atlantic City concert, an exclusive interview with the band, six songs from Bon Jovi's June 28, 2003 concert in Hyde Park, London, and a photo gallery.

Directors View

1. Love for Sale
2. I'll Be There for You
3. Lay Your Hands on Me

Hyde Park

1. Lay Your Hands on Me
2. Raise Your Hands
3. Captain Crash & The Beauty Queen From Mars
4. Blood on Blood
5. Bounce
6. Everyday

== Personnel ==
Bon Jovi

- Jon Bon Jovi – lead vocals, acoustic rhythm guitar
- Richie Sambora – acoustic lead guitar, backing vocals
- David Bryan – keyboards, backing vocals
- Tico Torres – drums, percussion

Additional musicians

- Hugh McDonald – acoustic bass guitar, backing vocals
- Bobby Bandiera – acoustic rhythm guitar, backing vocals
- Jeff Kazee – keyboards, backing vocals
- Everett Bradley – percussion, backing vocals

== Charts ==
Chart (2004)	Peak position
Australian Music DVDs Chart	3
Austrian Music DVDs Chart	1
Belgian (Flanders) Music DVDs Chart	9
Dutch Music DVDs Chart	6
German Albums Chart	28
Spanish Music DVDs Chart	1
Swedish Music DVDs Chart	3
US Music Videos Chart	4

== Certifications ==
Region	Certification	Certified units/sales
Brazil (Pro-Música Brasil)	Gold	25,000^{*}
^{*} Sales figures based on certification alone.
