= One Wild Night Tour =

2001 concert tour by Bon Jovi

- Tour by Bon Jovi
- Poster to the concert in Cologne, Germany
- Start date: March 24, 2001
- End date: July 28, 2001
- Legs: 4
- No. of shows: 31 in North America; 17 in Europe; 5 in Asia; 1 in Oceania; 54 in total

Bon Jovi concert chronology
- Crush Tour (1999–2001); One Wild Night Tour (2001); Bounce Tour (2002–2003)

One Wild Night Tour was a worldwide tour in support of Bon Jovi's seventh studio album Crush (2000).

== Background ==
The tour was originally planned to kick off in Japan, but instead, the band decided to headline the charity concert on Melbourne's Colonial Stadium on March 24, 2001, to raise funds for flood-stricken farmers. There were 34,000 attenders and the concert grossed $850,000. Because of the falling Australian dollar, production costs soared close $500,000 and it involved transporting 70 tons of Bon Jovi's equipment in a jumbo jet from the United States. Paul Krige, managing director of Universal Music Australia, said that A$300,000 were made from ticket sales alone. Approximately $50,000 were raised from telethon that was hold nationally on April 15, 2001 by Seven Network, which screened the concert on that day. Proceeds went to State Emergency Services and Volunteer Bushfire Service. Six tracks from Bon Jovi's set were included on Australian only bonus CD of the Bon Jovi's debut live album One Wild Night Live 1985-2001 (2001).

The Japanese leg of the tour kicked off in Yokohama with two concerts in Yokohama Arena on March 28 and 29. The Japanese leg of the tour lasted until April 5. Following five shows in Japan, the band embarked on the first North American leg of the tour on April 18, playing concerts in arenas and amphitheaters. Through May 2001, the band headed to Europe for a month of concerts before returning to United States for a series of concerts that culminated on July 27 show at Giants Stadium in New Jersey.

== Personnel ==
Bon Jovi

- Jon Bon Jovi – lead vocals, rhythm guitar, maracas for Keep the Faith, tambourine for Hey God
- Richie Sambora – lead guitar, talk box, backing vocals
- David Bryan – keyboards, backing vocals
- Tico Torres – drums, percussion

Additional musicians

- Hugh McDonald – bass, backing vocals
- Alec John Such – bass (Guest at two shows)

== Tour dates ==
Date	City	Country	Venue
Oceania
March 24, 2001	Melbourne	Australia	Etihad Stadium
Asia
March 28, 2001	Yokohama	Japan	Yokohama Arena
March 29, 2001	Yokohama	Japan	Yokohama Arena
March 31, 2001	Osaka	Japan	Osaka Dome
April 3, 2001	Nagoya	Japan	Nagoya Dome
April 5, 2001	Tokyo	Japan	Tokyo Dome
North America
April 18, 2001	Phoenix	United States	Desert Sky Pavilion
April 20, 2001	Anaheim	United States	Arrowhead Pond
April 21, 2001	Las Vegas	United States	MGM Grand Garden Arena
April 23, 2001	San Jose	United States	San Jose Arena
April 25, 2001	Mexico City	Mexico	Foro Sol
April 28, 2001	Salt Lake City	United States	Delta Center
April 30, 2001	Denver	United States	Pepsi Center
May 2, 2001	Dallas	United States	Smirnoff Music Centre
May 4, 2001	Columbus	United States	Value City Arena
May 5, 2001	Cleveland	United States	Gund Arena
May 8, 2001	Grand Rapids	United States	Van Andel Arena
May 10, 2001	Raleigh	United States	Walnut Creek Amphitheatre
May 11, 2001	Atlanta	United States	Philips Arena
May 13, 2001	Washington, D.C.	United States	MCI Center
May 15, 2001	Greenville	United States	BI-LO Center
May 17, 2001	Ottawa	Canada	Corel Centre
May 19, 2001	Quebec City	Canada	Colisée Pepsi
May 20, 2001	Albany	United States	Pepsi Arena
Europe
May 31, 2001	Stockholm	Sweden	Stockholms Stadion
June 3, 2001	Werchter	Belgium	Werchter festival ground
June 5, 2001	Amsterdam	Netherlands	Amsterdam Arena
June 6, 2001	Amsterdam	Netherlands	Amsterdam Arena
June 8, 2001	Glasgow	Scotland	Hampden Park
June 10, 2001	Dublin	Ireland	RDS Arena
June 13, 2001	Huddersfield	England	Galpharm Stadium
June 16, 2001	Milton Keynes	England	National Bowl
June 17, 2001	Cardiff	Wales	Millennium Stadium
June 19, 2001	Paris	France	Palais Omnisports de Paris-Bercy
June 20, 2001	Cologne	Germany	Müngersdorfer Stadion
June 22, 2001	Stuttgart	Germany	Cannstatter Wasen
June 24, 2001	Hamburg	Germany	Trabrennbahn Bahrenfeld
June 26, 2001	Zürich	Switzerland	Letzigrund
June 27, 2001	Padua	Italy	Stadio Euganeo
June 29, 2001	Vienna	Austria	Praterstadion
June 30, 2001	Munich	Germany	Olympiastadion
North America
July 8, 2001	Milwaukee	United States	Marcus Amphitheater
July 9, 2001	Minneapolis	United States	Target Center
July 13, 2001	Tinley Park	United States	New World Music Theatre
July 15, 2001	Clarkston	United States	DTE Energy Music Theatre
July 16, 2001	Clarkston	United States	DTE Energy Music Theatre
July 17, 2001	Toronto	Canada	Molson Amphitheatre
July 19, 2001	Montreal	Canada	Molson Centre
July 21, 2001	Burgettstown	United States	Post-Gazette Pavilion
July 22, 2001	Hershey	United States	Hersheypark Stadium
July 24, 2001	Camden	United States	Tweeter Center at the Waterfront
July 25, 2001	Mansfield	United States	Tweeter Center
July 27, 2001	East Rutherford	United States	Giants Stadium
July 28, 2001	East Rutherford	United States	Giants Stadium

=== Box office score data ===
Venue	City	Tickets sold / available	Gross revenue
Van Andel Arena	Grand Rapids	11,805 / 12,397 (95%)	$500,503
BI-LO Center	Greenville	11,541 / 11,541 (100%)	$425,245
Target Center	Minneapolis	13,834 / 13,834 (100%)	$677,320
Hersheypark Stadium	Hershey	22,540 / 29,100 (77%)	$977,315
Giants Stadium	East Rutherford	107,248 / 107,248 (100%)	$6,317,039
TOTAL (for the concerts listed)		166,968 / 174,120 (96%)	$8,897,422

From the 19 shows reported from Billboard, the One Wild Night Tour grossed a total of $17,143,241 with a total attendance of 391,321.

== Setlist ==
The songs "It's My Life", "One Wild Night", "Just Older", "You Give Love a Bad Name", "Bad Medicine" and "I'll Sleep When I'm Dead" were played at every concert of the tour. "Livin' on a Prayer", "Wanted Dead or Alive" and "Born to Be My Baby" were left out only once. In general most songs played were from the album Crush. Like usual for Bon Jovi, the setlist changed from show to show. This is the setlist from the show at Corel Centre, Ottawa, Canada from May 17, 2001:

1. "One Wild Night"
2. "You Give Love a Bad Name"
3. "It's My Life"
4. "Keep the Faith" (with snippets of "Sympathy for the Devil")
5. "Livin' on a Prayer"
6. "Born to Be My Baby"
7. "Always"
8. "Bed of Roses"
9. "Someday I'll Be Saturday Night"
10. "I Got The Girl"
11. "Just Older"
12. "Blaze of Glory"
13. "I'll Be There for You"
14. "Lay Your Hands on Me"
15. "I'll Sleep When I'm Dead"
16. "Bad Medicine" (with snippets of "Shout")

Encore 1:

16. "In These Arms"
17. "Say It Isn't So"
18. "Wanted Dead or Alive"

Encore 2:

19. "Tequila"
20. "Twist and Shout"
