= New Jersey Syndicate Tour =

1988–90 concert tour by Bon Jovi

Jersey Syndicate Tour
- Tour by Bon Jovi
- Cover of tour programme
- Associated album: New Jersey
- Start date: October 31, 1988
- End date: February 17, 1990
- Legs: 8
- No. of shows: 61 in Europe; 7 in Asia; 151 in North America; 10 in Australasia; 9 in South America; 238 total

Bon Jovi concert chronology
- Slippery When Wet Tour (1986–87); New Jersey Syndicate Tour (1988–90); Keep the Faith Tour (1993)

The Jersey Syndicate Tour (also known as The Brotherhood on Tour and New Jersey: The Tour) was the fourth concert tour by American band Bon Jovi, that ran from 1988 to 1990. The massive, highly successful world tour was put on in support of the band's fourth studio album New Jersey (1988).

== Background ==
Bon Jovi made history in becoming one of the first North American bands to play Russia, with two performances there at the Moscow Music Peace Festival on August 12–13, 1989.

The tour was very grueling and exhausting and led to the band's hiatus at the tour's conclusion. Bon Jovi had toured heavily since 1984 and the tour put pressures on the band's relationships with each other and their families, on their health, and their emotions. The tour was often noted for its extended musical performances of songs, which would often run twice the length of the album track as well as raw emotional vocal performances by Jon Bon Jovi. Jon had to enlist the help of a vocal coach to help sustain his voice and lead guitarist Richie Sambora would often help out more on the high notes. The band would also perform some of their songs in acoustic format, signaling a change in musical style and maturation of the band.

The concert performances on the tour featured vivid pyrotechnics, a catwalk elevated above the crowd, and an elevator in the middle of the stage that allowed Jon to seemingly materialize out of nowhere during a pyro blast. Prior to the band taking the stage Emerson Lake & Palmer's Karn Evil 9 First Impression Part Two was played at full volume over the PA. The concerts also required extensive security due to the band's iconic status as major rock stars of the time.

In addition, Bon Jovi shot the music videos for "Lay Your Hands on Me", "I'll Be There for You", and "Blood on Blood" during performances on the tour, and recorded footage for their video releases Access All Areas and New Jersey: The Videos on this tour.

This was the last tour by the band to feature a notable amount of material from their first two albums. After the band hit it big with the album Slippery When Wet, they began to phase their pre-stardom material out of their live sets because according to interviews it did not match the standards set by the material on their later releases. Even on this tour only "Runaway" and "Get Ready" from Bon Jovi and "Tokyo Road" from 7800° Fahrenheit were performed except for one performance of "Silent Night" at the Hammersmith Odeon in 1990.

With the exception of "Runaway", which is still played regularly to this day, virtually nothing from those albums has been performed since the tour's conclusion (though a notable exception is on "The Circle Tour" in 2010 in which Get Ready, Shot Through the Heart, Tokyo Road, Roulette and Only Lonely were played).

== Opening acts ==
- Lita Ford (Europe, Leg 1, select dates)
- Dan Reed Network (Europe, Leg 7, select dates)
- Skid Row (North America, select dates)
- Roxus (Australia)
- Scorpions (Munich - December 1988)
- Cinderella (Munich - December 1988, Akron - July 1989)
- Billy Squier (East Rutherford - June 1989)
- Sam Kinison (East Rutherford - June 1989)
- Bad Company (Saratoga Springs - June 1989)
- BulletBoys (Thornville, Akron - both July 1989)
- Winger (Akron - July 1989)
- Icon (Phoenix - September 1989)
- Johnny Diesel and the Injectors (Auckland - November 1989)
- Noiseworks (Auckland - November 1989)
- Knights Blade (Auckland - November 1989)

== Setlist ==
The following setlist was obtained from the concert held on March 15, 1989, at the Brendan Byrne Arena in East Rutherford, New Jersey. It does not represent all concerts for the duration of the tour.

1. "Lay Your Hands on Me"
2. "I'd Die for You"
3. "Wild in the Streets"
4. "You Give Love a Bad Name"
5. "Tokyo Road"
6. "Born to Be My Baby"
7. "Let It Rock"
8. "I'll Be There for You"
9. "Blood on Blood"
10. "Runaway"
11. "Livin' on a Prayer"
12. "Living in Sin"
13. "Travelin' Band"
14. "Ride Cowboy Ride"
15. "Wanted Dead or Alive"
16. "Bad Medicine"
17. "Shout"
18. "Never Say Goodbye"

== Tour dates ==
List of concerts, showing date, city, country, venue, tickets sold, number of available tickets and amount of gross revenue
Date	City	Country	Venue	Attendance	Revenue
Europe					
October 31, 1988	Dublin	Ireland	RDS Simmonscourt	—N/a	—N/a
November 1, 1988	Dublin	Ireland	RDS Simmonscourt	—N/a	—N/a
November 4, 1988	Stuttgart	West Germany	Hanns-Martin-Schleyer-Halle	—N/a	—N/a
November 6, 1988	Frankfurt	West Germany	Festhalle Frankfurt	—N/a	—N/a
November 7, 1988	Saarbrücken	West Germany	Saarlandhalle	—N/a	—N/a
November 10, 1988	Zürich	Switzerland	Hallenstadion	—N/a	—N/a
November 11, 1988	Zürich	Switzerland	Hallenstadion	—N/a	—N/a
November 13, 1988	Florence	Italy	Palasport	—N/a	—N/a
November 14, 1988	Rome	Italy	Palazzo dello Sport	—N/a	—N/a
November 16, 1988	Milan	Italy	Palatrussardi	—N/a	—N/a
November 17, 1988	Milan	Italy	Palatrussardi	—N/a	—N/a
November 20, 1988	Paris	France	Zénith de Paris	—N/a	—N/a
November 21, 1988	Rotterdam	Netherlands	Sportpaleis von Ahoy	—N/a	—N/a
November 24, 1988	Drammen	Norway	Drammenshallen	—N/a	—N/a
November 25, 1988	Gothenburg	Sweden	Scandinavium	—N/a	—N/a
November 26, 1988	Stockholm	Sweden	Johanneshovs Isstadion	—N/a	—N/a
November 28, 1988	Helsinki	Finland	Helsingin Jäähalli	—N/a	—N/a
December 2, 1988	Glasgow	Scotland	SECC Concert Hall 4	—N/a	—N/a
December 3, 1988	Glasgow	Scotland	SECC Concert Hall 4	—N/a	—N/a
December 5, 1988	Birmingham	England	NEC Arena	—N/a	—N/a
December 6, 1988	Birmingham	England	NEC Arena	—N/a	—N/a
December 8, 1988	London	England	Wembley Arena	—N/a	—N/a
December 9, 1988	London	England	Wembley Arena	—N/a	—N/a
December 11, 1988	Birmingham	England	NEC Arena	—N/a	—N/a
December 12, 1988	London	England	Wembley Arena	—N/a	—N/a
December 13, 1988	London	England	Wembley Arena	—N/a	—N/a
December 15, 1988	Brussels	Belgium	Forest National	—N/a	—N/a
December 16, 1988	Dortmund	West Germany	Westfalenhallen	—N/a	—N/a
December 17, 1988	Hamburg	West Germany	Alsterdorfer Sporthalle	—N/a	—N/a
December 19, 1988	Munich	West Germany	Olympiahalle	—N/a	—N/a
Asia
December 31, 1988^{[A]}	Tokyo	Japan	Tokyo Dome	—N/a	—N/a
January 1, 1989^{[A]}	Tokyo	Japan	Tokyo Dome	—N/a	—N/a
January 5, 1989	Osaka	Japan	Osaka-Jo Hall	—N/a	—N/a
January 6, 1989	Osaka	Japan	Osaka-Jo Hall	—N/a	—N/a
January 7, 1989	Osaka	Japan	Osaka-Jo Hall	—N/a	—N/a
January 9, 1989	Nagoya	Japan	Nagoya Rainbow Hall	—N/a	—N/a
January 10, 1989	Nagoya	Japan	Nagoya Rainbow Hall	—N/a	—N/a
North America
January 13, 1989	Honolulu	United States	Blaisdell Arena	—N/a	—N/a
January 14, 1989	Honolulu	United States	Blaisdell Arena	—N/a	—N/a
January 15, 1989	Honolulu	United States	Blaisdell Arena	—N/a	—N/a
January 26, 1989	Dallas	United States	Reunion Arena	16,761 / 19,000	$311,351
January 27, 1989	San Antonio	United States	San Antonio Convention Center	13,659 / 13,659	$195,930
January 29, 1989	Houston	United States	The Summit	16,223 / 16,509	$278,285
January 30, 1989	Austin	United States	Frank Erwin Center	15,277 / 15,277	$217,309
February 1, 1989	Biloxi	United States	Mississippi Coast Coliseum	13,100 / 13,100	$224,613
February 2, 1989	Baton Rouge	United States	LSU Assembly Center	11,772 / 11,772	$199,877
February 4, 1989	Pensacola	United States	Pensacola Civic Center	12,010 / 12,010	$209,178
February 5, 1989	Tallahassee	United States	Tallahassee-Leon County Civic Center	11,420 / 11,420	$196,123
February 7, 1989	Jacksonville	United States	Jacksonville Veterans Memorial Coliseum	11,676 / 11,676	$200,288
February 9, 1989	Miami	United States	Miami Arena	15,741 / 15,741	$291,209
February 10, 1989	Orlando	United States	Orlando Arena	14,749 / 14,749	$258,108
February 11, 1989	San Juan	Puerto Rico	Estadio Hiram Bithorn	—N/a	—N/a
February 14, 1989	Birmingham	United States	BJCC Coliseum	15,500 / 15,500	$267,545
February 15, 1989	Atlanta	United States	Omni Coliseum	15,816 / 15,816	$292,596
February 17, 1989	Charlotte	United States	Charlotte Coliseum	—N/a	—N/a
February 19, 1989	Chapel Hill	United States	Dean Smith Center	19,376 / 19,376	$329,360
February 20, 1989	Murfreesboro	United States	Murphy Athletic Center	11,314 / 11,314	$192,338
February 22, 1989	Memphis	United States	Mid-South Coliseum	11,122 / 11,122	$190,740
February 23, 1989	Knoxville	United States	Thompson–Boling Arena	13,600 / 14,672	$238,000
February 26, 1989	Lexington	United States	Rupp Arena	14,635 / 18,000	$270,748
February 28, 1989	Hampton	United States	Hampton Coliseum	—N/a	—N/a
March 2, 1989	Providence	United States	Providence Civic Center	14,029 / 14,029	$259,537
March 3, 1989	Syracuse	United States	Carrier Dome	—N/a	—N/a
March 6, 1989	Hartford	United States	Hartford Civic Center	—N/a	—N/a
March 7, 1989	Landover	United States	Capital Centre	—N/a	—N/a
March 8, 1989	Philadelphia	United States	Spectrum	18,263 / 18,263	$308,805
March 10, 1989	Uniondale	United States	Nassau Veterans Memorial Coliseum	17,165 / 17,165	$341,728
March 12, 1989	Worcester	United States	The Centrum in Worcester	25,003 / 25,003	$462,556
March 13, 1989	Worcester	United States	The Centrum in Worcester	25,003 / 25,003	$462,556
March 15, 1989	East Rutherford	United States	Brendan Byrne Arena	—N/a	—N/a
March 21, 1989	Detroit	United States	Joe Louis Arena	19,812 / 19,812	$396,240
March 22, 1989	Evansville	United States	Roberts Municipal Stadium	10,353 / 10,353	$182,423
March 24, 1989	Rosemont	United States	Rosemont Horizon	17,122 / 17,122	$342,440
March 25, 1989	Richfield Township	United States	The Coliseum at Richfield	18,160 / 18,160	$326,880
March 26, 1989	Indianapolis	United States	Market Square Arena	16,632 / 16,632	$291,060
March 28, 1989	Iowa City	United States	Carver–Hawkeye Arena	11,570 / 11,570	$200,596
March 29, 1989	Champaign	United States	Assembly Hall	—N/a	—N/a
April 1, 1989	Milwaukee	United States	Bradley Center	17,994 / 17,994	$334,685
April 2, 1989	Ames	United States	Hilton Coliseum	11,957 / 11,957	$203,269
April 4, 1989	Bloomington	United States	Metropolitan Sports Center	16,071 / 16,071	$296,574
April 5, 1989	Omaha	United States	Omaha Civic Auditorium	12,000 / 12,000	$201,076
April 7, 1989	St. Louis	United States	St. Louis Arena	16,776 / 16,776	$293,832
April 8, 1989	Carbondale	United States	SIU Arena	9,780 / 9,780	$166,260
April 10, 1989	Park City	United States	Britt Brown Arena	12,000 / 12,000	$210,000
April 11, 1989	Oklahoma City	United States	Myriad Convention Center	14,348 / 14,348	$245,490
April 13, 1989	Kansas City	United States	Kemper Arena	—N/a	—N/a
April 15, 1989	Lubbock	United States	Lubbock Municipal Coliseum	10,600 / 10,600	$169,406
April 16, 1989	Las Cruces	United States	Pan American Center	10,963 / 12,547	$186,025
April 18, 1989	Albuquerque	United States	Tingley Coliseum	10,656 / 10,656	$184,345
April 20, 1989	Chandler	United States	Compton Terrace	16,000 / 16,000	$257,153
April 21, 1989	San Diego	United States	San Diego Sports Arena	12,603 / 13,781	$210,735
April 22, 1989	Irvine	United States	Irvine Meadows Amphitheatre	15,000 / 15,000	$306,880
April 24, 1989	Las Vegas	United States	Thomas & Mack Center	10,145 / 10,145	$177,537
April 25, 1989	Inglewood	United States	Great Western Forum	31,580 / 31,580	$528,101
April 26, 1989	Inglewood	United States	Great Western Forum	31,580 / 31,580	$528,101
April 29, 1989	Mountain View	United States	Shoreline Amphitheatre	35,284 / 37,878	$648,770
April 30, 1989	Mountain View	United States	Shoreline Amphitheatre	35,284 / 37,878	$648,770
May 2, 1989	Salt Lake City	United States	Salt Palace	—N/a	—N/a
May 3, 1989	Salt Lake City	United States	Salt Palace	—N/a	—N/a
May 5, 1989	Boise	United States	BSU Pavilion	9,566 / 12,428	$132,876
May 7, 1989	Pullman	United States	Beasley Coliseum	9,493 / 12,520	$170,663
May 8, 1989	Portland	United States	Memorial Coliseum	21,492 / 21,492	$354,849
May 9, 1989	Portland	United States	Memorial Coliseum	21,492 / 21,492	$354,849
May 10, 1989	Tacoma	United States	Tacoma Dome	23,141 / 28,855	$430,920
May 11, 1989	Vancouver	Canada	BC Place	—N/a	—N/a
May 13, 1989	Anchorage	United States	Sullivan Arena	—N/a	—N/a
May 14, 1989	Anchorage	United States	Sullivan Arena	—N/a	—N/a
May 15, 1989	Anchorage	United States	Sullivan Arena	—N/a	—N/a
May 27, 1989	Mears	United States	Val Du Lakes Amphitheatre	—N/a	—N/a
May 28, 1989	Detroit	United States	Joe Louis Arena	17,877 / 19,868	$357,540
May 29, 1989	Peoria	United States	Peoria Civic Center	8,305 / 8,305	$153,643
May 31, 1989	Charleston	United States	Charleston Civic Center	10,899 / 11,000	$190,733
June 2, 1989	Toronto	Canada	CNE Grandstand	21,312 / 21,312	$431,883
June 3, 1989	Montreal	Canada	Montreal Forum	15,207 / 15,207	$272,459
June 4, 1989	Quebec City	Canada	Colisée de Québec	13,873 / 14,320	$248,558
June 7, 1989	Providence	United States	Providence Civic Center	13,816 / 13,816	$255,596
June 8, 1989	Plains Township	United States	Pocono Downs	—N/a	—N/a
June 9, 1989	Hershey	United States	Hersheypark Stadium	20,041 / 20,041	$370,760
June 11, 1989	East Rutherford	United States	Giants Stadium	72,641 / 72,641	$1,474,788
June 13, 1989	Pittsburgh	United States	Civic Arena	30,828 / 30,828	$592,209
June 14, 1989	Pittsburgh	United States	Civic Arena	30,828 / 30,828	$592,209
June 16, 1989	Johnstown	United States	Point Stadium	12,653 / 14,000	$225,506
June 19, 1989	Philadelphia	United States	Spectrum	29,083 / 29,083	$516,557
June 20, 1989	Philadelphia	United States	Spectrum	29,083 / 29,083	$516,557
June 22, 1989	Old Orchard Beach	United States	Seashore Performing Arts Center	—N/a	—N/a
June 23, 1989	Hartford	United States	Hartford Civic Center	30,101 / 30,101	$544,515
June 24, 1989	Hartford	United States	Hartford Civic Center	30,101 / 30,101	$544,515
June 25, 1989	Saratoga Springs	United States	Saratoga Speedway	—N/a	—N/a
June 28, 1989	Mansfield	United States	Great Woods Center for the Performing Arts	—N/a	—N/a
June 29, 1989	Mansfield	United States	Great Woods Center for the Performing Arts	—N/a	—N/a
June 30, 1989	Mansfield	United States	Great Woods Center for the Performing Arts	—N/a	—N/a
July 2, 1989	Thornville	United States	Buckeye Lake Music Center	—N/a	—N/a
July 3, 1989	Akron	United States	Rubber Bowl	—N/a	—N/a
July 5, 1989	Rochester	United States	Silver Stadium	16,367 / 30,000	$319,156
July 6, 1989	Niagara Falls	United States	Niagara Falls Civic Center	—N/a	—N/a
July 8, 1989	Manchester	United States	Riverfront Park	—N/a	—N/a
July 9, 1989	Middletown	United States	Orange County Fair Speedway	—N/a	—N/a
July 11, 1989	Landover	United States	Capital Centre	14,808 / 15,000	$273,948
July 12, 1989	Richmond	United States	Richmond Coliseum	10,352 / 12,500	$170,808
July 14, 1989	Chattanooga	United States	UTC Arena	11,852 / 11,852	$202,440
July 15, 1989	Greensboro	United States	Greensboro Coliseum	12,123 / 12,123	$224,276
July 16, 1989	Columbia	United States	Carolina Coliseum	11,983 / 11,983	$210,345
July 18, 1989	Noblesville	United States	Deer Creek Music Center	—N/a	—N/a
July 19, 1989	Nashville	United States	Starwood Amphitheatre	—N/a	—N/a
July 20, 1989	Atlanta	United States	Lakewood Amphitheatre	—N/a	—N/a
July 22, 1989	Lafayette	United States	Cajundome	10,200 / 10,200	$182,503
July 23, 1989	New Orleans	United States	UNO Lakefront Arena	10,601 / 10,601	$193,362
July 24, 1989	Monroe	United States	Monroe Civic Center	—N/a	—N/a
July 25, 1989	Dallas	United States	Coca-Cola Starplex Amphitheatre	14,887 / 20,000	$268,022
July 28, 1989	Greenwood Village	United States	Fiddler's Green Amphitheatre	—N/a	—N/a
July 29, 1989	Greenwood Village	United States	Fiddler's Green Amphitheatre	—N/a	—N/a
July 30, 1989	Topeka	United States	Landon Arena	9,864 / 9,864	$162,755
July 31, 1989	Omaha	United States	Omaha Civic Auditorium	12,000 / 12,000	$206,376
August 1, 1989	Bloomington	United States	Metropolitan Sports Center	17,325 / 17,325	$301,643
August 2, 1989	Cedar Rapids	United States	Five Seasons Center	10,000 / 10,000	$170,110
August 4, 1989	East Troy	Alpine Valley Music Theatre	30,353 / 40,000	$579,956	
Europe
August 12, 1989^{[B]}	Moscow	Soviet Union	Central Lenin Stadium	—N/a	—N/a
August 13, 1989^{[B]}	Moscow	Soviet Union	Central Lenin Stadium	—N/a	—N/a
August 19, 1989^{[C]}	Milton Keynes	England	Milton Keynes Bowl	—N/a	—N/a
North America
August 23, 1989	Charlevoix	United States	Castle Farms Music Theatre	—N/a	—N/a
August 25, 1989	Winnipeg	Canada	Winnipeg Arena	—N/a	—N/a
August 26, 1989	Regina	Canada	Regina Agridome	—N/a	—N/a
August 28, 1989	Calgary	Canada	Olympic Saddledome	14,445 / 15,000	$288,560
August 29, 1989	Edmonton	Canada	Northlands Coliseum	—N/a	—N/a
August 30, 1989	Saskatoon	Canada	Saskatchewan Place	10,454 / 10,454	$218,498
September 1, 1989	Casper	United States	Casper Events Center	—N/a	—N/a
September 2, 1989	Rapid City	United States	Rushmore Plaza Civic Center	11,000 / 11,000	$199,930
September 3, 1989	Sioux Falls	United States	Sioux Falls Arena	—N/a	—N/a
September 7, 1989	Irvine	United States	Irvine Meadows Amphitheatre	30,000 / 30,000	$632,773
September 8, 1989	Sacramento	United States	Cal Expo Amphitheatre	28,000 / 28,000	$551,485
September 9, 1989	Sacramento	United States	Cal Expo Amphitheatre	28,000 / 28,000	$551,485
September 10, 1989	Irvine	United States	Irvine Meadows Amphitheatre	—N/a	—N/a
September 12, 1989	Phoenix	United States	Arizona Veterans Memorial Coliseum	14,000 / 14,000	$251,636
September 14, 1989	Tulsa	United States	Tulsa Convention Center	—N/a	—N/a
September 15, 1989	Shreveport	United States	Hirsch Memorial Coliseum	—N/a	—N/a
September 16, 1989	Little Rock	United States	Barton Coliseum	—N/a	—N/a
September 17, 1989	Jackson	United States	Mississippi Coliseum	—N/a	—N/a
September 19, 1989	Huntsville	United States	Von Braun Civic Center	—N/a	—N/a
September 20, 1989	Augusta	United States	Augusta-Richmond County Civic Center	9,000 / 9,000	$161,857
September 21, 1989	Albany	United States	Albany Civic Center	11,347 / 12,300	$207,290
September 23, 1989	Miami	United States	Miami Arena	15,649 / 15,649	$277,680
September 24, 1989	Lakeland	United States	Jenkins Arena	19,516 / 19,516	$351,288
September 25, 1989	Lakeland	United States	Jenkins Arena	19,516 / 19,516	$351,288
September 27, 1989	Mobile	United States	Mobile Civic Center	15,000 / 15,000	$262,500
September 28, 1989	Lake Charles	United States	Lake Charles Civic Center	—N/a	—N/a
September 29, 1989	Houston	United States	The Summit	14,966 / 16,000	$263,336
September 30, 1989	Abilene	United States	Taylor County Coliseum	—N/a	—N/a
October 1, 1989	Bonner Springs	United States	Sandstone Center for the Performing Arts	—N/a	—N/a
October 2, 1989	Columbia	United States	Hearnes Center	8,209 / 8,209	$134,345
October 3, 1989	Louisville	United States	Freedom Hall	14,712 / 14,712	$257,460
October 4, 1989	Cincinnati	United States	Riverfront Coliseum	15,372 / 15,372	$275,946
Oceania
October 31, 1989	Brisbane	Australia	Brisbane Entertainment Centre	—N/a	—N/a
November 1, 1989	Brisbane	Australia	Brisbane Entertainment Centre	—N/a	—N/a
November 2, 1989	Sydney	Australia	Sydney Entertainment Centre	—N/a	—N/a
November 3, 1989	Sydney	Australia	Sydney Entertainment Centre	—N/a	—N/a
November 4, 1989	Sydney	Australia	Sydney Entertainment Centre	—N/a	—N/a
November 8, 1989	Perth	Australia	Perth Entertainment Centre	—N/a	—N/a
November 11, 1989	Adelaide	Australia	Memorial Drive Park	—N/a	—N/a
November 13, 1989	Melbourne	Australia	Melbourne Sports and Entertainment Centre	—N/a	—N/a
November 14, 1989	Melbourne	Australia	Melbourne Sports and Entertainment Centre	—N/a	—N/a
November 18, 1989	Auckland	New Zealand	Western Springs Stadium	—N/a	—N/a
Europe
November 29, 1989	Cascais	Portugal	Pavilhão Dramático de Cascais	—N/a	—N/a
December 1, 1989	Madrid	Spain	Palacio de Deportes de la Comunidad de Madrid	—N/a	—N/a
December 2, 1989	Barcelona	Spain	Palau dels Esports de Barcelona	—N/a	—N/a
December 3, 1989	San Sebastián	Spain	Velódromo de Anoeta	—N/a	—N/a
December 5, 1989	Paris	France	Le Grande Nef	—N/a	—N/a
December 6, 1989	Rotterdam	Netherlands	Sportpaleis von Ahoy	—N/a	—N/a
December 7, 1989	Cologne	West Germany	Kölner Sporthalle	—N/a	—N/a
December 9, 1989	Oldenburg	West Germany	Weser-Ems Halle	—N/a	—N/a
December 10, 1989	Hamburg	West Germany	Alsterdorfer Sporthalle	—N/a	—N/a
December 11, 1989	Copenhagen	Denmark	Valby-Hallen	—N/a	—N/a
December 13, 1989	Helsinki	Finland	Helsingin Jäähalli	—N/a	—N/a
December 15, 1989	Stockholm	Sweden	Stockholm Globe Arena	—N/a	—N/a
December 16, 1989	Gothenburg	Sweden	Scandinavium	—N/a	—N/a
December 18, 1989	Drammen	Norway	Drammenshallen	—N/a	—N/a
December 21, 1989	Munich	West Germany	Olympiahalle	—N/a	—N/a
December 22, 1989	Zurich	Switzerland	Hallenstadion	—N/a	—N/a
December 23, 1989^{[D]}	Frankfurt	West Germany	Festhalle Frankfurt	—N/a	—N/a
December 27, 1989	Birmingham	England	NEC Areana	—N/a	—N/a
December 28, 1989	Birmingham	England	NEC Areana	—N/a	—N/a
December 29, 1989	Birmingham	England	NEC Areana	—N/a	—N/a
December 30, 1989	Birmingham	England	NEC Areana	—N/a	—N/a
January 2, 1990	London	England	Wembley Arena	—N/a	—N/a
January 3, 1990	London	England	Wembley Arena	—N/a	—N/a
January 4, 1990	London	England	Wembley Arena	—N/a	—N/a
January 6, 1990	Belfast	Northern Ireland	King's Hall	—N/a	—N/a
January 8, 1990	Dublin	Ireland	Point Theatre	—N/a	—N/a
January 9, 1990	Dublin	Ireland	Point Theatre	—N/a	—N/a
January 10, 1990^{[E]}	London	England	Hammersmith Apollo	—N/a	—N/a
Latin America
January 19, 1990^{[F]}	São Paulo	Brazil	Estádio do Morumbi	—N/a	—N/a
January 26, 1990^{[F]}	Rio de Janeiro	Brazil	Praça da Apoteose	—N/a	—N/a
January 28, 1990	Bogotá	Colombia	Estadio El Campín	—N/a	—N/a
February 1, 1990^{[G]}	Buenos Aires	Argentina	Estadio José Amalfitani	—N/a	—N/a
February 6, 1990	Santiago	Chile	Estadio Nacional	—N/a	—N/a
February 9, 1990	Monterrey	Mexico	Estadio Tecnológico	—N/a	—N/a
February 10, 1990	Monterrey	Mexico	Estadio Tecnológico	—N/a	—N/a
February 16, 1990	Guadalajara	Mexico	Estadio Tecnológico	—N/a	—N/a
February 17, 1990	Guadalajara	Mexico	Estadio Tecnológico	—N/a	—N/a

Festivals and other miscellaneous performances
^{A} This concert was a part of "Heat Beat Live"
^{B} This concert was a part of the "Moscow Music Peace Festival"
^{C} This concert was a part of the "Milton Keynes Festival"
^{D} This concert was a part of the "Christmas Rock Festival"
^{E} This concert was a part of a charity benefit for "Nordoff–Robbins music therapy"
^{F} This concert was a part of "Hollywood Rock"
^{G} This concert was a part of the "Derby Rocks Festival"

Cancellations and rescheduled shows

January 7, 1989	Osaka, Japan	Osaka-jō Hall	Cancelled
February 25, 1989	Cincinnati, Ohio	Riverfront Coliseum	Cancelled
March 21, 1989	Auburn Hills, Michigan	The Palace of Auburn Hills	Moved to the Joe Louis Arena in Detroit, Michigan
March 22, 1989	Notre Dame, Indiana	Joyce Center	Cancelled
March 28, 1989	Rosemont, Illinois	Rosemont Horizon	Cancelled
May 6, 1989	Spokane, Washington	Spokane Coliseum	Rescheduled to May 7, 1989, and moved to the Beasley Coliseum in Pullman, Washington
May 31, 1989	Ottawa, Canada	Ottawa Civic Centre	Cancelled
June 1, 1989	Niagara Falls, New York	Niagara Falls Civic Center	Rescheduled to July 6, 1989
June 6, 1989	Old Orchard Beach, Maine	Seashore Performing Arts Center	Rescheduled to June 22, 1989
February 10, 1990	Querétaro City, Mexico	Estadio Corregidora	Cancelled
February 11, 1990	Querétaro City, Mexico	Estadio Corregidora	Cancelled
February 13, 1990	Mexico City, Mexico	Estadio Azulgrana	Cancelled
