= List of awards and nominations received by Bon Jovi =

Bon Jovi awards and nominations
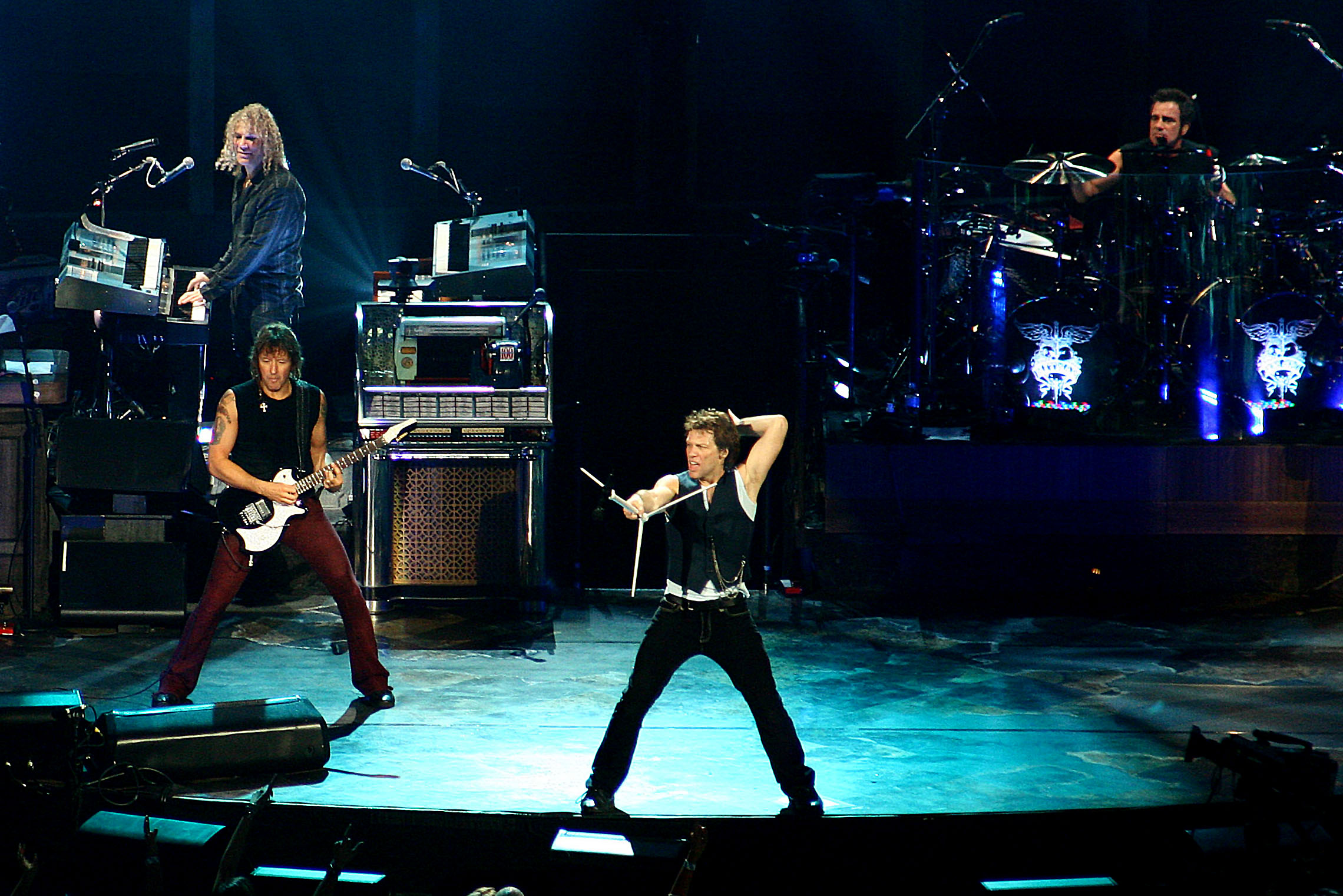
- Bon Jovi in Montreal in 2007 during the Lost Highway Tour
Awards and nominations
Award	Wins	Nominations
American Music Awards	2	6
Billboard	1	4
Brit	1	5
Echo	1	8
Grammy	1	9
Juno	0	3
MTV Europe	2	9
MTV VMA	2	4
Nickelodeon Kids' Choice	0	1
World Music	2	6
Billboard Touring Awards	6	6
CMT Music Awards	2	3
Helpmann Awards	0	1
Premios Oye!	1	1
My VH1 Music Awards	1	2
Japan Gold Disc Awards	3	0

Totals (Note: Certain award groups do not simply award one winner. They acknowledge several different recipients, have runners-up, and have third place. Since this is a specific recognition and is different from losing an award, runner-up mentions are considered wins in this award tally. For simplification and to avoid errors, each award in this list has been presumed to have had a prior nomination.)
- Wins: 25
- Nominations: 68

Bon Jovi is an American rock band which formed in Sayreville, New Jersey, in 1983 by five members, namesake Jon Bon Jovi (lead vocals, rhythm guitar), Richie Sambora (lead guitar, backing vocals), Alec John Such (bass guitar, backing vocals), Tico Torres (drums and percussion), and David Bryan (keyboards, backing vocals). Alec John Such was replaced by Hugh McDonald in 1994. Richie Sambora left the band in 2013 and was replaced by guitarist Phil X. Among the numerous nominations, the band has won 1 Grammy Award in 2007 for "Who Says You Can't Go Home" with Jennifer Nettles, 2 World Music Awards, 1 Award for Merit in 2004 and 1 Brit Award for Best International Group in 1996.

== American Music Awards ==
Year	Nominated work	Award	Result
1988	Bon Jovi	Favorite Pop/Rock Band/Duo/Group	Won
1988	Slippery When Wet	Favorite Pop/Rock Album	Nominated
1988	"Livin' on a Prayer"	Favorite Pop/Rock Single	Nominated
1990	Bon Jovi	Favorite Pop/Rock Band/Duo/Group	Nominated
1990	"I'll Be There for You"	Favorite Pop/Rock Single	Nominated
2004	Bon Jovi	Award of Merit	Won

== Billboard Music Awards ==
Year	Nominated work	Award	Result
2008	Bon Jovi	Top Touring Artist	Nominated
2011	Bon Jovi	Top Touring Artist	Nominated
2012	Bon Jovi	Top Touring Artist	Nominated
2014	Bon Jovi	Top Touring Artist	Won

== Billboard Touring Awards ==
Year	Nominated work	Award	Result
2008	Philadelphia Soul Charitable Foundation	Humanitarian Award	Won
2011	Bon Jovi Live	Eventful Fans' Choice Award	Won
2013	Because We Can: The Tour	Top Tour Award	Won
2013	Because We Can: The Tour	Top Draw Award	Won
2013	Because We Can: The Tour	Eventful Fans' Choice Award	Won
2016	Bon Jovi	Legend of Live	Won

== Brit Awards ==
Year	Nominee / work	Award	Result	R
1987	Bon Jovi	International Group	Nominated	
1988	Bon Jovi	International Group	Nominated	
1989	Bon Jovi	International Group	Nominated	
1990	Bon Jovi	International Group	Nominated	
1996	Bon Jovi	International Group	Won	

== CMT Music Awards ==
Year	Nominated work	Award	Result
2006	"Who Says You Can't Go Home" with Jennifer Nettles	Collaborative Video of the Year	Won
2008	"Till We Ain't Strangers Anymore" with LeAnn Rimes	Collaborative Video of the Year	Won
2008	"(You Want To) Make a Memory"	Group Video of the Year	Nominated

== Echo Awards ==
Year	Nominated work	Award	Result
1996	Bon Jovi	International Group of the Year	Nominated
2001	Crush	International Album of the Year by a Group	Won
2001	"It's My Life"	International Rock-Pop Single of the Year	Nominated
2002	One Wild Night Live 1985–2001	International Album of the Year by a Group	Nominated
2003	Bounce	International Album of the Year by a Group	Nominated
2006	Have a Nice Day	International Album of the Year by a Group	Nominated
2008	Lost Highway	International Album of the Year by a Group	Nominated
2011	Greatest Hits	International Album of the Year by a Group	Nominated

== Grammy Awards ==
Year	Nominated work	Award	Result
1997	Live From London	Best Music Video, Long Form	Nominated
2001	"It's My Life"	Best Rock Performance by a Duo or Group	Nominated
2001	Crush	Best Rock Album	Nominated
2003	"Everyday"	Best Pop Vocal Performance by a Duo or Group	Nominated
2004	"Misunderstood"	Best Pop Vocal Performance by a Duo or Group	Nominated
2007	"Who Says You Can't Go Home" with Jennifer Nettles	Best Country Collaboration with Vocals	Won
2008	Lost Highway	Best Pop Album	Nominated
2008	"(You Want To) Make a Memory"	Best Pop Vocal Performance by a Duo or Group	Nominated
2010	"We Weren't Born to Follow"	Best Pop Vocal Performance by a Duo or Group	Nominated

== Helpmann Awards ==
Year	Nominated work	Award	Result
2008	Lost Highway Tour	Best International Contemporary Concert	Nominated

== Japan Gold Disc Awards ==
Year	Nominated work	Award	Result
1989	Bon Jovi	THE GRAND PRIX ARTIST OF THE YEAR	Won
1989	New Jersey	THE GRAND PRIX ALBUM OF THE YEAR	Won
1989	New Jersey	ALBUM OF THE YEAR - Rock/Folk (Group) Division	Won

== Juno Awards ==
Year	Nominated work	Award	Result
1987	Slippery When Wet	International Album of the Year	Nominated
1994	Keep the Faith	Best Selling Album	Nominated
2008	Lost Highway	International Album of the Year	Nominated

== Premios Oye! ==
Year	Nominated work	Award	Result
2002	Bon Jovi	Mejor Artista Internacional con Trayectoria en México	Won

== MTV Europe Music Awards ==
Year	Nominated work	Award	Result
1995	Bon Jovi	Best Group	Nominated
1995	Bon Jovi	Best Rock	Won
1995	Bon Jovi	Best Live Act	Nominated
2000	Crush	Best Album	Nominated
2000	Bon Jovi	Best Group	Nominated
2000	Bon Jovi	Best Rock	Nominated
2002	Bon Jovi	Best Rock	Nominated
2010	Bon Jovi	Best Live Act	Nominated
2010	Bon Jovi	Global Icon	Won

== MTV Video Music Awards ==
Year	Nominated work	Award	Result
1987	"Livin' on a Prayer"	Best Stage Performance in a Video	Won
1987	"You Give Love a Bad Name"	Best Stage Performance in a Video	Nominated
1987	"Wanted Dead or Alive"	Best Editing in a Video	Nominated
1991	Bon Jovi	Michael Jackson Video Vanguard Award	Won

== My VH1 Music Awards ==
Year	Nominated work	Award	Result
2001	Bon Jovi	Hottest Live Show	Won
2001	Bon Jovi	My Favorite Group	Nominated

== Nickelodeon Kids' Choice Awards ==
Year	Nominated work	Award	Result
2013	Bon Jovi	Favorite Music Group	Nominated

== World Music Awards ==
Year	Nominated work	Award	Result
1995	Bon Jovi	Best Selling Rock Artist/Group	Won
2005	Bon Jovi	Chopard Diamond Award	Won
2007	Bon Jovi	Best Selling Rock Artist/Group	Nominated
2013	Bon Jovi	Best Group	Nominated
2013	Bon Jovi	Best Live Act	Nominated
2013	Bon Jovi	Best Album	Nominated
