= The Crush Tour (album) =

Video by Bon Jovi
- Released: May 28, 2001
- Recorded: August 30, 2000
- Venue: Letzigrund Stadium (Zürich, Switzerland)
- Genre: Hard rock
- Director: Anthony Bongiovi

Bon Jovi chronology
Live from London (1995)	The Crush Tour (2001)	This Left Feels Right Live (2004)

The Crush Tour is a third concert video by American band Bon Jovi from the European leg of their Crush Tour. It was recorded on August 30, 2000 in Zürich, Switzerland. It was directed by Anthony Bongiovi. It was released on DVD in 2001.

== Track listing ==
No.	Title	Writer(s)	Length
1.	"Intro" (Just Older with audio only)	Bon Jovi, Falcon	1:35
2.	"Livin' on a Prayer"	Jon Bon Jovi, Richie Sambora, Desmond Child	5:51
3.	"You Give Love a Bad Name"	Bon Jovi, Sambora, Child	4:20
4.	"Captain Crash & The Beauty Queen From Mars"	Bon Jovi, Sambora	6:07
5.	"Say It Isn't So"	Bon Jovi, Billy Falcon	4:04
6.	"One Wild Night"	Bon Jovi, Sambora, Child	4:26
7.	"Born to Be My Baby"	Bon Jovi, Sambora, Child	5:15
8.	"It's My Life"	Bon Jovi, Sambora, Max Martin	3:55
9.	"Bed of Roses"	Bon Jovi	8:42
10.	"Two Story Town"	Bon Jovi, Sambora, Dean Grakal, Mark Hudson	5:20
11.	"Just Older"	Bon Jovi, Falcon	5:28
12.	"Runaway"	Bon Jovi, George Karak	4:56
13.	"Lay Your Hands on Me"	Bon Jovi, Sambora	6:38
14.	"I'll Sleep When I'm Dead"	Bon Jovi, Sambora, Child	7:17
15.	"Bad Medicine"	Bon Jovi, Sambora, Child	6:35
16.	"Wanted Dead or Alive"	Bon Jovi, Sambora	5:44
17.	"I'll Be There for You"	Bon Jovi, Sambora, Child	8:23
18.	"Next 100 Years"	Bon Jovi, Sambora, Child	6:25
19.	"Someday I'll Be Saturday Night"	Bon Jovi, Sambora, Child	7:42
20.	"Keep the Faith"	Bon Jovi, Sambora, Child	8:37
21.	"Thank You for Loving Me" (Ending credits with audio only)	Bon Jovi, Sambora	5:02

== DVD Bonus Features ==
- Backstage with Bon Jovi
- It's My Life (Music Video)
- Say It Isn't So (Music Video)
- Photo Gallery
- Discography

== Personnel ==
- Jon Bon Jovi – lead vocals, guitar
- Richie Sambora – guitar, backing vocals, talkbox
- Hugh McDonald – bass, backing vocals
- Tico Torres – drums, percussion
- David Bryan – keyboards, backing vocals

== Certifications ==
Region	Certification	Certified units/sales
Brazil (Pro-Música Brasil)	Gold	25,000^{*}
United States (RIAA)	Platinum	100,000^{^}
^{*} Sales figures based on certification alone.^{^} Shipments figures based on certification alone.
