= When We Were Beautiful =

- Directed by: Phil Griffin
- Produced by: Jon Kamen; Jack Rovner; Justin Wilkes
- Starring: Jon Bon Jovi; Richie Sambora; Tico Torres; David Bryan
- Release dates: April 29, 2009 (Tribeca Film Festival); October 24, 2009 (United States)
- Running time: 75 minutes
- Country: United States
- Language: English

When We Were Beautiful, also known as Bon Jovi: When We Were Beautiful, is a 2009 feature documentary of the American rock band Bon Jovi, marking the band's 25th year.

Premiered at the 2009 Tribeca Film Festival as a work in progress production, the film documents Bon Jovi's Lost Highway Tour in 2007 and includes interviews with band members. The film is directed by Phil Griffin and produced by Jon Kamen, Jack Rovner and Justin Wilkes. The production company for the release is Radical Media.

== Production ==
Phil Griffin stated that “throughout the process of working with Bon Jovi, I was amazed at the candor and humility Jon and his band showed me. The result is not a neatly wrapped up bundle of staged interviews and musical interludes, but rather a series of open and sometimes difficult conversations, explored against a backdrop of music spanning 25 years. It is a film about the peace of Tico, the complexity of Richie, the drive of Jon and the brutal honesty of Dave. It is their willingness to share their stories that gives us what I hope is a very human story—that humanity is what I believe has seen this band stand the test of time.”

== Release ==
The film premiered at the 2009 Tribeca Film Festival on April 29, 2009. Jon Bon Jovi was present at the premiere. The film explored the band's 25-year career as well as looking at their live show on their 2008 Lost Highway tours. The documentary premiered on SHOWtime October 24 in its entirety, and an edited version was released as a DVD with certain copies of the band's 11th studio album, The Circle, released in the US on November 10 and the edited version is also included on the Live at Madison Square Garden Blu-ray.

A book of the same name as the film was also released in hardcover form on November 3, 2009 and in paperback form on November 2, 2010.

When We Were Beautiful the single was also released.
