= Living in Sin (song) =

1989 single by Bon Jovi

Single by Bon Jovi

from the album New Jersey
- B-side: "Love Is War"
- Released: September 1989
- Length: 4:39
- Label: Mercury
- Songwriter: Jon Bon Jovi
- Producer: Bruce Fairbairn

Bon Jovi singles chronology
| "Lay Your Hands on Me" (1989) | "Living in Sin" (1989) | "Keep the Faith" (1992) |

Music video
- Living in Sin on YouTube

"Living in Sin" is a song by American rock band Bon Jovi. It was written by lead singer Jon Bon Jovi and was released in September 1989 as the fifth single from their fourth album, New Jersey (1988). It was the fifth single from New Jersey to chart within the US top 10, peaking at number nine on both the Billboard Hot 100 and Cash Box Top 100 charts. It was also a top-20 hit in Switzerland, peaking at number 20.

== Song structure ==
The song features a slow beat, driven by a strong rhythm by then-bass guitarist Alec John Such. "Living In Sin" bears a delivery of emotional lyrics, driving guitars, and interspersed keyboards. The themes discussed are cohabitation and that true love is stronger than anything, despite what other people may say ('I call it love, they call it living in sin'). When performed live, the band often play a short cover of "Chapel of Love" during the outro of the song.

== Music video ==
The music video for the song was filmed in all black and white, just like "Born to Be My Baby". While the video does feature some shots of the band performing, primarily of Jon Bon Jovi and Richie Sambora, most of the video focuses on a fictional young couple and their struggle to sustain a relationship despite the disapproval of the girl's strict Catholic parents. The promo is noted for several of its steamy romance/sex scenes, including on a beach, in a car, and in a hotel room. The final scene of the video shows the girl running away from home to meet up with her boyfriend, and then the girl's parents walking in on them sleeping together in a hotel room. They take her home, and the video ends with the boyfriend driving in his car to the girl's home, where she snap-decides to run away with him.

== Charts ==
| Chart (1989–1990) | Peak position |
|---|---|
| Australia (ARIA) | 64 |
| Switzerland (Schweizer Hitparade) | 20 |
| UK Singles (OCC) | 35 |
| US Billboard Hot 100 | 9 |
| US Mainstream Rock (Billboard) | 37 |
| US Cash Box Top 100 | 9 |

== Release history ==
| Region | Date | Format(s) | Label(s) | Ref. |
|---|---|---|---|---|
| United States | September 1989 | 7-inch vinyl; CD; cassette | Mercury | |
| Japan | February 5, 1990 | CD | Mercury | |
