= Have a Nice Day (Bon Jovi song) =

2005 single by Bon Jovi

Single by Bon Jovi

from the album Have a Nice Day
- B-side: "The Radio Saved My Life Tonight"; "I Get a Rush"; "Miss Fourth of July"
- Released: August 8, 2005
- Genre: Hard rock
- Length: 3:51 (album version); 3:36 (digital single version)
- Label: Island
- Songwriters: Jon Bon Jovi; Richie Sambora; John Shanks
- Producers: Jon Bon Jovi; Richie Sambora; John Shanks

Bon Jovi singles chronology
"It's My Life (2003)" (2003)	"Have a Nice Day" (2005)	"Welcome to Wherever You Are" (2005)

Music video
- "Have a Nice Day" on YouTube

"Have a Nice Day" is a song by American rock band Bon Jovi. Written, composed and produced by Jon Bon Jovi, Richie Sambora, and John Shanks, "Have a Nice Day" was the first single released from the band's 2005 album of the same name. The overall message of the song can be taken several ways, but reflects an overall theme of both tolerance and defiance, and its title has a discordant effect from its message. Musically, the song features a propulsive blast of power chords, drum beats, and sneering vocals, as well as choruses and hooks similar to Bon Jovi's previous material. It received a positive reception from critics, some of whom praised the song's arrangement and message; both favorable and unfavorable comparisons were made to the band's previous hit "It's My Life".

"Have a Nice Day" was released to radio on August 8, 2005, and as a physical and digital single on August 30, 2005. It peaked in the top ten in eleven countries, appearing on year-end charts in five of them as well. Although it only peaked at number 53 on the US Billboard Hot 100, "Have a Nice Day" peaked at number six on the Adult Top 40 chart and at number 38 on both the Pop 100 and Mainstream Rock Tracks charts. "Have a Nice Day" has been certified Gold in both the United States and Australia, signifying sales of 500,000 units in the United States and shipments of 35,000 units in Australia. Bon Jovi has performed "Have a Nice Day" live, and included the song on their greatest hits album Greatest Hits, as well as on several of their video albums. The music video for "Have a Nice Day" was designed by ad agency Deutsch as part of a broader ad campaign to promote the album Have a Nice Day, and focuses on what the creative director of Deutsch describes as a 'pissed-off smiley face'.

== Background ==
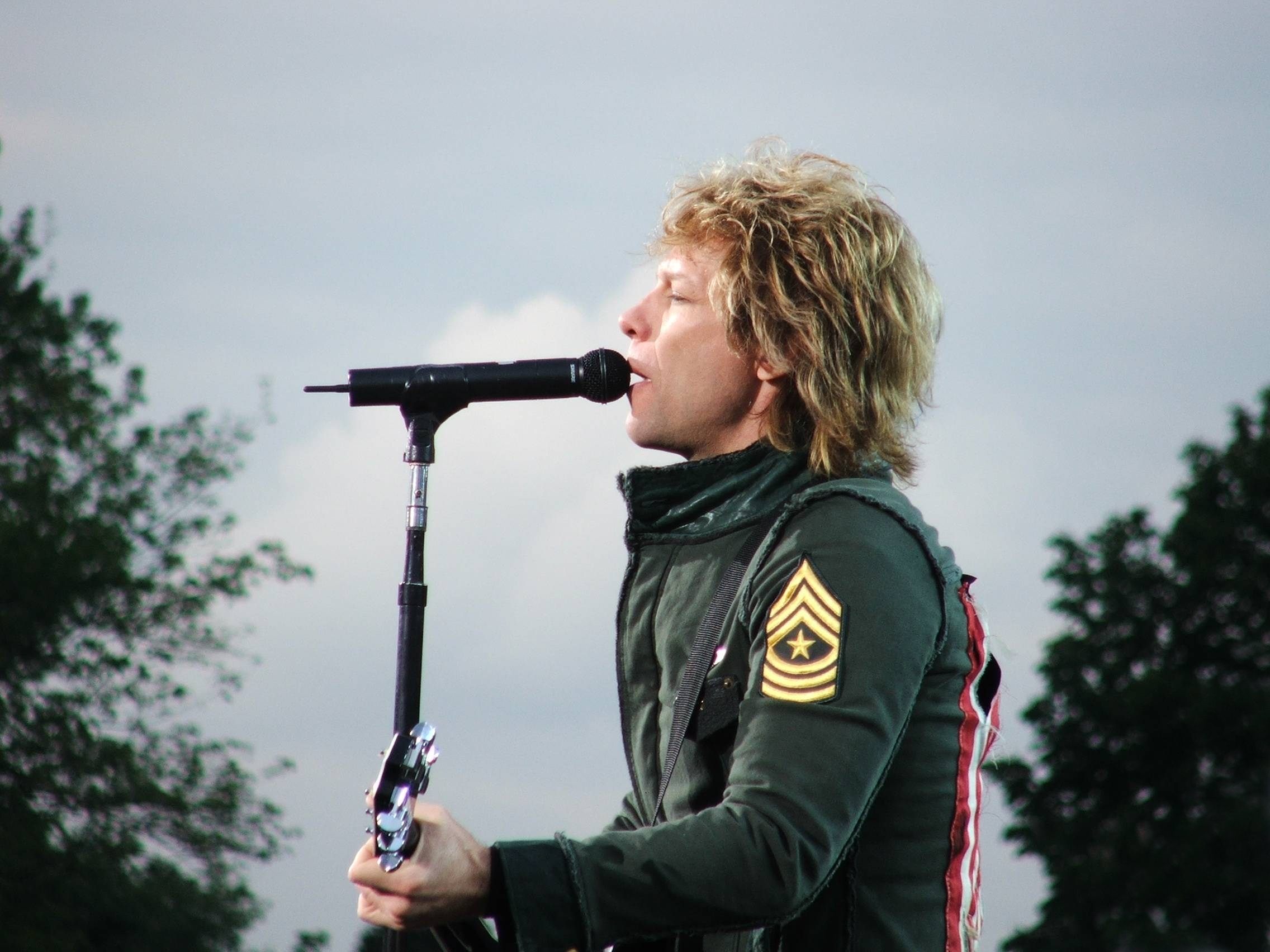
Jon Bon Jovi, one of the three co-writers of "Have a Nice Day".

"Have a Nice Day" was written, composed, and produced by Jon Bon Jovi, Richie Sambora, and John Shanks. The message of "Have a Nice Day" was intended by Jon Bon Jovi to be able to be taken multiple ways; one can take the term literally, or take it differently. Jon Bon Jovi regarded the overall point of the song as to promote tolerance between those of different beliefs. Bon Jovi commented in an interview that "You can take [the message of the song] literally... or the way it's taken here, 'have a nice day' – end of conversation. That's really the point of the song. In order to not seem on a moral high ground, the best way to say is you have a difference of opinion is to end the conversation. We all can live in the world together.... everybody should get along." However, the song is also a sarcastic and defiant reaction to Jon Bon Jovi's disappointment over George W. Bush's re-election in 2004.

== Composition ==
"Have a Nice Day"
A 22-second sample of "Have a Nice Day", featuring portions of the first chorus and the second verse. The song features "trademark big Bon Jovi choruses and hooks" and a "propulsive blast of power chords, drum beats, and sneering vocals".

According to the sheet music published at Musicnotes.com by Alfred Publishing Company Inc., "Have a Nice Day" is set in the time signature of common time written in the key of E Major with a "driving rock" tempo of 130 beats per minute. Jon Bon Jovi's vocal range in the song spans from B_{3}-C♯_{5}. The sheet music lists the musical style of the song as arena rock, hard rock, pop rock, and album rock. It features "trademark big Bon Jovi choruses and catchy hooks" and has a message that can be taken in different ways. It has also been described as 'defiant' and as containing a "propulsive blast of power chords, drum beats, and sneering vocals". The song's defiant message is intentionally discordant from its "smilely-face sounding" title, and its chorus "counsels renewed conviction in the face of setbacks, optimism against opposition, standing your moral ground regardless of the consequences".

== Release and promotion ==
"Have a Nice Day" was released to radio on August 8, 2005, and physical and digital singles were released in various regions on August 30, 2005. Two days later, Island Records released the song as a CD single in Japan. In Australia, the song was issued as a CD single on September 5, 2005, while in the United Kingdom, it was released on the same format on September 12. Bon Jovi performed the song live on The Oprah Winfrey Show, and ran a promotion on MLB.com in September 2005 which gave a full-length video stream of the music video for "Have a Nice Day". Bon Jovi also allowed the video for "Have a Nice Day" to be viewed on their website.

== Critical reception ==
Upon its release, "Have a Nice Day" met with positive critical reception. Wayne Parry of the Associated Press noted the song "has those trademark big Bon Jovi choruses and catchy hooks that have hit single written all over them", while Katie Moten of RTÉ Ten argued the song is "no Livin' on a Prayer, but does have that same positive message that Bon Jovi deliver so well". Dennis Mahoney of Paste Magazine was more critical, calling the track "unremarkable" and "so similar to 2000's "It's My Life" that I kept hearing the older, better (but not that much better) song". In his review of Bon Jovi's album of the same title, Stephen Thomas Erlewine of AllMusic selected "Have a Nice Day" as a track pick from the album. Billboard magazine gave the song a positive review, crediting it as having a "pounding beat" and "catchy guitar riffs", also comparing the song to the group's previous hit "It's My Life". Kitty Empire of The Guardian stated in her review of Have a Nice Day that "[John] Kerry supporter Jon Bon Jovi takes a snarky stance in ['Have a Nice Day'], reportedly in response to the re-election of George W Bush. Unlike the Rolling Stones's 'Sweet Neo-Con', though, his ire is sufficiently fuzzy for it to work".

== Live performances ==
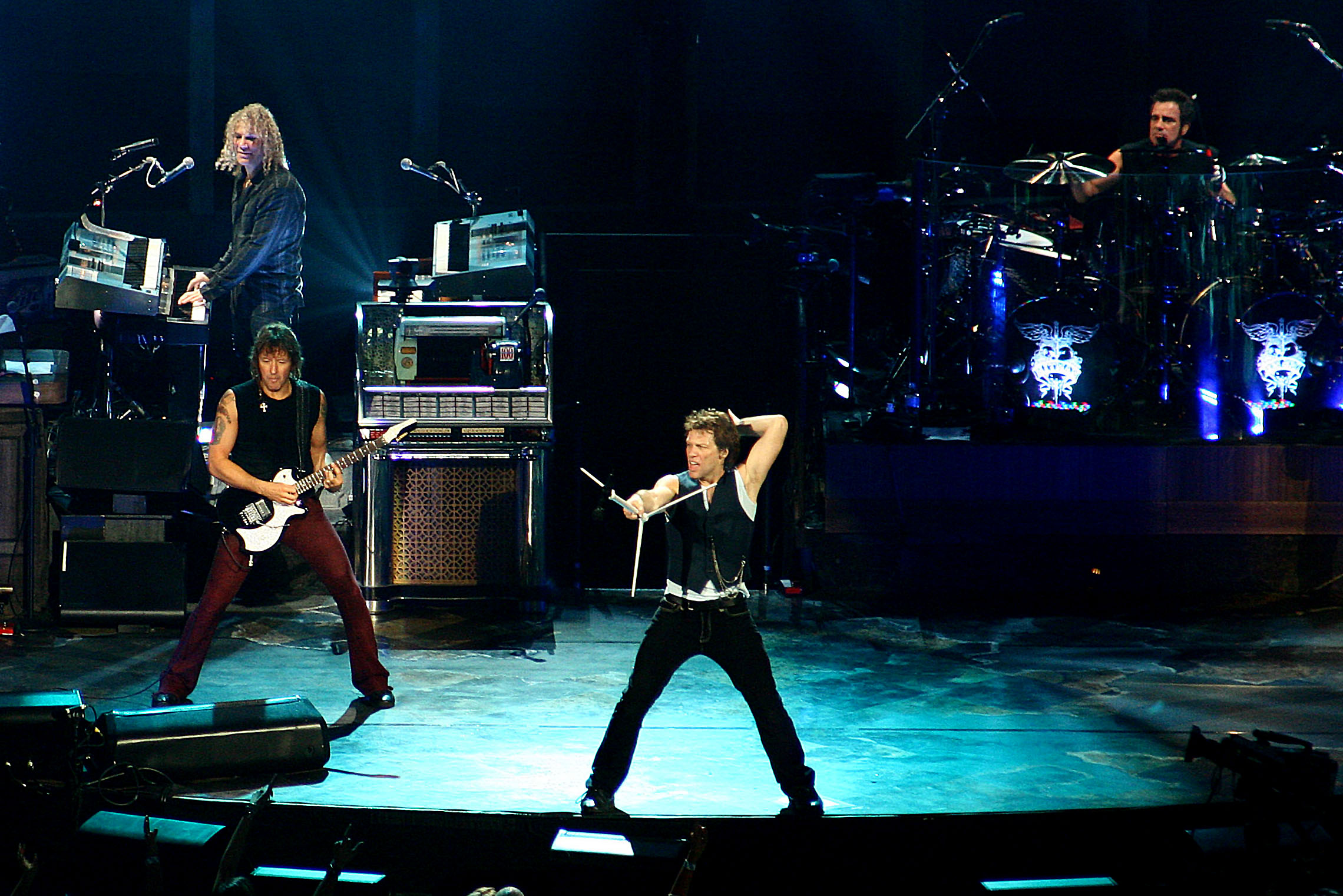
Bon Jovi performing live in 2007

Bon Jovi first performed a portion of "Have a Nice Day" at the 2004 American Music Awards, at which the band accepted a special award; Bon Jovi later performed the full version of the song at the Live 8 concert in July 2005. Since its release as a single and inclusion on the album Have a Nice Day in 2005, "Have a Nice Day" has been performed live at every full-length Bon Jovi concert. At a concert held at the Nationwide Arena in Columbus, Ohio on May 10, 2011, they performed the song, which, according to Kevin Joy of The Columbus Dispatch, "blended well into the mix" of the other songs. At the performance, Jon Bon Jovi wore a vest and leather pants; guitarist Richie Sambora was absent from the concert. At a concert at FedEx Forum in Memphis, Tennessee attended by almost 16,000 people, Bon Jovi performed an "underwhelming" version of "Have a Nice Day". "Have a Nice Day" was performed as the seventeenth song on the band's setlist for a concert at the Philips Arena in Atlanta.

== Other versions and uses in popular culture ==
On the sixth season of reality television show American Idol, contestant Melinda Doolittle covered "Have a Nice Day". The song was included as downloadable content for the rhythm video game Rock Band 3 as part of the "Bon Jovi's Greatest Hits: Rock Band Edition" track pack. It was included on Bon Jovi's greatest hits album Greatest Hits, and live versions of the song were included on the band's video albums Live From the Have a Nice Day Tour, Live at Madison Square Garden, and Greatest Hits – The Ultimate Video Collection. The song was featured in the film Win Win.

== Music video ==
The 'pissed off smiley face' on which the video center, engraved into a field as a crop circle.

The music video for "Have a Nice Day" was created by Deutsch, an advertising agency. The video centers around what the creative director of Deutsch, Eric Hirshberg, describes as a 'pissed off smiley face', which appears on, among other places, a mobile phone and a crop circle. The video was designed as part of a larger campaign to promote Bon Jovi's album Have a Nice Day – the album features the smiley face on its cover, and merchandise for the Have a Nice Day Tour was designed to feature the face as well. Hirshberg regarded the marketing strategy behind the music video and campaign as "a new model for ad agencies and the music industry".

The music video opens with Jon Bon Jovi and Richie Sambora pulling up to a small crowd. After signing a few autographs, a person in the crowd hands Jon Bon Jovi an album to sign, but he instead signs it with a smiley face. The person takes his mobile phone and takes a picture of it, sending it to his friends. The smiley face then appears all over the city, on places such as buildings, mailboxes, and traffic cones. The face is stuck onto citizens by other people, appears on T-shirts and necklaces, and is worn as a tattoo. The video closes with Bon Jovi leaving a concert in a helicopter, and noticing the face engraved into a field as a crop circle.

== Track listings ==
Digital single

1. "Have a Nice Day" — 3:36

CD single

1. "Have a Nice Day" (Album Version) — 3:51
2. "The Radio Saved My Life Tonight" — 5:15
3. "I Get a Rush" — 3:08
4. "Miss Fourth of July" — 8:01

Import single

1. "Have a Nice Day" (Album Version)
2. "The Radio Saved My Life Tonight"

Germany CD 1

1. "Have a Nice Day" (Album Version) — 3:48
2. "Radio Saved My Life Tonight" (Live at Atlantic City 2004) — 5:24

Germany CD 2

1. "Have a Nice Day" (Album Version)
2. "I Get a Rush" (Live at Atlantic City 2004)
3. "Miss Fourth of July" (Live at Atlantic City 2004)
4. "Have a Nice Day"

== Charts ==
=== Weekly charts ===
Chart (2005–2006)	Peak position
Australia (ARIA)	8
Austria (Ö3 Austria Top 40)	7
Belgium (Ultratop 50 Flanders)	27
Belgium (Ultratip Bubbling Under Wallonia)	3
Canada CHR/Pop Top 30 (Radio & Records)	28
Canada Hot AC Top 30 (Radio & Records)	7
Canada Rock Top 30 (Radio & Records)	16
Europe (Eurochart Hot 100)	6
Finland (Suomen virallinen lista)	8
Germany (GfK)	7
Greece (IFPI)	7
Hungary (Rádiós Top 40)	7
Ireland (IRMA)	18
Italy (FIMI)	7
Japan (Oricon)	10
Netherlands (Dutch Top 40)	6
Netherlands (Single Top 100)	5
Norway (VG-lista)	8
Scottish Singles Sales (Official Charts)	2
Spain (Promusicae)	2
Sweden (Sverigetopplistan)	2
Switzerland (Schweizer Hitparade)	10
UK Singles (Official Charts)	6
US Billboard Hot 100	53
US Adult Pop Airplay (Billboard)	6
US Mainstream Rock (Billboard)	38

=== Year-end charts ===
Chart (2005)	Position
Australia (ARIA)	68
Austria (Ö3 Austria Top 40)	57
Europe (Eurochart Hot 100)	86
Germany (Media Control GfK)	78
Hungary (Rádiós Top 40)	25
Italy (Musica e dischi)	98
Netherlands (Dutch Top 40)	61
Netherlands (Single Top 100)	89
Sweden (Hitlistan)	87
Switzerland (Schweizer Hitparade)	62
UK Singles (OCC)	178
US Adult Top 40 (Billboard)	54

Chart (2006)	Position
Hungary (Rádiós Top 40)	71

== Certifications ==
Region	Certification	Certified units/sales
Australia (ARIA)	Platinum	70,000^{‡}
United States (RIAA)	Gold	500,000^{^}
^{^} Shipments figures based on certification alone.^{‡} Sales+streaming figures based on certification alone.
