= Have a Nice Day (Bon Jovi album) =

Studio album by Bon Jovi
- Released: September 20, 2005
- Recorded: 2004–2005
- Studios: Capitol (Hollywood, California); Henson (Hollywood, California); Ocean Way (Hollywood, California); Sanctuary Sound II (New Jersey)
- Genres: Hard rock; pop rock
- Length: 49:54
- Labels: Island; Mercury
- Producers: John Shanks; Jon Bon Jovi; Richie Sambora; Rick Parashar

Bon Jovi chronology
100,000,000 Bon Jovi Fans Can't Be Wrong (2004)	Have a Nice Day (2005)	Lost Highway (2007)

Singles from Have a Nice Day
- 1. "Have a Nice Day" Released: August 8, 2005; 2. "Welcome to Wherever You Are" Released: December 16, 2005; 3. "Who Says You Can't Go Home" Released: March 27, 2006

Have a Nice Day is the ninth studio album by American rock band Bon Jovi, released on September 20, 2005. Produced by John Shanks, the album was recorded at Sanctuary Sound II in New Jersey, and Ocean Way Recording in Hollywood, California.

Have a Nice Day was originally recorded in the summer of 2004 and planned for release in early 2005. However, due to misunderstandings between the band and its record company, the album was delayed. The band wanted to write and record more songs, remove others from the original track list, and in the process, altered existing album tracks.

Have a Nice Day peaked at number two in both the US and UK. In the US, it sold over 202,000 copies in the first week, making it Bon Jovi's best first-week sales in the band's history at that time. The album was eventually certified platinum by the RIAA.

The album produced the hit singles "Have a Nice Day" and "Who Says You Can't Go Home". Have a Nice Day has received mixed reviews by music critics. It was commonly commented that Jon Bon Jovi was "stretching" his lyrical abilities.

== Background ==
Jon Bon Jovi and Richie Sambora headed into the studio with producer and songwriter John Shanks in summer of 2004 to begin working on a band's ninth studio album. They started to write songs and songs came very quick. After Jon and Richie co-wrote all the songs with Shanks, they recorded them immediately using a drum machine. Sambora and Shanks played all the guitar parts, Jon recorded all the vocals and there were no bass player or drummer in the studio. Later in the recording sessions, David Bryan, Tico Torres and Hugh McDonald recorded their parts. In the meantime, the band was doing finishing touches on their boxset 100,000,000 Bon Jovi Fans Can't Be Wrong (2004). Jon planned to turn the album over to record company right before Christmas of 2004., but he changed his mind. In December 2004, he went to Sanctuary Sound Studio to write more songs. When the band regrouped in 2005, they recorded four more songs and also worked on the revised versions of the original songs.

== Lyrical themes ==
The lyrical themes center around political changes that happened in United States in that period and the state of music business, but also reflect personal and introspective views on issues that Jon Bon Jovi had while growing up, which he had never discussed before. He said: "I've always kept this 'chin up, glass is half-full' kind of optimism, and [now] I showed some chinks in the armor." "The song "Last Man Standing" depicts the band leader's unhappiness with the music industry. He says it reflects his "disgust of the music business in general, and its lack of true vision when it comes to supporting the artistry of developing a song, the songwriter and the bands on the road."" He explained: "Instead of creating what Andy Warhol once called '15 minutes of fame,' I think it's down to just three minutes and 30 seconds." "I don't know how this industry is ever going to have another Bob Dylan when it's all about the single, [not] the album and the vision and that inspiration. [It's] all for the sake of a 99-cent download so they can sell bulk and make their bonuses. It's heartbreaking."

== Release and promotion ==
The album's track list, release dates for United States and Canada, and radio release date for the first single were announced on July 14, 2005. The first single, the title track "Have a Nice Day", premiered on radio stations worldwide on July 18, 2005. On September 2, 2005, it was announced that a full-length version of the song "Last Man Standing" was available for listening in the discography section on the band's official website.

== Critical and commercial reception ==
Professional ratings
Review scores
Source	Rating
AllMusic	2.5/5 stars
Blogcritics	8/10 stars
Entertainment Weekly	B−
Robert Christgau	C+
Rolling Stone	3/5 stars

Stephen Thomas Erlewine gave Have a Nice Day 2.5 stars out of 5, saying that the album "picks up where 2002's Bounce left off, showcasing a harder, heavier band than either 2000's Crush or Jon Bon Jovi's 1997 solo effort, Destination Anywhere. Not only that, but this 2005 album finds Jon Bon Jovi picking up on the serious undercurrent of Bounce, writing a series of angry, somber neo-protest songs that form the heart of this record." Blogcritics gave the album 8 stars out of 10 stating that "while their glory days are behind them, there's still a lot left in the tank for Bon Jovi when they want to be a band. The chemistry between Jon and Richie is as strong as ever, and the songwriting prowess they have is a well that never seems to run dry for these guys. While not their best work, this is their best in a long time." Robert Christgau gave the album a grade of C+, stating that it is "A depressing argument for the existence of that intellectual fairy tale, the passive mass audience." Christian Hoard from Rolling Stone gave the album 3 stars out of 5 saying that it is "reliable as it is contained: Acoustic ballads such as 'Bells of Freedom' are vaguely icky, but powerhouse anthems like 'I Want to Be Loved' pack almost as much singalong potential as 'Livin' on a Prayer' did back in the day."

== Track listing ==
Standard edition
No.	Title	Writer(s)	Length
1.	"Have a Nice Day"	Jon Bon Jovi; Richie Sambora; John Shanks	3:48
2.	"I Want to Be Loved"	Bon Jovi; Sambora; Shanks	3:49
3.	"Welcome to Wherever You Are"	Bon Jovi; Sambora; Shanks	3:47
4.	"Who Says You Can't Go Home"	Bon Jovi; Sambora	4:40
5.	"Last Man Standing"	Bon Jovi; Billy Falcon	4:37
6.	"Bells of Freedom"	Bon Jovi; Sambora; Desmond Child	4:55
7.	"Wildflower"	Bon Jovi	4:13
8.	"Last Cigarette"	Bon Jovi; David Bryan	3:38
9.	"I Am"	Bon Jovi; Sambora; Shanks	3:53
10.	"Complicated"	Bon Jovi; Falcon; Max Martin	3:37
11.	"Novocaine"	Bon Jovi	4:49
12.	"Story of My Life"	Bon Jovi; Falcon	4:08
Total length:			49:54

Original bonus track
No.	Title	Writer(s)	Length
13.	"Who Says You Can't Go Home" (duet version with Jennifer Nettles)	Bon Jovi; Sambora	3:50
Total length:			53:44

Europe bonus track
No.	Title	Writer(s)	Length
13.	"Dirty Little Secret"	Bon Jovi; Sambora; Shanks; Child	3:37
Total length:			53:31

UK, Australia and Asia bonus tracks
No.	Title	Writer(s)	Length
13.	"Dirty Little Secret"	Bon Jovi; Sambora; Shanks; Child	3:37
14.	"Unbreakable"	Bon Jovi; Sambora; Bryan	3:52
Total length:			57:23

Japan bonus tracks
No.	Title	Writer(s)	Length
13.	"Dirty Little Secret"	Bon Jovi; Sambora; Shanks; Child	3:37
14.	"Unbreakable"	Bon Jovi; Sambora; Bryan	3:52
15.	"These Open Arms"	Bon Jovi; Child	3:42
Total length:			61:05

2010 special edition bonus tracks
No.	Title	Writer(s)	Length
13.	"Who Says You Can't Go Home" (duet version with Jennifer Nettles)	Bon Jovi; Sambora	3:50
14.	"Have a Nice Day" (live)	Bon Jovi; Sambora; Shanks	4:05
15.	"Last Man Standing" (live)	Bon Jovi; Falcon	5:35
16.	"Story of My Life" (live)	Bon Jovi; Falcon	5:22
17.	"Who Says You Can't Go Home" (duet version with Jennifer Nettles, live)	Bon Jovi; Sambora	8:23
Total length:			77:09

== Personnel ==
Bon Jovi

- Jon Bon Jovi – lead and backing vocals
- Richie Sambora – guitars, backing vocals
- David Bryan – keyboards
- Tico Torres – drums, percussion

Additional musicians

- Hugh McDonald – bass
- Paul Buckmaster – string arranger (track 7)
- David Campbell – string arranger (track 3)
- Dan Dugmore – steel guitar (track 13)
- Dann Huff – mandolin and bouzouki (track 13)
- Jennifer Nettles – duet vocals (track 13)
- B.C. Smith – programming (tracks 8, 11, 12)
- Jonathan Yudkin – fiddle and mandolin (track 13)

Recording personnel

- Gary McGrath – 2nd engineer
- Jeremy Wheatley – mixing (track 1)
- Chris Lord-Alge – mixing (track 2–6, 9–11)
- Tom Lord Alge – mixing (track 7, 8, 11, 12)
- Justin Niebank – mixing (track 13)

== Charts ==
=== Weekly charts ===
Weekly chart performance for Have a Nice Day
Chart (2005–2006)	Peak position
Australian Albums (ARIA)	1
Austrian Albums (Ö3 Austria)	1
Belgian Albums (Ultratop Flanders)	5
Belgian Albums (Ultratop Wallonia)	23
Canadian Albums (Billboard)	1
Danish Albums (Hitlisten)	19
Dutch Albums (Album Top 100)	1
European Albums (Billboard)	1
Finnish Albums (Suomen virallinen lista)	4
French Albums (SNEP)	14
German Albums (Offizielle Top 100)	1
Hungarian Albums (MAHASZ)	6
Irish Albums (IRMA)	9
Italian Albums (FIMI)	4
Japanese Albums (Oricon)	1
Mexican Albums (Top 100 Mexico)	1
New Zealand Albums (RMNZ)	26
Norwegian Albums (VG-lista)	11
Portuguese Albums (AFP)	7
Scottish Albums (Official Charts)	2
Spanish Albums (Promusicae)	2
Swedish Albums (Sverigetopplistan)	3
Swiss Albums (Schweizer Hitparade)	1
Taiwanese Albums (Five Music)	1
UK Albums (Official Charts)	2
US Billboard 200	2
US Top Rock Albums (Billboard)	7

=== Year-end charts ===
2005 year-end chart performance for Have a Nice Day
Chart (2005)	Position
Australian Albums (ARIA)	73
Austrian Albums (Ö3 Austria)	20
Belgian Albums (Ultratop Flanders)	81
Dutch Albums (Album Top 100)	63
German Albums (Offizielle Top 100)	19
Japanese Albums (Oricon)	50
Swiss Albums (Schweizer Hitparade)	19
UK Albums (OCC)	128
US Billboard 200	135
Worldwide Albums (IFPI)	30

2006 year-end chart performance for Have a Nice Day
Chart (2006)	Position
US Billboard 200	68

== Certifications and sales ==
Certifications and sales for Have a Nice Day
Region	Certification	Certified units/sales
Australia (ARIA)	Platinum	70,000^{^}
Austria (IFPI Austria)	Platinum	30,000^{*}
Brazil (Pro-Música Brasil)	Gold	50,000^{*}
Canada (Music Canada)	Platinum	100,000^{^}
Germany (BVMI)	Platinum	200,000^{^}
Greece (IFPI Greece)	Gold	10,000^{^}
Japan (RIAJ)	Platinum	355,000
Spain (Promusicae)	Gold	50,000^{^}
Switzerland (IFPI Switzerland)	Platinum	40,000^{^}
United Kingdom (BPI)	Gold	100,000^{^}
United States (RIAA)	Platinum	1,000,000^{^}
^{*} Sales figures based on certification alone.^{^} Shipments figures based on certification alone.
