= Lay Your Hands on Me (Bon Jovi song) =

1989 single by Bon Jovi

Single by Bon Jovi

from the album New Jersey
- B-side: "Runaway" (live)
- Released: May 1989
- Genre: Glam metal; arena rock
- Length: 5:59 (album version); 3:49 (radio edit)
- Label: Mercury
- Songwriters: Jon Bon Jovi; Richie Sambora
- Producer: Bruce Fairbairn

Bon Jovi singles chronology
| "I'll Be There for You" (1989) | "Lay Your Hands on Me" (1989) | "Living in Sin" (1989) |

Music video
- Lay Your Hands on Me on YouTube

"Lay Your Hands on Me" is a song by American rock band Bon Jovi. It was released in May 1989 as the fourth single from the band's fourth studio album, New Jersey (1988). The song peaked at number seven on the US Billboard Hot 100, becoming the band's fourth single from New Jersey to chart within the top 10. The song also entered the top 10 in New Zealand, where it reached number eight on the RIANZ Singles Chart.

== Music video ==
The video for this song was culled from performances at the Tacoma Dome in Tacoma, WA and the Memorial Coliseum in Portland, OR during The Jersey Syndicate Tour. It was also released to home video on New Jersey: The Videos and Cross Road: The Videos. The MTV video for "Lay Your Hands On Me" was shot in Salt Lake in May 1989.

== Live performances ==
For live performances through the 1980s and '90s, Sambora would use a double neck guitar with one neck tuned to drop D and the other tuned to Standard tuning. Examples of this can be seen in the official video clip, as well as in the Live From London DVD. During the 2000s he began using a single-necked guitar, as can be seen in The Crush Tour DVD. The song was performed a few times on the Lost Highway Tour. During performances on The Circle Tour, the song was performed with Sambora on lead vocals. Since then it has been played regularly on the "This House Is Not For Sale" tour.

== This Left Feels Right version ==
"Lay Your Hands on Me" was re-recorded for 2003's This Left Feels Right album. The new version is in a laid-back acoustic style, featuring Sambora playing the Mandocello as the primary instrument. This version was performed at several concerts on the Have a Nice Day Tour. However, the first acoustic performance of this song was in 1992, from the concert An Evening with Bon Jovi Live in New York.

== Charts ==
=== Weekly charts ===
| Chart (1989) | Peak position |
|---|---|
| Australia (ARIA) | 23 |
| Netherlands (Dutch Top 40 Tipparade) | 10 |
| Netherlands (Single Top 100) | 47 |
| New Zealand (Recorded Music NZ) | 8 |
| Switzerland (Schweizer Hitparade) | 16 |
| UK Singles (OCC) | 18 |
| US Billboard Hot 100 | 7 |
| US Mainstream Rock (Billboard) | 20 |
| US Cash Box Top 100 Singles | 5 |

=== Year-end charts ===
| Chart (1989) | Position |
|---|---|
| US Billboard Hot 100 | 82 |
| US Cash Box Top 100 Singles | 46 |

== Release history ==
| Region | Date | Format(s) | Label(s) | Ref. |
|---|---|---|---|---|
| United States | May 1989 | 7-inch vinyl; 12-inch vinyl; cassette | Mercury | |
| United Kingdom | August 7, 1989 | 7-inch vinyl; 10-inch vinyl | Vertigo | |
| United Kingdom | August 14, 1989 | CD | Vertigo | |
| United Kingdom | August 28, 1989 | Blue 7-inch vinyl | Vertigo | |
| Japan | September 5, 1989 | CD | Mercury | |

== See also ==
- List of glam metal albums and songs
