= Keep the Faith (Bon Jovi song) =

1992 single by Bon Jovi

Single by Bon Jovi

from the album Keep the Faith
- Released: October 7, 1992
- Genre: Pop metal
- Length: 5:46 (album version); 4:31 (edited version)
- Label: Mercury; Jambco
- Songwriters: Jon Bon Jovi; Richie Sambora; Desmond Child
- Producer: Bob Rock

Bon Jovi singles chronology
"Living in Sin" (1989)	"Keep the Faith" (1992)	"Bed of Roses" (1993)

Music video
- Keep the Faith at YouTube.com

"Keep the Faith" is a song by American rock band Bon Jovi. It was written by Jon Bon Jovi, Richie Sambora, and Desmond Child. It was released on October 7, 1992, by Jambco and Mercury Records as the lead single from Bon Jovi's fifth album, Keep the Faith (1992). It is characterized by its driving bass line and is a live staple for the band. "I Wish Everyday Could Be Like Christmas" appeared as a B-side to the song in the United States. In the US, the song reached number one on the Billboard Album Rock Tracks chart and peaked at number 29 on the Billboard Hot 100. Worldwide, "Keep the Faith" topped the charts of Norway and Portugal and reached number five in the United Kingdom.

It is a regular song at live shows by the band and is featured on the Live from London and The Crush Tour DVDs. When played live it features Jon Bon Jovi playing percussion. In 2009, Jon Bon Jovi released a new version of "Keep the Faith" with the Washington DC Youth Choir on the compilation album Oh Happy Day. German Eurodance band X-Perience has also covered "Keep the Faith" in their 1997 album Take Me Home.

== Music video ==
The music video for the song was directed by Phil Joanou and shot both in black and white and color. It combines scenes with whole band playing live on the stage and band members in New York City. Scenes in New York are mainly featuring Jon Bon Jovi and Richie Sambora appearing in various parts of the city, but the whole band we can see only in the beginning and the end of the video. We can see Jon sitting on the stairway of a house, walking down the Brooklyn Bridge being followed by group of teenagers, and driving in the bus. Sambora is also seen playing the guitar on the Brooklyn Bridge and on Wall Street. One scene features both Bon Jovi and Sambora on a stairway.

== Releases ==
European CD single
No.	Title	Writer(s)	Length
1.	"Keep the Faith" (Edited version)	Bon Jovi, Sambora, Child	4:31
2.	"Keep the Faith" (Album Version)	Bon Jovi, Sambora, Child	5:46
3.	"I Wish Everyday Could Be Like Christmas"	Bon Jovi	4:26
4.	"Little Bit of Soul"	Bon Jovi, Sambora	5:44
Total length:			20:28

UK CD single
No.	Title	Writer(s)	Length
1.	"Keep the Faith" (Album Version)	Bon Jovi, Sambora, Child	5:46
2.	"I Wish Everyday Could Be Like Christmas"	Bon Jovi	4:26
3.	"Living in Sin" (Recorded live at Lakeland, Florida on September 23, 1989.)	Bon Jovi	6:15
Total length:			16:31

UK CD single
No.	Title	Writer(s)	Length
1.	"Keep the Faith" (Album Version)	Bon Jovi, Sambora, Child	5:46
2.	"I Wish Everyday Could Be Like Christmas"	Bon Jovi	4:26
3.	"Little Bit of Soul"	Bon Jovi, Sambora	5:43
Total length:			15:59

== Charts ==
=== Weekly charts ===
1992–1993 weekly chart performance for "Keep the Faith"
Chart (1992–1993)	Peak position
Australia (ARIA)	10
Austria (Ö3 Austria Top 40)	17
Belgium (Ultratop 50 Flanders)	14
Canada Top Singles (RPM)	5
Europe (Eurochart Hot 100)	6
Europe (European Hit Radio)	3
Germany (GfK)	8
Greece (IFPI)	2
Iceland (Íslenski Listinn Topp 40)	9
Ireland (IRMA)	5
Japan (Oricon)	42
Netherlands (Dutch Top 40)	10
Netherlands (Single Top 100)	9
New Zealand (Recorded Music NZ)	4
Norway (VG-lista)	1
Portugal (AFP)	1
Sweden (Sverigetopplistan)	7
Switzerland (Schweizer Hitparade)	3
UK Singles (Official Charts)	5
UK Airplay (Music Week)	4
US Billboard Hot 100	29
US Mainstream Rock (Billboard)	1
US Pop Airplay (Billboard)	23
US Cash Box Top 100	21

2018 weekly chart performance for "Keep the Faith"
Chart (2018)	Peak position
Slovenia (SloTop50)	24

=== Year-end charts ===
1992 year-end chart performance for "Keep the Faith"
Chart (1992)	Position
Australia (ARIA)	62
Europe (Eurochart Hot 100)	95
Germany (Media Control)	98
Netherlands (Dutch Top 40)	72
Sweden (Topplistan)	35
UK Singles (OCC)	92
UK Airplay (Music Week)	64

1993 year-end chart performance for "Keep the Faith"
Chart (1993)	Position
Canada Top Singles (RPM)	83
Iceland (Íslenski Listinn Topp 40)	93
Germany (Media Control)	54

== Certifications ==
Certifications for "Keep the Faith"
Region	Certification	Certified units/sales
Australia (ARIA)	Platinum	70,000^{‡}
United Kingdom (BPI)	Silver	200,000^{‡}
^{‡} Sales+streaming figures based on certification alone.

== Release history ==
Release dates and formats for "Keep the Faith"
Region	Date	Format(s)	Label(s)	Ref.
Japan	October 7, 1992	Mini-CD	Mercury; Jambco	
United Kingdom	October 12, 1992	7-inch vinyl; CD; cassette	Mercury; Jambco	
