= New Jersey (album) =

Studio album by Bon Jovi
- Released: September 19, 1988
- Recorded: May 1 – July 31, 1988
- Studios: Little Mountain (Vancouver, Canada)
- Genres: Glam metal; hard rock; arena rock; pop rock
- Length: 57:30
- Label: Mercury (North America) Vertigo (worldwide)
- Producer: Bruce Fairbairn

Bon Jovi chronology
| Slippery When Wet (1986) | New Jersey (1988) | Hard & Hot (Best of Bon Jovi) (1991) |

Singles from New Jersey
- 1. "Bad Medicine" Released: September 12, 1988; 2. "Born to Be My Baby" Released: November 1988; 3. "I'll Be There for You" Released: February 1989; 4. "Lay Your Hands on Me" Released: May 1989; 5. "Living in Sin" Released: September 1989

New Jersey is the fourth studio album by American rock band Bon Jovi, released on September 19, 1988, by Mercury Records. The album was produced by Bruce Fairbairn and recorded at Little Mountain Sound Studios in Vancouver, British Columbia, Canada. The album was the follow-up to the band's third album, Slippery When Wet, and reached number one on the Billboard 200 chart in its second week of release after debuting at number eight. It remained at the top for four consecutive weeks. The album was named after the band's home state of New Jersey.

It produced five Billboard Hot 100 top ten hits, the most top ten hits to date for any hard rock album, including "Bad Medicine" and "I'll Be There for You", which both reached number one. In 1996, eight years after release, the album was certified 7× platinum by the Recording Industry Association of America (RIAA). The album debuted at number one in the UK, a first for the band. New Jersey was released by the Soviet state-owned record label Melodiya, being the first American album to be officially released in the USSR. To celebrate the band's 30th anniversary in 2014, the album was repackaged with bonus tracks.

== Background ==
The album was recorded very shortly after the Slippery When Wet Tour, because the band wanted to prove that they were not just going to be a one hit wonder. The album was initially planned to be a double album; however, this idea was rejected by the record label because they were skeptical about the higher price point and decided they would only release a single album. One working title for the album was Sons of Beaches, which alluded to the title of Slippery When Wet.

== Recording and production ==
The album was produced by Bruce Fairbairn like its predecessor and recorded at Little Mountain Sound Studios in Vancouver, British Columbia, Canada. It marked the final collaboration between Bon Jovi and producer Bruce Fairbairn.

When the Slippery When Wet Tour ended in October 1987, the band were inactive for about three to four weeks. Then Jon Bon Jovi and Richie Sambora began making demos for 17 songs which would make up the first batch of songs written for the album. However, they began to feel a high level of pressure because they did not feel as though they had "the amazing song". Jon Bon Jovi said that "I really wanted to do it again, not for monetary reasons—I have plenty of money—but it was such an amazing feeling to have done what we've done. There was a real fear of not being able to write 'You Give Love a Bad Name' again." Jon Bon Jovi and Richie Sambora sat together and wrote the song "Love Is War" but Jon Bon Jovi wanted to write a song that would prove to be just as successful as "You Give Love a Bad Name" so desperately that it came out with exactly the same chord progression. They later started on the second batch of songs and they wrote "Bad Medicine" and "Born to Be My Baby" with Desmond Child. "Born to Be My Baby" was originally recorded acoustically, however the producer Bruce Fairbairn persuaded them to re-record it with electric instruments in a much more metal style. Jon Bon Jovi has since said that he believed the song would have made number one on the charts if it had been released in its original form. This song has a similar theme to "Livin' on a Prayer", as it is about a young working class couple struggling to make ends meet.

Although the glossy production and anthems from Slippery When Wet remained, the band wished to show a level of diversity on the album. The album is much more experimental with a long, atmosphere-building intro on "Lay Your Hands on Me", harmonica and organ duels on "Homebound Train" and a flamenco guitar intro on "Wild Is the Wind". "Ride Cowboy Ride" is a short song functioning as an introduction to "Stick to Your Guns" and was recorded in mono. The song is credited to "Captain Kidd and King of Swing", the nicknames of Bon Jovi and Sambora.

"Love for Sale" was recorded and engineered by John P. Allen and Chris Cavallaro at Chalet Sound in Allenwood, New Jersey. All pre-production songs were recorded and engineered at Chalet Sound by Allen additional engineering by Cavallaro and Nejat Bekan.

== Release and reception ==
Professional ratings
Review scores
| Source | Rating |
|---|---|
| AllMusic | 4.5/5 stars |
| Kerrang! | 3.75/5 stars |
| Number One | 1/5 stars |
| Rolling Stone | 3/5 stars |
| The Rolling Stone Album Guide | 2/5 stars |
| The Village Voice | C+ |

New Jersey debuted at No. 8 on the Billboard 200 chart, but climbed to No. 1 the following week and spent four weeks at the top spot. It eventually sold 7 million copies in the United States. The album debuted at No. 1 in Canada, the United Kingdom, Switzerland, Sweden, New Zealand and Australia. "Bad Medicine" and the ballad "I'll Be There for You" both hit No. 1 on the Billboard Hot 100. "Born to Be My Baby", "Lay Your Hands on Me", and "Living in Sin" reached the Top 10.

New Jersey was released on July 1, 2014, as a 2CD "Deluxe Edition", which included the original album remastered along with B-sides and previously unreleased demos from the New Jersey/Sons of Beaches sessions. The "Super Deluxe Edition" includes both discs plus a DVD containing the documentary Access All Areas: A Rock & Roll Odyssey and New Jersey: The Videos. Both titles were previously available on VHS.

== Track listing ==
All tracks are written by Jon Bon Jovi and Richie Sambora, except where noted.

Side one
| No. | Title | Writer(s) | Length |
|---|---|---|---|
| 1. | "Lay Your Hands on Me" | | 5:58 |
| 2. | "Bad Medicine" | Bon Jovi; Sambora; Desmond Child | 5:16 |
| 3. | "Born to Be My Baby" | Bon Jovi; Sambora; Child | 4:40 |
| 4. | "Living in Sin" | Bon Jovi | 4:39 |
| 5. | "Blood on Blood" | Bon Jovi; Sambora; Child | 6:16 |

Side two
| No. | Title | Writer(s) | Length |
|---|---|---|---|
| 1. | "Homebound Train" | | 5:10 |
| 2. | "Wild Is the Wind" | Bon Jovi; Sambora; Child; Diane Warren | 5:08 |
| 3. | "Ride Cowboy Ride" | | 1:25 |
| 4. | "Stick to Your Guns" | Bon Jovi; Sambora; Holly Knight | 4:45 |
| 5. | "I'll Be There for You" | | 5:46 |
| 6. | "99 in the Shade" | | 4:29 |
| 7. | "Love for Sale" | | 3:58 |
| Total length: | | | 57:30 |

Japan release bonus track
| No. | Title | Writer(s) | Length |
|---|---|---|---|
| 13. | "You Give Love a Bad Name" (Live Version) | Bon Jovi; Sambora; Child | 3:53 |
| Total length: | | | 61:23 |

1998 2-CD Special Edition bonus CD PHCR-90017~8
| No. | Title | Writer(s) | Length |
|---|---|---|---|
| 1. | "Bad Medicine" (Live at Wembley Arena, 1988) | Bon Jovi; Sambora; Child | 5:53 |
| 2. | "Bad Medicine" (Live on the Keep the Faith Tour) | Bon Jovi; Sambora; Child | 8:22 |
| 3. | "Blood on Blood" (Live at Wembley Arena, 1988) | Bon Jovi; Sambora; Child | 6:50 |
| 4. | "Born to Be My Baby" (Acoustic version) | Bon Jovi; Sambora; Child | 4:54 |
| 5. | "I'll Be There for You" (Live at Lakeland 1989) | | 6:33 |
| 6. | "Lay Your Hands on Me" (Live at Giants Stadium, 1989) | | 5:35 |
| 7. | "Love Is War" (Studio outtake) | | 4:15 |

2010 Special Edition bonus tracks
| No. | Title | Writer(s) | Length |
|---|---|---|---|
| 13. | "Blood on Blood" (Live Version) | Bon Jovi; Sambora; Child | 12:04 |
| 14. | "Born to Be My Baby" (Live Version) | Bon Jovi; Sambora; Child | 5:47 |
| Total length: | | | 75:21 |

=== 2014 deluxe edition ===
Disc 1: Original "New Jersey" Album Remastered bonus tracks
| No. | Title | Writer(s) | Length |
|---|---|---|---|
| 13. | "The Boys Are Back in Town (Note: Previously released on Stairway to Heaven/Highway to Hell compilation. Released in the UK as a 12” single B-side.)" (Thin Lizzy cover) | Phil Lynott | 4:05 |
| 14. | "Love Is War" (B-side from "Living in Sin" single) | | 4:14 |
| 15. | "Born to Be My Baby" (Acoustic version) | Bon Jovi; Sambora; Child | 4:53 |
| Total length: | | | 70:42 |

Disc 2: The "Sons of Beaches" Demos
| No. | Title | Writer(s) | Length |
|---|---|---|---|
| 1. | "Homebound Train" | | 6:32 |
| 2. | "Judgement Day" | | 4:18 |
| 3. | "Full Moon High" | | 4:42 |
| 4. | "Growin' Up the Hard Way" | | 5:31 |
| 5. | "Let's Make It Baby" | Bon Jovi; Sambora; Child | 5:56 |
| 6. | "Love Hurts" | | 4:49 |
| 7. | "Backdoor to Heaven" | | 5:51 |
| 8. | "Now and Forever" | | 5:34 |
| 9. | "Wild Is the Wind" | Bon Jovi; Sambora; Child; Warren | 4:55 |
| 10. | "Stick to Your Guns" | Bon Jovi; Sambora; Child; Knight | 5:15 |
| 11. | "House of Fire (Note: Demo of the song from Alice Cooper's 1989 album Trash.)" | Alice Cooper; Child; Joan Jett | 5:01 |
| 12. | "Does Anybody Really Fall in Love Anymore? (Note: This song was later recorded by Cher on her album Heart of Stone and by Kane Roberts for his album Saints and Sinners.)" | Bon Jovi; Sambora; Child; Warren | 4:57 |
| 13. | "Diamond Ring (Note: This song was later recorded for These Days.)" | Bon Jovi; Sambora; Child | 4:10 |
| Total length: | | | 67:31 |

== Personnel ==
Bon Jovi

- Jon Bon Jovi – lead and backing vocals, harmonica, acoustic guitar,
- Richie Sambora – electric and acoustic guitars, mandolin, backing vocals
- David Bryan – keyboards, backing vocals
- Alec John Such – bass, backing vocals
- Tico "The Hit Man" Torres – drums, percussion

Additional musicians

- Scott Fairbairn – cello
- Audrey Nordwell – cello
- Bruce Fairbairn – additional percussion, horn
- Hugh McDonald – bass (uncredited)

Additional credits

- Bruce Fairbairn – production
- John Allen – engineering
- Peter Berring – arrangement, additional vocals, vocal arrangement
- Chris Cavallaro – engineering
- Bob Rock – engineering, mixing
- George Marino – mastering
- Isabella Lento, Carmela Lento – photography, unknown association
- Hugh Syme – artwork, design
- Chris Taylor – engineering assistance
- Jim Williams – engineering assistance
- Tim White – photography
- Cameron Wong – cover photography

== Charts ==
=== Weekly charts ===
| Chart (1988–1989) | Peak position |
|---|---|
| Australian Albums (ARIA) | 1 |
| Austrian Albums (Ö3 Austria) | 5 |
| Canada Top Albums/CDs (RPM) | 3 |
| Dutch Albums (Album Top 100) | 36 |
| Finnish Albums (The Official Finnish Charts) | 2 |
| German Albums (Offizielle Top 100) | 4 |
| Italian Albums (Musica e Dischi) | 10 |
| Japanese Albums (Oricon) | 2 |
| New Zealand Albums (RMNZ) | 1 |
| Norwegian Albums (VG-lista) | 4 |
| Spanish Albums (AFYVE) | 21 |
| Swedish Albums (Sverigetopplistan) | 1 |
| Swiss Albums (Schweizer Hitparade) | 1 |
| UK Albums (Official Charts) | 1 |
| US Billboard 200 | 1 |

| Chart (1995–1997) | Peak position |
|---|---|
| UK Rock & Metal Albums (Official Charts) | 8 |

| Chart (2014) | Peak position |
|---|---|
| Belgian Albums (Ultratop Flanders) | 128 |
| Belgian Albums (Ultratop Wallonia) | 150 |
| Finnish Albums (Suomen virallinen lista) | 36 |
| Scottish Albums (Official Charts) | 44 |

=== Year-end charts ===
| Chart (1988) | Position |
|---|---|
| European Albums (European Top 100 Albums) | 52 |
| Swiss Albums (Schweizer Hitparade) | 27 |

| Chart (1989) | Position |
|---|---|
| Canada Top Albums/CDs (RPM) | 36 |
| German Albums (Offizielle Top 100) | 67 |
| Japanese Albums (Oricon) | 94 |
| US Billboard 200 | 4 |

== Certifications and sales ==
| Region | Certification | Certified units/sales |
|---|---|---|
| Australia (ARIA) | 2× Platinum | 165,000 |
| Austria (IFPI Austria) | Platinum | 50,000^{*} |
| Canada (Music Canada) | 5× Platinum | 500,000^{^} |
| Finland (Musiikkituottajat) | Platinum | 51,126 |
| Germany (BVMI) | Platinum | 500,000^{^} |
| Ireland (IRMA) | Gold | 7,500^{^} |
| Italy (FIMI) | Gold | 100,000 |
| Japan (RIAJ) | Gold | 332,000 |
| Mexico (AMPROFON) | Gold | 100,000^{^} |
| New Zealand (RMNZ) | Platinum | 15,000^{^} |
| Norway (IFPI Norway) | Gold | 50,000 |
| Spain (Promusicae) | Platinum | 100,000^{^} |
| Sweden (GLF) | Gold | 50,000^{^} |
| Switzerland (IFPI Switzerland) 1989 certification | Platinum | 50,000^{^} |
| Switzerland (IFPI Switzerland) 1998 certification | Gold | 25,000^{^} |
| United Kingdom (BPI) | 2× Platinum | 600,000^{^} |
| United States (RIAA) | 7× Platinum | 7,000,000^{^} |
^{*} Sales figures based on certification alone.^{^} Shipments figures based on certification alone.

== See also ==
- List of glam metal albums and songs
