= Born to Be My Baby =

1988 single by Bon Jovi

Single by Bon Jovi

from the album New Jersey
- B-side: "Love for Sale"
- Released: November 1988
- Genre: Glam metal; pop metal; rock
- Length: 4:40
- Label: Mercury
- Songwriters: Jon Bon Jovi; Richie Sambora; Desmond Child
- Producer: Bruce Fairbairn

Bon Jovi singles chronology
"Bad Medicine" (1988)	"Born to Be My Baby" (1988)	"I'll Be There For You" (1989)

Music video
- "Born to Be My Baby" at YouTube.com

"Born to Be My Baby" is a song by American rock band Bon Jovi. Written by Jon Bon Jovi, Richie Sambora, and Desmond Child, it was released in November 1988 as the second single from their fourth studio album, New Jersey. The song peaked at number two on the US Cash Box Top 100, number three on the US Billboard Hot 100, and number seven on the Billboard Album Rock Tracks chart. Worldwide, the single reached the top 20 in Canada, Ireland, and New Zealand.

Despite the song's success, "Born to Be My Baby" was not included on the 1994 Cross Road greatest hits album. However, it was included on Bon Jovi's Greatest Hits album in 2010. In addition, an acoustic version of the song was recorded for their album This Left Feels Right.

== Critical reception ==
Cash Box considered the song to be Jon Bon Jovi paying respect to Bruce Springsteen.

== Music video ==
The video for the song was done in all black-and-white, like many of the band's videos from the New Jersey album. A very low budget video, it was shot all in the studio, chronicling the recording process for "Born to Be My Baby". In the full length video, there is actually a dialogue between the band members, and the band does the chorus again, unsatisfied with the original version.

The video prominently features photogenic shots of Jon Bon Jovi singing, as well as the band gathering around a microphone to sing the "na-na-na-na-na" part. The video also features Jon Bon Jovi's wife, Dorothea. The ending of the video depicts Bon Jovi cheering and hugging each other. This was the moment that the band learned New Jersey was the No. 1 album in the U.S.

The video was included on New Jersey: The Videos, a promotional VHS that is no longer manufactured. The video was absent from the video collection Cross Road: The Videos. It was later featured on Bon Jovi's 2010 release Greatest Hits - The Ultimate Video Collection.

== Charts ==
=== Weekly charts ===
Chart (1988–1989)	Peak position
Australia (ARIA)	30
Canada Top Singles (RPM)	8
Ireland (IRMA)	7
New Zealand (Recorded Music NZ)	19
Switzerland (Schweizer Hitparade)	25
UK Singles (Official Charts)	22
US Billboard Hot 100	3
US Mainstream Rock (Billboard)	7
US Cash Box Top 100 Singles	2
West Germany (GfK)	54

=== Year-end charts ===
Chart (1989)	Position
Canada Top Singles (RPM)	83
US Billboard Hot 100	39
US Cash Box Top 100 Singles	22

== Certifications ==
Region	Certification	Certified units/sales
Australia (ARIA)	Gold	35,000^{‡}
^{‡} Sales+streaming figures based on certification alone.

== Release history ==
Region	Date	Format(s)	Label(s)	Ref.
United States	November 1988	7-inch vinyl; mini-CD; cassette	Mercury	
Japan	December 21, 1988	Mini-CD	Mercury	
Japan	February 25, 1989	Mini-album	Mercury	
