= Bad Medicine (song) =

1988 single by Bon Jovi

Single by Bon Jovi

from the album New Jersey
- B-side: "99 in the Shade"
- Released: September 12, 1988
- Genre: Glam metal
- Length: 5:16 (album version); 3:54 (single version)
- Label: Mercury
- Songwriters: Jon Bon Jovi; Richie Sambora; Desmond Child
- Producer: Bruce Fairbairn

Bon Jovi singles chronology
"Never Say Goodbye" (1987)	"Bad Medicine" (1988)	"Born to Be My Baby" (1988)

Music video
- "Bad Medicine" on YouTube

"Bad Medicine" is a song by American rock band Bon Jovi. It was written by Jon Bon Jovi, Richie Sambora, and Desmond Child, and was released on September 12, 1988, by Mercury Records as the lead single from the band's fourth album, New Jersey (1988). The song, produced by Bruce Fairbairn, reached number one on the US Billboard Hot 100, Bon Jovi's third single to do so, and became a top-10 hit in Australia, Canada, Finland, Ireland, the Netherlands, and New Zealand. Two different music videos were released to accompany the song.

== Critical reception ==
Cash Box magazine said that "producer Bruce Fairbairn and Jon Bon Jovi fashion gang harmonies around a typically monumental guitar sound." Jonh Wilde from Melody Maker described the song as "hard rocking stuff". He added, "Most of you are more concerned with the singer's crotch I'm sure. It grinds like hard rocking records have grinded since way back".

== Music video ==
There are two videos for the song, one with the band live in concert, and a more well-known live video which begins with a crowd of young people waiting in line to get into the video shoot. Before they are let in, one of the security guards asks if there are any questions, and Sam Kinison asks if the video will "be the same of video slop that we get from these glam rock pretty boys". When he answers "yes", Kinison rallies the crowd to hijack the cameras and "make a better Bon Jovi video than these guys can." The members of the crowd are given hand-held cameras and invited onstage to help shoot the video. In an alternate cut of this video, Kinison has photos of various celebrities with their mouths cut for him to impersonate them while promoting the band.

== Charts ==
=== Weekly charts ===
Chart (1988–1989)	Peak position
Australia (ARIA)	4
Belgium (Ultratop 50 Flanders)	31
Canada Top Singles (RPM)	5
Europe (Eurochart Hot 100)	50
Finland (Suomen virallinen lista)	7
Ireland (IRMA)	10
Italy Airplay (Music & Media)	3
Netherlands (Dutch Top 40)	10
Netherlands (Single Top 100)	10
New Zealand (Recorded Music NZ)	2
South Africa (Springbok Radio)	23
Sweden (Sverigetopplistan)	20
Switzerland (Schweizer Hitparade)	14
UK Singles (Official Charts)	17
US Billboard Hot 100	1
US Mainstream Rock Airplay (Billboard)	3
US Cash Box Top 100	1
West Germany (GfK)	54

=== Year-end charts ===
Chart (1988)	Position
Canada Top Singles (RPM)	67
New Zealand (RIANZ)	35
US Billboard Hot 100	41

== Certifications ==
Region	Certification	Certified units/sales
Australia (ARIA)	Platinum	70,000^{‡}
New Zealand (RMNZ)	Gold	15,000^{‡}
United Kingdom (BPI)	Silver	200,000^{‡}
^{‡} Sales+streaming figures based on certification alone.

== Release history ==
Region	Date	Format(s)	Label(s)	Ref.
United Kingdom	September 12, 1988	7-inch vinyl; 12-inch vinyl; CD	Vertigo	
United States	September 14, 1988	7-inch vinyl; mini-CD; cassette	Mercury	
Japan	October 10, 1988	Mini-CD	Mercury	
Japan	February 25, 1989	Mini-album	Mercury	

== See also ==
- Bon Jovi discography
- List of Billboard Hot 100 number-one singles of 1988
- List of glam metal albums and songs
