= I'll Be There for You (Bon Jovi song) =

1989 single by Bon Jovi

Single by Bon Jovi

from the album New Jersey
- B-side: "Homebound Train"
- Released: February 1989
- Genre: Glam metal; arena rock; hard rock
- Length: 5:46 (album version); 5:41 (single version); 4:43 (radio edit)
- Label: Mercury
- Songwriters: Jon Bon Jovi; Richie Sambora
- Producer: Bruce Fairbairn

Bon Jovi singles chronology
"Born to Be My Baby" (1988)	"I'll Be There for You" (1989)	"Lay Your Hands on Me" (1989)

Music video
- I'll Be There for You on YouTube

"I'll Be There for You" is a song by American rock band Bon Jovi, released as the third single from their 1988 album, New Jersey. The power ballad was written by Jon Bon Jovi and Richie Sambora. The single reached number one on the US Billboard Hot 100 and number five on the Billboard Album Rock Tracks chart.

== Background ==
Originally released on the 1988 album New Jersey, "I'll Be There for You" is a glam metal and arena rock power ballad. It became Bon Jovi's third single from the album when it was released in 1989. As the band (and glam metal) was at its peak popularity at this time, the song quickly climbed to the number one position on both the Cash Box Top 100 and Billboard Hot 100, becoming their fourth number-one single. Cash Box ranked it as the number-two pop single of 1989.

== Music video ==
The video for the song (directed by Wayne Isham) features the band performing on a dark stage with an almost monochromatic blue color due to the stage lighting, with close-ups of each member, most notably lead singer Jon Bon Jovi and lead guitarist Richie Sambora. However, it is persistent throughout the clip that Richie Sambora's face is constantly in shadow through the entire video. The video footage then switches midway to black-and-white footage from a Bon Jovi concert at the old Wembley Arena in London, England.

== "Homebound Train" ==
"Homebound Train", the B-side to "I'll Be There for You", is notable for being one of the band's heaviest songs, and also for the brief back-and-forth keyboard and harmonica solos leading up to the guitar solo. When played during The Circle Tour, it was sung by lead guitarist Richie Sambora.

== Charts ==
=== Weekly charts ===
Chart (1989–1990)	Peak position
Australia (ARIA)	23
Belgium (Ultratop 50 Flanders)	29
Canada Top Singles (RPM)	2
Europe (Eurochart Hot 100)	48
France (SNEP)	68
Ireland (IRMA)	6
Netherlands (Dutch Top 40)	21
Netherlands (Single Top 100)	22
New Zealand (Recorded Music NZ)	16
Switzerland (Schweizer Hitparade)	15
UK Singles (Official Charts)	18
US Billboard Hot 100	1
US Mainstream Rock Airplay (Billboard)	5
US Cash Box Top 100	1
West Germany (GfK)	67

=== Year-end charts ===
Chart (1989)	Position
Canada Top Singles (RPM)	45
US Billboard Hot 100	23
US Album Rock Tracks (Billboard)	45
US Cash Box Top 100	2

== Certifications ==
Region	Certification	Certified units/sales
Australia (ARIA)	Platinum	70,000^{‡}
Brazil (Pro-Música Brasil)	Gold	30,000^{‡}
United Kingdom (BPI)	Silver	200,000^{‡}
^{‡} Sales+streaming figures based on certification alone.

== Release history ==
Region	Date	Format(s)	Label(s)	Ref.
United States	February 1989	7-inch vinyl; mini-CD; cassette	Mercury	
United Kingdom	April 17, 1989	7-inch vinyl; 12-inch vinyl; CD	Vertigo	
Japan	April 25, 1989	Mini-CD	Mercury	

== See also ==
- List of glam metal albums and songs
