= Because We Can (tour) =

2013 concert tour by Bon Jovi

- Tour by Bon Jovi
- Promotional advertisement for tour
- Associated album: What About Now
- Start date: February 10, 2013
- End date: December 17, 2013
- Legs: 7
- No. of shows: 61 in North America; 25 in Europe; 7 in Oceania; 5 in South America; 2 in Africa; 2 in Asia; 102 in total
- Box office: US $269.5 million ($358.67 million in 2025 dollars)

Bon Jovi concert chronology
- Bon Jovi Live (2011); Because We Can: The Tour (2013); Bon Jovi Live! (2015)

Because We Can was a concert tour by American rock band, Bon Jovi. The tour was in support of the band's twelfth studio album What About Now. The tour was named after the lead single from What About Now. All five major continents were visited during the 2013 tour. The tour saw the band travel to Wales for the first time in 12 years since their 2001 One Wild Night Tour and was also the first time in 18 years since their 1995 These Days Tour that the band returned to Africa for two dates in South Africa. Furthermore, the tour also saw the band travel to Cologne performing in the Müngersdorfer Stadion also for the first time in 12 years since their 2001 tour, this tour was the first time in the band's 30-year history that they visited Bulgaria and Poland. The tour ranked 1st on Pollstar's annual "Top 100 Mid Year Worldwide Tours". It earned $142.1 million from 60 shows. At the end of 2013, the tour placed 1st on Pollstar's "Top 100 Worldwide Tours", grossing $259.5 million from 102 shows.

This is the band's last tour to feature guitarist Richie Sambora, as he left the band during the initial leg and first show in Canada in March, informing the band via management just hours before the show took place. He would not return for the remainder of the dates.

The J. Geils Band played opening act for some shows in the summer dates.

== Setlist ==
1. "That's What the Water Made Me"
2. "You Give Love a Bad Name"
3. "Raise Your Hands"
4. "Born to Be My Baby"
5. "Lost Highway"
6. "Whole Lot of Leavin'"
7. "It's My Life"
8. "Because We Can"
9. "What About Now"
10. "We Got It Going On"
11. "Keep the Faith"
12. "Amen"
13. "Bed of Roses"
14. "Captain Crash & The Beauty Queen From Mars"
15. "We Weren't Born to Follow"
16. "Who Says You Can't Go Home"
17. "I'll Sleep When I'm Dead" (with snippets of "Start Me Up" and "Jumpin' Jack Flash")
18. "Bad Medicine" (with snippets of "Shout" and "Old Time Rock and Roll")

Encore

19. "Runaway"
20. "Wanted Dead or Alive"
21. "Have a Nice Day"
22. "Livin' on a Prayer"

Encore 2

23. "Always"

Encore 3

24. "These Days"

== Opening acts ==
- The J. Geils Band (July 12–20, 25–27)
- Kid Rock (in Australia except December 15)

== Tour dates ==
List of concerts, showing date, city, country, venue, tickets sold, number of available tickets and amount of gross revenue
Date	City	Country	Venue	Attendance	Revenue
North America
February 10, 2013	Washington, D.C.	United States	Verizon Center	16,876 / 16,876	$2,096,190
February 13, 2013	Montreal	Canada	Bell Centre	35,917 / 35,917	$4,048,253
February 14, 2013	Montreal	Canada	Bell Centre	35,917 / 35,917	$4,048,253
February 17, 2013	Toronto	Canada	Air Canada Centre	36,497 / 36,497	$4,004,040
February 18, 2013	Toronto	Canada	Air Canada Centre	36,497 / 36,497	$4,004,040
February 20, 2013	Ottawa	Canada	Canadian Tire Centre	15,533 / 15,533	$1,331,394
February 21, 2013	Pittsburgh	United States	Consol Energy Center	16,369 / 16,369	$1,600,731
February 23, 2013	University Park	United States	Bryce Jordan Center	11,811 / 11,811	$929,424
February 24, 2013	Buffalo	United States	First Niagara Center	16,754 / 16,754	$1,367,933
February 27, 2013	Atlanta	United States	Philips Arena	14,306 / 14,306	$1,579,947
March 1, 2013	Tampa	United States	Amalie Arena	17,034 / 17,034	$1,772,346
March 2, 2013	Sunrise	United States	BB&T Center	17,629 / 17,629	$1,797,352
March 5, 2013	Charlotte	United States	Time Warner Cable Arena	16,122 / 16,122	$1,432,775
March 6, 2013	Nashville	United States	Bridgestone Arena	14,149 / 14,149	$1,336,154
March 9, 2013	Cleveland	United States	Quicken Loans Arena	19,050 / 19,050	$1,725,305
March 10, 2013	Columbus	United States	Nationwide Arena	16,880 / 16,880	$1,508,860
March 13, 2013	St. Louis	United States	Scottrade Center	16,120 / 16,120	$1,262,376
March 14, 2013	Louisville	United States	KFC Yum! Center	17,881 / 17,881	$1,485,170
March 16, 2013	Oklahoma City	United States	Chesapeake Energy Arena	14,160 / 14,160	$1,172,534
March 17, 2013	Lubbock	United States	United Spirit Arena	13,255 / 13,255	$1,201,105
North America
April 2, 2013	Calgary	Canada	Scotiabank Saddledome	15,464 / 15,464	$1,888,961
April 3, 2013	Edmonton	Canada	Rexall Place	15,739 / 15,739	$1,797,778
April 5, 2013	Winnipeg	Canada	MTS Centre	14,550 / 14,550	$1,649,710
April 7, 2013	Saint Paul	United States	Xcel Energy Center	17,034 / 17,034	$1,996,645
April 8, 2013	Omaha	United States	CenturyLink Center Omaha	14,036 / 14,036	$856,051
April 10, 2013	Austin	United States	Frank Erwin Center	15,649 / 15,649	$1,378,590
April 11, 2013	Dallas	United States	American Airlines Center	16,140 / 16,140	$1,891,752
April 13, 2013	Kansas City	United States	Sprint Center	16,390 / 16,390	$1,455,693
April 14, 2013	Des Moines	United States	Wells Fargo Arena	13,629 / 13,629	$1,151,079
April 16, 2013	Denver	United States	Pepsi Center	16,052 / 16,052	$1,461,182
April 17, 2013	Salt Lake City	United States	EnergySolutions Arena	16,004 / 16,004	$1,233,763
April 19, 2013	Los Angeles	United States	Staples Center	16,585 / 16,585	$2,203,669
April 20, 2013	Las Vegas	United States	MGM Grand Garden Arena	13,782 / 13,782	$2,816,950
April 23, 2013	Glendale	United States	Jobing.com Arena	13,951 / 13,951	$1,339,701
April 25, 2013	San Jose	United States	HP Pavilion	16,631 / 16,631	$1,570,930
Africa / Europe
May 7, 2013	Cape Town	South Africa	Cape Town Stadium	35,407 / 35,407	$2,611,492
May 11, 2013	Johannesburg	South Africa	FNB Stadium	65,182 / 65,182	$9,052,059
May 14, 2013	Sofia	Bulgaria	Vasil Levski National Stadium	47,266 / 47,266	$3,378,335
May 17, 2013	Vienna	Austria	Trabrennbahn Krieau	50,513 / 50,513	$4,800,870
May 18, 2013	Munich	Germany	Olympic Stadium	64,284 / 64,284	$5,288,256
May 21, 2013	Oslo	Norway	Telenor Arena	17,657 / 17,657	$2,667,533
May 22, 2013	Bergen	Norway	Koengen	22,024 / 22,024	$3,347,583
May 24, 2013	Stockholm	Sweden	Stockholm Olympic Stadium	31,947 / 31,947	$3,713,393
May 26, 2013	Tampere	Finland	Ratina Stadion	22,595 / 22,595	$3,109,136
June 6, 2013	Copenhagen	Denmark	Parken Stadium	31,078 / 31,078	$3,158,064
June 8, 2013	Manchester	England	Etihad Stadium	41,501 / 41,501	$4,067,566
June 9, 2013	Birmingham	England	Villa Park	35,413 / 35,413	$3,218,037
June 12, 2013	Cardiff	Wales	Cardiff City Stadium	29,171 / 29,171	$2,367,351
June 13, 2013	Sunderland	England	Stadium of Light	41,649 / 41,649	$2,612,563
June 15, 2013	Slane	Ireland	Slane Castle	45,094 / 45,094	$4,616,246
June 16, 2013 (Note: The June 16, 2013 concert in Newport, England at the Seaclose Park was a part of the Isle of Wight Festival.)	Newport	England	Seaclose Park	—N/a	—N/a
June 18, 2013	Berlin	Germany	Waldbühne	22,967 / 22,967	$1,998,785
June 19, 2013	Gdańsk	Poland	PGE Arena Gdańsk	31,167 / 31,167	$3,218,718
June 21, 2013	Stuttgart	Germany	Cannstatter Wasen	26,522 / 26,522	$2,575,716
June 22, 2013	Cologne	Germany	Müngersdorfer Stadion	42,476 / 42,476	$3,572,843
June 24, 2013	Prague	Czechia	Eden Arena	27,386 / 27,386	$2,873,947
June 26, 2013	Lisbon	Portugal	Bela Vista Park	28,864 / 28,864	$2,567,847
June 27, 2013	Madrid	Spain	Vicente Calderón Stadium	43,677 / 43,677	$1,551,294
June 29, 2013	Milan	Italy	Stadio Giuseppe Meazza	51,531 / 51,531	$4,788,512
June 30, 2013	Bern	Switzerland	Stade de Suisse	28,868 / 28,868	$3,477,918
July 3, 2013	Glasgow	Scotland	Hampden Park	34,733 / 34,733	$2,533,766
July 5, 2013 (Note: The July 5, 2013 concert in London, England at the Hyde Park was a part of the British Summer Time festival.)	London	England	Hyde Park	44,013 / 44,013	$4,563,848
North America
July 12, 2013	Chicago	United States	Soldier Field	45,178 / 45,178	$4,690,204
July 18, 2013	Detroit	United States	Ford Field	43,142 / 43,142	$2,638,975
July 20, 2013	Foxborough	United States	Gillette Stadium	45,912 / 45,912	$3,514,571
July 22, 2013	Saratoga Springs	United States	Saratoga Performing Arts Center	14,015 / 14,015	$814,776
July 23, 2013	Darien	United States	Darien Lake Performing Arts Center	11,571 / 11,571	$535,872
July 25, 2013	East Rutherford	United States	MetLife Stadium	95,991 / 95,991	$9,594,635
July 27, 2013	East Rutherford	United States	MetLife Stadium	95,991 / 95,991	$9,594,635
South America / North America
September 20, 2013 (Note: The September 20, 2013 concert in Rio de Janeiro, Brazil at the Parque dos Atletas was a part of Rock in Rio festival.)	Rio de Janeiro	Brazil	Rock in Rio	90,000	
September 22, 2013 (Note: The September 22, 2013 concert in São Paulo, Brazil at the Morumbi Stadium was a part of the Live Music Rocks Concert Series.)	São Paulo	Brazil	Estádio do Morumbi	63,198 / 63,198	$5,695,137
September 24, 2013	Santiago	Chile	Estadio Monumental David Arellano	34,818 / 34,818	$2,302,796
September 26, 2013	Buenos Aires	Argentina	José Amalfitani Stadium	38,130 / 38,130	$4,080,422
September 29, 2013	Mexico City	Mexico	Foro Sol	35,222 / 35,222	$2,464,370
October 2, 2013	Vancouver	Canada	Rogers Arena	16,142 / 16,142	$1,489,300
October 5, 2013	Tacoma	United States	Tacoma Dome	17,357 / 17,357	$1,255,004
October 6, 2013	Spokane	United States	Spokane Veterans Memorial Arena	11,254 / 11,254	$1,434,849
October 8, 2013	Fresno	United States	Save Mart Center	12,463 / 12,463	$1,017,003
October 9, 2013	Anaheim	United States	Honda Center	14,399 / 14,399	$1,157,071
October 11, 2013	Los Angeles	United States	Staples Center	14,257 / 14,257	$1,336,636
October 12, 2013	Las Vegas	United States	MGM Grand Garden Arena	13,425 / 13,425	$1,817,412
October 15, 2013	San Antonio	United States	AT&T Center	13,798 / 13,798	$999,709
October 16, 2013	Dallas	United States	American Airlines Center	13,694 / 13,694	$1,158,010
October 18, 2013	North Little Rock	United States	Verizon Arena	15,422 / 15,422	$1,318,705
October 20, 2013	Lincoln	United States	Pinnacle Bank Arena	13,936 / 13,936	$1,013,624
October 22, 2013	Green Bay	United States	Resch Center	9,178 / 9,178	$1,323,163
October 23, 2013	Chicago	United States	United Center	13,560 / 13,560	$1,146,614
October 25, 2013	Uncasville	United States	Mohegan Sun Arena	9,091 / 9,091	$2,043,338
November 1, 2013	Toronto	Canada	Air Canada Centre	35,859 / 35,859	$3,423,340
November 2, 2013	Toronto	Canada	Air Canada Centre	35,859 / 35,859	$3,423,340
November 5, 2013	Philadelphia	United States	Wells Fargo Center	16,177 / 16,177	$1,448,021
November 6, 2013	Raleigh	United States	PNC Arena	15,899 / 15,899	$1,004,941
November 8, 2013	Montreal	Canada	Bell Centre	18,131 / 18,131	$1,927,699
Japan / Australia
December 3, 2013	Osaka	Japan	Osaka Dome	21,937 / 21,937	$2,467,931
December 4, 2013	Tokyo	Japan	Tokyo Dome	40,000 / 40,000	$4,458,661
December 7, 2013	Melbourne	Australia	Etihad Stadium	91,505 / 91,505	$12,170,951
December 8, 2013	Melbourne	Australia	Etihad Stadium	91,505 / 91,505	$12,170,951
December 11, 2013	Adelaide	Australia	AAMI Stadium	39,368 / 39,368	$4,451,035
December 12, 2013	Perth	Australia	Perth Arena	14,062 / 14,062	$2,975,768
December 14, 2013	Sydney	Australia	ANZ Stadium	60,510 / 60,510	$8,079,581
December 15, 2013	Sydney	Australia	Sydney Entertainment Centre	11,113 / 11,113	$1,408,400
December 17, 2013	Brisbane	Australia	Suncorp Stadium	42,316 / 42,316	$5,869,331

== Cancelled shows ==
List of cancelled concerts, showing date, city, country, venue and reason for cancellation
Date	City	Country	Venue	Reason
July 14, 2013	Cleveland	United States	FirstEnergy Stadium	Unknown
September 18, 2013	Asunción	Paraguay	Jockey Club del Paraguay	Logistical reasons
September 18, 2013	Córdoba	Argentina	Estadio Mario Alberto Kempes	Recuperation time for band member

== Personnel ==
- Jon Bon Jovi – lead vocals, guitar, maracas for Keep the Faith, tambourine for Hey God
- Richie Sambora – lead guitar, backing vocals, talkbox (Last show with the band on March 17)
- David Bryan – keyboards, backing vocals
- Hugh McDonald – bass, backing vocals
- Tico Torres - drums, percussion

Additional musicians

- Bobby Bandiera – rhythm and lead guitar, backing vocals (Last show with the band on December 17)
- Phil X – lead and rhythm guitar, backing vocals, talkbox (substitute for Richie Sambora since April 3)
- Rich Scannella – drums, percussion (substitute for Tico Torres who was awaiting gall bladder surgery from September 20 to October 6)

== See also ==
- List of highest-grossing concert tours
