= We Don't Run =

Bon Jovi song

"We Don’t Run"

Single by Bon Jovi

from the album Burning Bridges
- Released: July 15, 2015
- Genre: Arena rock
- Length: 3:19
- Label: Mercury
- Songwriters: Jon Bon Jovi, John Shanks

Bon Jovi singles chronology
"What About Now" (2013)	"We Don’t Run" (2015)	"Saturday Night Gave Me Sunday Morning" (2015)

"We Don't Run" is a song recorded by American rock band Bon Jovi for their 2015 album Burning Bridges. It was later included as a bonus track on the deluxe versions of their following album, This House Is Not for Sale but with a new guitar solo.

Lead singer Jon Bon Jovi dedicated the song to the people of Israel, saying: "This should be the fight song for Tel Aviv."

== Background and release ==
On July 20, 2015, "We Don't Run" premiered on both the Brazilian radio station "Radio Rock" and on Republic Records' official website via streaming. The song was released simultaneously alongside another single, "Saturday Night Gave Me Sunday Morning", on July 31, 2015.

The song is a reference to the band's strained 32-year relationship with its former record label, Universal. Mercury Records was the label used for the album. It has also been suggested that the song lyrics are a reference to Richie Sambora leaving the band in 2013; Burning Bridges is the first album released since his departure.

"We Don't Run" was included as a bonus track on the special edition versions of the band's following studio album, This House Is Not for Sale.

== Style and composition ==
"We Don't Run" is upbeat and fast-paced, at 156 beats per minute. It is in the key of A♭minor.

The album title, Burning Bridges, came from a section of the song's chorus: "Not afraid of burning bridges/'Cause I know they're gonna light my way."

Jon Bon Jovi described the song as "a battle cry for anyone who feels their back against the wall."

== Performances ==
While performing "We Don't Run" in Israel on October 3, 2015, on the last leg of the Bon Jovi Live! Tour, lead singer Jon Bon Jovi dedicated the song to the people of Israel, calling it "the fight song for Tel Aviv". He re-affirmed the song's dedication to the people of Tel Aviv when he returned to the city on July 25, 2019, during the This House Is Not for Sale Tour.

== Reception ==
'Society of Rock' describes the song as "anthemic" and as having an "overall message of perseverance", while Observer.com called it "snarling and majestic". Billboard described the song as having a "driving drum beat and a chain-gang chorus", and called Shanks' performance in the song a "meaty production and a shredding guitar solo."
