= Matt O'Ree =

American singer-songwriter (born 1972)

- Born: Matthew O'Ree; February 26, 1972 (age 54); Holmdel, New Jersey, United States
- Genres: Blues, rock
- Occupation: Musician
- Instruments: Guitar, vocals
- Years active: 1994–present
- Label: Therewolf records
- Website: mattoree.com

Matt O'Ree (born 26 February 1972) is an American blues-rock guitarist, singer, and songwriter born and raised in Holmdel, New Jersey with his wife, Eryn Shewell-O'Ree. O'Ree is best known as the founder and front man for the Matt O'Ree Band which he formed in 1994. In 2015, Matt joined Bon Jovi as their touring rhythm guitar player next to Phil X. He joined just before the Bon Jovi Live! tour which began on September 11, 2015, in Jakarta, Indonesia at the Gelora Bung Karno Stadium and continued throughout Asia with the final show on October 3, 2015 in Tel Aviv, Israel at Yarkon Park. This tour was in support of Bon Jovi's 2015 album Burning Bridges.

== Early life ==
At a young age, O'Ree was influenced by artists such as Albert King, Howlin' Wolf, Jimi Hendrix and Stevie Ray Vaughan. At age 13, he picked up his first guitar and began learning to play. A couple of years later, at the age of 15, he began to play in various bands. After graduating high school, he went on as a music major in college. During this time, he also worked as an intern at a recording studio and instructed other students on how to play guitar.

== Early career ==
In 1994, O'Ree formed the Matt O'Ree Band. He attributes much of his success to his day job as a music teacher and the connections it made him. In 1997, he began writing and recording material that evolved into his debut album, 88 Miles which was released in 1998. This led to opening shows for national recording artists such as Foreigner, Kansas, The Original Blue Brothers Band, Buddy Guy, Leslie West and Mountain, Blues Traveler, The Outlaws, Marshall Tucker, Gov't Mule, Robin Trower, Blue Öyster Cult, Johnny Winter, Edgar Winter, Dickie Belts, Dick Dale, Gretchen Wilson, The Screamin' Cheetah Wheelies, Bernand Allison, Chris Duarte, Indigenous, Robby Kreiger, Gary Hoey, Walter Trout, Labambas Big Band, and Smokin' Joe Kubek. In 2001, the second album, Chalk It Up, was released. In 2005, O'Ree released his third studio album titled Shelf Life, which was featured in an issue of "Guitar World Magazine". Shelf Life also won four Asbury Park Music Awards for: Best Blues Band, Best Guitarist, Best Local Release, and Best Song of the Year - "Saints & Sinners." On June 8, 2006, O'Ree was named the Grand Prize Winner of the Guitarmageddon: "King of the Blues" guitar contest which was hosted by BB King and John Mayer through Guitar Center and Guitar World Magazine. He won after competing against 4,000 other guitar players. His prizes included multiple guitars and an endorsement from Gibson guitars, shopping sprees with Guitar Center and a car from Scion.

== The Matt O'Ree Band ==
He formed the Matt O'Ree band in 1994 as a three piece band with a line up of guitar, bass, and drums, performing primarily blues based covers and originals. In 2008, the Matt O’Ree Band went from being a three piece band to a four piece band, adding keyboardist Eric Safka to the mix. With the new band line-up, they developed a new sound and a different direction in song writing.

Thereafter, O'Ree and his band began touring nationally and internationally. Many trips which were taken in their homemade tour bus they call "Big Jenna" which has a song written about it called "Big Jenna" on his live album.

In 2014, The Matt O'Ree band played on the Light of Day Foundations main stage at The Paramount Theater before Joe Grushecky and Bruce Springsteen, adding in a bit of "Smoke On The Water" to their set.

On October 30, 2015, The Matt O'Ree Band performed a homecoming show for O'Ree's return from his tour with Bon Jovi, at The Stone Pony in Asbury Park, New Jersey to a sold-out crowd. The audience consisted of local musicians, local media, and promoters as well as fans. David Bryan with the band performed a version of Bon Jovi's song "Wanted Dead or Alive" featuring Bryan singing lead. As well as the song co-written by O'Ree and Bryan, "My Everything is You". The band also premiered their new single–the recorded version of “Black Boots” which features another New Jersey artist, Bruce Springsteen, on guest vocals and guitar, and is to be released in 2016.

=== Matt Ree band members ===
- Guitar/Vocals - Matt O'Ree
- Drums - John Hummel
- Bass - Scott Bennert
- Hammond B3 - Eric Safka
- Backing Vocals - Eryn Shewell
- Backing Vocals - Layonne Holmes

== Bon Jovi ==
In 2013 O'Ree met David Bryan of the band Bon Jovi at a local venue called Jamians, located in Red Bank, New Jersey. Bryan then performed a song with The Matt O'Ree band, forming a long time friendship. David Bryan has since helped O'Ree with his career by introducing him to Jon Bon Jovi and getting him an audition to be the guitarist in the Bon Jovi band. They have also co-written some songs; one of which is "My Everything is You". This song was also produced by Bryan for O'Ree's next album.

September 2015 saw O'Ree leave as the guitarist for the Bon Jovi Live! tour with Bon Jovi and play throughout South East Asia for 3 weeks, performing on September 11 in Jakarta, Indonesia to 45,000 people to start the tour.

On November 11, 2015, Matt O'Ree and David Bryan performed on stage with blues legend Buddy Guy at blues club B.B. Kings in New York City. He shared the stage that evening with Buddy Guy, Earl Slick, Evan Stanley (Paul Stanley's son), and backing singer Eryn Shewell.

On September 11, 2016, O'Ree was inducted into the NY/NJ Blues Hall of Fame.

== Equipment ==
He uses Trainwreck amplifiers and in 2011 recorded a promotional video for the company.

== Discography ==
- 88 Miles - 1998
- Chalk It Up - 2001
- Shelf Life - 2005
- Live - 2008
- Appears on: A Christmas to Cure Cancer - 2010
- Live in Denver, Co - 2013
- Brotherhood - 2016
