= This House Is Not for Sale – Live from the London Palladium =

Live album by Bon Jovi
- Released: December 16, 2016
- Recorded: October 10, 2016
- Venues: London Palladium, London, England
- Length: 70:36
- Label: Island
- Producer: Obie O'Brien

Bon Jovi chronology
This House Is Not for Sale (2016)	This House Is Not for Sale – Live from the London Palladium (2016)	2020 (2020)

This House Is Not for Sale – Live from the London Palladium is the third live album by American rock band Bon Jovi. It was released on December 16, 2016, by Island Records. The album contains live versions of 15 of the 21 songs from Bon Jovi's fourteenth studio album, This House Is Not for Sale, recorded at the London Palladium, London, on October 10, 2016.

== Track listing ==
No.	Title	Writer(s)	Length
1.	"This House Is Not for Sale"	Jon Bon Jovi; John Shanks; Billy Falcon	6:36
2.	"Living with the Ghost"	Bon Jovi	5:05
3.	"Knockout"	Bon Jovi; Shanks	3:38
4.	"Labor of Love"	Bon Jovi; Shanks; Falcon	5:51
5.	"Born Again Tomorrow"	Bon Jovi; Shanks; Falcon	4:07
6.	"Roller Coaster"	Bon Jovi; Chris DeStefano; Ashley Gorley	3:44
7.	"New Year's Day"	Bon Jovi; Falcon	4:32
8.	"The Devil's in the Temple"	Bon Jovi; Falcon	3:22
9.	"Scars on This Guitar"	Bon Jovi; Brett James; Falcon	5:31
10.	"God Bless This Mess"	Bon Jovi	3:18
11.	"Reunion"	Bon Jovi	4:15
12.	"Real Love"	Bon Jovi; Falcon	4:43
13.	"All Hail the King"	Bon Jovi; DeStefano; Gorley	6:08
14.	"We Don't Run"	Bon Jovi; Shanks	4:01
15.	"Come On Up to Our House"	Bon Jovi; Shanks	5:38
Total length:			70:36

== Personnel ==
Bon Jovi

- Jon Bon Jovi – lead vocals
- Phil X – lead guitar, pedal steel, backing vocals
- David Bryan – keyboards, piano, backing vocals
- Hugh McDonald – bass, backing vocals
- Tico Torres – drums, percussion

Additional personnel

- John Shanks – rhythm guitar, backing vocals
- Everett Bradley – percussion, backing vocals
