= Bon Jovi Live! =

2015 concert tour by Bon Jovi

- Tour by Bon Jovi
- Poster to the concert in Kuala Lumpur, Malaysia
- Location: Asia
- Associated album: Burning Bridges
- Start date: September 11, 2015
- End date: October 3, 2015
- No. of shows: 9

Bon Jovi concert chronology
- Because We Can: The Tour (2013); Bon Jovi Live! (2015); This House Is Not for Sale Tour (2017)

Bon Jovi Live! was a concert tour by American rock band Bon Jovi in support of their thirteenth studio album, Burning Bridges. It began on September 11, 2015, in Jakarta, Indonesia, at the Gelora Bung Karno Stadium and continued through Asia, ending on October 3, 2015, in Tel Aviv, Israel, at Yarkon Park. It was the band's first tour without longtime guitarist Richie Sambora.

== Shows ==
List of concerts, showing date, city, country, venue, opening act, tickets sold, number of available tickets and amount of gross revenue
Date	City	Country	Venue	Opening act	Attendance	Revenue
Asia
September 11, 2015	Jakarta	Indonesia	Gelora Bung Karno Stadium	Sam Tsui	40,000	—
September 15, 2015	Bangkok	Thailand	Impact Arena	—	—	—
September 19, 2015	Kuala Lumpur	Malaysia	Stadium Merdeka	—	—	—
September 20, 2015	Marina Centre	Singapore	Padang	—	—	—
September 22, 2015	Seoul	South Korea	Seoul Olympic Stadium	—	—	—
September 25, 2015	Macau	China	CotaiArena	—	—	—
September 26, 2015	Macau	China	CotaiArena	—	—	—
October 1, 2015	Abu Dhabi	United Arab Emirates	du Arena	—	—	—
October 3, 2015	Tel Aviv	Israel	Yarkon Park	Guy & Yahel	—	—

== Cancelled shows ==
List of cancelled concerts, showing date, city, country, venue and reason for cancellation
Date	City	Country	Venue	Reason
September 14, 2015	Shanghai	China	Mercedes-Benz Arena	No official reason given. Possibly banned by Chinese authorities due to support of Dalai Lama.
September 17, 2015	Beijing	China	MasterCard Center	No official reason given. Possibly banned by Chinese authorities due to support of Dalai Lama.
September 28, 2015	Taipei	Taiwan	Nangang Hall	Typhoon Dujuan hitting the region.
September 29, 2015	Taipei	Taiwan	Nangang Hall	Typhoon Dujuan hitting the region.

== Set list ==
1. "That's What the Water Made Me"
2. "You Give Love a Bad Name"
3. "Raise Your Hands"
4. "Born to Be My Baby"
5. "We Weren't Born to Follow"
6. "Lost Highway"
7. "Runaway"
8. "Because We Can"
9. "We Got It Going On"
10. "It's My Life"
11. "What About Now"
12. "We Don't Run"
13. "Captain Crash & The Beauty Queen From Mars"
14. "Someday I'll Be Saturday Night"
15. "Wanted Dead or Alive"
16. "I'll Sleep When I'm Dead"
17. "Who Says You Can't Go Home"
18. "Keep the Faith"
19. "Bad Medicine"

Encore:

20. "In These Arms"
21. "Have a Nice Day"
22. "Livin' on a Prayer"

== Personnel ==
Band

- Jon Bon Jovi - lead vocals, guitar, maracas
- David Bryan - keyboards, backing vocals
- Tico Torres - drums, percussion

Touring musicians

- Phil X - lead guitar, talkbox, backing vocals
- Hugh McDonald - bass guitar, backing vocals
- Matt O'Ree - rhythm guitar, backing vocals
