= This House Is Not for Sale Tour =

2017–19 concert tour by Bon Jovi

- Tour by Bon Jovi
- Associated album: This House Is Not for Sale
- Start date: February 8, 2017
- End date: October 2, 2019
- Legs: 6
- No. of shows: 58 in North America; 20 in Europe; 10 in South America; 4 in Oceania; 3 in Asia; 95 in Total
- Attendance: 2,268,550
- Box office: $232,1 million (91 shows)

Bon Jovi concert chronology
- Bon Jovi Live! (2015); This House Is Not for Sale Tour (2017–19); Bon Jovi 2022 Tour (2022)

The This House Is Not for Sale Tour was a concert tour by American rock band Bon Jovi in support of their album This House Is Not for Sale. The tour marked the first tour with Phil X and Hugh McDonald as official members of the band.

== Background ==
During an interview on The Ellen DeGeneres Show on October 5, 2016, Jon Bon Jovi officially announced that band would embark on tour on February 8, 2017, with a concert in Bon Secours Wellness Arena in Greenville. Ticket presales began on October 10, 2016, and everyone who purchased a ticket received a physical copy of the album This House Is Not for Sale (2016) at the time of its release.

Rehearsals for "This House Is Not for Sale" were done in Connecticut and band rehearsed around 90 songs for the tour. Tico Torres explained: "It looks like we're doing a lot more stuff in the round to have some people around us as well, which I think we always loved ... to have actual fans behind you as you're playing, and it's quite simple and it's movable," he said. "There's a lot of motion that goes with the songs. We're rehearsing it now and trying to get used to it. When you're onstage, you see it a little differently than when you're in the audience". This is the first Bon Jovi tour that marks bassist Hugh McDonald and guitarist Phil X as official band members. John Shanks, band's producer, joined on guitar along with Everett Bradley on percussion.

On February 25, 2017, during the performance of the song "I Got the Girl", Jon Bon Jovi's daughter, Stephanie, came on stage and they both danced to that song. The show in the Pepsi Center in Denver on March 14, 2017, was rescheduled to April 14, 2017, due to scheduling conflicts. On March 18, 2017, the day Chuck Berry died, Bon Jovi paid tribute to him by playing Johnny B. Goode. On March 31, 2017, there was rain during the concert in Philadelphia and the next day Jon Bon Jovi got a cold. During the performance on April 5, 2017, in Pittsburgh, Jon was still battling a sore throat because of the cold, but he insisted that the band played the concert that night. Right before the performance of the song Born to Be My Baby, Jon told the audience that he can't sing anymore and called out a fan to sing the song instead of him. After that, the band finished the show with an audience sing-along on Livin' on a Prayer. After the concert, Jon Bon Jovi's brother, Matthew Bongiovi and many fans praised Jon's effort and working ethic via Twitter. Jon was diagnosed with a bronchitis and based on his doctor's recommendations, the band rescheduled their shows in Madison Square Garden for April 7 and April 8, 2017, to April 13 and April 15, 2017.

== Opening Act Contest ==
The band held a contest to choose opening acts for the tour's first North America leg. Artists uploaded videos of themselves performing their own music and concert promoter Live Nation selected ten finalists. Bon Jovi management then picked winners from the finalists to perform twenty-minute sets. Winners of the first round were Michael Tracy for the concert in Grenville on February 8, Maradeen for the concert in Atlanta on February 10, Yardij for the concert in Sunrise on February 12, Hannah Jae for the concert in Tampa on February 14, Sweet Tea Trio for the concert in Birmingham on February 16, Jake Johnson for the concert in Nashville on February 18 and The Former Me for the concert in St. Louis on February 19, 2017. Winners of the second round were Taddy Porter for the concert in Oklahoma City on February 21, Blacktop Mojo for the concert in Dallas on February 23, Daring Greatly for the concert in Las Vegas on February 25, Natalie Gelman for the concert in Sacramento on February 28, 2017.

Winners of the third round were Thadeus Gonzales for the concert in San Jose on March 1, Luxxe for the concert in Phoenix on March 4, De La Torre for the concert in San Diego on March 5, Stellar Revival for the concert in Inglewood on March 8, 2017. Winners of the fourth round were Cusses for the concert in Memphis on March 16, Liberty Deep Down for the concert in Columbus on March 18, The Ohio Weather Band for the concert in Cleveland on March 19, Shiny Penny for the concert in Indianapolis on March 22 and The Patti Fiasco for the concert in Denver on April 14, 2017. Winners of the fifth round were 35th & Taylor for the concert in Chicago on March 26, Step Rockets for the concert in Saint Paul, Iamdynamite for the concert in Detroit on March 29, Mach 22 for the concert in Philadelphia on March 31, Analog Heart for the concert in Uncasville on April 1, 2017. Winners of the sixth round were Interlochen Singer-Songwriters for the concert in Pittsburgh on April 5, Oak & Ash for the concert in New York City on April 7, Dylan Rockoff also for the concert in New York on April 8, Beth Thornton for the concert in Toronto on April 10 and Cannons also for the concert in Toronto on April 11, 2017.

=== Opening acts ===
- Michael Tracy (February 8, 2017)
- Maradeen (February 10, 2017)
- Yardij (February 12, 2017)
- Hannah Jae (February 14, 2017)
- Sweet Tea Trio (February 16, 2017)
- Jake Johnson (February 18, 2017)
- The Former Me (February 19, 2017)
- Taddy Porter (February 21, 2017)
- Blacktop Mojo (February 23, 2017)
- Daring Greatly (February 25, 2017)
- Natalie Gelman (February 28, 2017)
- Thadeus Gonzalez (March 1, 2017)
- Luxxe (March 4, 2017)
- De La Torre (March 5, 2017)
- Stellar Revival (March 8, 2017)
- Cusses (March 16, 2017)
- Liberty Deep Down (March 18, 2017)
- The Ohio Weather Band (March 19, 2017)
- Shiny Penny (March 22, 2017)
- 35th & Taylor (March 26, 2017)
- Step Rockets (March 27, 2017)
- Iamdynamite (March 29, 2017)
- Mach22 (March 31, 2017)
- Analog Heart (April 1, 2017)
- Interlochen Singer-Songwriters (April 5, 2017)
- Beth Thornton (April 10, 2017)
- Cannons (April 11, 2017)
- Oak & Ash (April 13, 2017)
- Dylan Rockoff (April 15, 2017)
- Temple Agents (September 14, 2017)
- Airbag (September 16, 2017)
- The Patti Fiasco (March 14, 2018)
- Hold On Hollywood (March 23, 2018)
- Tempt (May 10, 2018)
- Goodnight, Sunrise (May 12, 2018)

== Live recordings ==
Every show from the North American leg of the tour was recorded and offered as a digital download. Live recordings could be downloaded from band's official store as MP3 files, high resolution FLAC files or could be purchased as an exclusive USB bracelet; USB bracelets were offered on every North American show. All the live recordings were available two to three days after the concerts.

== Critical and commercial reception ==
Donna Isbell Walker from The Greenville News said about first show in Greenville that "In the song [Livin' on a Prayer], Tommy and Gina have each other “and that’s a lot.” Bon Jovi and the audience made it clear that they have each other too, and on Wednesday, it seemed like more than a lot". Melissa Ruggieri from The Atlanta Journal-Constitution said that "While this isn’t Bon Jovi’s flashiest tour, it solidifies their standing as one of rock’s most resilient acts". Jay Cridlin from Tampa Bay Times said about concert in Tampa Bay that "After more than three decades, Bon Jovi still knows how to make a Florida crowd feel special. Only one fan walked away with a Valentine’s Day kiss. But everyone else felt the love." Cindy Watts form The Tennessean said for concert in Bridgestone Arena in Nashville that "there was also a finely-honed, record-setting rock band that proved its music, just like its singer, is ageless". Kevin C. Johnson from St. Louis Post-Dispatch said about concert in St. Louis's Scottrade Center that "Bon Jovi’s not missing a beat; it’s still Bon Jovi as you know it...You know what you’re getting with Bon Jovi. There’s nothing revolutionary here, but it’s the uncomplicated feel of it all that’s so appealing, even to this day". Markos Papadatos from Digital Journal for concert on April 13, 2017. said that "Bon Jovi's live show at Madison Square Garden garnered an A rating". For the same concert, Jay Lustig from Asbury Park Press said that "Bon Jovi’s muscles may ache but he still, at 55, has an athletic, energetic stage presence. His voice may have lost a bit of its power, but the band covers for that effectively by making virtually every chorus a group effort". Chris Jordan, also from Asbury Park Press, said that Bon Jovi "delivered — a Garden party, with memories of the past and eyes on the future."

Bon Jovi broke the attendance record in Nashville's Bridgestone with 18,514 fans attending the concert. The Arena Tour grossed $31.2 million in revenue from North American concerts occurred during the first quarter of 2017. The band sold total of 359,055 tickets from 23 arena performances during a seven-week time period beginning with the February 8th opener through the end of March.

== Set list ==
This set list is from the June 16, 2019, concert in Dublin. It is not intended to represent all concerts for the tour.

1. This House Is Not for Sale
2. Raise Your Hands
3. You Give Love a Bad Name
4. Born to Be My Baby
5. Roller Coaster
6. Lost Highway
7. Runaway
8. We Weren't Born to Follow
9. Have a Nice Day
10. Keep the Faith
11. (You Want to) Make a Memory
12. Bed of Roses
13. In These Arms
14. It's My Life
15. We Don't Run
16. Wanted Dead or Alive
17. Lay Your Hands on Me
18. Captain Crash & the Beauty Queen from Mars
19. We Got it Goin' On
20. I'll Sleep When I'm Dead
21. Bad Medicine

Encore:

22. Someday I'll Be Saturday Night
23. I'll Be There For You
24. Livin' on a Prayer

Encore 2:

25. These Days

== Tour dates ==
Date	City	Country	Venue	Support	Attendance	Box Office
North America
February 8, 2017	Greenville	United States	Bon Secours Wellness Arena	—N/a	14,474 / 14,564	$1,614,852
February 10, 2017	Atlanta	United States	Philips Arena	—N/a	16,308 / 16,665	$1,396,007
February 12, 2017	Sunrise	United States	BB&T Center	—N/a	16,576 / 16,882	$1,640,789
February 14, 2017	Tampa	United States	Amalie Arena	—N/a	16,568 / 16,883	$1,470,866
February 16, 2017	Birmingham	United States	Legacy Arena	—N/a	13,743 / 14,128	$1,010,332
February 18, 2017	Nashville	United States	Bridgestone Arena	—N/a	18,514 / 18,514	$1,767,100
February 19, 2017	St. Louis	United States	Scottrade Center	—N/a	17,098 / 17,549	$1,181,078
February 21, 2017	Oklahoma City	United States	Chesapeake Energy Arena	—N/a	13,262 / 13,454	$913,200
February 23, 2017	Dallas	United States	American Airlines Center	—N/a	16,246 / 16,978	$1,662,400
February 25, 2017	Las Vegas	United States	T-Mobile Arena	—N/a	17,518 / 17,518	$2,273,877
February 28, 2017	Sacramento	United States	Golden 1 Center	—N/a	15,950 / 16,318	$1,322,335
March 1, 2017	San Jose	United States	SAP Center	—N/a	15,320 / 15,580	$1,198,309
March 4, 2017	Phoenix	United States	Talking Stick Resort Arena	—N/a	16,097 / 16,097	$1,342,678
March 5, 2017	San Diego	United States	Viejas Arena	—N/a	11,153 / 11,875	$1,190,868
March 8, 2017	Inglewood	United States	The Forum	—N/a	16,601 / 16,811	$1,473,888
March 16, 2017	Memphis	United States	FedExForum	—N/a	14,986 / 15,229	$964,562
March 18, 2017	Columbus	United States	Nationwide Arena	—N/a	17,914 / 18,293	$1,535,846
March 19, 2017	Cleveland	United States	Quicken Loans Arena	—N/a	14,081 / 14,633	$1,804,138
March 22, 2017	Indianapolis	United States	Bankers Life Fieldhouse	—N/a	15,009 / 15,710	$1,089,074
March 26, 2017	Chicago	United States	United Center	—N/a	18,429 / 18,718	$1,543,878
March 27, 2017	Saint Paul	United States	Xcel Energy Center	—N/a	17,234 / 17,870	$1,570,440
March 29, 2017	Detroit	United States	Joe Louis Arena	—N/a	16,001 / 16,385	$1,244,404
March 31, 2017	Philadelphia	United States	Wells Fargo Center	—N/a	18,973 / 19,146	$1,709,522
April 1, 2017	Uncasville	United States	Mohegan Sun Arena	—N/a	8,602 / 8,602	$1,491,610
April 5, 2017 (Note: The concert of April 5, 2017, in Pittsburgh at the PPG Paints Arena was shortened due to lead singer Jon Bon Jovi having a sore throat.)	Pittsburgh	United States	PPG Paints Arena	—N/a	15,619 / 15,780	$1,146,979
April 10, 2017	Toronto	Canada	Air Canada Centre	—N/a	33,359 / 33,359	$2,553,880
April 11, 2017	Toronto	Canada	Air Canada Centre	—N/a	33,359 / 33,359	$2,553,880
April 13, 2017 (Note: The concerts of April 13 and 15, 2017, were originally scheduled to take place on April 7 and 8, 2017, but were rescheduled due to Bon Jovi contracting bronchitis.)	New York City	United States	Madison Square Garden	—N/a	37,573 / 37,573	$4,942,783
April 15, 2017	New York City	United States	Madison Square Garden	—N/a	37,573 / 37,573	$4,942,783
August 18, 2017	Endicott	United States	En-Joie Golf Course	—N/a	—N/a	—N/a
South America				—N/a		
September 14, 2017	Santiago	Chile	Estadio Monumental David Arellano	Temple Agents	37,166 / 40,000	$2,448,132
September 16, 2017	Buenos Aires	Argentina	José Amalfitani Stadium	Airbag	38,781 / 38,781	$3,441,269
September 19, 2017	Porto Alegre	Brazil	Estádio Beira-Rio	The Kills	47,850 / 48,285	$5,820,640
September 22, 2017 (Note: The September 22, 2017, concert in Rio de Janeiro was part of Rock in Rio.)	Rio de Janeiro	Brazil	Barra Olympic Park	—N/a	—N/a	—N/a
September 23, 2017 (Note: The September 23, 2017, concert in São Paulo was part of the São Paulo Trip.)	São Paulo	Brazil	Allianz Parque	—N/a	—N/a	—N/a
North America
March 14, 2018 (Note: The concert of March 14, 2018, in Denver at the Pepsi Center was originally scheduled to take place on March 14, 2017, but was again rescheduled on April 14, 2017.)	Denver	United States	Pepsi Center	—N/a	12,683 / 16,229	$914,977
March 16, 2018	Salt Lake City	United States	Vivint Smart Home Arena	—N/a	11,093 / 12,351	$1,077,603
March 17, 2018	Las Vegas	United States	T-Mobile Arena	—N/a	15,033 / 15,033	$1,350,311
March 20, 2018	North Little Rock	United States	Verizon Arena	—N/a	10,728 / 13,377	$537,994
March 22, 2018	San Antonio	United States	AT&T Center	—N/a	14,306 / 15,797	$1,332,901
March 23, 2018	Houston	United States	Toyota Center	—N/a	13,629 / 14,372	$1,299,066
March 25, 2018	New Orleans	United States	Smoothie King Center	—N/a	11,040 / 14,623	$1,072,066
March 26, 2018	Dallas	United States	American Airlines Center	—N/a	14,743 / 17,692	$1,123,118
April 2, 2018	Boston	United States	TD Garden	—N/a	15,815 / 15,815	$1,914,450
April 7, 2018	Newark	United States	Prudential Center	—N/a	26,315 / 26,315	$3,077,212
April 8, 2018	Newark	United States	Prudential Center	—N/a	26,315 / 26,315	$3,077,212
April 18, 2018	Orlando	United States	Amway Center	—N/a	14,453 / 14,453	$1,521,957
April 20, 2018	Atlanta	United States	Philips Arena	—N/a	12,667 / 12,667	$1,205,207
April 21, 2018	Charlotte	United States	Spectrum Center	—N/a	15,812 / 15,812	$1,534,994
April 24, 2018	Raleigh	United States	PNC Arena	—N/a	15,237 / 15,237	$1,190,087
April 26, 2018	Chicago	United States	United Center	—N/a	15,787 / 15,787	$1,611,605
April 28, 2018	Saint Paul	United States	Xcel Energy Center	—N/a	16,598 / 16,598	$1,675,733
April 29, 2018	Milwaukee	United States	BMO Harris Bradley Center	—N/a	15,495 / 15,495	$1,554,506
May 2, 2018	Allentown	United States	PPL Center	—N/a	9,040 / 9,040	$1,354,173
May 3, 2018	Philadelphia	United States	Wells Fargo Center	—N/a	17,458 / 17,458	$1,415,188
May 5, 2018	Uncasville	United States	Mohegan Sun Arena	—N/a	9,159 / 9,159	$1,514,260
May 7, 2018	Ottawa	Canada	Canadian Tire Centre	—N/a	14,599 / 14,599	$1,251,910
May 9, 2018	New York City	United States	Madison Square Garden	—N/a	33,152 / 33,152	$4,168,374
May 10, 2018	New York City	United States	Madison Square Garden	—N/a	33,152 / 33,152	$4,168,374
May 12, 2018	Toronto	Canada	Air Canada Centre	—N/a	17,721 / 17,721	$2,432,588
May 14, 2018	Washington, D.C.	United States	Capital One Arena	—N/a	16,237 / 16,503	$1,612,555
May 17, 2018	Montreal	Canada	Bell Centre	—N/a	34,949 / 34,949	$3,194,750
May 18, 2018	Montreal	Canada	Bell Centre	—N/a	34,949 / 34,949	$3,194,750
Japan / Australia
November 26, 2018	Tokyo	Japan	Tokyo Dome	—N/a	42,300 / 42,300	$5,931,693
November 27, 2018	Osaka	Japan	Kyocera Dome Osaka	—N/a	26,116 / 26,116	$3,220,658
December 1, 2018	Melbourne	Australia	Melbourne Cricket Ground	Birds of Tokyo	64,314 / 64,314	$9,105,922
December 4, 2018	Adelaide	Australia	Adelaide Botanic Park	Birds of Tokyo	16,723 / 16,723	$2,196,445
December 6, 2018	Brisbane	Australia	Suncorp Stadium	Birds of Tokyo	42,316 / 42,316	$4,727,542
December 8, 2018	Sydney	Australia	ANZ Stadium	Birds of Tokyo	49,553 / 49,553	$6,907,548
Europe / Israel
May 31, 2019	Moscow	Russia	Luzhniki Stadium	The Blackfires	35,419 / 35,419	$3,800,453
June 2, 2019	Tallinn	Estonia	Tallinn Song Festival Grounds	Santa Cruz, Terminaator	42,403 / 42,403	$3,561,073
June 5, 2019	Stockholm	Sweden	Tele2 Arena	Blackberry Smoke	35,419 / 35,419	$3,484,752
June 8, 2019	Stavanger	Norway	Sr-Bank Arena	Skambankt	25,222 / 25,222	$2,945,794
June 11, 2019	Sønderborg	Denmark	Slagmarken	Def Leppard	24,268 / 24,268	$2,854,298
June 13, 2019	Nijmegen	Netherlands	Goffertpark	Kensington/Navarone	45,649 / 45,649	$4,373,173
June 15, 2019	Dublin	Ireland	RDS Arena	Manic Street Preachers	58,688 / 58,688	$6,491,574
June 16, 2019	Dublin	Ireland	RDS Arena	Manic Street Preachers	58,688 / 58,688	$6,491,574
June 19, 2019	Liverpool	England	Anfield	Manic Street Preachers	44,547 / 44,547	$4,165,691
June 21, 2019	London	England	Wembley Stadium	Manic Street Preachers	69,674 / 69,674	$8,567,011
June 23, 2019	Coventry	England	Ricoh Arena	Manic Street Preachers	38,555 / 38,555	$4,394,774
July 3, 2019	Düsseldorf	Germany	Merkur Spiel-Arena	Def Leppard	45,095 / 45,095	$4,442,445
July 5, 2019	Munich	Germany	Olympiastadion	Def Leppard	72,174 / 72,174	$7,336,345
July 7, 2019	Madrid	Spain	Wanda Metropolitano	Marea	54,040 / 57,682	$5,476,730
July 10, 2019	Zürich	Switzerland	Letzigrund	Switchfoot	38,981 / 38,981	$3,884,430
July 12, 2019	Warsaw	Poland	PGE Narodowy	Switchfoot	48,846 / 48,846	$3,170,605
July 14, 2019 (Note: The July 14, 2019, concert in Werchter was part of TW Classic.)	Werchter	Belgium	Werchter Festival Grounds	—N/a	—N/a	—N/a
July 17, 2019	Vienna	Austria	Ernst-Happel-Stadion	Switchfoot	56,367 / 56,367	$5,515,436
July 19, 2019	Klagenfurt	Austria	Wörthersee Stadion	Skid Row Switchfoot	41,751 / 41,751	$3,714,203
July 21, 2019	Bucharest	Romania	Piața Constituției	Firma	61,129 / 61,129	$3,575,000
July 25, 2019	Tel Aviv	Israel	Yarkon Park	—N/a	44,496 / 44,496	$3,480,271
South America
September 22, 2019	Recife	Brazil	Estádio do Arruda	Goo Goo Dolls	35,957 / 35,957	$2,138,994
September 25, 2019	São Paulo	Brazil	Allianz Parque	Goo Goo Dolls	48,709 / 48,709	$4,697,463
September 27, 2019	Curitiba	Brazil	Pedreira Paulo Leminski	Goo Goo Dolls	22,714 / 22,714	$2,399,187
September 29, 2019 (Note: The September 29, 2019, concert in Rio de Janeiro was part of Rock in Rio.)	Rio de Janeiro	Brazil	Barra Olympic Park	—N/a	28,460	
October 2, 2019	Lima	Peru	Estadio Nacional del Perú	Goo Goo Dolls	33,310 / 33,310	$2,186,398
Total					2,268,550	$232,173,450

== Personnel ==
- Jon Bon Jovi – lead vocals, guitar
- Phil X – lead guitar, talk box, backing vocals
- David Bryan – keyboards, backing vocals
- Hugh McDonald – bass, backing vocals
- Tico Torres – drums, percussion

Additional musicians

- John Shanks – rhythm guitar, backing vocals
- Everett Bradley – percussion, backing vocals
