= Live at the London Palladium (disambiguation) =

Live at the London Palladium may refer to:

== Music ==
- Live at the London Palladium (Judy Garland and Liza Minnelli album), 1965
- Live at the London Palladium (Marvin Gaye album), 1976
- Bing Crosby Live at the London Palladium, album by Bing Crosby 1976
- This House Is Not for Sale – Live from the London Palladium, album by Bon Jovi
- Live at the London Palladium, album by America (band)
- Live at the London Palladium, album by Jane McDonald
- Live at the London Palladium, album by Paul Carrack
- Live at the London Palladium, video album by Engelbert Humperdinck
- Fever! Live At The London Palladium, album by Peggy Lee
- Live at the London Palladium, audio album by Victor Borge
- Live at the London Palladium, album by Jack Jones (American singer) 1995

== Comedy ==
- Live at the London Palladium, audio comedy album by Jackie Mason
- Live at the London Palladium, video by Mike Reid (comedian)
- Live at the London Palladium, video by Bruce Forsyth
- Live at the London Palladium, video by Joan Rivers
- Live at the London Palladium, video by Jack Dee
