= Shewell =

Shewell is both a given name and surname. Notable people with the name include:

- Eryn Shewell, American self-taught jazz and blues guitarist and vocalist
- Shewell Cooper (1900–1982), British organic gardener and pioneer of no dig gardening
- Tanya Thornton Shewell (born 1944), American politician
