= Powder (American band) =

American pop rock band

- Origin: Los Angeles
- Genres: Pop rock, nu metal
- Years active: 2001–2010
- Past members: Phil X; Ninette Terhart; Allan Hearn; Jeremy Spencer; Daniel Spriewald

Powder were a Los Angeles pop rock band formed in 2001 by vocalist Ninette Terhart and Canadian guitarist Phil X, now of Bon Jovi.

In 2000, the band provided a "band camp" to teach the stars of the 2001 film Josie and the Pussycats how to perform like a band.

In 2011, Phil X and Terhart composed songs for the family-friendly group Party Animals.

== Former band members ==
- Ninette Terhart – lead vocals (2001–2010)
- Phil X – guitars (2001–2010)
- Allan Hearn – bass guitar (2001–2006)
- Daniel Spriewald – bass guitar (2006–2010)
- Jeremy Spencer (J-bo Dynamite) – drums (2001–2010)
- Yariv "Vee" Vaknin – drums (2010-2012)
- Brian "Dogboy" Burwell – drums (2012–2013)

== Discography ==
- 2002: Sonic Machine
- 2004: Powder
- 2008: Nothing
