= Kick Your Ass in 17 Minutes =

Studio album by Phil X & The Drills
- Released: September 2009
- Genre: Hard rock
- Length: 17:00
- Labels: Goldielocks & Xman Productions
- Producer: Phil X

Phil X & The Drills chronology
Kick Your Ass in 17 Minutes (2009)	We Bring the Rock N Roll (2011)

Kick Your Ass in 17 Minutes. is the debut studio album by Los Angeles rock band The Drills, fronted by Canadian guitarist, singer and songwriter Phil X. It is the only album to feature the first Drills line-up. The last track is a medley of vocals taken from the rest of the album.

== Track listing ==
1. "Air Hockey Champion of the World"
2. "Beautiful Apartment"
3. "Sunny Days"
4. "Middle Finger"
5. "I Wish My Beer Was As Cold As Your Heart"
6. "From the Future"
7. "Medley: Aneurism"

== Personnel ==
- Phil X – guitars, vocals
- Daniel Spree – bass, backing vocals
- Brian "Dogboy" Burwell – drums
