= Face Facts =

Studio album by T. Roth and Another Pretty Face
- Released: 1980
- Recorded: 1979
- Genre: Glam rock
- Label: Reflection Records; Riverworks Records
- Producer: Ed Stasium

T. Roth and Another Pretty Face chronology
21st Century Rock (1974)	Face Facts (1980)	Still Pretty? (2011)

Face Facts is a 1980 album from glam rock band T. Roth and Another Pretty Face. Bon Jovi drummer Tico Torres plays on the album.

T. Roth and Another Pretty Face recorded the album in the late 1970s with future Ramones producer Ed Stasium.

The band recorded their first album in 1974 entitled 21st Century Rock, also produced by Ed Stasium, and RCA did not release it and shelved the album.

== Track listing ==
No.	Title	Length
1.	"Late Night Radio (Intro)"	5:24
2.	"She's a Woman"	4:18
3.	"Power Play/Surrender"	5:28
4.	"Good Morning"	2:46
5.	"People in Love"	3:38
6.	"Girls"	3:28
7.	"Wild Child"	4:26
8.	"Winter Wonderland"	7:17
