= T. Roth and Another Pretty Face =

American glam rock band

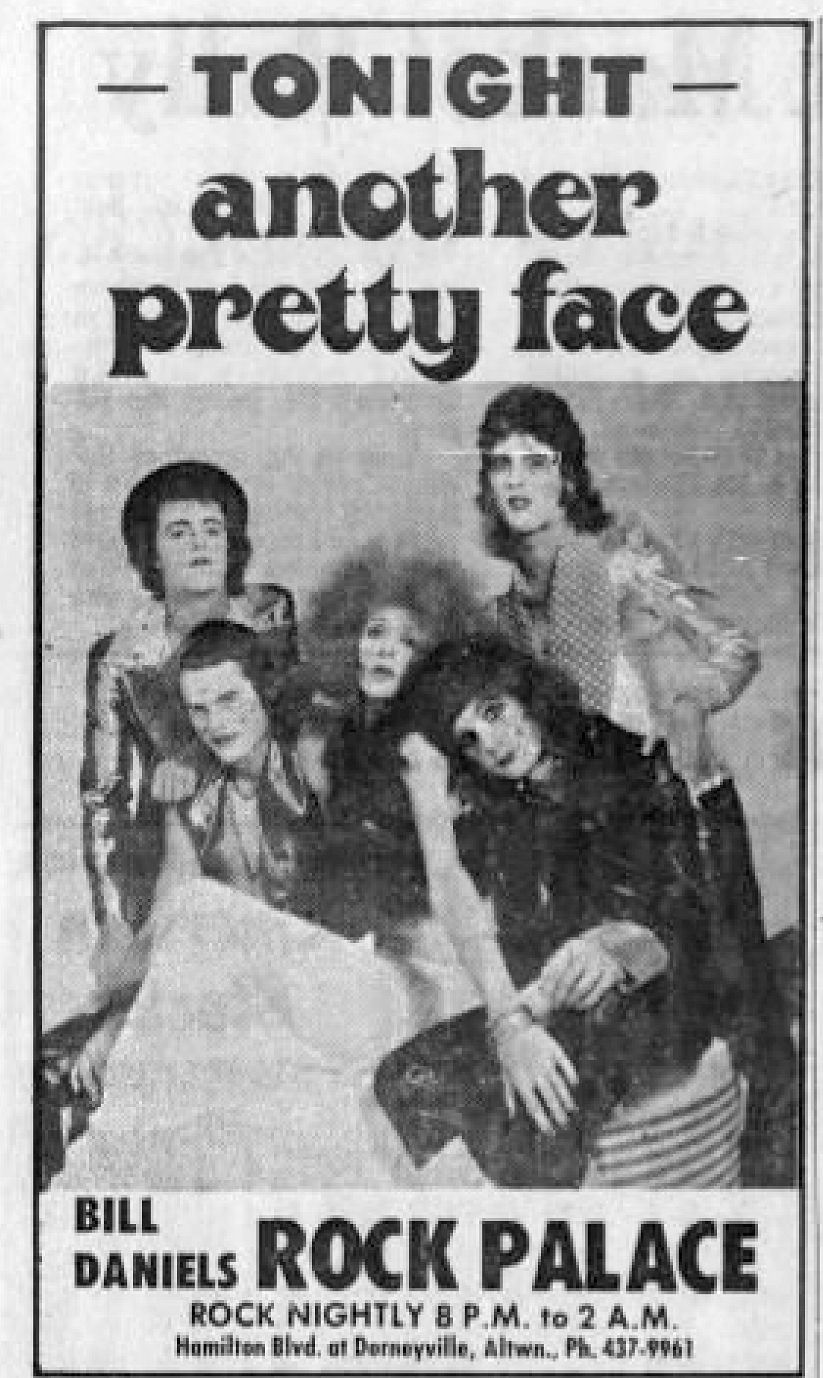
- 1973 newspaper concert advertisement

Background information
- Origin: New York City, New York, United States
- Genres: Rock, glam rock
- Labels: RCA, Reflection Records, Riverworks Records
- Past members: Tico Torres; Terry Roth; Paul Scattaretico

T. Roth and Another Pretty Face was an American glam rock band.

== Description ==
Another Pretty Face started out as a horn band that played frat parties on and around the campus of Lafayette College in Easton, Pennsylvania. The band was composed entirely of Lafayette students. One by one, as the original members left, new local talent was brought in from the neighboring cities. Once T. Roth was brought into the fold, the whole direction of the band changed. T. had no interest in playing weddings and frat parties with a "chicaho-ish" horn band so the horns were relieved of their duty and the band was turned into a five-piece proper rock band. The members were Terry Palmer on drums, Rob Nevitte on guitar, Russ Cunningham on bass, Larry D'amelio on Keyboards and T. Roth on vocals.

The band recorded its first album in 1974, entitled 21st Century Rock, produced by Ed Stasium, and RCA did not release it but shelved the album. In the mid-1970s the band broke up and new musicians joined T. for A.P.F. 2.0. The band consisted of Paul Scatt on keyboards, Angleo Arimborgo on guitar, Paul Scatt on drums and Larry Carter on bass. Paul Scatt left the band toward the late 1970s and Tico Torres (Later of Bon Jovi fame) joined the band.

T. Roth and Another Pretty Face recorded their next album in the late 1970s, with Randy Adler and Thom Cimillo as producers. Face Facts was released in 1980 by Reflection Records.

In 2011, T. Roth and Another Pretty Face released a new album entitled Still Pretty?

Terry Roth also performed as the lead singer of Zen For Primates and on YouTube under the name Zipster08 until his death on April 22, 2023.

== Discography ==
- 21st Century Rock (1974)
- Face Facts (1980)
- Still Pretty? (2011)
