= This House Is Not for Sale =

Studio album by Bon Jovi
- Released: November 4, 2016
- Recorded: 2015–2016
- Studios: Power Station, New York City
- Genres: Arena rock; pop rock
- Length: 49:08
- Label: Island
- Producers: Jon Bon Jovi; John Shanks

Bon Jovi chronology
| Burning Bridges (2015) | This House Is Not for Sale (2016) | This House Is Not for Sale – Live from the London Palladium (2016) |

Singles from This House Is Not for Sale
- 1. "This House Is Not for Sale" Released: August 12, 2016; 2. "Knockout" Released: October 21, 2016; 3. "Labor of Love" Released: November 4, 2016; 4. "Born Again Tomorrow" Released: December 23, 2016; 5. "When We Were Us" Released: February 23, 2018; 6. "Walls" Released: March 2018

This House Is Not for Sale is the fourteenth studio album by American rock band Bon Jovi. It was released on November 4, 2016, by Island Records. It is the band's first studio album with Phil X on lead guitar after he replaced founding member Richie Sambora in 2013, as well as the first album to feature bassist Hugh McDonald as an official member after having played with the band in a touring/session capacity since 1994.

Critical reception was mixed, mostly describing the album as well-made but formulaic. This House Is Not for Sale debuted at number one on the Billboard 200 with 129,000 album-equivalent units, of which 128,000 were pure album sales. In the United Kingdom, the album debuted at number five on the UK Albums Chart, selling 21,448 units in its first week. The album was reissued in 2018 featuring "When We Were Us" and "Walls" as bonus tracks.

== Background ==
This album was the band's first not to be released by Mercury Records and its parent label Universal Music Group, subsequent to the conclusion of their 32-year relationship with the release of the band's previous album Burning Bridges. On September 30, 2015, in an interview for a star2.com, Jon confirmed that the album was going to be called This House Is Not for Sale, describing the album as a "really going back to the beginning". Describing the album, he also said: "This record is about our integrity. Integrity matters and we're at a stage of our career where we don't have anything left to prove. Some songs have a little more of the ‘chip on my shoulder’ sound which is OK for us to have right now." He also confirmed that former lead guitarist Richie Sambora would not be returning to the band following his absence from the Burning Bridges album. Lyrics on the album talk about difficulties Jon encountered during 2014–2015. Jon explained: "A lot happened. Richie's sudden departure, my trying to buy the [Buffalo] Bills and now this with the label. I have a lot of material to write about. Believe me, the new record is good. It's pointed. It is something we are going to be very proud of in the spring when we put it out."

== Lyrics and composition ==
Title track "This House Is Not for Sale" was inspired by a picture by Jerry Uelsmann that Jon Bon Jovi saw in a magazine. It is a proud old house with deep roots that was in disrepair. Since Jon was actually selling his house at that time, the title came to his mind subliminally. The song is about integrity and where band members were at that time. The line "These four walls have got a story to tell" symbolize each of the four members of the band.

"Living with the Ghost" is a song that deals with the subject of loss. "Knockout" is about the fight between man and his hope. "Labor of Love" is a song about love and relationships. "Born Again Tomorrow" is a song about looking back on life and asking yourself: Would you change anything or would you live it the same way?. "Roller Coaster" is a song about Jon's life, the love and all the low blows along the way. With provocative lyrics like "life ain't a merry go round" and "What goes up might take us upside down", "Roller Coaster"'s political agenda is clear. "New Year's Day" is a song about the cohesion of the band; it was originally written in 6/8 time, but turned out to be much faster in the studio when Tico Torres counted the beat and all the other band members jumped in. "The Devil's in the Temple" is a song about the band's record label and situation in music industry. Jon explained: "I’ve always had only one dream: To write songs and to present them in this church. It wasn’t easy to put away the changes in the industry, which led us to change our relationship with this former ‘home’ after 33 years. Fortunately, we have left this chapter behind us now."

"Scars on This Guitar" is a song about Jon's guitar. "God Bless This Mess" is a song about surviving through the downs of life. "Reunion" is a song that Jon wrote after he accepted an honorary doctorate from Rutgers University. "Come on Up to Our House" is a song about the people who are persuaded to come and stay in the house for a party together. "We Don't Run" is described as a “defiant song in the face of adversity and it addresses the record company situation that Jon went through and future of the band being called into question. The song is a battle cry for anyone who feels their back against the wall.”

== Release and promotion ==
On May 25, 2016, Bon Jovi announced via social media and their website that the album was finished. Billboard reported that Bon Jovi had re-signed with Universal Music, with the album being released on Island Records. The title track and its official music video were released on August 12, 2016. It was also announced that the album would be released on October 21, 2016. This album is also the first which features long time session bassist Hugh McDonald and new lead guitarist Phil X becoming official members, although producer John Shanks was responsible for creating and performing most of the rhythm guitar work in the album. On October 5, 2016, Jon Bon Jovi announced their 2017 live concert world tour, This House Is Not for Sale Tour on The Ellen DeGeneres Show. On the same date it was announced that the release date has been pushed back from October 21 to November 4, 2016.

Through October, four intimate TIDAL X: Bon Jovi live listening parties at intimate venues presented the album front-to-back for fans in Red Bank NJ, London UK, Toronto ON, and New York City.

=== Artwork ===
The album artwork features a black and white image by photographer Jerry Uelsmann and depicts a house anchored by deep roots. Jon Bon Jovi became inspired by the image when he saw it several years prior to the recording of the album. According to Bon Jovi, it was the inspiration for the album's title track and said of the image: "That picture told our story…now it’s our album cover".

== Singles ==
"This House Is Not for Sale" was released as the album's lead single on August 12, 2016, and features a music video which was directed by Indrani. "Knockout" was released as the second single with a music video released on October 21, 2016. "Labor of Love" was released as the third single with a music video on November 4, 2016. "Born Again Tomorrow" was released as the fourth single with a music video on December 23, 2016. "Roller Coaster" was quoted on live shows as the band's new "Hit Single" and was released as a promo single reaching number 11 on the Adult Contemporary chart, number 34 on the Top 40 Adult Airplay chart and number 50 on the Hot Rock and Alternative charts.

"When We Were Us", one of two new songs on the 2018 reissue of the album, marked the highest debut for a non-holiday single since 2001 on Billboard's Adult Contemporary radio airplay chart when it launched at number 15 on the chart dated March 17, 2018, later reaching a peak of number 11. The other song on the reissued album, "Walls", was also released as a single. Music videos were released for both singles from the 2018 reissue of the album.

== Music videos ==
Including the singles music videos were released for every track of the standard album version. The official music video for "This House is Not for Sale," directed by Indrani Pal-Chaudhuri was released on August 12, 2016. "Come on Up to Our House" was released on November 11, 2016, "Scars on This Guitar" on November 25, 2016, "The Devil's in the Temple" on December 9, 2016, "Roller Coaster" on December 16, 2016, "New Year's Day" on December 30, 2016, "God Bless This Mess" on January 13, 2017, and both "Living with the Ghost" and "Reunion" being released on January 27, 2017, with a documentary and "Spiritual Warfare (Combined both of "Living with the Ghost" and "Reunion" Music Videos)" focused at the Camden, New Jersey.

== Critical reception ==
Professional ratings
Aggregate scores
| Source | Rating |
|---|---|
| Metacritic | 59/100 |
Review scores
| Source | Rating |
| AllMusic | 3.5/5 stars |
| Classic Rock | 2.5/5 stars |
| Drowned in Sound | 5/10 |
| The Guardian | 3/5 stars |
| Kerrang! | 3/5 stars |
| The Independent | 2/5 stars |

At Metacritic, which assigns a normalised rating out of 100 to reviews from mainstream critics, the album has received an average score of 59 out of 100, which indicates mixed or average reviews, based on 6 reviews.

AllMusic's Stephen Thomas Erlewine said that "Bon Jovi and Shanks may not have done much to freshen up the band's sound–they don't take any mid-2010s musical trends into consideration–but that simmering defiance does mean this is the band's liveliest album in years." Dave Simpson from The Guardian stated that the album "doesn’t tear up the old formula" and that "there are still stadium-ready rock songs and chant-friendly choruses." Andy Gill from The Independent said that "the comforting simplicities peddled in tracks like "Reunion" and "Knockout" offer the rock equivalent of Donald Trump, currying favour without getting too specific." Emma Johnston from Classic Rock said that "This House Is Not for Sale is no masterpiece, and while the punchy title track sonically nods to their heyday, most of it is made up of by-numbers pop".

Andy McDonald from Drowned in Sound gave the album rate 5 out of 10 saying that "The arena-filling sound that runs through modern music owes something to Bon Jovi, but This House… comes across more like their third-tier spiritual successors, comprised of forgettable dance-rock and schmaltzy slow-burners loaded with endless platitudes and those echoey, staccato guitar lines that bands do when they want to sound big".

== Commercial performance ==
This House Is Not for Sale debuted at number one on the Billboard 200 with 129,000 album-equivalent units, of which 128,000 were pure album sales. It is Bon Jovi's sixth US number-one album and it also became their fourth album in a row to hit No. 1 in the US after What About Now, The Circle and Lost Highway. In the album's second week, it dropped to number 43, replacing Incubus's 2006 album Light Grenades for the biggest drop from number one in Billboard 200 history at that time. The band had a previous album fall far from number one: 2009's The Circle. They are the only band to have multiple places on the list. It also suffered the largest second-week pure sales drop for a number one in Top Album Sales history during its second week, of 91.71 percent, down to 11,000. The following week, it fell to number 127, which makes it the shortest top 100 charting number-one album in Billboard 200 history. In the following weeks it fell to number 166, then to 189. In weeks six and seven it rose to 173, then to 155. In March 2018, the album re-entered the chart at number one due to a concert ticket redemption offer for the album, with 120,000 album-equivalent units earned in the week ending March 1. The following week, it fell to number 169, the album now having both the largest and fifth largest drops from number one. As of January 2017, the album had sold 174,000 copies in the United States.

== Track listing ==
This House Is Not for Sale – Standard version
| No. | Title | Writer(s) | Length |
|---|---|---|---|
| 1. | "This House Is Not for Sale" | Jon Bon Jovi; John Shanks; Billy Falcon | 3:36 |
| 2. | "Living with the Ghost" | Bon Jovi | 4:44 |
| 3. | "Knockout" | Bon Jovi; Shanks | 3:29 |
| 4. | "Labor of Love" | Bon Jovi; Shanks; Falcon | 5:03 |
| 5. | "Born Again Tomorrow" | Bon Jovi; Shanks; Falcon | 3:33 |
| 6. | "Roller Coaster" | Bon Jovi; Chris DeStefano; Ashley Gorley | 3:40 |
| 7. | "New Year's Day" | Bon Jovi; Falcon | 4:27 |
| 8. | "The Devil's in the Temple" | Bon Jovi; Falcon | 3:19 |
| 9. | "Scars on This Guitar" | Bon Jovi; Brett James; Falcon | 5:06 |
| 10. | "God Bless This Mess" | Bon Jovi | 3:23 |
| 11. | "Reunion" | Bon Jovi | 4:14 |
| 12. | "Come On Up to Our House" | Bon Jovi; Shanks | 4:35 |
| Total length: | | | 49:08 |

This House Is Not for Sale – North American deluxe version (bonus tracks)
| No. | Title | Writer(s) | Length |
|---|---|---|---|
| 13. | "Real Love" | Bon Jovi; Falcon | 4:34 |
| 14. | "All Hail the King" | Bon Jovi; DeStefano; Gorley | 4:54 |
| 15. | "We Don't Run (2016 Remix featuring Phil X)" | Bon Jovi; Shanks | 3:17 |
| Total length: | | | 61:52 |

This House Is Not for Sale – International deluxe version (bonus tracks)
| No. | Title | Writer(s) | Length |
|---|---|---|---|
| 13. | "Real Love" | Bon Jovi; Falcon | 4:34 |
| 14. | "All Hail the King" | Bon Jovi; DeStefano; Gorley | 4:54 |
| 15. | "We Don't Run (2016 Remix featuring Phil X)" | Bon Jovi; Shanks | 3:16 |
| 16. | "I Will Drive You Home" | Bon Jovi; Falcon; Luke Laird | 4:42 |
| 17. | "Goodnight New York" | Bon Jovi; Shanks; Falcon | 3:53 |
| Total length: | | | 70:28 |

This House Is Not for Sale – German (Media Markt, Saturn), Japanese version and Target
| No. | Title | Writer(s) | Length |
|---|---|---|---|
| 13. | "Real Love" | Bon Jovi; Falcon | 4:34 |
| 14. | "All Hail the King" | Bon Jovi; DeStefano; Gorley | 4:54 |
| 15. | "We Don't Run (2016 Remix featuring Phil X)" | Bon Jovi; Shanks | 3:16 |
| 16. | "I Will Drive You Home" | Bon Jovi; Falcon; Laird | 4:42 |
| 17. | "Goodnight New York" | Bon Jovi; Shanks; Falcon | 3:53 |
| 18. | "Touch of Grey" | Bon Jovi; Falcon; James | 4:06 |
| Total length: | | | 74:33 |

This House Is Not for Sale – Walmart (exclusive bonus tracks)
| No. | Title | Writer(s) | Length |
|---|---|---|---|
| 13. | "Real Love" | Bon Jovi; Falcon | 4:34 |
| 14. | "All Hail the King" | Bon Jovi; DeStefano; Gorley | 4:54 |
| 15. | "We Don't Ru(2016 Remix featuring Phil X)" | Bon Jovi; Shanks | 3:16 |
| 16. | "Color Me In" | Bon Jovi; Falcon | 4:02 |
| Total length: | | | 65:54 |

This House Is Not for Sale – 2018 reissue (bonus tracks)
| No. | Title | Writer(s) | Length |
|---|---|---|---|
| 13. | "When We Were Us" | Bon Jovi; Shanks | 3:34 |
| 14. | "Walls" | Bon Jovi; Shanks | 3:37 |

== Personnel ==
Personnel taken from This House Is Not for Sale CD booklet.

Bon Jovi

- Jon Bon Jovi – lead vocals
- Phil X – guitars, backing vocals
- David Bryan – keyboards, backing vocals
- Hugh McDonald – bass
- Tico Torres – drums

Additional musicians

- John Shanks – electric & acoustic guitars, programming, backing vocals, production
- Thomas Dutton – additional programming, additional keyboards on "Knockout"
- Carl Falk – additional programming on "Knockout", "Born Again Tomorrow", "Roller Coaster", and "Reunion"

Production

- Jon Bon Jovi – production
- John Shanks – production
- Paul LaMalfa – engineering
- Obie O'Brien – additional engineering
- Nate Thor Oden – recording assistant (Avatar)
- Gosha Usov – recording assistant (Electric Lady)
- Michael H. Brauer – mixing
- Steve Vealey – mix assistant
- Joe LaPorta – mastering
- Jerry Uelsmann – album cover photo
- Sandra Brummels – art direction, design

== Charts ==
=== Weekly charts ===
| Chart (2016–18) | Peak position |
|---|---|
| Argentine Albums (CAPIF) | 6 |
| Australian Albums (ARIA) | 1 |
| Austrian Albums (Ö3 Austria) | 1 |
| Belgian Albums (Ultratop Flanders) | 9 |
| Belgian Albums (Ultratop Wallonia) | 33 |
| Brazilian Albums (ABPD) | 9 |
| Canadian Albums (Billboard) | 3 |
| Czech Albums (ČNS IFPI) | 4 |
| Dutch Albums (Album Top 100) | 8 |
| Finnish Albums (Suomen virallinen lista) | 10 |
| French Albums (SNEP) | 53 |
| German Albums (Offizielle Top 100) | 3 |
| Greek Albums (IFPI) | 29 |
| Hungarian Albums (MAHASZ) | 11 |
| Irish Albums (IRMA) | 7 |
| Italian Albums (FIMI) | 6 |
| New Zealand Albums (RMNZ) | 20 |
| Polish Albums (ZPAV) | 34 |
| Portuguese Albums (AFP) | 4 |
| Scottish Albums (Official Charts) | 5 |
| Slovak Albums (ČNS IFPI) | 8 |
| Spanish Albums (Promusicae) | 2 |
| Swedish Albums (Sverigetopplistan) | 10 |
| Swiss Albums (Schweizer Hitparade) | 2 |
| UK Albums (Official Charts) | 5 |
| US Billboard 200 | 1 |
| US Top Rock Albums (Billboard) | 1 |

=== Year-end charts ===
| Chart (2016) | Position |
|---|---|
| Australian Albums (ARIA) | 71 |
| Austrian Albums (Ö3 Austria) | 49 |
| Belgian Albums (Ultratop Flanders) | 169 |
| German Albums (Offizielle Top 100) | 65 |
| Spanish Albums (PROMUSICAE) | 61 |
| Swiss Albums (Schweizer Hitparade) | 80 |
| US Top Rock Albums (Billboard) | 22 |

| Chart (2017) | Position |
|---|---|
| US Top Rock Albums (Billboard) | 83 |

== Certifications ==
| Region | Certification | Certified units/sales |
|---|---|---|
| Australia (ARIA) | Gold | 35,000^{^} |
| Austria (IFPI Austria) | Gold | 7,500^{*} |
| United Kingdom (BPI) | Silver | 60,000^{‡} |
^{*} Sales figures based on certification alone.^{^} Shipments figures based on certification alone.^{‡} Sales+streaming figures based on certification alone.

== Release history ==
| Region | Date | Format | Label | Catalog no. |
|---|---|---|---|---|
| Worldwide | November 4, 2016 | CD; digital download | Island Records | B01LNV711A |
