= When We Were Us =

Song by Bon Jovi

Single by Bon Jovi

from the album This House Is Not for Sale
- Released: February 23, 2018
- Genre: Arena rock
- Length: 3:34
- Label: Island
- Songwriter(s): Jon Bon Jovi; John Shanks
- Producer(s): Jon Bon Jovi; John Shanks

Bon Jovi singles chronology
"Born Again Tomorrow" (2016)	"When We Were Us" (2018)	"Walls" (2018)

Music video
- "When We Were Us" on YouTube

"When We Were Us" is a song by American rock band Bon Jovi from their thirteenth studio album, This House Is Not for Sale, the single Included 2018 reissue (bonus tracks). The song was written by Jon Bon Jovi and John Shanks.

== Background ==
Jon Bon Jovi told iHeartRadio:"When We Were Us" is a retrospective song for the band, who is celebrating their incredible 35 year career this year.

== Live performances ==
On February 22, 2018, Bon Jovi performed the song at Late Show With Stephen Colbert.

== Charts ==
=== Weekly charts ===
Chart (2018)	Peak position
Belgium (Ultratip Bubbling Under Wallonia)	4
US Adult Contemporary (Billboard)	11

=== Year-end charts ===
Chart (2018)	Position
US Adult Contemporary (Billboard)	27
