= This House Is Not for Sale (song) =

2016 single by Bon Jovi

Single by Bon Jovi

from the album This House Is Not for Sale
- Released: August 12, 2016
- Length: 3:36
- Label: Island
- Songwriter(s): Jon Bon Jovi; John Shanks; Billy Falcon
- Producer(s): Jon Bon Jovi; John Shanks

Bon Jovi singles chronology
| "Saturday Night Gave Me Sunday Morning" (2015) | "This House Is Not for Sale" (2016) | "Knockout" (2016) |

Music video
- "This House Is Not for Sale" on YouTube

"This House Is Not for Sale" is a song by American rock band Bon Jovi from their thirteenth studio album, This House Is Not for Sale. It was released as the album's lead single on August 12, 2016. The song was written by Jon Bon Jovi, John Shanks, and Billy Falcon, and it was produced by Bon Jovi and Shanks. Bon Jovi has said of "This House Is Not for Sale": "this song is about integrity and what we were going through these last three years. We've become even closer and, as the song says, 'this heart, this soul, this house is not for sale.'" It is the first single to feature new guitarist Phil X. The song also features the promotion of unofficial bassist Hugh McDonald to a full-time band member.

== Live performances ==
On October 5, 2016 Bon Jovi performed the song live on The Ellen DeGeneres Show.

== Music video ==
The music video for "This House Is Not for Sale" was directed by Indrani. Portions of the video were filmed in Bethlehem, Pennsylvania, and in Allentown, Pennsylvania. In the video, the house marked "for sale" is 2415 South 6th Street, in Allentown. Towards the end of the video, as the camera pans away from South 6th Street, the PPL Building is visible on the left horizon. The cemetery shots are from St. Michael's Cemetery in South Bethlehem, Pennsylvania, with closed Bethlehem Steel Plant in the background.

The music video was published on YouTube on August 12, 2016.

== Charts ==
=== Weekly charts ===
| Chart (2016) | Peak position |
|---|---|
| Australia (ARIA) | 81 |
| Austria (Ö3 Austria Top 40) | 43 |
| Finland Download (Latauslista) | 10 |
| Germany (GfK) | 85 |
| Hungary (Rádiós Top 40) | 8 |
| Hungary (Single Top 40) | 29 |
| Scotland (OCC) | 26 |
| Spain (PROMUSICAE) | 17 |
| UK Singles (Official Charts Company) | 130 |
| UK Singles Downloads (OCC) | 35 |
| US Adult Pop Airplay (Billboard) | 33 |
| US Adult Contemporary (Billboard) | 10 |
| US Hot Rock & Alternative Songs (Billboard) | 25 |

=== Year-end charts ===
| Chart (2016) | Position |
|---|---|
| US Adult Contemporary (Billboard) | 28 |

== Release history ==
| Country | Date | Format | Label |
|---|---|---|---|
| Worldwide | August 12, 2016 | Digital download | Island Records |
| United States | August 22, 2016 | Adult contemporary radio | Island Records |
