= Because We Can =

Single by Bon Jovi

from the album What About Now
- Released: January 7, 2013 (US radio); January 8, 2013 (iTunes); February 20, 2013 (CD - Japan); February 22, 2013 (CD - Europe)
- Recorded: 2012, JBJ Home Studio, NJ
- Genre: Pop-rock
- Length: 4:00 (Album version); 4:05 (Single Edit)
- Label: Island
- Songwriters: Jon Bon Jovi; Richie Sambora; Billy Falcon
- Producers: John Shanks; Bon Jovi

Bon Jovi singles chronology
"This Is Our House" (2011)	"Because We Can" (2013)	"What About Now" (2013)

Music video
- "Because We Can" on YouTube

"Because We Can" is the first single released from Bon Jovi's twelfth studio album, What About Now. The single premiered on radio on January 7, 2013. Richie Sambora characterized the new material as a compilation of "different elements"; yet reassured old fans that they will be just as pleased with the new work as they have been with the old for over 30 years.

== Commercial performance ==
As of March 20, 2013, the song has sold 83,000 copies in the US.

== Critical reception ==
"Because We Can" has received mixed reviews from critics, with critics either giving the song extremely positive or extremely negative feedback. Rick Florino of Artistdirect gave "Because We Can" a review of 5 out of 5 stars, calling the song "epic" and "invigorating" and favorably comparing it to their previous song "It's My Life". Billy Dukes of UltimateClassicRock.com reacted negatively to the song, giving it a rating of 3/10 and calling it "too damn cheery" and "mainstream", and dubbed the chorus "hackneyed". Glenn Gamboa of Newsday gave the song a rating of 3 out of 4 stars, calling the "fresh" song "distinctly-present day" and "upbeat", however unfavorably compared the song to Fun, saying that the song was "off-putting" and would not gain the band any new fans. Melinda Newman of HitFix gave the song a B− and called it "anthemic" and "populist", however stated that the song would not change anyone's opinion on the band if they did not like them to begin with. Newman called Jon Bon Jovi's vocals in the song "nasally", however stated that the song was "far better" than their 2009 song "We Weren't Born to Follow". Simon Ramsay of Stereoboard.com agreed with Newman that the song would not change anyone's opinion on the band, giving the song a rating of 3 out of 5 stars, unfavorably calling it "easily the most commercial piece of pop candy" that the band has ever done.

== Music video ==
The music video for the song, directed by Fisher Stevens, premiered on January 29, 2013. It shows the band performing at a boxing arena. There are four different versions of the video, with titles "The Original", "The Boxer: Act 1", "Astrid: Act 2" and "The Beginning: Epilogue".

== Track listing ==
Digital download
No.	Title	Writer(s)	Length
1.	"Because We Can"	Jon Bon Jovi, Richie Sambora, Billy Falcon	4:00

European CD Maxi
No.	Title	Writer(s)	Length
1.	"Because We Can"	Jon Bon Jovi, Richie Sambora, Billy Falcon	4:00
2.	"Keep the Faith" (Live at New Meadowlands Stadium 2010)	Jon Bon Jovi, Richie Sambora, Desmond Child	7:09

Japanese CD Maxi
No.	Title	Writer(s)	Length
1.	"Because We Can"	Jon Bon Jovi, Richie Sambora, Billy Falcon	4:00
2.	"Because We Can" (Instrumental)	Jon Bon Jovi, Richie Sambora, Billy Falcon	4:15
3.	"Keep the Faith" (Live at New Meadowlands Stadium 2010)	Jon Bon Jovi, Richie Sambora, Desmond Child	7:09

== Chart performance ==
=== Weekly charts ===
Chart (2013)	Peak position
Australia (ARIA)	56
Austria (Ö3 Austria Top 40)	21
Belgium (Ultratip Bubbling Under Flanders)	11
Belgium (Ultratip Bubbling Under Wallonia)	28
Canada Hot 100 (Billboard)	37
Czech Republic Airplay (ČNS IFPI)	47
Finland (The Official Finnish Download Chart)	14
Germany (GfK)	37
Hungary (Editors' Choice Top 40)	28
Iceland (Tonlist)	28
Ireland (IRMA)	55
Italy (FIMI)	37
Japan Hot 100 (Billboard)	5
Netherlands (Single Top 100)	36
Scotland Singles (OCC)	26
Slovakia Airplay (ČNS IFPI)	91
South Korea International Singles (Gaon)	33
Spain (Promusicae)	19
Spanish Airplay Chart (Promusicae)	16
Switzerland (Schweizer Hitparade)	34
UK Singles (OCC)	38
US Bubbling Under Hot 100 (Billboard)	6
US Hot Rock & Alternative Songs (Billboard)	16
US Adult Pop Airplay (Billboard)	17
US Adult Contemporary (Billboard)	15

=== Year-end charts ===
Chart (2013)	Position
Japan (Japan Hot 100)	49
US Adult Contemporary (Billboard)	38
US Hot Rock Songs (Billboard)	62

== Certifications ==
Region	Certification	Certified units/sales
Brazil (Pro-Música Brasil)	Gold	30,000^{‡}
^{‡} Sales+streaming figures based on certification alone.
