= Eryn Shewell =

American singer-songwriter

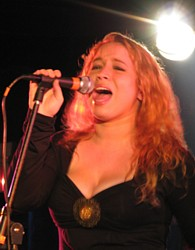
- Shewell in 2007

Background information
- Born: June 26, 1984 (age 41); Washington, D.C., US
- Origin: Jackson, New Jersey, US
- Genres: R&B, jazz, soul, blues
- Occupations: Singer-songwriter, guitarist and vocalist
- Instruments: Vocals, guitar
- Labels: Rewbie Music LLC, Therewolf Records
- Website: http://www.erynshewell.com/fr_home.cfm

Eryn Shewell (born June 26, 1984) is an American jazz and blues guitarist and vocalist from Jackson, New Jersey, United States.

== Early life ==
Eryn Shewell was born on June 26, 1984, in Washington, D.C.

== Career ==
=== Early career ===
Shewell studied music theory and voice at Jackson Memorial High School in Jackson, New Jersey. After high school, Shewell joined the New Orleans funk band The Soul Project.

=== Recent years ===
Shewell started The Eryn Shewell Band in 2006. In 2016, Shewell and her husband were inducted into the NY/NJ Blues Hall of Fame.

== Personal life ==
Shewell is married to Matt O'Ree.

== Discography ==
- Window Pane (September 9, 2008). Rewbie Music LLC
- 4th And Broadway (December 19, 2009). Rewbie Music LLC
- Children at Play (June 24, 2012). Rewbie Music LLC
- Eryn Shewell (June 2, 2013). Rewbie Music LLC
- "You Angel You" single on DYLAN : Philadelphia pays tribute to a legend 2012
- It's All Making Sense (February 2013) Alice Leon's 2013 release.
- A Day Like This (June 2012) Lily Ann Riche's debut release
- "Santa Baby" (November 2015) Belk commercial
- Brotherhood (November 2016) Matt O'Ree Band, Therewolf Records
- Pantyhose (January 2017) Kristin Rose Kelly's debut release.
- Lady E. (June 2018) Eryn Shewell.
