= Burning Bridges (Bon Jovi album) =

Studio album by Bon Jovi
- Released: August 21, 2015
- Studio: Henson (Hollywood, California); Avatar (New York, New York)
- Length: 40:22
- Label: Mercury
- Producer: John Shanks; Jon Bon Jovi

Bon Jovi chronology
What About Now (2013)	Burning Bridges (2015)	This House Is Not for Sale (2016)

Singles from Burning Bridges
- 1. "We Don't Run" Released: July 31, 2015; 2. "Saturday Night Gave Me Sunday Morning" Released: July 31, 2015

Burning Bridges is the thirteenth studio album by American rock band Bon Jovi consisting of new songs, as well as formerly unreleased and unfinished songs. Released on August 21, 2015 by Mercury Records. Produced by John Shanks, it was the first release since the departure of former guitarist Richie Sambora in 2013 (although he receives a co-writing credit on the single "Saturday Night Gave Me Sunday Morning"), with Shanks handling the lead guitar parts. Burning Bridges is their last album to be released through Mercury, marking the end of their 32-year relationship with the label. According to Jon Bon Jovi, the album serves as a "fan record" to tie in with an accompanying international tour: "It's songs that weren't finished, that were finished, a couple of new ones like the one we released as a single 'We Don't Run'." Burning Bridges was followed by This House Is Not for Sale, the band's fourteenth studio album released in 2016 which featured all new songs.

== Background ==
On November 18, 2014, in an interview with Pierre Robert from WMMR, a leading rock station in Philadelphia, lead singer Jon Bon Jovi confirmed that he started writing songs for the upcoming Bon Jovi album and that album is going to be recorded in 2015 and released in 2016. He also confirmed that lead guitarist Richie Sambora left the band and said that the doors are wide open for him if he wants to return to the band, even though it is highly unlikely. Jon said: "I’d be hard-pressed to [allow him to return], so would David, so would Tico. It’d be a lot for us [to allow him back]. After a year and a half and you miss 80 shows … I don’t think that’s possible.” By February 2015, Jon confirmed that he was still in an early stage of songwriting process with around 12 songs written and that inspiration for writing those songs came out of reading newspapers.

Burning Bridges was conceived to fulfill Bon Jovi's commitment to Mercury Records, as the band and label could not agree on adjusted terms for the band's recording contract. "I've stayed at that label my entire life—32 years. I am the longest tenured artist on Mercury, or whatever they are called this week. But my deal was up, and that's that," said Jon Bon Jovi in an interview with Billboard. The album's title track makes explicit reference to Bon Jovi's dissatisfaction with the label. According to Bon Jovi, "This hits it right in the head and tells you what happened. Listen to the lyrics because it explains exactly what happened. And that's that." Regarding the split, a representative for Mercury Records stated, "Jon is a rock 'n' roll icon, and we are so proud of his 30-year collaboration with Mercury, which brought extraordinary commercial and creative success. We wish Jon only the best."

=== Additional information ===
Burning Bridges is the first album without guitarist Richie Sambora who left the band in 2013. It is also the first album in 29 years to not feature a credit by Desmond Child, who has co-written or produced at least one song on every Bon Jovi album since 1986's Slippery When Wet.

== Reception ==
Professional ratings
Review scores
Source	Rating
AllMusic	1.5/5 stars
Asbury Park Press	Positive
Milwaukee Journal Sentinel	Mixed
Newsday	B-
The National	2/5 stars

Steven Thomas Erlewine from Allmusic gave the album 1.5 stars out of 5 by saying that "'fan album' not only sounds kinder, it also identifies precisely the audience that would be interested in this brief, power ballad-heavy collection". Chris Jordan from Asbury Park Press gave a positive review stating that "the new album from Bon Jovi, features a spark of anger from frontman Jon Bon Jovi". Jon M. Gilbertson from Milwaukee Journal Sentinel gave mixed review stating that "Artistically, it represents Bon Jovi's transformation from 1980s hair-metal act to 2015 adult-contemporary act. Sub-Springsteen working-class references, spiritually patriotic clichés and foursquare, bombastic riffs abound". Glenn Gamboa from Newsday rated the album with B− stating that "'Burning Bridges' does sound a bit, well, burned-out". Rob Garratt from The National gave the album 2 stars out of 5 by saying "new album offers little more than a fresh excuse to refill the coffers and add a few more set fillers to a multimillion-dollar touring juggernaut that is still dining out on 1980s anthems".

The album debuted at No. 13 on Billboard, and No. 3 on Rock Albums on its release, selling 19,000 copies in the first week. The album has sold 67,000 copies in the United States as of August 2016.

== Promotion ==
The album features twin lead singles, "We Don't Run" and "Saturday Night Gave Me Sunday Morning", both released on July 31, 2015. Saturday Night Gave Me Sunday Morning premiered on Hitradio Ö3 on July 17, 2015. at 9:45 a.m. Originally written in The Circle sessions, it was finished for this album. Three days later, on July 20, 2015, Brazilian radio station "Radio Rock" premiered "We Don't Run". Though not released as singles, the songs "Blind Love" and "A Teardrop to the Sea" were digitally released on August 7, 2015, followed by "I'm Your Man" on August 13, 2015. Lyrics videos for all the songs have been released on Bon Jovi's YouTube account.

== Track listing ==
No.	Title	Writer(s)	Length
1.	"A Teardrop to the Sea"	Jon Bon Jovi; Billy Falcon	5:08
2.	"We Don't Run"	Bon Jovi; John Shanks	3:19
3.	"Saturday Night Gave Me Sunday Morning"	Bon Jovi; Richie Sambora; Shanks	3:23
4.	"We All Fall Down"	Bon Jovi	4:04
5.	"Blind Love"	Bon Jovi; Shanks	4:47
6.	"Who Would You Die For?"	Bon Jovi; Falcon	3:54
7.	"Fingerprints"	Bon Jovi; Falcon	5:59
8.	"Life Is Beautiful"	Bon Jovi; Falcon; Chris DeStefano	3:22
9.	"I'm Your Man"	Bon Jovi	3:44
10.	"Burning Bridges"	Bon Jovi; Shanks	2:44
Total length:			40:22

Japanese/Walmart deluxe edition
No.	Title	Writer(s)	Length
11.	"Take Back the Night"	Bon Jovi; Shanks	3:42
Total length:			44:04

== Personnel ==
Bon Jovi (Note: Adapted from album liner notes on Bonjovi.com.)

- Jon Bon Jovi – lead vocals, acoustic guitar
- David Bryan – keyboards, piano, backing vocals
- Tico Torres – drums

Additional Personnel

- Hugh McDonald – bass
- John Shanks – guitars, backing vocals
- Lorenza Ponce – string arrangements and viola/violin/cello (track 5)
- Mike Rew – rhythm guitar, backing vocals (track 10)

Production

- John Shanks, Jon Bon Jovi – Producers
- Paul LaMalfa – Mixing and Recording
- Phil Nicolo – Mastering
- Nathan Odden – Recording Assistant
- Dan Tatarowicz – Mastering Assistant
- Avatar Studios, Henson Studios – Studio

== Charts ==
=== Weekly charts ===
Chart (2015)	Peak position
Argentine Albums (CAPIF)	5
Australian Albums (ARIA)	3
Austrian Albums (Ö3 Austria)	1
Belgian Albums (Ultratop Flanders)	11
Belgian Albums (Ultratop Wallonia)	17
Canadian Albums (Billboard)	4
Croatian International Albums (HDU)	1
Czech Albums (ČNS IFPI)	4
Dutch Albums (Album Top 100)	2
Finnish Albums (Suomen virallinen lista)	9
French Albums (SNEP)	73
Greek Albums (IFPI)	12
German Albums (Offizielle Top 100)	1
Hungarian Albums (MAHASZ)	25
Irish Albums (IRMA)	13
Italian Albums (FIMI)	3
New Zealand Albums (RMNZ)	19
Portuguese Albums (AFP)	6
South Korean Albums (Circle)	46
Scottish Albums (OCC)	2
Spanish Albums (Promusicae)	1
Swedish Albums (Sverigetopplistan)	25
Swiss Albums (Schweizer Hitparade)	2
UK Albums (OCC)	3
US Billboard 200	13
US Top Rock Albums (Billboard)	3

=== Year-end charts ===
Chart (2015)	Position
Austrian Albums (Ö3 Austria)	52
Swiss Albums (Schweizer Hitparade)	84

== Certifications ==
Region	Certification	Certified units/sales
Austria (IFPI Austria)	Gold	7,500^{*}
^{*} Sales figures based on certification alone.

== Release history ==
Region	Date	Format	Label	Ref.
Worldwide	August 21, 2015	CD; digital download	Mercury; Island; Virgin EMI; Universal	
