= What About Now (album) =

Studio album by Bon Jovi
- Released: March 8, 2013
- Recorded: January–August 2012
- Genre: Pop rock
- Length: 51:36
- Labels: Island; Mercury
- Producers: John Shanks; Jon Bon Jovi; Richie Sambora

Bon Jovi chronology
Inside Out (2012)	What About Now (2013)	Burning Bridges (2015)

Singles from What About Now
- 1. "Because We Can" Released: January 7, 2013; 2. "What About Now" Released: February 11, 2013

What About Now is the twelfth studio album by American rock band Bon Jovi. Produced by John Shanks, the album was released on March 8, 2013 in Australia and March 12, 2013 in the United States. The album was promoted throughout the band's 2013 Because We Can: The Tour. It is the last album to feature lead guitarist Richie Sambora before his departure from the band the following month.

The album debuted at No. 1 in the U.S., where it sold 101,000 copies in its first week. What About Now became Bon Jovi's third album in a row to hit No. 1 in US after The Circle and Lost Highway and their fifth No. 1 album during their career.

== Recording and production ==
In an interview given to Classic Rock magazine, guitarist Richie Sambora stated that the album was recorded before his solo album Aftermath of the Lowdown was completed. He and Jon started to write and before they knew it, they were in the studio with the band. "The record is now finished and sounding great, and we start our 2013 tour in February, so we'll be at a stadium near you very soon."

Richie Sambora also characterized the new material as a compilation of “different elements”; yet reassured old fans that they will be just as pleased with the new work as they have been with the old for over 30 years.

Music videos were produced for the first two singles "Because We Can" and the album titled track "What About Now". A music video was also made for the Jon Bon Jovi solo single "Not Running Anymore" which is included on the album as a bonus track along with the track "Old Habits Die Hard". Both songs feature on the soundtrack to the movie Stand Up Guys. On December 13, 2012 it was announced that "Not Running Anymore" would be nominated for a Golden Globe Award.

Also included as a bonus track and featuring a music video is Sambora's single "Every Road Leads Home to You" from his solo album Aftermath of the Lowdown.

== Artwork ==
The album artwork was created by Liu Bolin and was revealed on January 10, 2013, three days after the release of lead single "Because We Can". The cover artwork features the four members of the band painted behind a collage which features a soldier with a guitar and walking up a mountain against a yellow and blue American flag background, two hands wrapped in bandages, a headshot of a woman, some roses, and the band's heart and dagger symbol. A pinwheel is also seen in the background. The cover artwork is also seen on the back, though the collage has more pictures to it and the band members are absent.

== Reception ==
Professional ratings
Aggregate scores
Source	Rating
Metacritic	50/100
Review scores
Source	Rating
Allmusic	2/5 stars
Daily Express	2/5 stars
The Guardian	3/5 stars
The Observer	2/5 stars
Time Out	2/5 stars
Virgin Media	3/5 stars
Rolling Stone	3/5 stars
NU.nl	3/5 stars

Critical reception of the album has been generally mixed. At Metacritic, which assigns a normalized rating out of 100 to reviews from critics, the album received an average score of 50, which indicates "mixed or average reviews", based on 11 reviews. While Caroline Sullivan from The Guardian states that "the band have reached out with the sort of empowering platitudes and riffage that will give fans on this summer's stadium tour something to punch the air about", Stephen Unwin from the Daily Express was less favorable, claiming that the album "is the closest thing to predictable from the poster boys of American rock ’n’ roll, which for their most myopic fans is the closest thing to wonderful."

Phil Mongrendien, from the Toronto Star, criticized the track "Army of One" for finding them "descending into lyrical self-parody with its 'never give up' motif hammered home artlessly" while the title track's guitar "hook nods too much to Kraftwerk's 'Computer Love' (and, by extension, Coldplay's 'Talk')". James Manning, from Time Out, believes that the band "won't win any new fans with their twelfth album [...] but they're unlikely to lose many either."

Ian Gittins, from Virgin Media, thought "the band's perennial propensity for clichés and Hollywood blockbuster-style happy endings invariably make it difficult to take Bon Jovi as seriously as they crave", though he later admits that "there are some good tunes. It's a decent soft rock party album. It's probably also about time that Bon Jovi knew their limits." For Stephen Erlewine, from Allmusic, "there aren't so many big hooks on What About Now -- just the raise-your-fist anthem of 'Because We Can,' with most of the sweetest melodies coming from the softer, quieter moments, such as the acoustic 'The Fighter' and the Christian ballad 'Room at the End of the World'.

Ultimate Classic Rock said it was Bon Jovi's worst album in 2025, calling it "an album of milquetoast, adult-contemporary pop-rock and lyrical platitudes, with none of the fiery riffs or stadium-sized hooks of the band’s heyday."

== Track listing ==
Standard edition
No.	Title	Writer(s)	Length
1.	"Because We Can"	Jon Bon Jovi; Richie Sambora; Billy Falcon	4:00
2.	"I'm with You"	Bon Jovi; John Shanks	3:44
3.	"What About Now"	Bon Jovi; Shanks	3:45
4.	"Pictures of You"	Bon Jovi; Sambora; Shanks	3:58
5.	"Amen"	Bon Jovi; Falcon	4:12
6.	"That's What the Water Made Me"	Bon Jovi; Falcon	4:24
7.	"What's Left of Me"	Bon Jovi; Sambora; Falcon	4:35
8.	"Army of One"	Bon Jovi; Sambora; Desmond Child	4:34
9.	"Thick as Thieves"	Bon Jovi; Sambora; John Shanks	4:57
10.	"Beautiful World"	Bon Jovi; Falcon	3:48
11.	"Room at the End of the World"	Bon Jovi; Shanks	5:03
12.	"The Fighter"	Bon Jovi	4:38
Total length:			51:36

Deluxe edition/iTunes standard edition bonus tracks
No.	Title	Writer(s)	Length
13.	"With These Two Hands"	Bon Jovi; Falcon	3:58
14.	"Into the Echo"	Bon Jovi; Falcon	5:04
15.	"Not Running Anymore" (Jon Bon Jovi solo song from the soundtrack for the film Stand Up Guys)	Bon Jovi	4:44
Total length:			64:41

Japanese edition bonus tracks
No.	Title	Writer(s)	Length
13.	"With These Two Hands"	Bon Jovi; Falcon	3:58
14.	"Into the Echo"	Bon Jovi; Falcon	5:04
15.	"Not Running Anymore"	Bon Jovi	4:44
16.	"Old Habits Die Hard" (Jon Bon Jovi solo song from the soundtrack for the film Stand Up Guys)	Bon Jovi	3:30
17.	"Every Road Leads Home to You" (Richie Sambora solo song from his album Aftermath of the Lowdown)	Sambora; Luke Ebbin	4:40
Total length:			73:36

Japan bonus DVD
No.	Title	Length
1.	"Because We Can" (music video)
2.	"Because We Can – The Boxer: Act 1"
3.	"Because We Can – Astrid: Act 2"
4.	"Because We Can – The Beginning: Epilogue"
5.	"Because We Can – Behind the Scenes"
6.	"It's My Life" (Inside Out: live)
7.	"Lost Highway" (Inside Out: live)

iTunes Store deluxe edition/Australian deluxe edition bonus tracks
No.	Title	Writer(s)	Length
13.	"With These Two Hands"	Bon Jovi; Falcon	3:58
14.	"Not Running Anymore"	Bon Jovi	4:44
15.	"Old Habits Die Hard"	Bon Jovi	3:30
16.	"Every Road Leads Home to You"	Sambora; Ebbin	4:40
Total length:			68:32

== Personnel ==
Bon Jovi

- Jon Bon Jovi – lead vocals
- Richie Sambora – guitars, backing vocals
- David Bryan – keyboards, backing vocals
- Tico Torres – drums

Additional personnel

- Hugh McDonald – bass
- John Shanks – guitars, producer
- David Campbell – string arranger & conductor

== Charts ==
=== Weekly charts ===
Chart (2013)	Peak position
Argentinian Albums (CAPIF)	7
Australian Albums (ARIA)	1
Austrian Albums (Ö3 Austria)	1
Belgian Albums (Ultratop Flanders)	8
Belgian Albums (Ultratop Wallonia)	16
Canadian Albums (Billboard)	1
Danish Albums (Hitlisten)	6
Dutch Albums (Album Top 100)	2
Finnish Albums (Suomen virallinen lista)	3
French Albums (SNEP)	46
German Albums (Offizielle Top 100)	2
Greek Albums (IFPI)	10
Hungarian Albums (MAHASZ)	4
Irish Albums (IRMA)	3
Italian Albums (FIMI)	5
Japanese Albums (Oricon)	2
Mexican Albums (Top 100 Mexico)	16
New Zealand Albums (RMNZ)	9
Norwegian Albums (VG-lista)	2
Portuguese Albums (AFP)	2
Scottish Albums (Official Charts)	2
South African Albums (RISA)	8
Spanish Albums (Promusicae)	1
Swedish Albums (Sverigetopplistan)	1
Swiss Albums (Schweizer Hitparade)	3
UK Albums (Official Charts)	2
US Billboard 200	1
US Digital Albums (Billboard)	2
US Indie Store Album Sales (Billboard)	7
US Top Rock Albums (Billboard)	1

=== Year-end charts ===
Chart (2013)	Position
Australian Albums (ARIA)	58
Austrian Albums (Ö3 Austria)	22
Belgian Albums (Ultratop Flanders)	132
German Albums (Offizielle Top 100)	57
Hungarian Albums (MAHASZ)	96
Japanese albums (Oricon)	85
Spanish Albums (PROMUSICAE)	32
Swedish Albums (Sverigetopplistan)	72
Swiss Albums (Schweizer Hitparade)	53
UK Albums (OCC)	107
US Billboard 200	138
US Top Rock Albums (Billboard)	32

== Certifications ==
Certifications for What About Now
Region	Certification	Certified units/sales
Australia (ARIA)	Gold	35,000^{^}
Austria (IFPI Austria)	Platinum	15,000^{*}
Canada (Music Canada)	Gold	40,000^{^}
Germany (BVMI)	Gold	100,000^{^}
Portugal (AFP)	6× Platinum	90,000^{^}
United Kingdom (BPI)	Gold	100,000^{*}
^{*} Sales figures based on certification alone.^{^} Shipments figures based on certification alone.

== Release history ==
Country	Date	Label	Format
Australia	March 8, 2013	Universal Music	CD, CD+DVD, Digital download
Brazil	March 8, 2013	Universal Music	CD, CD+DVD, Digital download
Germany	March 8, 2013	Universal Music	CD, CD+DVD, Digital download
United Kingdom	March 8, 2013	Universal Music	CD, CD+DVD, Digital download
Ireland	March 8, 2013	Mercury Records	CD, CD+DVD, Digital download
France	March 8, 2013	Mercury Records, Universal Music	CD, CD+DVD, Digital download
United States	March 12, 2013	Island Records	CD, CD+DVD, Digital download
Italy	March 12, 2013	Island Records	CD, CD+DVD, Digital download
Spain	March 12, 2013	Island Records	CD, CD+DVD, Digital download
Canada	March 12, 2013	Universal Music	CD, CD+DVD, Digital download
Japan	March 13, 2013	Universal Music	CD, CD+DVD, Digital download
