= Tico Torres =

American drummer

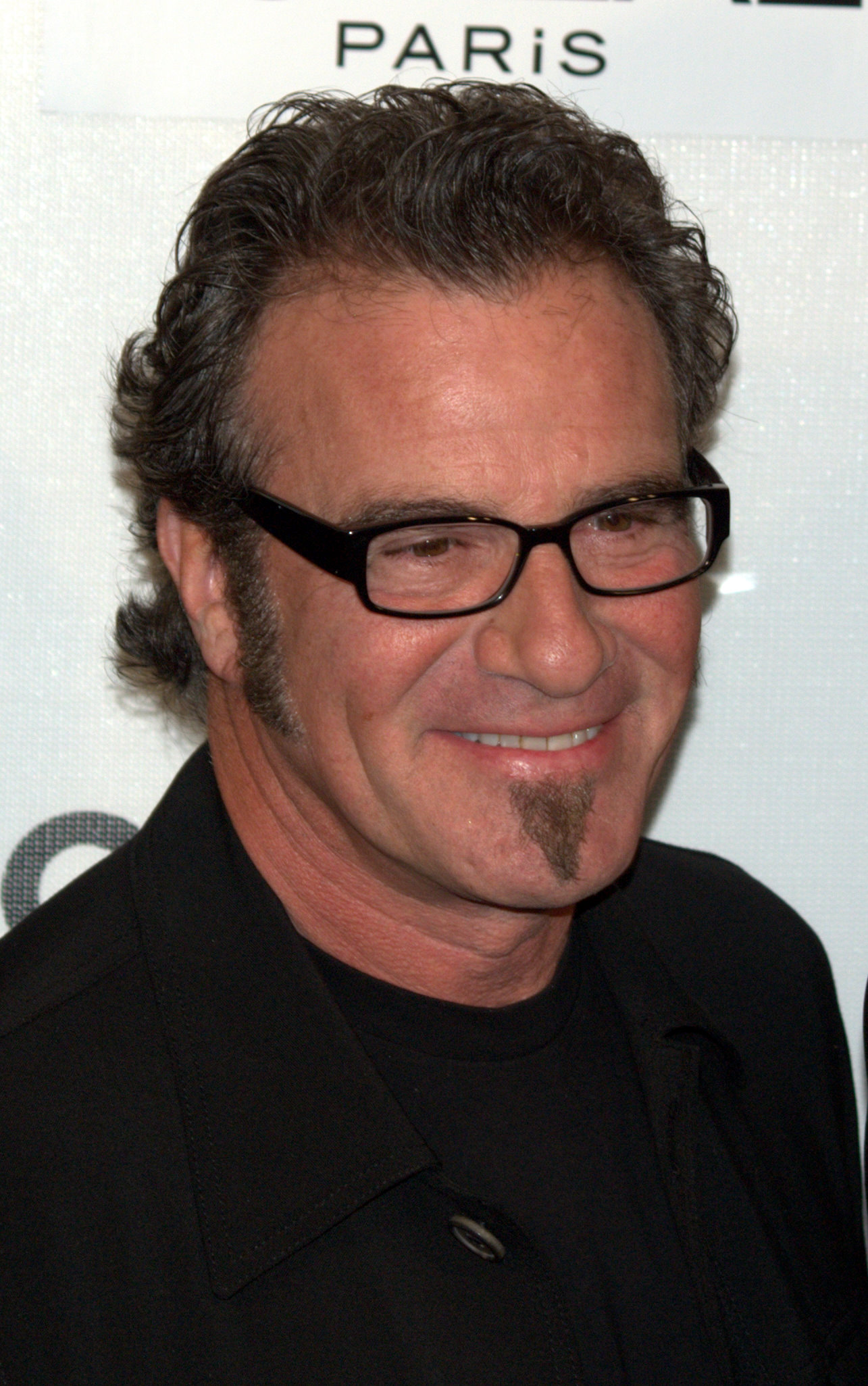
- Torres in 2009

Background information
- Also known as: Tico, The Hitman
- Born: Hector Samuel Juan Torres; October 7, 1953 (age 72); New York City, U.S.
- Genres: Hard rock; glam metal; arena rock; pop rock; jazz fusion; blues
- Occupation: Musician
- Instruments: Drums
- Years active: 1969–present
- Member of: Bon Jovi
- Formerly of: T. Roth and Another Pretty Face; Franke and the Knockouts

Hector Samuel Juan "Tico" Torres (born October 7, 1953) is an American musician, best known as the drummer and one of the founding members of the rock band Bon Jovi. In 2018, he was inducted into the Rock and Roll Hall of Fame as a member of Bon Jovi.

== Childhood ==
Héctor Samuel Juan Torres was born on October 7, 1953, in New York City, and brought up in the Colonia section of Woodbridge Township, New Jersey. His parents, Emma and Héctor, emigrated from Cuba in 1948. He is fluent in Spanish in addition to English. Torres attended John F. Kennedy Memorial High School in Iselin.

== Music career ==
Torres was a jazz fan as a youth and studied music with Joe Morello. In 1969, he played drums for the psychedelic rock band Six Feet Under. Before joining Bon Jovi in 1983, Torres had already played live with Joe Cerisano's R-Band a.k.a. Silver Condor in the New Jersey Rock circuit. Torres was also one of the drummers auditioned by Kiss in 1980 after original drummer Peter Criss left the band.

Torres was the original drummer for the glam rock band T. Roth and Another Pretty Face and played on their 1980 album Face Facts.

=== Bon Jovi ===
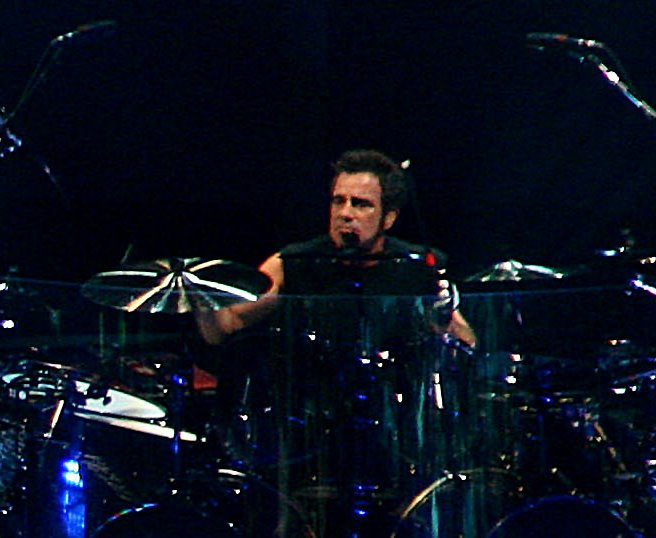
Torres live with Bon Jovi in 2007

Torres met Alec John Such while playing with a band called Phantom's Opera, and it was this friendship that led to him joining Bon Jovi. When Jon Bon Jovi, the lead singer of the band, approached Torres, he was put off by the fact that Jon was 9 years younger than he was. He said it was Jon's charismatic appearance and watching him perform that attracted him to join the band.

Known as "The Hitman," Torres is primarily a drummer and percussionist, but he sang lead vocals on a song on the box set 100,000,000 Bon Jovi Fans Can't Be Wrong, as well as backing vocals on a couple of the early Bon Jovi tracks, notably "Born to Be My Baby" and "Love for Sale".

== Other work ==
Aside from his success as a drummer, Torres discovered another talent: painting. He has exhibited his art since 1994. The successful first show was at the Ambassador Galleries in Soho, New York. Torres is a self-taught painter, who paints expressive pictures which show scenes from everyday life and his life with the band.

His painting talent was shown in one of the three videos made for the single "Who Says You Can't Go Home."

Torres also owns a fashion line for babies called Rock Star Baby.

== Personal life ==
Torres and his first wife divorced soon after the formation of Bon Jovi in 1983. In 1996, Torres married Czech-born model Eva Herzigová in Sea Bright, New Jersey. Their marriage ended two years later. Torres married Maria Alejandra in September 2001, his third marriage; they divorced in 2008. They have a son, born on January 9, 2004.

When the Bon Jovi What About Now tour reached Mexico on September 10, 2013, Torres experienced severe abdominal pains and was rushed to the hospital with appendicitis. About two weeks later, on September 22, 2013, he was hospitalized a second time for emergency gall bladder surgery. Rich Scannella filled in for him, and Torres returned to the tour in Fresno, California, on October 8, 2013, one day after his 60th birthday.

Torres is an avid golfer who frequently participates in the Alfred Dunhill Links Pro-Am in St. Andrews, UK, often playing in a foursome with fellow musician and good friend Huey Lewis.

== Discography ==
=== Bon Jovi ===
Studio albums

- Bon Jovi (1984)
- 7800° Fahrenheit (1985)
- Slippery When Wet (1986)
- New Jersey (1988)
- Keep the Faith (1992)
- These Days (1995)
- Crush (2000)
- Bounce (2002)
- Have a Nice Day (2005)
- Lost Highway (2007)
- The Circle (2009)
- What About Now (2013)
- Burning Bridges (2015)
- This House Is Not for Sale (2016)
- 2020 (2020)
- Forever (2024)

Compilation albums

- Hard & Hot (1991)
- Cross Road (1994)
- Tokyo Road: Best of Bon Jovi (2001)
- This Left Feels Right (2003)
- Greatest Hits (2010)

Live albums

- One Wild Night Live 1985–2001 (2001)
- Inside Out (2012)
- This House Is Not for Sale – Live from the London Palladium (2016)

Box sets

- 100,000,000 Bon Jovi Fans Can't Be Wrong (2004) (With on disc three, track three "Only in My Dreams" (featuring Tico Torres on vocals; Unreleased demo, 1994)

=== Richie Sambora ===
- Stranger in This Town (1991)

=== T. Roth and Another Pretty Face ===
- Face Facts (1980)
