= Phil X =

Canadian rock guitarist

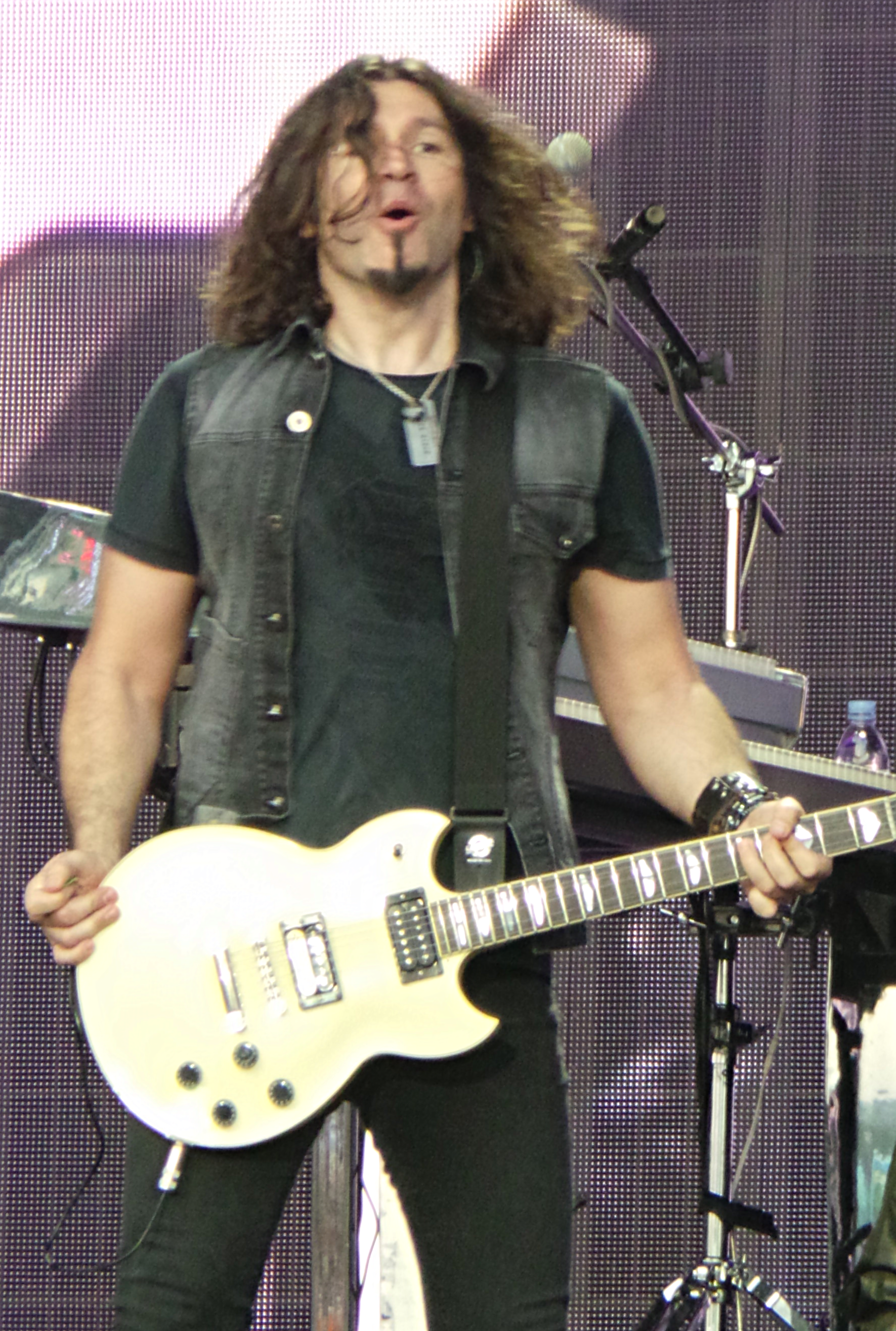
- Phil X performing in 2013

Background information
- Born: Theofilos Xenidis; March 10, 1966 (age 60); Toronto, Ontario, Canada
- Genres: Rock; hard rock; heavy metal; glam metal
- Occupation: Musician
- Instrument: Guitar
- Years active: 1982–present
- Member of: Bon Jovi, Phil X & The Drills
- Formerly of: Triumph, Powder, Methods of Mayhem, Frozen Ghost
- Website: philx.tv

Theofilos Xenidis (born March 10, 1966), better known as Phil X, is a Canadian musician. Since 2013, he has played lead guitar with Bon Jovi and officially replaced former lead guitarist Richie Sambora in 2016.

== Career ==
=== Early bands and session work (1982–2010) ===
In 1982, Xenidis formed the hard rock-heavy metal band Sidinex (naming it after himself, the moniker being his last name spelled backwards) with singer Todd Farhood, bassist Kevin Gingrinch and drummer Scott Masterson. The band released only one EP in 1985, Forever Young, before changing name to Flip City in 1987 and disbanding soon after. An opportunity in Xenidis' career came when he was asked in 1990 to tour with Randy Coven, whom he met through Aldo Nova; in 1991, he toured the US with Aldo Nova. From 1992 to 1993 he played with Triumph, recording Edge of Excess and touring with them.

In 1994, Xenidis collaborated with Doug Varty, Terry Brown, Geoffrey Dahl, Randall Coryell, Rob Kennedy, Brian Doerner and others to form a short lived band, The Bushdoctors, in Mississauga, Ontario. They recorded one album, a self-titled debut, now out of print. Also in 1994 he played a guitar solo for Our Lady Peace's song "Denied" from the album Naveed. Phil X was guitarist for US power pop band Powder alongside vocalist and then-wife Ninette Terhart. The band released three albums between 2002 and 2008.

=== Bon Jovi (2011–present) ===
In 2011, Phil X substituted for Bon Jovi's lead guitarist Richie Sambora, who missed 13 dates after entering rehab, and later filled in for Sambora on the US and Europe leg of the 2013 tour after Sambora left the band suddenly for personal reasons. Arman Ghasemi, a mutual friend of Jon Bon Jovi and Phil X, recommended Phil as a substitute.

In mid-2013 he filled in for Sambora during a number of dates of the Because We Can tour, including their only Italian date in Milan, the entire British leg of the tour including the Isle of Wight Festival, Hyde Park BST dates, the South African leg, the South American leg, and the Australian leg. In 2016, Phil X became an official member in the band along with bass guitarist Hugh McDonald and also features as guitarist for the band on their single "This House Is Not for Sale" on the album of the same name as well as their latest studio effort Bon Jovi: 2020. In 2019, Phil X was inducted into the Mississauga Music Walk of Fame, which recognizes notable people with musical talent that have their roots in the Ontario city.

In 2016, he appeared in the documentary Hired Gun, a film about session musicians.

As of 2026 Phil X is touring with Triumph on their Rock & Roll Machine Reloaded 50th Anniversary Tour.

== Personal life ==
Phil X was born to Greek-Canadian parents and grew up in Mississauga, Ontario, raised in the Erindale subdivision. Phil's first marriage was to vocalist Ninette Terhart while they were both members of the group Powder which broke up in 2010. In 2013, Phil married Lindy Green and has two children with her.

== Equipment ==
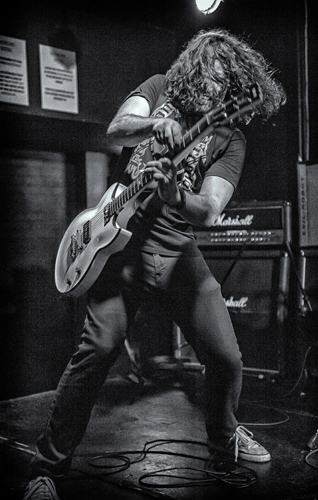
Phil X performing in 2013

=== Guitars ===
Phil X has used many guitars during his session and live work. He prefers bridge pickups and often removes the neck pickup from his personal guitars for added vibration, clarity and harmonics. For humorous effect, he will usually place an action figure and fan grille in the pickup cavity. He also favors P-90 pickups due to their tonal flexibility; their tone can be cleaned up on an overdriven amp by simply lowering the volume on the guitar.

His most notable guitar is his ESP LTD Viper, which he refers to as the "sticker guitar". This guitar originally had a Seymour Duncan JB pickup and later a Gibson P-94, but it has since been replaced with an Arcane PX-100.

In 2012, Phil X received a signature guitar from Yamaha, in 2015 followed the release of a signature XG model made by Framus. Phil invented the "Flip Stick", a specially modified replacement for the usual whammy bar on Floyd-Rose-equipped guitars. He endorses Cleartone Treated Guitar Strings and Everly Star Picks as well. His demonstrations of rare and vintage guitars have had over 30 million views on the frettedamericana YouTube channel.

In 2019, Phil X became a Gibson artist.

=== Amplification ===
Phil X also uses Friedman amplification. He has his own signature amplifier, the Friedman X.

=== Pickups ===
Phil X has four custom pickups which he designed in conjunction with pickup manufacturer Arcane, Inc. They are available for sale on his official website:

- PX-90: A P-90 pickup wound to Phil X's specs. It is his preferred pickup and is used in a majority of his guitars.
- PX-100: The same pickup as the PX-90, but made in a humbucker case as a drop-in replacement for humbucker equipped guitars.
- PX-8: A humbucker wound to vintage specs, but uses Alnico 8 magnets for extra output.
- PX-SUPER 8: Also uses Alnico 8 magnets, but is wound hotter for high-gain use.

== Discography ==
Phil X is a prolific session guitarist, having played on albums by Chris Cornell, Tommy Lee, Methods of Mayhem, Avril Lavigne, Kelly Clarkson, Orianthi, Rob Zombie, Chris Daughtry, Alice Cooper, Thousand Foot Krutch and many others. He wrote the song "Tired" and also played guitar on Tommy Lee's Tommyland: The Ride album. He has appeared with Tommy Lee and Bon Jovi on Ellen and The Tonight Show with Jay Leno. Phil X was featured in the "making of" bonus features for the movie Josie and the Pussycats. He acted as a music coach for the film and taught the young actresses to appear as if they were actually playing their instruments. The following is a list of Phil X's discography as a band member, apart from his session work.

with Triumph

- Edge of Excess (1992)

with The Bushdoctors

- The Bushdoctors (1994)

with Powder

- Sonic Machine (2002)
- Powder (2005)
- Nothing (2008)

with Phil X & The Drills

- Kick Your Ass in 17 Minutes. (2009)
- We Bring the Rock N Roll (2011)
- We Play Instruments N Sh!t (2012)
- Stupid Good Lookings Vol.1 (2019)

with Bon Jovi

- This House Is Not for Sale (2016)
- 2020 (2020)
- Forever (2024)

=== Session work ===
The following is a complete official list of the rest of Phil X's work.

- Nice Place to Visit (1988) by Frozen Ghost
- Two Rooms: Celebrating the Songs of Elton John & Bernie Taupin (1991)
- Shake Your Spirit (1992) by Frozen Ghost
- Naveed (1994) by Our Lady Peace (solo on "Denied")
- Methods of Mayhem (1999) by Methods of Mayhem
- Brutal Planet (2000) by Alice Cooper
- Movement in Still Life (1999) by BT
- Music from and Inspired by M:I-2 (2000) (on "Scum of the Earth" by Rob Zombie)
- I Get Wet (2001) by Andrew W.K.
- The Sinister Urge (2001) by Rob Zombie
- Never a Dull Moment (2002) by Tommy Lee
- Emotional Technology (2003) by BT (on "Superfabulous")
- House of 1000 Corpses - Original Motion Picture Soundtrack (2003)
- We're a Happy Family: A Tribute to Ramones (2003) (on "Blitzkrieg Bop" by Rob Zombie)
- Under My Skin (2004) by Avril Lavigne (on "He Wasn't" & "How Does It Feel")
- Day of Fire (2004) by Day of Fire
- Breakaway (2004) by Kelly Clarkson (on "Where Is Your Heart" & "Walk Away")
- The Art of Breaking (2005) by Thousand Foot Krutch
- Tommyland: The Ride (2005) by Tommy Lee
- Daughtry (2006) by Daughtry
- The Day Has Come (2006) by Cheyenne Kimball (on "Hanging On" & "Mr. Beautiful")
- Devils & Angels (2007) by Mêlée
- The Flame in All of Us (2007) by Thousand Foot Krutch
- Worlds Collide (2007) by Apocalyptica (on "I Don't Care")
- The Stewart Copeland Anthology (2007) by Stewart Copeland on "Big Drum Tribe"
- Gavin DeGraw (2008) by Gavin DeGraw
- Scars & Souvenirs (2008) by Theory of a Deadman (background vocals)
- Patience (2008) by Nick Lachey
- Halestorm (2009) by Halestorm (additional guitar solos)
- Believe (2009) by Orianthi (rhythm guitar)
- Last Train Home (2009) by Ryan Star
- Leave This Town (2009) by Daughtry (additional guitars)
- Scream (2009) by Chris Cornell (on "Long Gone [Rock Version]")
- All I Ever Wanted (2009) by Kelly Clarkson (on "I Do Not Hook Up", "Cry", & "Don't Let Me Stop You")
- Just Like You (2009) by Allison Iraheta (on "Don't Waste the Pretty" & "Don't Wanna Be Wrong")
- For Your Entertainment (2009) by Adam Lambert (on "Aftermath")
- Utada Hikaru Single Collection Vol. 2 (2010) by Hikaru Utada (on "Show Me Love (Not a Dream)")
- Five (2011) by Ayumi Hamasaki (on "Progress")
- Sunday Love (2012) by Fefe Dobson (on "Don't Let It Go to Your Head" & "This Is My Life")
- The Strange Case Of... (2012) by Halestorm (additional guitars)
- EvoLucie (2018) by Lucie (band) (guitar solo on the song „Nejlepší, kterou znám")
- "Work Hard, Rock Hard" (2021) by Kurt Deimer(songwriting and guitar)
