= The Circle Tour =

2010 concert tour by Bon Jovi

- World tour by Bon Jovi
- Promotional poster for 2010 São Paulo concert
- Location: North America, Europe, South America, Asia, Oceania
- Associated album: The Circle
- Start date: February 11, 2010
- End date: December 19, 2010
- Legs: 6
- No. of shows: 52 in North America; 15 in Europe; 7 in Latin America; 9 in Oceania; 2 in Asia; 85 in total
- Box office: US $201.1 million ($296.91 in 2025 dollars)

Bon Jovi concert chronology
- Lost Highway Tour (2007-08); The Circle Tour (2010); Bon Jovi Live (2011)

The Circle Tour was a worldwide concert tour in 2010 by American rock band Bon Jovi to promote their 11th studio album The Circle (2009). The tour started in North America and progressed to Europe, South America, Asia and Australia. It included a 12-night run at the O2 Arena in London and four nights in East Rutherford, New Jersey to celebrate the opening of the Meadowlands Stadium. The tour was the #1 top-grossing concert tour for 2010 in the world.

Bon Jovi also played a free performance for fans and former season ticket holders of the Jon Bon Jovi-owned arena football team The Philadelphia Soul on March 24, 2010, a few hours before the band's show at Philadelphia's Wachovia Center. The band ended the first year of the tour in Australasia, playing two shows in New Zealand and eight shows in Australia.

== Background ==
Bon Jovi started the stadium leg of the 2010 Circle Tour by playing the inaugural show at the New Meadowlands Stadium in East Rutherford, New Jersey. Three sold-out shows on May 26, 27, and 29 prompted the addition of another tour date at the venue at the start of the second North American leg on July 9.

The band played a free performance for fans and former season ticket holders of the Jon Bon Jovi-owned arena football team The Philadelphia Soul on March 24, a few hours before the band's show at Philadelphia's Wachovia Center. On June 7 they became the first band to play on the roof of the O_{2} Arena in London, England. The performance was shown outside on a large screen with a PA system. Trained mountaineers helped the group to reach the top of the roof, which was 58 meters above the ground.

The tour featured a circle-shaped stage with five large robots, choreographed to move with the music and onstage production, which each had a 6' by 9' Nocturne/ Vidicon LED screen attached to their articulated arms. They were provided by RoboScreen and designed by Andy Flessas.

== Opening acts ==
Bon Jovi held a contest, called SuperBAND Tonight, in which North American bands competed for a chance to perform as their opening act at some of the concerts. The winners were announced in a press release. More information can be found at: Bon Jovi's The Circle Tour Announces Winners of Contest.

- Dashboard Confessional supported the February, March, and some of the April dates.
- Fuel supported the Hersheypark Stadium show on May 19
- Kid Rock supported the O2 Arena shows on June 22, 23, 25 and 26.
- OneRepublic supported the O2 Arena shows on June 17, 19 and 20.
- Kid Rock supported on July 9, 15, 17, 20, 21, 24, 28, 30 and 31.
- Train was the special guest on the first night at the Meadowlands Stadium. Gavin DeGraw was the special guest for the second night, and OneRepublic was the special guest on the third.

== Setlist ==
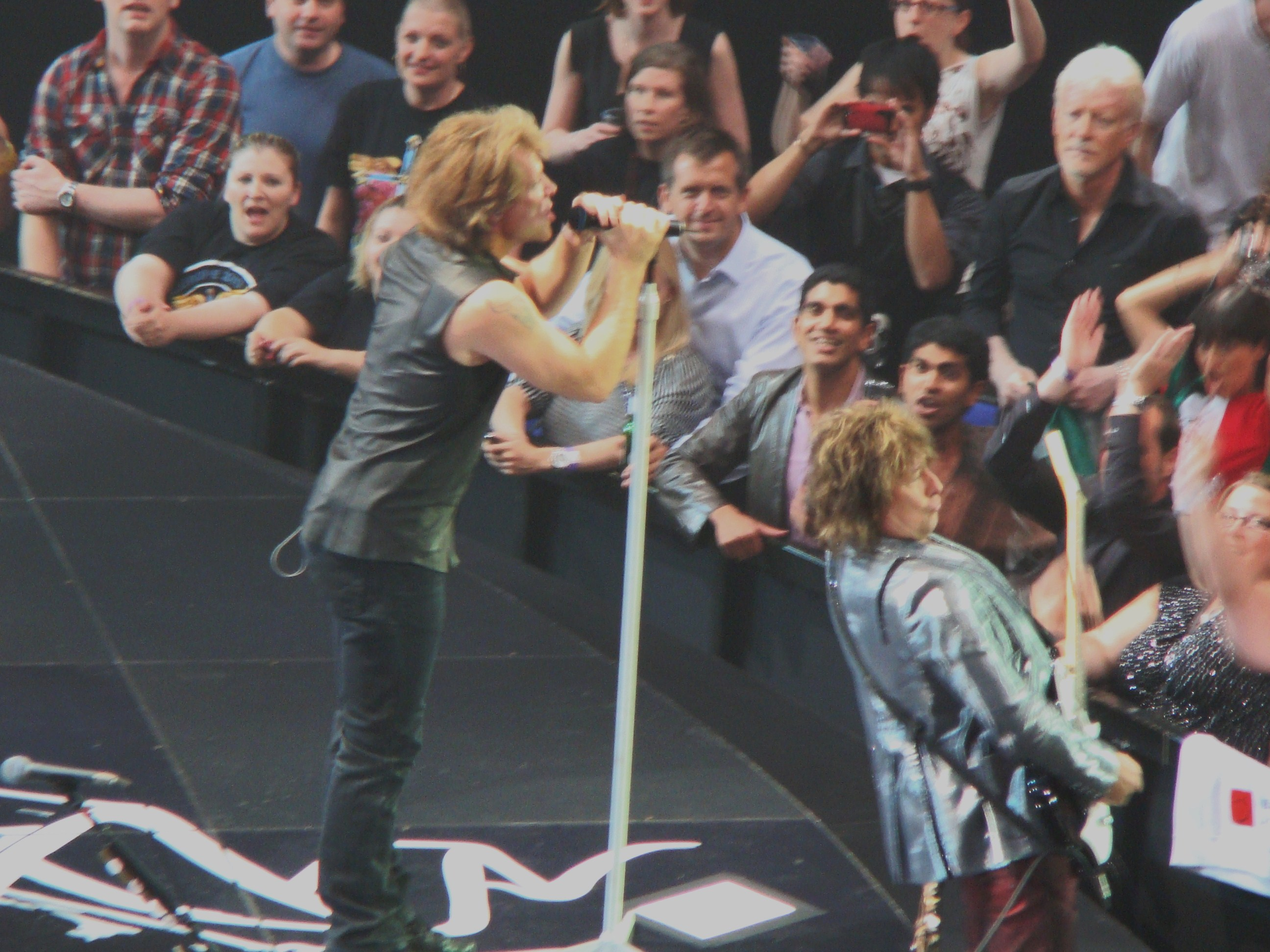
Jon Bon Jovi and Richie Sambora on stage

1. Blood on Blood (song)
2. We Weren't Born to Follow
3. You Give Love a Bad Name
4. Born to Be My Baby
5. Lost Highway
6. Whole Lot of Leavin'
7. When We Were Beautiful
8. Superman Tonight
9. We Got It Goin' On
10. I'll Sleep When I'm Dead
11. Bad Medicine (with snippets of Shout)
12. It's My Life
13. Lay Your Hands on Me (Richie Sambora on lead vocals)
14. (You Want to) Make a Memory
15. Bed of Roses
16. I'll Be There For You
17. Someday I'll Be Saturday Night (acoustic)
18. Keep the Faith
19. Work for the Working Man
20. Who Says You Can't Go Home
21. Love's the Only Rule

Encore:

22. Runaway
23. Wanted Dead or Alive
24. Livin' on a Prayer

== Tour dates ==
List of concerts, showing date, city, country, venue, opening act, tickets sold, number of available tickets and amount of gross revenue
Date	City	Country	Venue	Opening act	Attendance	Revenue
North America
February 11, 2010	Honolulu	United States	Blaisdell Arena	Kings of Spade; Mike Corrado Band	15,291 / 15,291	$1,496,330
February 12, 2010	Honolulu	United States	Blaisdell Arena	Kings of Spade; Mike Corrado Band	15,291 / 15,291	$1,496,330
February 19, 2010	Seattle	United States	KeyArena	Dashboard Confessional	26,917 / 26,917	$2,412,550
February 20, 2010	Seattle	United States	KeyArena	Dashboard Confessional	26,917 / 26,917	$2,412,550
February 22, 2010	San Jose	United States	HP Pavilion at San Jose	Dashboard Confessional	14,244 / 14,244	$1,361,125
February 24, 2010	Glendale	United States	Jobing.com Arena	Dashboard Confessional	13,973 / 13,973	$1,416,502
February 26, 2010	Anaheim	United States	Honda Center	Dashboard Confessional	27,024 / 27,024	$2,654,472
February 27, 2010	Anaheim	United States	Honda Center	Dashboard Confessional	27,024 / 27,024	$2,654,472
March 2, 2010	Sacramento	United States	ARCO Arena	Dashboard Confessional	14,337 / 14,337	$1,187,851
March 4, 2010	Los Angeles	United States	Staples Center	Dashboard Confessional	16,698 / 16,698	$1,737,009
March 6, 2010	Las Vegas	United States	MGM Grand Garden Arena	Dashboard Confessional	14,803 / 14,803	$2,666,025
March 8, 2010	Denver	United States	Pepsi Center	Dashboard Confessional	14,934 / 14,934	$1,314,691
March 9, 2010	Omaha	United States	Qwest Center Omaha	Dashboard Confessional	14,980 / 14,980	$1,122,623
March 11, 2010	Wichita	United States	Intrust Bank Arena	Dashboard Confessional	13,675 / 13,675	$1,064,673
March 13, 2010	Fargo	United States	Fargodome	Dashboard Confessional	22,398 / 22,398	$1,515,395
March 15, 2010	Kansas City	United States	Sprint Center	Dashboard Confessional	15,792 / 15,792	$1,318,327
March 17, 2010	Auburn Hills	United States	The Palace of Auburn Hills	Dashboard Confessional Kid Rock	18,663 / 18,663	$1,326,375
March 19, 2010	Montreal	Canada	Bell Centre	Dashboard Confessional	37,526 / 37,526	$4,024,240
March 20, 2010	Montreal	Canada	Bell Centre	Dashboard Confessional	37,526 / 37,526	$4,024,240
March 23, 2010	Philadelphia	United States	Wachovia Center	Dashboard Confessional	36,697 / 36,697	$3,421,575
March 24, 2010	Philadelphia	United States	Wachovia Center	Dashboard Confessional	36,697 / 36,697	$3,421,575
March 26, 2010	Uncasville	United States	Mohegan Sun Arena	Dashboard Confessional	20,324 / 20,324	$2,444,366
March 27, 2010	Uncasville	United States	Mohegan Sun Arena	Dashboard Confessional	20,324 / 20,324	$2,444,366
March 29, 2010	Washington, D.C.	United States	Verizon Center	Dashboard Confessional	17,287 / 17,287	$1,860,756
April 7, 2010	Saint Paul	United States	Xcel Energy Center	Select Three; Four Forty; Alison Scott	32,574 / 32,574	$2,768,554
April 8, 2010	Saint Paul	United States	Xcel Energy Center	Select Three; Four Forty; Alison Scott	32,574 / 32,574	$2,768,554
April 10, 2010	Dallas	United States	American Airlines Center	The Dallahachie Boys; The Zack King Band	33,032 / 33,032	$3,352,099
April 11, 2010	Dallas	United States	American Airlines Center	The Dallahachie Boys; The Zack King Band	33,032 / 33,032	$3,352,099
April 13, 2010	Tulsa	United States	BOK Center	Dashboard Confessional	17,053 / 17,053	$1,276,475
April 15, 2010	Atlanta	United States	Philips Arena	Dashboard Confessional	16,510 / 16,510	$1,815,719
April 17, 2010	Tampa	United States	St. Pete Times Forum	Dashboard Confessional	18,298 / 18,298	$1,777,817
April 18, 2010	Sunrise	United States	BankAtlantic Center	Dashboard Confessional	17,808 / 17,808	$1,803,620
April 21, 2010	Nashville	United States	Bridgestone Arena	Dashboard Confessional	15,925 / 15,925	$1,623,900
April 22, 2010	Charlotte	United States	Time Warner Cable Arena	Dashboard Confessional	16,913 / 16,913	$1,499,578
May 19, 2010	Hershey	United States	Hersheypark Stadium	Fuel	24,956 / 24,956	$1,691,915
May 26, 2010	East Rutherford	United States	New Meadowlands Stadium	Train; Gavin DeGraw; OneRepublic; Kid Rock	206,099 / 206,099 (Note: The score data is representative of the four shows in East Rutherford, New Jersey at the New Meadowlands Stadium on May 26, May 27, May 29, and July 9 respectively.)	$21,386,437
May 27, 2010	East Rutherford	United States	New Meadowlands Stadium	Train; Gavin DeGraw; OneRepublic; Kid Rock	206,099 / 206,099	$21,386,437
May 29, 2010	East Rutherford	United States	New Meadowlands Stadium	Train; Gavin DeGraw; OneRepublic; Kid Rock	206,099 / 206,099	$21,386,437
Europe
June 4, 2010	Madrid	Spain	Ciudad del Rock	—N/a	—N/a	—N/a
June 5, 2010	Scheveningen	Netherlands	Royal Beach	—N/a	—N/a	—N/a
June 7, 2010	London	England	The O_{2} Arena	OneRepublic; Kid Rock	187,696 / 187,696 (Note: The score data is representative of the 12 shows in London, England at the O2 Arena from June 7 through June 26 respectively.)	$18,178,036
June 8, 2010	London	England	The O_{2} Arena	OneRepublic; Kid Rock	187,696 / 187,696	$18,178,036
June 10, 2010	London	England	The O_{2} Arena	OneRepublic; Kid Rock	187,696 / 187,696	$18,178,036
June 11, 2010	London	England	The O_{2} Arena	OneRepublic	187,696 / 187,696	$18,178,036
June 13, 2010	London	England	The O_{2} Arena	OneRepublic; Kid Rock	187,696 / 187,696	$18,178,036
June 16, 2010	Paris	France	Palais Omnisports de Paris-Bercy	OneRepublic	15,906 / 15,906	$1,395,370
June 17, 2010	London	England	The O_{2} Arena	OneRepublic; Kid Rock		
June 19, 2010	London	England	The O_{2} Arena	OneRepublic; Kid Rock		
June 20, 2010	London	England	The O_{2} Arena	OneRepublic; Kid Rock		
June 22, 2010	London	England	The O_{2} Arena	OneRepublic; Kid Rock		
June 23, 2010	London	England	The O_{2} Arena	OneRepublic; Kid Rock		
June 25, 2010	London	England	The O_{2} Arena	OneRepublic; Kid Rock		
June 26, 2010	London	England	The O_{2} Arena	OneRepublic; Kid Rock		
North America
July 9, 2010	East Rutherford	United States	New Meadowlands Stadium	Train; Gavin DeGraw; OneRepublic; Kid Rock		
July 11, 2010	Saratoga Springs	United States	Saratoga Performing Arts Center	Soraia	14,625 / 14,625	$998,776
July 12, 2010	Cuyahoga Falls	United States	Blossom Music Center	Southside Johnny & the Asbury Jukes	14,065 / 14,065	$1,036,312
July 14, 2010	Calgary	Canada	Pengrowth Saddledome	Zoo Lion Kid Rock	15,859 / 15,859	$1,949,462
July 15, 2010	Edmonton	Canada	Commonwealth Stadium	Kid Rock	40,451 / 40,451	$2,811,477
July 17, 2010	Winnipeg	Canada	Canad Inns Stadium	Kid Rock	36,865 / 36,865	$2,890,829
July 20, 2010	Toronto	Canada	Rogers Centre	Kid Rock	85,494 / 85,494	$6,976,612
July 21, 2010	Toronto	Canada	Rogers Centre	Kid Rock	85,494 / 85,494	$6,976,612
July 23, 2010	Louisville	United States	Churchill Downs	—N/a	—N/a	—N/a
July 24, 2010	Foxborough	United States	Gillette Stadium	Kid Rock	51,138 / 51,138	$4,418,585
July 28, 2010	Regina	Canada	Mosaic Stadium	Kid Rock	33,070 / 33,070	$2,969,495
July 30, 2010	Chicago	United States	Soldier Field	Kid Rock	95,959 / 95,959	$8,606,259
July 31, 2010	Chicago	United States	Soldier Field	Kid Rock	95,959 / 95,959	$8,606,259
Latin America
September 24, 2010	Mexico City	Mexico	Foro Sol	Moderatto	44,124 / 44,124	$2,972,317
September 26, 2010	San José	Costa Rica	Estadio Ricardo Saprissa Aymá	—N/a	—N/a	—N/a
September 29, 2010	Lima	Peru	Estadio Universidad San Marcos	Jhovan	45,193 / 45,193	$3,415,764
October 1, 2010	Santiago	Chile	Estadio Nacional de Chile	Lucybell	46,983 / 46,983	$3,069,075
October 3, 2010	Buenos Aires	Argentina	River Plate Stadium	Los Tipitos	37,633 / 37,633	$4,222,698
October 6, 2010	São Paulo	Brazil	Estádio do Morumbi	Fresno	55,833 / 55,833	$5,537,022
October 8, 2010	Rio de Janeiro	Brazil	Praça da Apoteose	Fresno	15,529 / 32,400	$1,718,300
North America
October 15, 2010	Gulf Shores	United States	Gulf Shores Public Beach	—N/a	—N/a	—N/a
November 9, 2010	Washington, D.C.	United States	Late Show with David Letterman CBS	—N/a	—N/a	—N/a
November 10, 2010	New York City	United States	Times Square Best Buy	—N/a	—N/a	—N/a
Asia
November 30, 2010	Tokyo	Japan	Tokyo Dome	—N/a	60,313 / 60,313	$8,054,976
December 1, 2010	Tokyo	Japan	Tokyo Dome	—N/a	60,313 / 60,313	$8,054,976
Oceania
December 4, 2010	Wellington	New Zealand	Westpac Stadium	Black River Drive	18,692 / 18,692	$2,710,672
December 5, 2010	Auckland	New Zealand	Vector Arena	—N/a	10,755 / 10,755	$1,756,427
December 7, 2010	Perth	Australia	Patersons Stadium	Village Kid	29,644 / 29,644	$4,620,178
December 10, 2010	Melbourne	Australia	Rod Laver Arena	The Scarlets	14,723 / 14,723	$3,558,135
December 11, 2010	Melbourne	Australia	Etihad Stadium	The Scarlets	54,414 / 54,414	$8,139,185
December 14, 2010	Brisbane	Australia	Suncorp Stadium	The Smart	39,424 / 39,424	$6,113,852
December 17, 2010	Sydney	Australia	Sydney Football Stadium	October Rage	103,843 / 103,843	$15,502,107
December 18, 2010	Sydney	Australia	Sydney Football Stadium	October Rage	103,843 / 103,843	$15,502,107
December 19, 2010	Sydney	Australia	Sydney Football Stadium	October Rage	103,843 / 103,843	$15,502,107
Total					1,909,234 / 1,926,105	$201,100,000

== Personnel ==
Bon Jovi

- Jon Bon Jovi – lead vocals, guitar, maracas for Keep the Faith and Bullet, tambourine for Hey God
- Richie Sambora – lead guitar, lead vocals for Lay Your Hands on Me, backing vocals, talk box
- David Bryan – keyboards, backing vocals
- Hugh McDonald – bass, backing vocals
- Tico Torres – drums, percussion, backing vocals for Love For Sale

Additional personnel

- Bobby Bandiera – rhythm guitar, backing vocals
- Jeff Kazee – Hammond organ, keyboards, backing vocals (one-off show in March and another show in June as a substitute for David Bryan who was attending the Tony Awards)
