= Outrage =

Outrage may refer to:

- Outrage (emotion), an emotion
- Tort of outrage, in law, an alternative term for intentional infliction of emotional distress

== Books ==
- Outrage, a novel by Henry Denker 1982
- Outrage, a play by Itamar Moses 2001
- Outrage: The Five Reasons Why O. J. Simpson Got Away with Murder, a 1996 book by Vincent Bugliosi

== Film and television ==
- Outrage (1950 film), a B-movie co-written and directed by Ida Lupino
- Outrage (1973 film), a television crime drama film produced for American Broadcasting Company
- Outrage! (1986 film), an American television movie, starring Robert Preston
- Outrage!, also known as ¡Dispara!, a 1993 Spanish revenge tragedy film directed by Carlos Saura
- Outrage (1998 film), an American television film
- Outrage (2009 film), a documentary directed by Kirby Dick
- Outrage: Born in Terror, a 2009 film starring Natasha Lyonne
- Outrage (2010 film), a Japanese yakuza film by Takeshi Kitano
- The Outrage, a 1964 film directed by Martin Ritt, a remake of Akira Kurosawa's Rashomon
- The Outrage (2011 film), a Thai film starring Mario Maurer, also based on Rashomon
- "The Outrage" (Marcus Welby, M.D.), a controversial 1974 episode of the American series Marcus Welby, M.D.

== Music ==
- Outrage (band), a Japanese thrash metal band
- Outrage (album), a 2011 album by October Rage
- Outrage, a 1988 EP by Oi Polloi
- "Outrage", a song by Booker T. & the M.G.'s from the 1965 album Soul Dressing
- "Outrage", a song by Capital Lights from the 2008 album This Is an Outrage!

== Other ==
- Outrage (webtoon), a superhero webcomic series written by Fabian Nicieza and drawn by Reilly Brown
- Outrage! (game), a board game
- OutRage!, a UK LGBT-rights direct-action group
- Outrage Entertainment, a video game developer
- Outrage porn, a media technique of boosting viewer engagement by posting addictive outrage-provoking content

== See also ==
- Outage (disambiguation)
