= WWE in New Zealand =

- Created by: Vince McMahon
- Promotions: WWE
- Brands: Raw; SmackDown
- First event: WWE SmackDown Road to WrestleMania 22 Tour

WWE (formerly World Wrestling Federation and World Wrestling Entertainment), an American professional wrestling promotion based in Stamford, Connecticut, in the United States owned by the McMahon family, has been promoting events in New Zealand since 2006.

== History ==
WWE held their first live event tour in New Zealand on March 4, 2006, at the Westpac Stadium in Wellington. This was the WWE Smackdown Road to WrestleMania 22 Tour, which featured a main event triple threat match between Kurt Angle, Undertaker and Mark Henry for the World Heavyweight Championship. This event drew 23,875 people.

The following two years, WWE returned to New Zealand for a pair of SmackDown and ECW co-branded shows. In 2009 and 2011 the Raw brand did a one night show in Auckland, with SmackDown doing a show in 2010. The WWE then took a long break between shows in New Zealand and did not return until 2016. At the 2016 show, WWE announced NXT would be doing a show as part of their Oceania tour. Two NXT Live shows were scheduled for December 5 and 6, 2016 at The Trusts Arena in Auckland and the TSB Bank Arena in Wellington. however these were eventually cancelled. The following year, in 2017 the Raw brand returned to New Zealand for one show in Christchurch.

WWE announced the Raw brand would return for a live event at Auckland's Spark Arena on August 8, 2020. This show was later postponed three times supposedly due to the COVID-19 pandemic. It was firstly postponed to July 31, 2021, secondly postponed to August 4, 2022, and lastly postponed with no new date given. The event was eventually cancelled on May 5, 2023, over 3 years since its original announcement.

== Events in New Zealand ==
Date	Name	Brand	Venue	City	Main event
March 4, 2006	WWE SmackDown Road to WrestleMania 22 Tour	SmackDown	Westpac Stadium	Wellington	Kurt Angle vs. Mark Henry vs. The Undertaker for the World Heavyweight Championship
February 23, 2007	WWE SmackDown Road to WrestleMania 23 Tour	SmackDown & ECW	Westpac Centre	Christchurch	Batista vs. Mr. Kennedy for the World Heavyweight Championship
February 24, 2007	WWE SmackDown Road to WrestleMania 23 Tour	SmackDown & ECW	Western Springs Stadium	Auckland	Batista vs. Mr. Kennedy for the World Heavyweight Championship
June 11, 2008	WWE Smackdown ECW Tour	SmackDown & ECW	Vector Arena	Auckland	Edge vs. Batista for the World Heavyweight Championship
June 12, 2008	WWE Smackdown ECW Tour	SmackDown & ECW	Westpac Centre	Christchurch	Matt Hardy, Batista & The Undertaker vs. Edge, Montel Vontavious Porter and Mark Henry
July 3, 2009	WWE Raw Live Tour	Raw	Vector Arena	Auckland	Randy Orton & Big Show vs. John Cena & Triple H
August 5, 2010	WWE SmackDown Live 2010	SmackDown	Vector Arena	Auckland	Kane vs. Rey Mysterio for the World Heavyweight Championship
July 6, 2011	WWE World Tour	Raw	Vector Arena	Auckland	John Cena vs. R-Truth for the WWE Championship
August 10, 2016	WWE Live: New Zealand	Unbranded	Vector Arena	Auckland	Roman Reigns vs. Seth Rollins
September 13, 2017	WWE Live: New Zealand	Raw	Horncastle Arena	Christchurch	Roman Reigns vs. Braun Strowman in a Street Fight
December 17, 2026	WWE New Zealand Live Tour 2026	Raw	Spark Arena	Auckland	TBA

== WWE Road to WrestleMania 22 Tour ==
WWE SmackDown Road to WrestleMania 22 Tour
- Promotional poster featuring Batista
- Promotion: World Wrestling Entertainment
- Brand: SmackDown!
- Date: March 4, 2006
- City: Wellington, New Zealand
- Venue: Westpac Stadium
- Attendance: 23,875

The WWE SmackDown Road to WrestleMania 22 Tour was the first WWE event held in New Zealand and took place at the Westpac Stadium in Wellington, New Zealand, on March 4, 2006. The event was recorded by WWE and aired exclusively on WWE 24/7 in the United States. Michael Cole and Tazz recorded the commentary from WWE headquarters in Stamford, Connecticut.

The event was attended by 23,875. WWE talent and management were impressed with the reactions and excitement by the audience, and also the large size of the stadium. “Holy Cow, this is a coliseum, not an arena,” was one of the WWE wrestler's remarks when entering inside New Zealand's second-largest stadium.

WWE 24/7 along with this event also re-aired the Road to WrestleMania Tournament finals where Triple H defeated Rob Van Dam and Big Show to win the tournament and win the right to face John Cena at WrestleMania 22 for the WWE Championship.

=== Results ===
No.	Results	Stipulations	Times
1^{D}	Gregory Helms (c) defeated Jamie Noble and Kid Kash	Triple Threat match for the WWE Cruiserweight Championship	—
2^{D}	Funaki defeated Sylvain	Singles match	—
3^{D}	MNM (Joey Mercury and Johnny Nitro) (c) defeated Paul London and Brian Kendrick	Tag Team match for the WWE Tag Team Championship	—
4	Road Warrior Animal defeated Matt Hardy	Singles match	5:30
5	Bobby Lashley defeated Finlay	Singles match	8:31
6	The Boogeyman defeated Orlando Jordan	Singles match	3:50
7	Chris Benoit (c) defeated Booker T by submission	Singles match for the WWE United States Championship	11:06
8	Rey Mysterio defeated Randy Orton	Singles match	13:34
9	The Undertaker defeated Kurt Angle (c) and Mark Henry (with Daivari) by disqualification	Triple Threat match for the World Heavyweight Championship	14:32
(c) / – the champion(s) heading into the match; D / – this was a dark match

=== Other on-screen personnel ===
The setup in the Westpac Stadium before the event.

- Commentators
  - Michael Cole
  - Tazz
- Ring Announcer
  - Tony Chimel
- Referee
  - Nick Patrick
  - Charles Robinson
  - Jimmy Korderas

== Broadcast ==
The WWE and Sky had an agreement to carry WWE programming in New Zealand from the late 1990s until the end of 2024. Weekly television programming was aired on Sky 5 (previously known as Sky 1 and The Box). Pay-per-views were aired on Sky Arena / Sky Box Office.

In August 2014, WWE Network launched in New Zealand. This was later closed on 1 January 2025, with all WWE programming moving to Netflix in New Zealand as part of WWE's worldwide deal with the streaming platform.

Programming	Notes
WWE Premium Live Events	Broadcast live on Netflix
WWE Raw	Broadcast live on Netflix
WWE NXT	Broadcast live on Netflix
WWE SmackDown	Broadcast live on Netflix
