= Outage =

Outage may refer to:

- System outage
- Outing
- Power outage
- Sun outage

== See also ==
- Outrage (disambiguation)
