= Wellington Regional Stadium =

Sporting venue in Wellington, New Zealand

Wellington Regional Stadium Hnry Stadium
- The Cake Tin
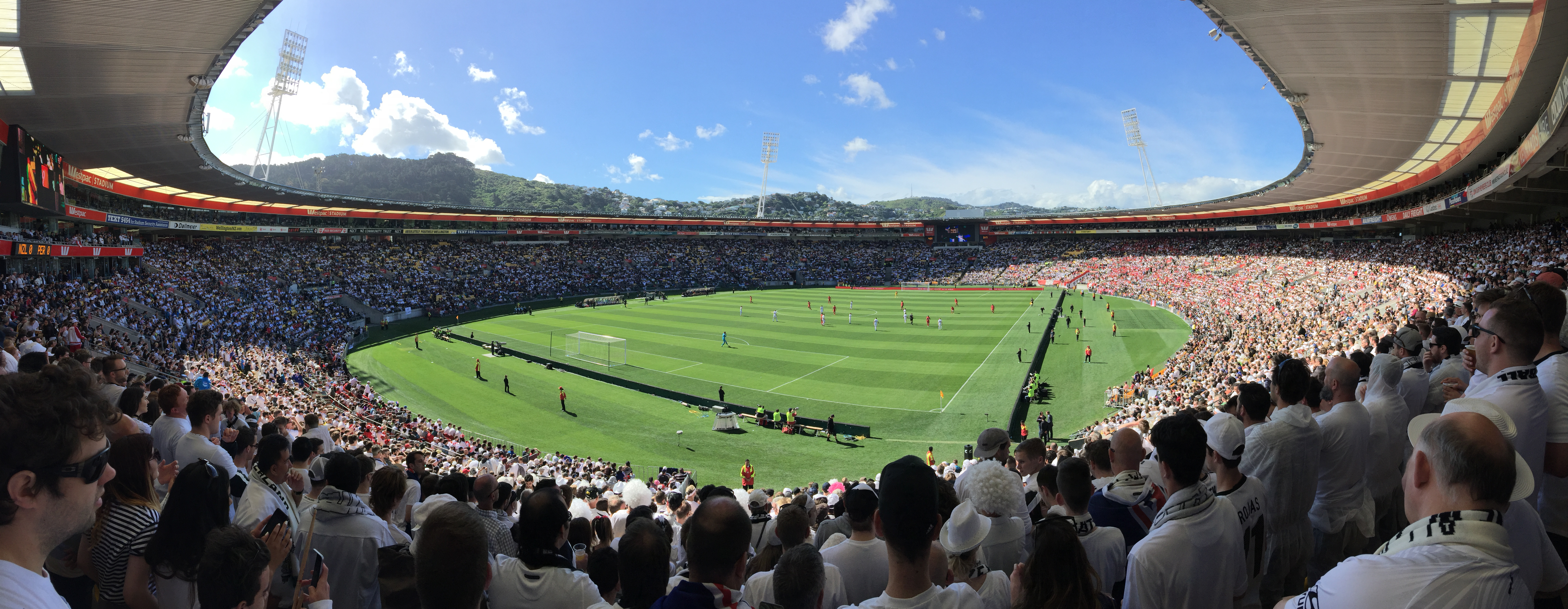
- The stadium on a matchday in 2017
- Interactive map of Wellington Regional Stadium; Hnry Stadium
- Former names: WestpacTrust Stadium (2000–2002); Westpac Stadium (2002–2019); Sky Stadium (2020–2026)
- Location: Wellington, New Zealand
- Coordinates: 41°16′23″S 174°47′9″E
- Owner: Wellington Regional Stadium Trust (Greater Wellington Regional Council and Wellington City Council)
- Operator: Wellington Regional Stadium Trust
- Capacity: 34,500
- Surface: Grass
- Record attendance: 47,260
- Field size: Length (north–south) 235 metres (771 ft); Width (west–east) 185 metres (607 ft) (stadium dimensions, not the playing surface); Area 15,050 square metres (162,000 sq ft)
- Public transit: Wellington station

Construction
- Groundbreaking: 12 March 1998
- Built: 1998–2000
- Opened: 3 January 2000
- Cost: NZ$130 million
- Architects: Warren and Mahoney; Populous (then Bligh Lobb Sports Architecture)
- Project managers: Beca Carter Hollings & Ferner Ltd
- Main contractor: Fletcher Construction Ltd

Tenants
- Rugby union Hurricanes (Super Rugby) (2000–present); Wellington Lions (National Provincial Championship) (2000–present); New Zealand national rugby union team (some matches) Rugby league Canterbury-Bankstown Bulldogs (NRL) (2003–2004, 2016); Canberra Raiders (NRL) (2003); New Zealand Warriors (NRL) (2013–2015, 2019–present) Association football Wellington Phoenix Men (A-League Men) (2008–present); Wellington Phoenix Women (A-League Women) (2022–present); New Zealand men's national football team (some matches) Other St Kilda Football Club (AFL) (2013–2015); New Zealand national Australian rules football team (AFL International Cup/AFL Pacific Cup) (2002–present); Wellington Firebirds (Super Smash) (2012–2014); New Zealand Institute of Sport

Website
- hnrystadium.co.nz

Ground information
- End names
- Hutt End; City End

International information
- First men's ODI: 8–9 January 2000: New Zealand v West Indies
- Last men's ODI: 1 November 2025: New Zealand v England
- First men's T20I: 22 December 2006: New Zealand v Sri Lanka
- Last men's T20I: 26 March 2025: New Zealand v Pakistan
- Only women's ODI: 15 February 2000: New Zealand v England
- First women's T20I: 26 February 2010: New Zealand v Australia
- Last women's T20I: 26 March 2025: New Zealand v Australia
- As of 27 March 2025; Source: ESPNcricinfo

Wellington Regional Stadium (commercially known as Hnry Stadium through naming rights—pronounced like "Henry") is a multi-purpose stadium in Wellington, New Zealand. It is known colloquially as "The Cake Tin". It was built to replace Athletic Park, which was no longer considered adequate for international events due to its location and state of disrepair. The stadium was also built to provide a larger-capacity venue for One Day International cricket matches, due to the Basin Reserve ground losing such matches to larger stadiums in other parts of the country.

The stadium was built in 1999 by Fletcher Construction. It was the first bowl stadium built in New Zealand. The venue is situated one kilometre (0.62 mi) north of the CBD, close to major transport facilities such as Wellington railway station. It was built on reclaimed railway land, which was surplus to requirements.

== Naming rights ==
Westpac Trust, later known as just Westpac, signed on to be the naming sponsor for the stadium when it opened in 2000. That arrangement continued for twenty years until 31 December 2019. On 22 August 2019, it was announced that Sky had signed a six-year agreement to take over as the naming sponsor of the stadium from 1 January 2020.

In May 2025, it was announced that Sky will relinquish the naming rights at end of their contract, near the end of the year 2025. On 27 January 2026, tax and accountancy automation firm Hnry was announced as the new naming sponsor for a five-year term beginning on 1 March 2026.

== Tenants ==
The stadium is a multi-purpose facility, though used mainly for sporting events. It is the home of the Wellington Lions Mitre 10 Cup rugby team and the Hurricanes Super Rugby team. The stadium also hosted the Wellington Sevens, one of the events that was part of the annual World Rugby Sevens Series for national rugby sevens teams. Hnry Stadium regularly serves as a home venue for All Blacks rugby matches.

Hnry Stadium is also the home venue for A-League team Wellington Phoenix FC, the stadium often referred to as "The Ring of Fire" by Phoenix supporters. It also serves as a major home venue for the New Zealand men's national football team (the All Whites), notably hosting the home leg of their 2010 FIFA World Cup qualification match against Bahrain.

During the summer the stadium generally hosts international and formerly domestic limited overs cricket, with the home team being the New Zealand White Ferns or Black Caps for the international contests, and the Wellington Firebirds for the domestic competition. A domestic match has not been held at the stadium since 2017. 30 matches have been played by the White Ferns or Black Caps at the stadium since its completion in 2000, 14 ODI's and 16 T20.

The stadium has also been used for rugby league matches, including national team fixtures and New Zealand Warriors away fixtures. The St Kilda Football Club, an Australian rules football club in the Australian Football League (AFL), played home games on Anzac Day at the venue from 2013 to 2015.

Off-field facilities built into the stadium also included the New Zealand Institute of Sport, and a campus for the Wellington School of Cricket, run by the Wellington Cricket Association.

== Events ==
=== Sports ===
In 2002, during an England versus Black Caps cricket match, director Peter Jackson recorded 30,000 fans chanting in Black Speech for the sound of 10,000 chanting Uruk-hai during the Battle of Helm's Deep in the film The Lord of the Rings: The Two Towers.

On 14 October 2007, Australia defeated New Zealand in the Centenary Test rugby league game. The 58–0 defeat set a new record for the largest loss by the New Zealand national rugby league team.

On 1 December 2007, the stadium hosted an exhibition match between Wellington Phoenix FC and the Los Angeles Galaxy. LA Galaxy won 4–1 in front of 31,853 spectators, the largest crowd for non-national football (soccer) match in New Zealand history.

New Zealand hosted the 2008 FIFA U-17 Women's World Cup. Six pool matches and two playoff matches were played at the then Westpac Stadium. Due to FIFA rules disallowing host stadiums to be named after non-FIFA sponsors, the stadium was officially known as "Wellington Stadium" during the event.

The stadium hosted the national team's 2010 FIFA World Cup qualifying match on 14 November 2009 against Bahrain. New Zealand won the match 1–0, with a record crowd at the time of 35,194 for a football match in New Zealand.

The stadium hosted eight games during the 2011 Rugby World Cup, including two quarter-final matches.

On 25 April 2013, the stadium hosted the first AFL game outside of Australia for premiership points, with Sydney defeating St Kilda by 16 points in front of 22,546 spectators.

On 11 May 2013, the stadium and Wellington hosted its first National Rugby League fixture since 2004 with the Auckland-based New Zealand Warriors hosting the Canterbury-Bankstown Bulldogs at the stadium for 'The Capital Clash'. The Warriors wore their 'Capital Clash' jerseys which incorporated the black and gold colours of Wellington and a design based on a strip worn by Wellington Rugby league teams in the 1970s. The Warriors lost the game late in the match in front of 28,096 fans.

On 20 November 2013, the stadium hosted the second leg of the World Cup qualification inter-confederation play-off against Mexico, which resulted in New Zealand failing to qualify for the 2014 FIFA World Cup.

On 15 November 2014, the stadium hosted the 2014 Rugby League Four Nations Final. It was the first Four Nations Final held in New Zealand, though the Mount Smart Stadium in Auckland hosted the inaugural final of the tournament, then known as the Tri-Nations, in 1999.

The stadium was one of the venues for 2015 Cricket World Cup which was co-hosted by New Zealand and Australia. It hosted a total of four matches during the World Cup which included a quarter-final clash between the hosts New Zealand and West Indies.

On 11 November 2017, the stadium hosted its third World Cup qualification inter-confederation play-off with the New Zealand men's national football team drawing 0–0 against Peru in front of a new record crowd for a football match in New Zealand of 37,034 fans thanks to extra seating install in the stadium for the match.

The stadium hosted several matches for the 2023 FIFA Women's World Cup.

The stadium hosted the semi-finals for OFC qualification for the 2026 FIFA World Cup.

The stadium hosted the Nations Championship Test match between New Zealand and Italy on 11 July, 2026.

==== Major tournaments ====
2011 Rugby World Cup

11 September 2011	South Africa	17–16	Wales	Regional Stadium, Wellington; Attendance: 33,331
17 September 2011	South Africa	49–3	Fiji	Regional Stadium, Wellington; Attendance: 33,262
23 September 2011	Australia	67–5	United States	Regional Stadium, Wellington; Attendance: 33,824
25 September 2011	Argentina	13–12	Scotland	Regional Stadium, Wellington; Attendance: 26,937
1 October 2011	France	14–19	Tonga	Regional Stadium, Wellington; Attendance: 32,763
2 October 2011	New Zealand	79–15	Canada	Regional Stadium, Wellington; Attendance: 37,665
8 October 2011	Ireland	10–22	Wales	Regional Stadium, Wellington; Attendance: 35,787
9 October 2011	South Africa	9–11	Australia	Regional Stadium, Wellington; Attendance: 34,914

2015 Cricket World Cup

20 February (D/N)
Scorecard

England; 123 (33.2 overs)	v	New Zealand; 125/2 (12.2 overs)

New Zealand won by 8 wickets
Wellington Regional Stadium, Wellington
Attendance: 30,148

1 March
Scorecard

England; 309/6 (50 overs)	v	Sri Lanka; 312/1 (47.2 overs)

Sri Lanka won by 9 wickets
Wellington Regional Stadium, Wellington
Attendance: 18,183

12 March (D/N)
Scorecard

South Africa; 341/6 (50 overs)	v	United Arab Emirates; 195 (47.3 overs)

South Africa won by 146 runs
Wellington Regional Stadium, Wellington
Attendance: 4,901

21 March (D/N)
Scorecard

New Zealand; 393/6 (50 overs)	v	West Indies; 250 (30.3 overs)

New Zealand won by 143 runs
Wellington Regional Stadium, Wellington
Attendance: 30,268

Date	Team #1	Res.	Team #2	Stage	Attendance
21 July 2023	Spain	3–0	Costa Rica	Group C	22,966
23 July 2023	Sweden	2–1	South Africa	Group G	18,317
25 July 2023	New Zealand	0–1	Philippines	Group A	32,357
27 July 2023	United States	1–1	Netherlands	Group E	27,312
29 July 2023	Sweden	5–0	Italy	Group G	29,143
31 July 2023	Japan	4–0	Spain	Group C	20,957
2 August 2023	South Africa	3–2	Italy	Group G	14,967
5 August 2023	Japan	3–1	Norway	Round of 16	33,042
11 August 2023	Spain	2–1 (a.e.t)	Netherlands	Quarter-finals	32,201

==== Rugby League Test matches ====
Since its opening in 2000, Wellington Regional Stadium has hosted six New Zealand rugby league internationals. The results were as follows;.

Date	Opponent	Result	Attendance	Part of
13 July 2001	Australia	10–28	26,580	
12 October 2002	Australia	24–32	25,015	2002 New Zealand Kiwis tour
11 November 2006	Great Britain	34–4	16,401	2006 Tri-Nations
11 October 2007	Australia	0–58	16,681	2007 All Golds Tour
23 October 2010	England	24–10	20,324	2010 Four Nations
12 November 2014	Australia	22–18	25,093	2014 Four Nations Final
18 November 2017	Fiji	2–4	12,713	2017 World Cup

=== Music ===
In 2000, the then-Westpac Stadium hosted the Edinburgh Military Tattoo. This was the first time the event was hosted outside Edinburgh, Scotland. They returned to Wellington to play at the stadium again in February 2016.

In 2006, a concert was held by the Rolling Stones, which ended the Australasian leg of its A Bigger Bang World Tour,

On 17 January 2008, the stadium hosted the kickoff show of the Oceania leg of the Police Reunion Tour and over Easter the inaugural two-day "Rock2Wgtn" music festival, headlined by Kiss and Ozzy Osbourne. Attendance over the two days was around 50,000.

On 28 January 2010, AC/DC kicked off the Australasian leg of its Black Ice World Tour at the stadium. The concert quickly sold out so a second was scheduled for 30 January. The stadium was also a venue for Bon Jovi's The Circle Tour in 2010.

Guns N' Roses performed at the stadium during their Not in This Lifetime... Tour on 2 February 2017.

On 2 March 2019, the stadium drew its second largest crowd to date with an attendance of 46,474 for Eminem's Rapture concert.

On 5 February 2020, Queen + Adam Lambert performed at the stadium during their Rhapsody Tour.

On 8 December 2022, Guns N' Roses performed at the stadium during their 2020 Tour. The Foo Fighters were supposed to play a week later on 15 December, however it was cancelled after the death of Foo Fighters' drummer Taylor Hawkins.

On 2 February 2023, Ed Sheeran performed as part of his +–=÷× Tour. The crowd of 47,000 was the largest ever attendance for an event at the stadium. Organisers said just over a third of the crowd (16,200) were from outside the Wellington region.

On 27 January 2024, the Foo Fighters played for the first time in Wellington on their World Tour.

=== Other events ===
On 4 March 2006, WWE's first New Zealand show, WWE SmackDown Road to WrestleMania 22 Tour, was held at the stadium. 23,875 people attended the televised event. There were nine matches, including a triple threat match between Kurt Angle, The Undertaker, and Mark Henry for the World Heavyweight Championship (WWE).

== Gallery ==
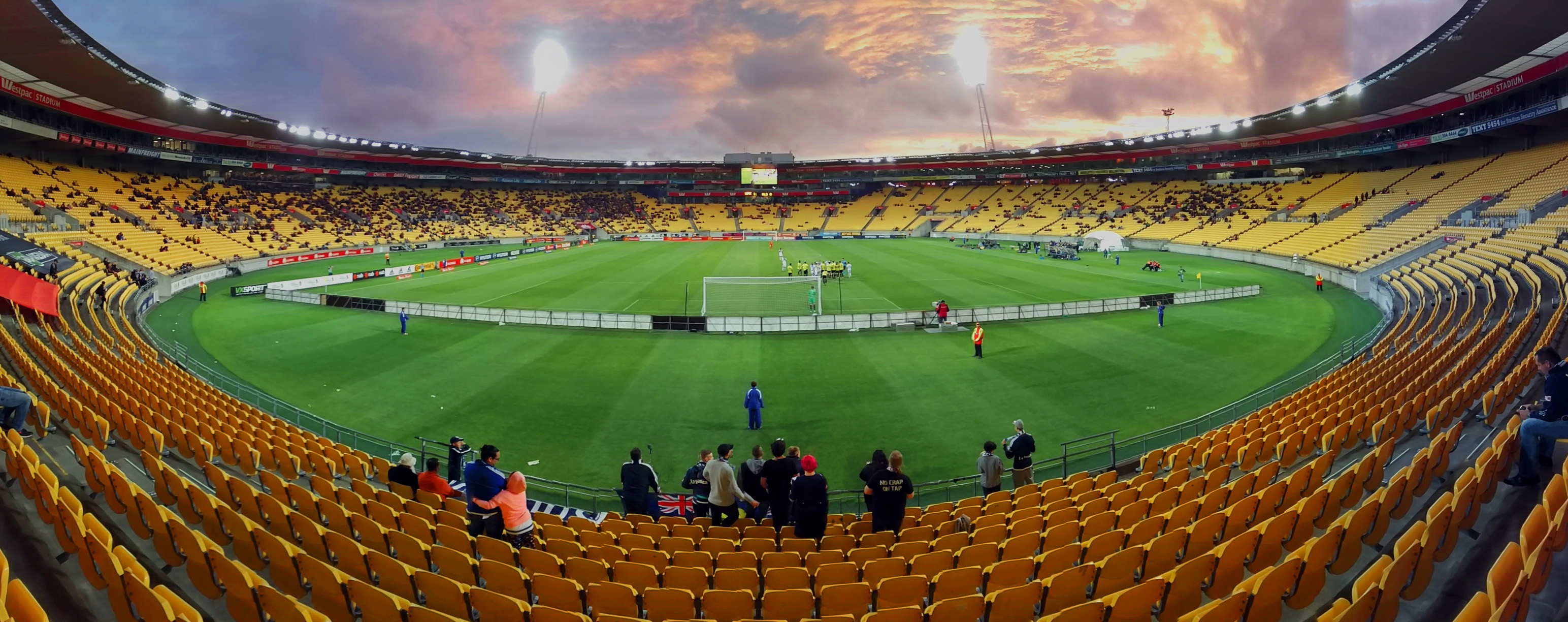
Panorama of Wellington Regional Stadium during an A-League match in 2017

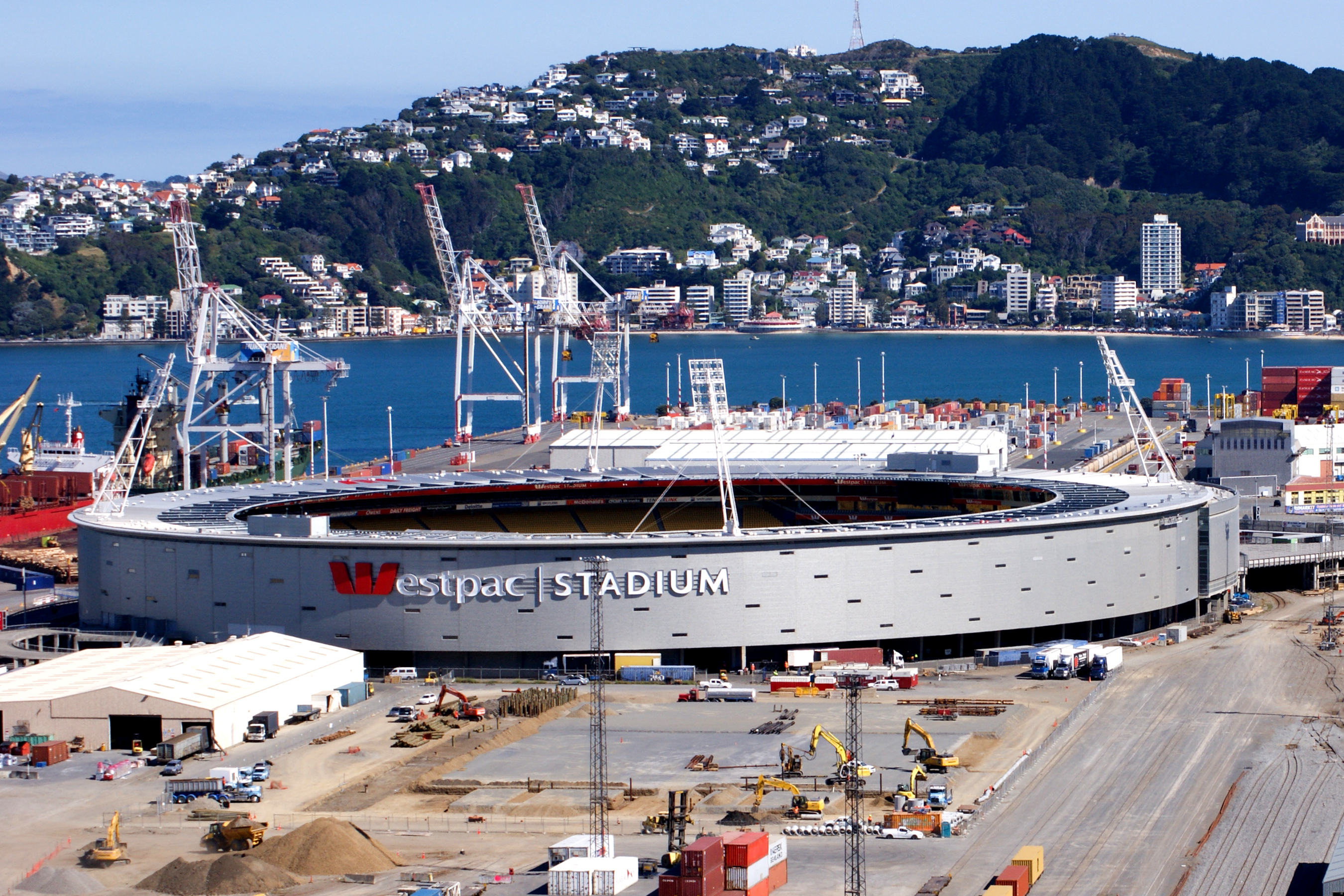
An aerial view of the stadium and its surrounds, 2010

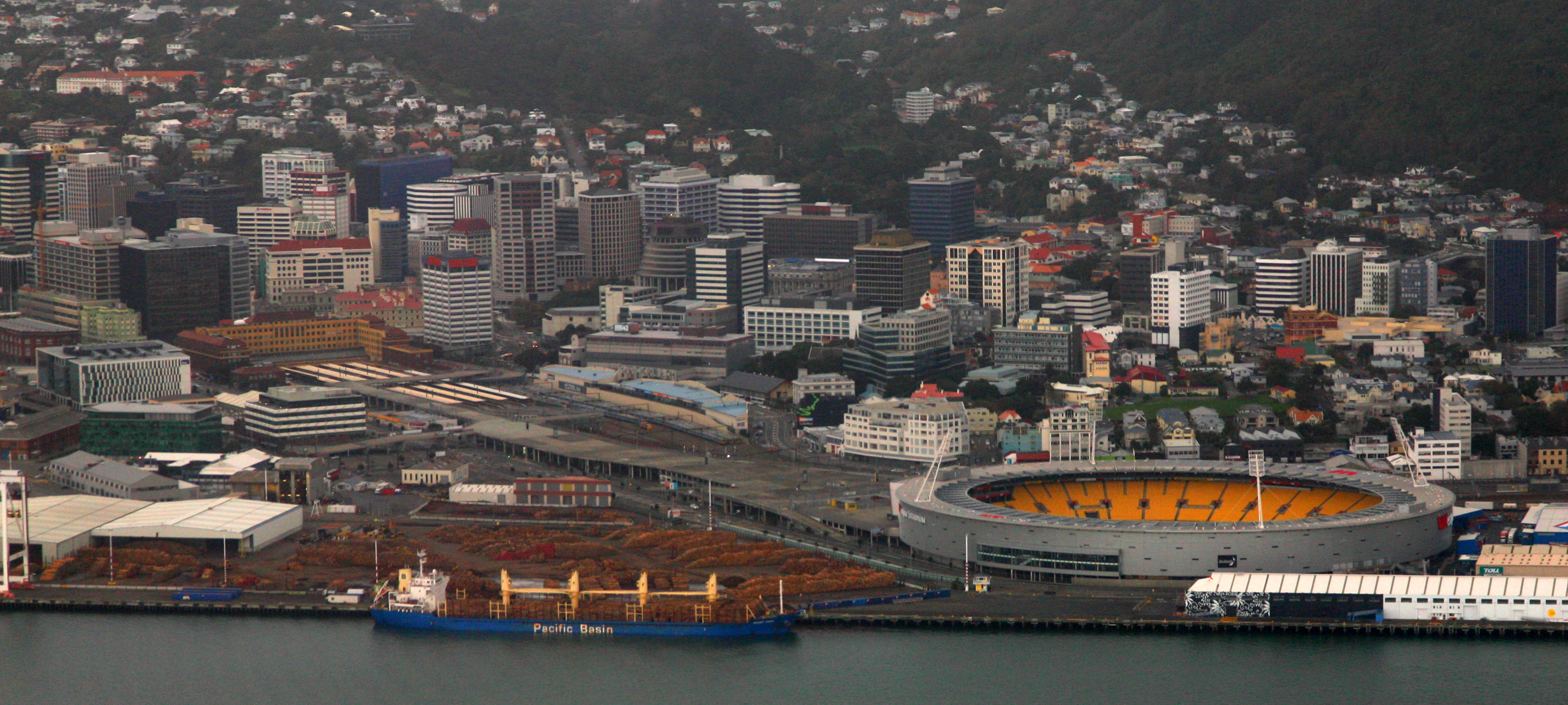
Wellington Regional Stadium and CentrePort Wellington, 2015

The setup of the stadium before the WWE Road to WrestleMania 22 event on 4 March 2006.

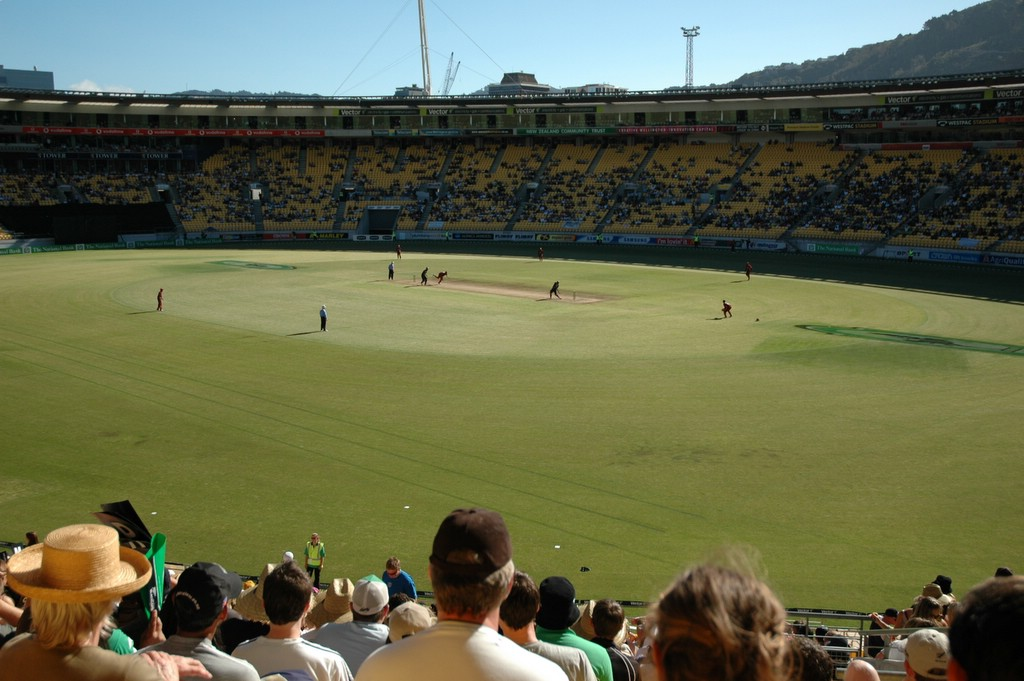
An ODI cricket match between New Zealand and West Indies in 2009 National Bank series

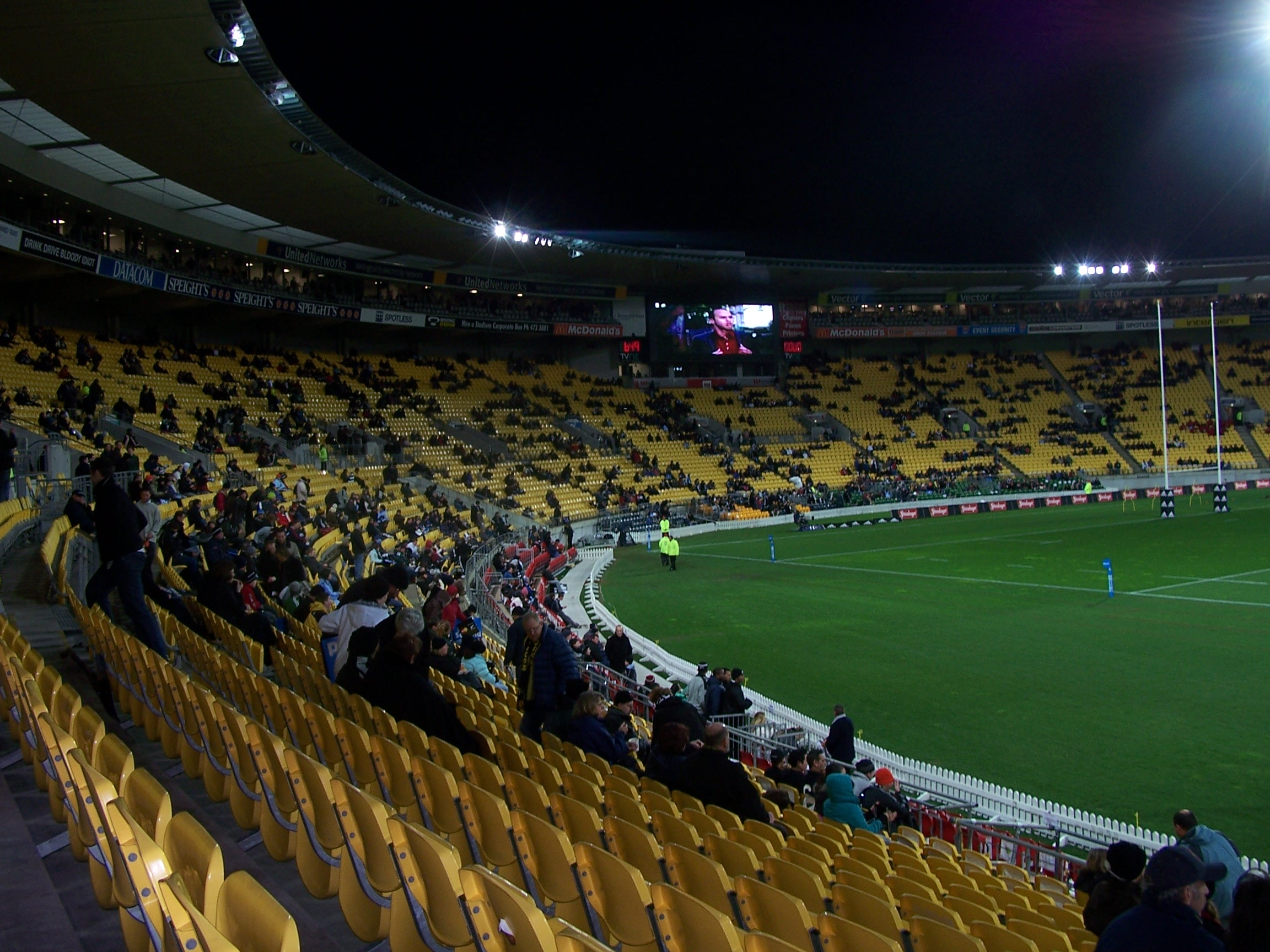
Crowd at a Tri-Nations rugby union match

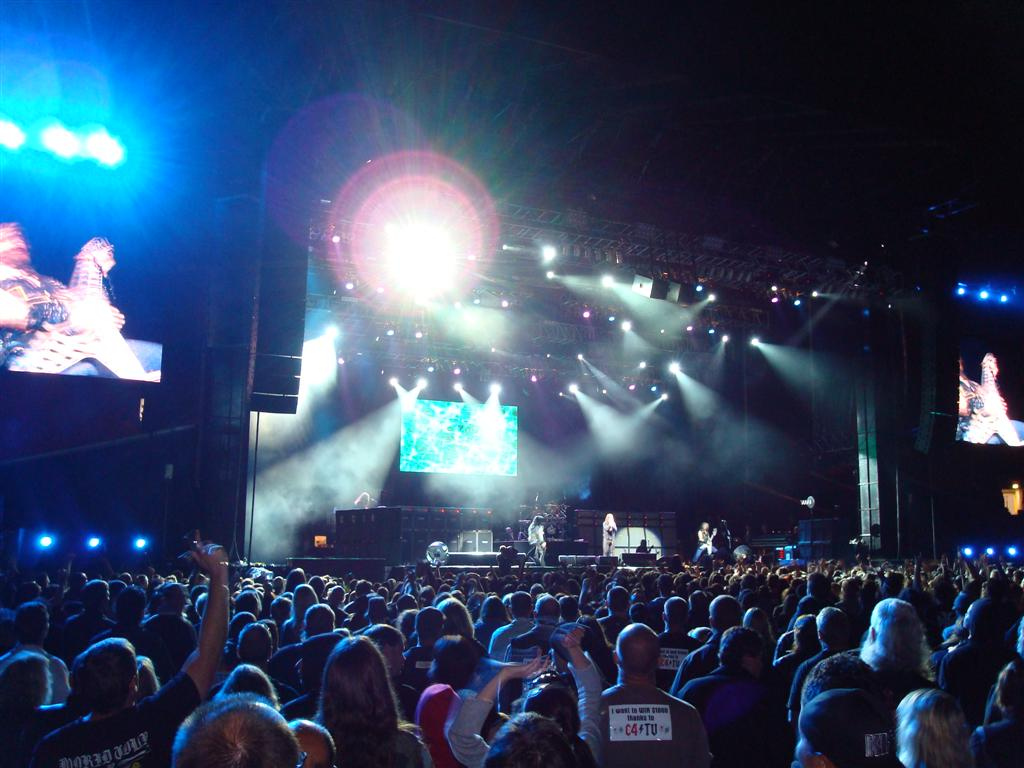
Rock2Wgtn Easter weekend 2008

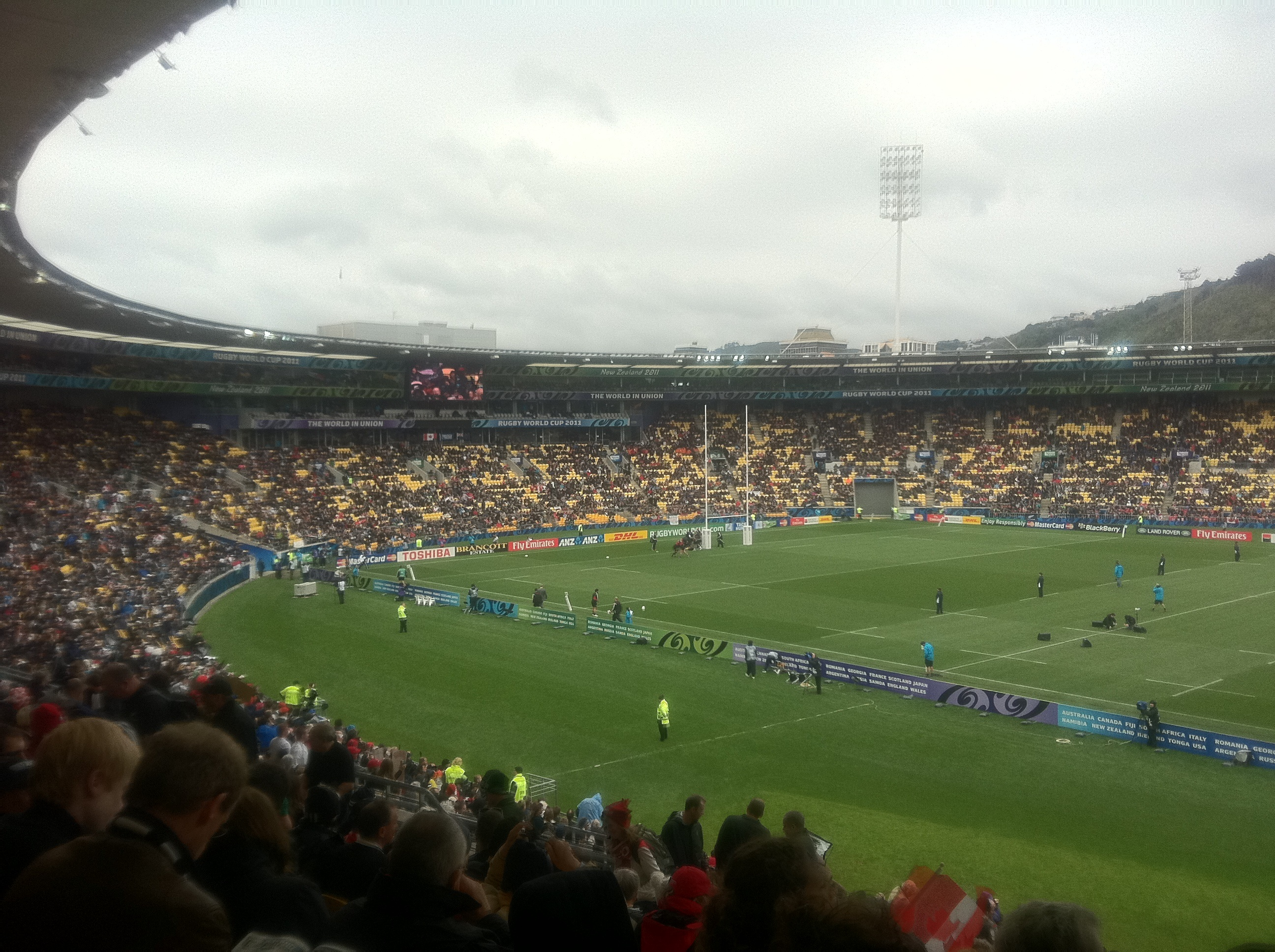
The stadium during the pool match between New Zealand and Canada at the 2011 Rugby World Cup

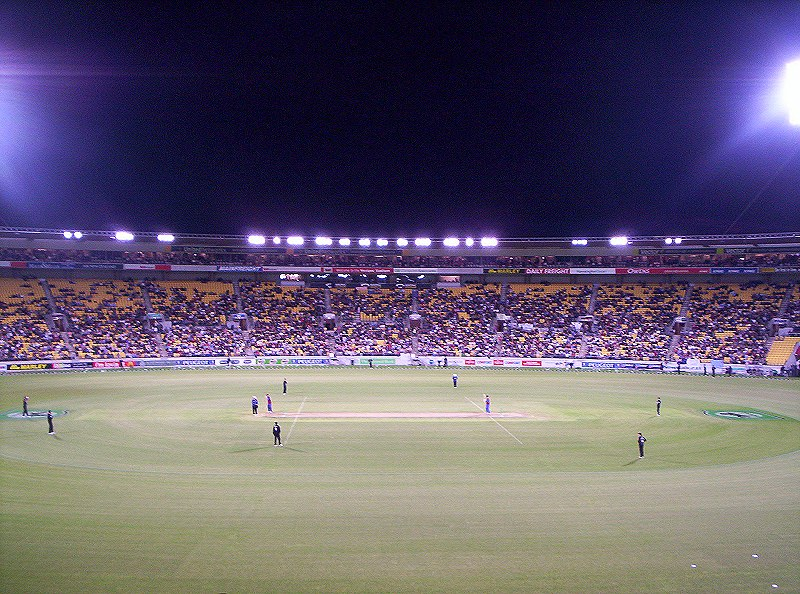
The stadium at night during an ODI match between New Zealand and England

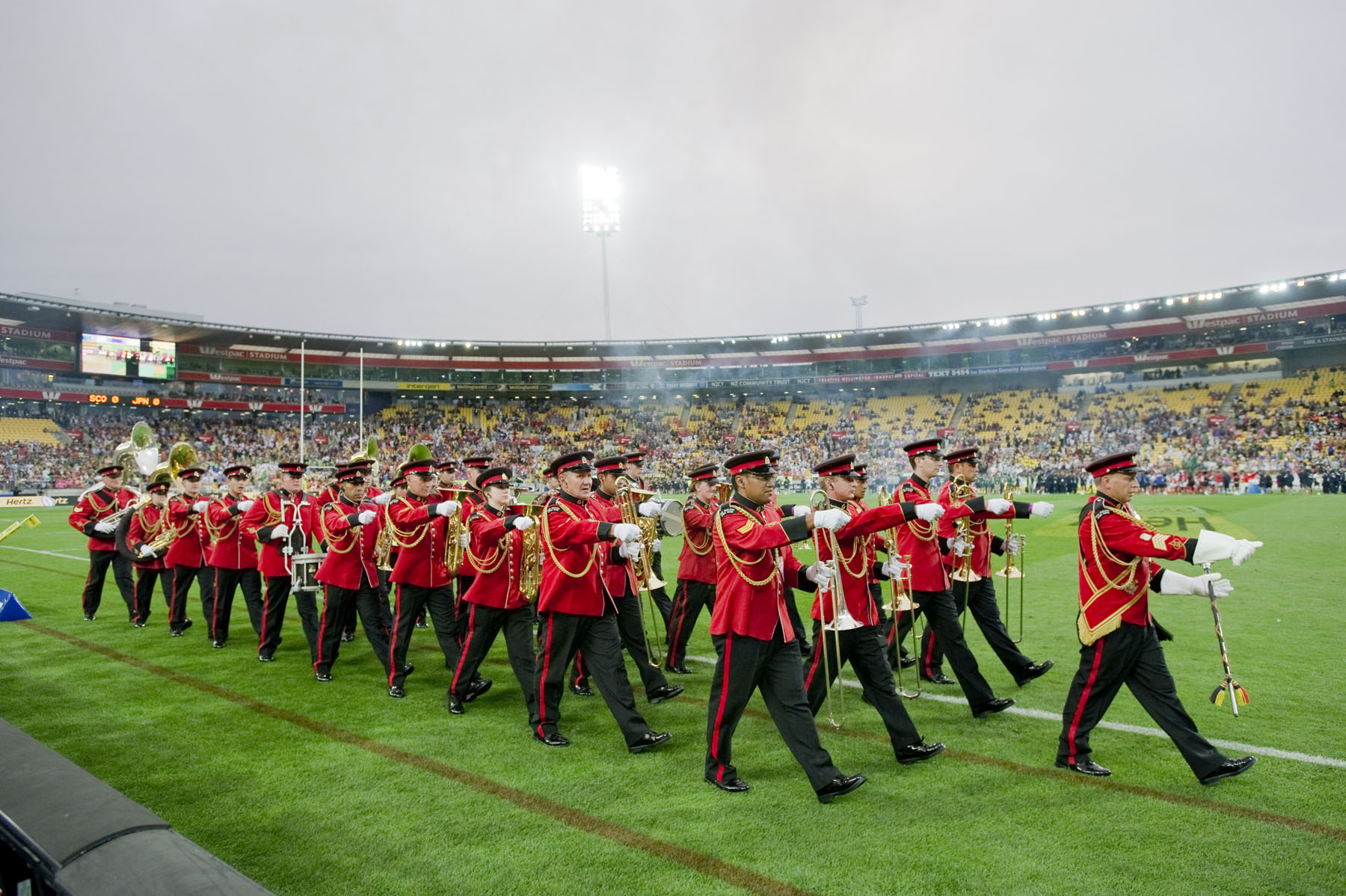
NZ Army Band performance at Wellington Regional Stadium

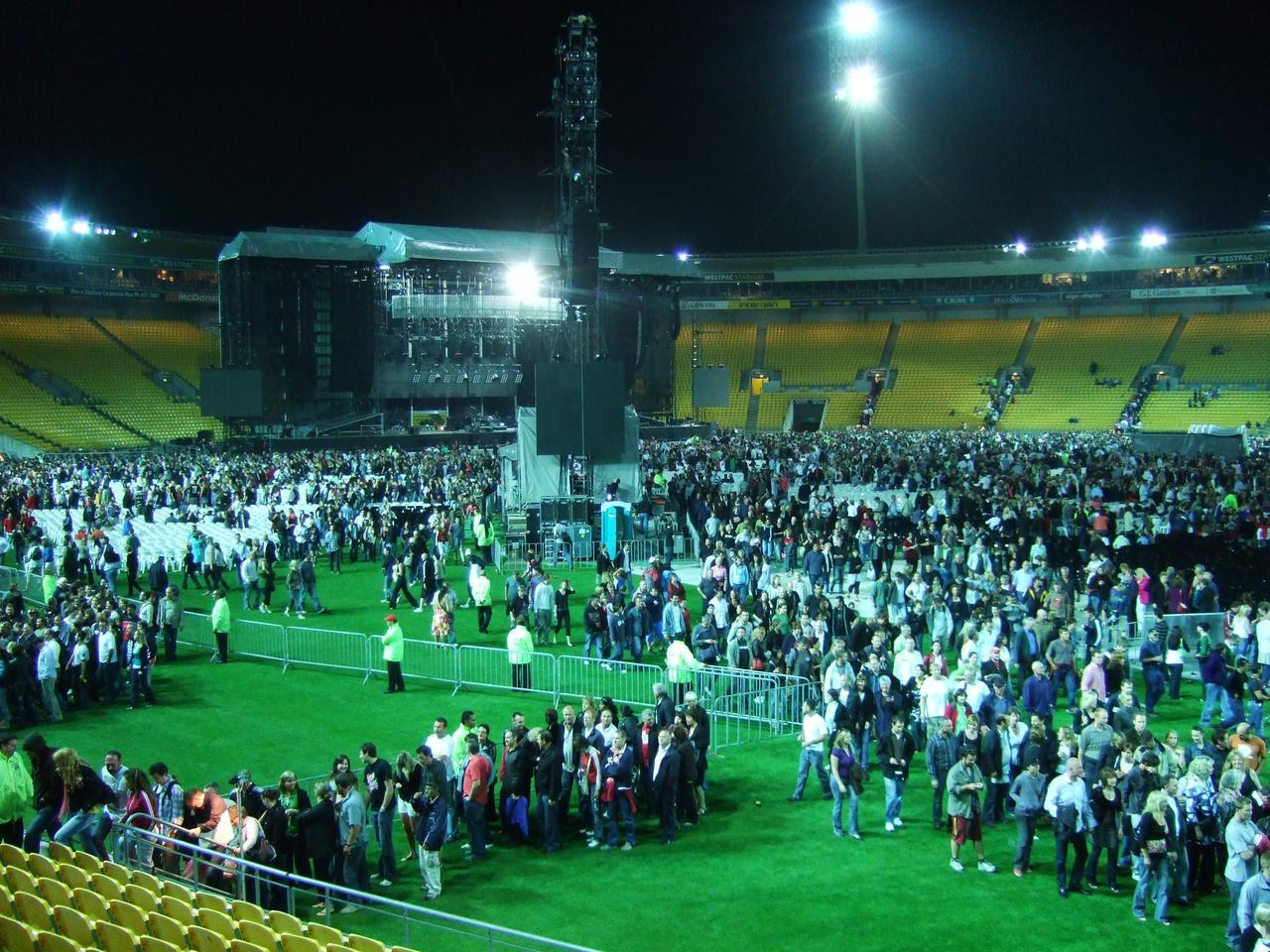
The end of the Police concert on 17 January 2008

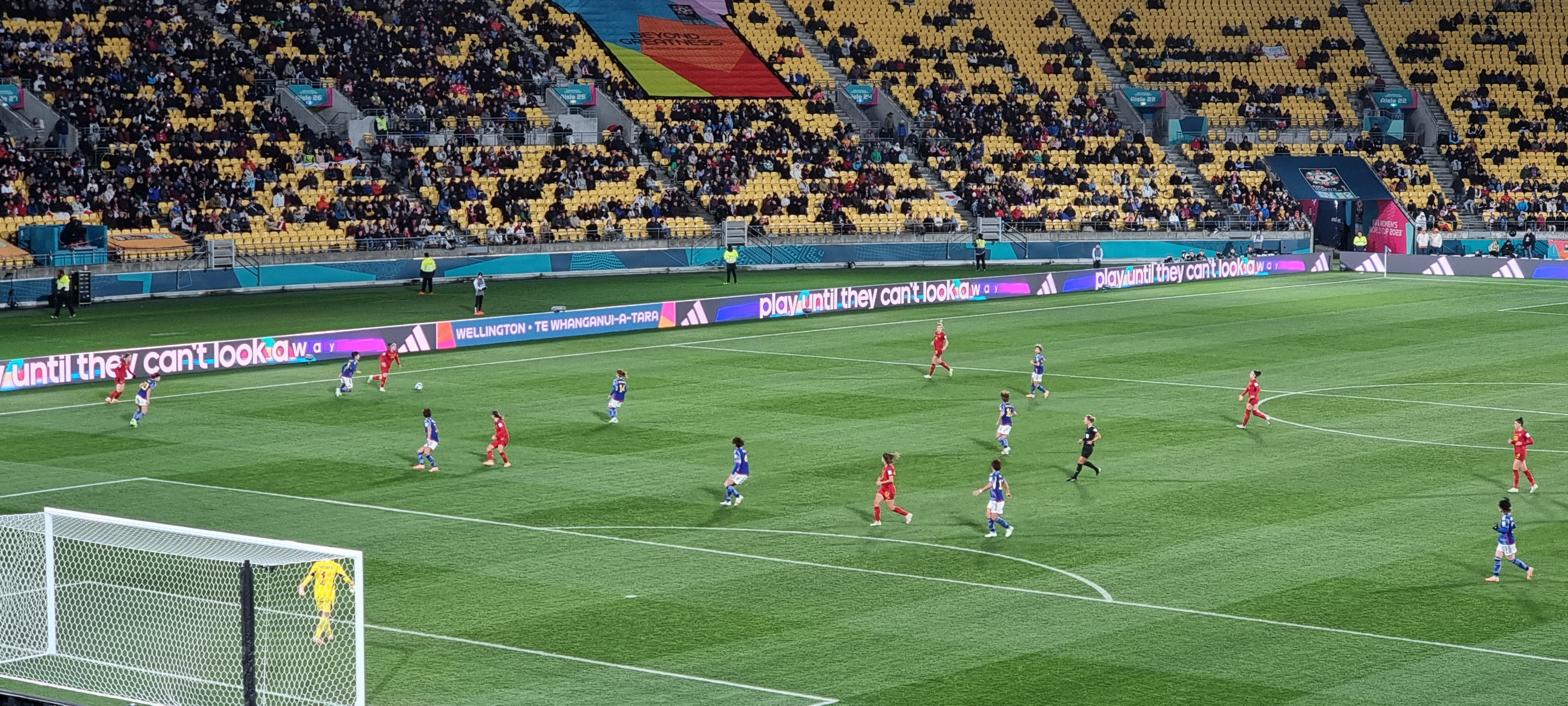
Japan playing against Spain at the 2023 FIFA Women's World Cup

== See also ==
- Basin Reserve – Wellington's other international cricket ground
- List of rugby union stadiums by capacity
- Lists of stadiums
