= Bela Vista Park =

Park in Lisbon, Portugal

Coordinates: 38.749°N 9.126°W

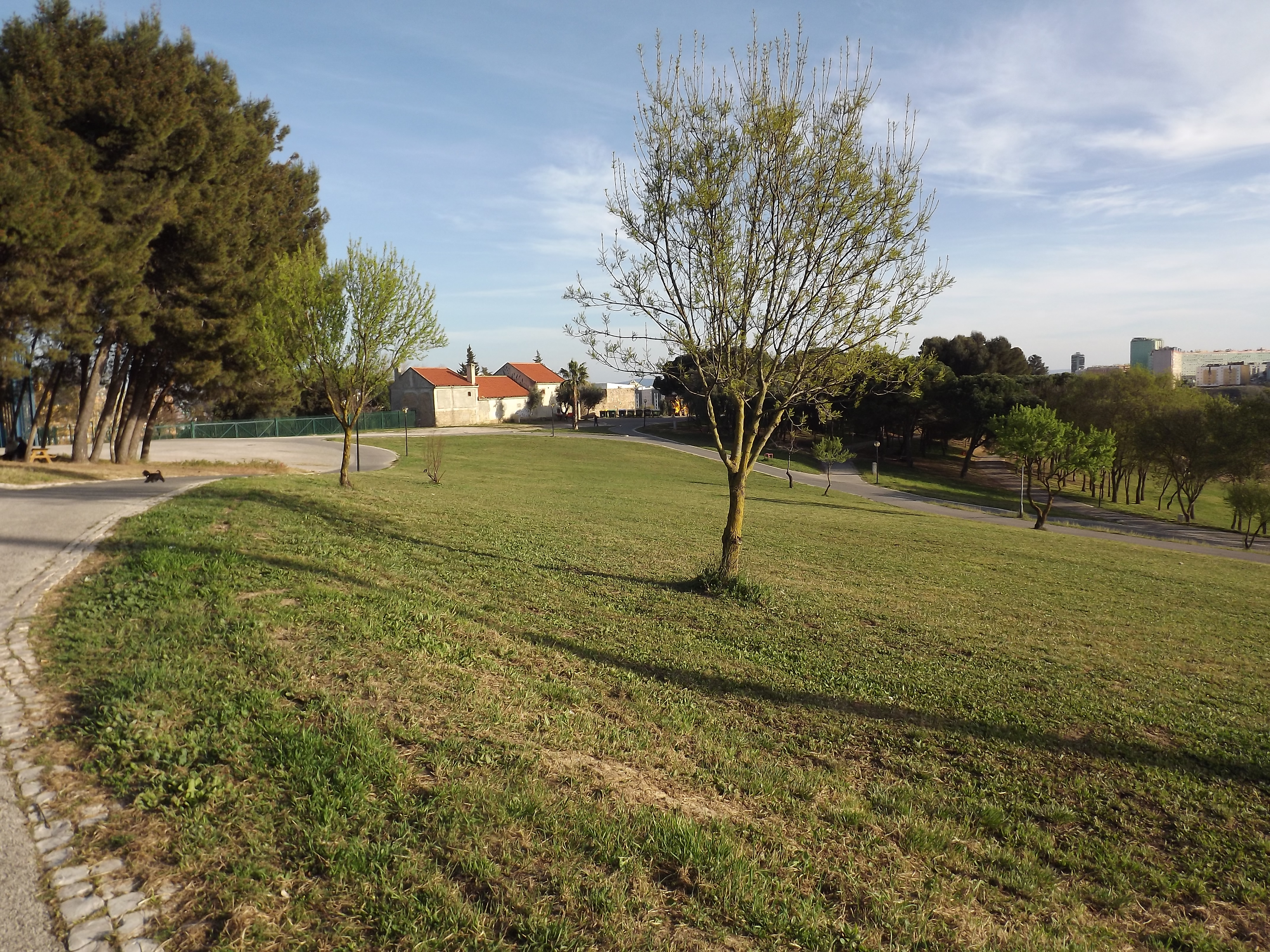
Bela Vista Park

The Bela Vista Park (Portuguese: Parque da Bela Vista) is one of the largest open areas within the city limits of Lisbon, Portugal. "Bela Vista" (Beautiful View) is the name of its adjacent neighborhood. The park comprises an area of 85,000 m^{2} and is often used as a venue for large concerts, including several Rock in Rio events.

Many artists, such as The Rolling Stones, Paul McCartney, Rammstein, Ben Harper, Britney Spears, Roger Waters, Alicia Keys, Shakira, Red Hot Chili Peppers, Sting, Elton John, Amy Winehouse, Lenny Kravitz, Anastacia, A-HA, Bon Jovi, Linkin Park, Guns N' Roses, Muse, Miley Cyrus, MIKA, Queen, Fergie, Maroon 5, Bruce Springsteen, Jessie J, Justin Timberlake, Demi Lovato, Avicii, Ed Sheeran, Charlie Puth, and Metallica have performed there during Rock in Rio. Madonna performed at Bela Vista Park during her Sticky & Sweet Tour on September 14, 2008, in front of 75,000 spectators. On July 31, 2011, Bon Jovi ended their Bon Jovi Live tour at Bela Vista Park in front of a sold-out audience of 57,832 spectators. Katy Perry performed there during her 2017/18 tour Witness: The Tour.
