= Andy Flessas =

American robotics designer

- Born: 1969 (age 56–57); Milwaukee, WI, USA
- Other name: andyRobot
- Education: Columbia College
- Occupation: Robotic designer
- Known for: Robotic entertainment
- Website: andyrobot.com

Andy Flessas (a.k.a. andyRobot) is an American robotics designer and computer animator, and proprietor of the company andyRobot. He invented RoboScreen, a robotically controlled video display, and is the author of RobotAnimator software.

== Early life and education ==
Flessas started studying robotics in the mid-1990's. He trained at ABB's robotic training school. He also trained at KUKA training institute. He has a BA degree in Film Animation from Columbia College Chicago 1991.

Flessas designs advanced robotics motion planning software systems and proprietary hardware for ABB, KUKA, and YASKAWA robots.

== Career ==
Flessas started Casino Arts corporation in 2002 and renamed it to andyRobot in Jan. of 2019. Flessas developed RoboScreen, which was awarded a United States Patent in 2009. The RoboScreen, developed with ABB Robotics, was first used by Bon Jovi in 2009. It was used at Ultra Music Festival in Miami in 2013. It was used by Japanese pop stars Kis-My-Ft2 in 2013.

andyRobot created a robotic piano system for Lady Gaga in 2016. NIKE commissioned andyRobot to create an advanced robotics system in NYC for the 2016 NIKE Innovation Summit.

Flessas also is the creator of RobotAnimator, a plug-in for Autodesk Maya which enables computer animators to generate robotic choreography using the software. Andy also received a United States patent for a collection of Robotic Entertainment Elements primarily a robotic staircase, and robotic video projectors. He also has a patent in South Korea for RoboScreen.

In 2014 WIRED magazine referred to him as "The Robot Whisperer".

In 2015 NASA JPL (Jet Propulsion Laboratory) licensed andyRobot's Robot Animator robotics software for use on the NASA Asteroid Redirect Mission.

In 2017 VERIZON featured andyRobot robotic systems in its television commercial regarding remote robotic surgery using 5G networks.

andyRobot created the first large format entertainment robotics system on a deep ocean vessel "Quantum of the Seas" in 2014, "Anthem of the Seas" in 2015, and "Ovation of the Seas" in 2016 for Royal Caribbean International. andyRobot licensed his proprietary robotics technologies to international pop music producer Deadmau5.

In 2019 APPLE featured andyRobot robotic systems in its "Introducing iPhone 11 Pro" launch commercial.

In 2019 MTV used andyRobot patented RoboScreen robotic video displays on its MTV Video Music Awards 2019.

In 2019 andyRobot collaborated with Bloomingdale's in New York City to create holiday themed window displays featuring robots placing ornaments on holiday trees, a robot band, and an interactive karaoke attraction.
