= October Rage =

Australian rock band

- Origin: Central Coast, New South Wales, Australia
- Genres: Hard rock, rock
- Years active: 2008–present
- Label: Aircastle Records
- Members: Nick Roberts; William Roberts; Kai Chambers; John McMullen
- Past members: Tim Ciantar; Rory Bratby; JB Gilbert; Alan Toka
- Website: www.OctoberRage.com/

October Rage are an Australian rock band, formed in 2008 on the Central Coast of New South Wales, Australia by brothers Nick and Will Roberts. They were winners in a songwriting competition for radio station Triple M Sydney in 2010 and won the opportunity to open for Bon Jovi in Sydney. Following this taste of success recorded the band's debut album, Outrage, released on iTunes September 2011. "Outrage" lead to the "Outrage tour" of the U.S. 2012–13.

== History ==
Nick and William Roberts began the project with a purpose of creating hard hitting, head-banging tunes, stadium rock anthems, and majestic ballads to satisfy even the most avid rock fan.

Returning from an inspiring trip to Los Angeles in late 2008, the brothers set about finding musicians to complement their style of songwriting. Drummer Rory Bratby and Guitarist Tim Ciantar were those musicians.

The newly formed October Rage would travel to Melbourne to record their debut single "Silver Line" with producer Adrian Hannan (Taxiride, The Androids, at The Song Store. The track would be mastered by Martin Pullan (Deep Purple, Ritchie Blackmore) at Edensound.

October Rage would enter "Silver Line" in a competition held by Australian radio station Triple M Sydney and win to play along with Bon Jovi on their world tour at the Sydney Football Stadium in December 2010.

May 2011- Blackstar Amplification officially endorses the band.

July 2011- The band record the debut album "Outrage" in Melbourne at The Song Store with Adrian Hannan producing and mastering by Martin Pullan at Edensound.

September 2011- "Outrage" is released on iTunes "Set You Free" music video is released.

24 May 2012- iTunes release of the "White Walkers" single. By July it was number 1 on Untapped Radio. A platform for unsigned bands from all over the world.

June 2012- "Outrage US Tour" commences in Mississippi.

July 2012- Guitarist Tim Ciantar announced his departure from October Rage, advising he would finish with the band after the first leg of their US Outrage Tour.

August 2012- Drummer Rory Bratby announced his departure from October Rage, advising he would finish with the band after the first leg of their US Outrage Tour.

30 August 2012- October Rage announces American guitarist Josh Gilbert has joined the band to fulfil touring commitments.

10 September 2012- October Rage announce American drummer Alan Toka has joined the band to fulfil touring commitments.

February 2013- The band part ways with Gilbert and Toka after a largely successful first US tour.

28 September 2013- The band storm back onto the Australian touring circuit with a fresh all Australian lineup including multi instrumentalist John McMullen and drummer Kai Chambers.

February 2014- The new look October Rage head south to Melbourne and Adrian Hannan to record the "Fallout, Dust And Guns" EP this time using Mad Cat and The Song Store studios. Mixed and Mastered by Stan Martell at Martell Studios Georgia U.S.

8 July 2014- The band embarks on the Fallout, Dust And Guns US Tour.

14 September 2014-The band debuted their entire album on the Les and Lady J show on ClassX Radio in Cincinnati,Ohio.

15 September 2014- "Fallout, Dust And Guns" EP is released on iTunes

30 September 2014- October Rage join American rockers Bobaflex and Royal Bliss on the Rock Avengers US Tour in Charleston, South Carolina.

12 December 2014- The band returns to Australia after a very successful 5 months US tour covering 36 states.

22 January 2015- "Valkyrie" music video is released produced by Vokta shot by Greg Sher.

28 October 2018- After a family emergency the band returns to Australia and takes a hiatus.The bands driving force and songwriter Nicholas Roberts continues to perform solo acoustic shows around New South Wales, Australia.

== American Tours ==
The band started their American tour in June 2012. Starting in the southern and south eastern states. During this leg of the tour the band have played alongside many bands most notably Sevendust.

August 2012, the tour moved to the west coast where the band played as a supporting role for Steel Panther.

September 2012, the tour continued back through the mid west, southern and south eastern states where they played as a supporting role for Saliva.

Summer 2014 the band embarked on the much anticipated "Fallout, Dust And Guns" US Tour. Playing relentlessly throughout the mid west. In the fall of 2014, they joined the "Rock Avengers Tour" alongside Royal Bliss and Bobaflex. By the winter of 2014 October Rage had travelled back and forth across North America covering California, Colorado, Connecticut, Delaware, Georgia, Idaho, Illinois, Indiana, Iowa, Kansas, Kentucky, Maryland, Massachusetts, Michigan, Minnesota, Missouri, Nebraska, New Jersey, New York, North Dakota, Ohio, Oklahoma, Pennsylvania, Rhode Island, South Carolina, South Dakota, Tennessee, Texas, Utah, Virginia, West Virginia, Wyoming. In under 5 months.

The band completed extensive tours throughout the United States in 2016,2017 & 2018 before a family medical emergency forced the band to take a hiatus and return to Australia.

== Present ==
The band is currently on an indefinite hiatus.

Nicholas Roberts, singer and songwriter for the band is performing solo acoustic shows in New South Wales, Australia.
