= Bryan Adams discography =

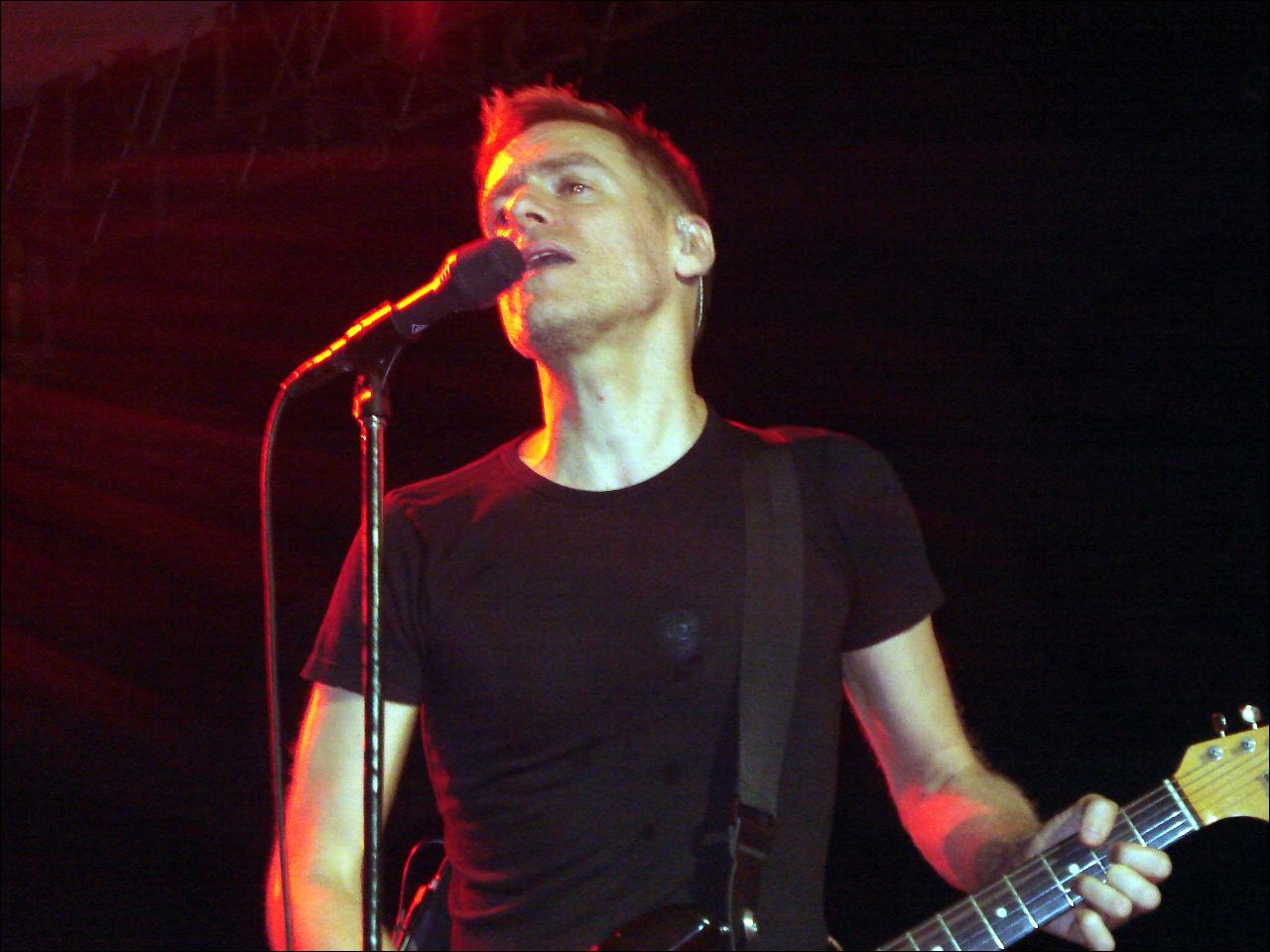
- Adams in 1990
- Studio albums: 16
- Extended plays: 2
- Soundtrack albums: 2
- Live albums: 7
- Compilation albums: 6
- Singles: 79

Canadian singer Bryan Adams has released 16 studio releases, six compilation albums, two soundtrack albums, seven live albums, and 79 singles. After the success of his debut single, "Let Me Take You Dancing" (1979), Adams signed a recording contract with A&M Records. Bryan Adams (1980), his debut album, peaked at number 69 on the Canadian RPM Albums Chart. Adams followed this with You Want It You Got It (1981), which peaked at number 118 on the Billboard 200 and was certified gold in Canada. Cuts Like a Knife, his third release, became his first successful work outside Canada. The album charted within the top 10 in Canada and the United States and was certified three-times platinum by the Canadian Recording Industry Association (CRIA) and platinum by the Recording Industry Association of America (RIAA). Reckless (1984), his fourth studio album, selling over 12 million copies worldwide and featured the hit singles "Run to You", "Heaven" and "Summer of '69". In 1987, he released Into the Fire, which reached platinum status in the United States and triple-platinum in Canada.

Adams entered the 1990s with the release of Waking Up the Neighbours (1991), which contained "(Everything I Do) I Do It for You", the theme song for the film Robin Hood: Prince of Thieves. It went on to sell more than 15 million copies worldwide, making it Adams's most successful song, and one of the best-selling singles of all time. The album was sold in approximately 16 million copies, including being certified diamond in Canada. He also released his first greatest hits compilation, So Far So Good, in 1993. This album topped the charts in nine countries and was certified six-times platinum and seven-times platinum by the RIAA and CRIA respectively. His seventh studio album, 18 til I Die, was released in 1996. It sold five million copies worldwide and was certified platinum in the United States. MTV Unplugged, an acoustic live album released in 1997, reached the top 10 in four countries while selling two million copies in Europe. Adams' eighth studio album, On a Day Like Today (1998), was certified double-platinum by the CRIA and platinum by the IFPI Platinum Europe Awards. His second compilation album, The Best of Me (1999), sold two million copies in Europe and went three-times platinum in Canada.

Spirit: Stallion of the Cimarron (2002) was certified gold by the RIAA and included the hit single "Here I Am". Room Service (2004), his ninth studio album, peaked at number 134 on the Billboard 200 and sold only 44,000 copies in the United States. However, it topped the album charts in Germany and Switzerland. Adams' third greatest hits compilation, Anthology, was released in 2005. 11 (2008), Adams' tenth studio album, peaked at number 80 on the Billboard 200 and became his third number-one album in Canada. Although it did not receive any certifications in Canada or the United Kingdom, the album sold over half-a-million units worldwide. In 2015, the thirteenth studio album Get Up was released; it reached the first position of the ranking in Switzerland, the second position in the UK and the third position in Germany. In September 2017, Adams announced via social media the release of a new compilation called Ultimate featuring 19 of his greatest hits and two new songs, "Please Stay" and "Ultimate Love". Shine a Light is the Canadian singer-songwriter's 14th studio album, which was released on March 1, 2019. The album debuted at number one on the Canadian Albums Chart.; second place in the United Kingdom, Switzerland, Austria and New Zealand; the third position in Germany. According to the RIAA, Adams' album and singles sales have been certified at over 22 million copies while globally, he has sold between 75 and 100 million records.

== Albums ==
=== Studio albums ===
List of albums, with selected chart positions and certifications
Title	Album details	Peak chart positions										Certifications
Title	Album details	CAN	AUS	AUT	GER	NLD	NOR	SWE	SWI	UK	US	Certifications
Bryan Adams	Released: February 12, 1980; Label: A&M; Formats: LP, cassette	69	—	—	—	—	—	—	—	—	—	
You Want It You Got It	Released: July 28, 1981; Label: A&M; Formats: LP, cassette	50	—	—	—	—	—	—	—	78	118	MC: Gold
Cuts Like a Knife	Released: January 18, 1983; Label: A&M; Formats: CD, LP, cassette	8	32	—	24	—	—	22	—	21	8	MC: 3× Platinum; ARIA: Gold; BPI: Silver; IFPI SWI: Gold; RIAA: Platinum
Reckless	Released: November 5, 1984; Label: A&M; Formats: CD, LP, cassette	1	2	—	19	11	2	5	10	7	1	MC: Diamond; ARIA: Platinum; BPI: 3× Platinum; BVMI: Gold; IFPI AUT: Gold; IFPI SWI: Platinum; NVPI: Platinum; RIAA: 5× Platinum
Into the Fire	Released: March 30, 1987; Label: A&M; Formats: CD, LP, cassette	2	14	13	7	18	4	3	4	10	7	MC: 3× Platinum; BPI: Gold; IFPI SWI: Platinum; RIAA: Platinum
Waking Up the Neighbours	Released: September 24, 1991; Label: A&M; Formats: CD, LP, cassette	1	1	1	1	2	1	1	1	1	6	MC: Diamond; ARIA: 4× Platinum; BPI: 3× Platinum; BVMI: Platinum; IFPI AUT: Platinum; IFPI SWI: 4× Platinum; NVPI: Platinum; RIAA: 4× Platinum
18 til I Die	Released: June 4, 1996; Label: A&M; Formats: CD, LP, cassette	4	2	2	4	9	7	5	2	1	31	MC: 3× Platinum; ARIA: 3× Platinum; BPI: 2× Platinum; BVMI: Gold; IFPI AUT: Gold; IFPI SWI: Platinum; RIAA: Platinum
On a Day Like Today	Released: October 27, 1998; Label: A&M; Formats: CD, LP, cassette	3	38	4	5	24	34	27	2	11	103	MC: 2× Platinum; BPI: Gold; BVMI: Gold; IFPI AUT: Gold; IFPI SWI: Platinum
Spirit: Stallion of the Cimarron (with Hans Zimmer)	Released: May 14, 2002; Label: A&M; Formats: CD, cassette	—	94	6	7	22	19	24	6	8	40	BPI: Gold; IFPI SWI: Gold; RIAA: Gold
Room Service	Released: September 20, 2004; Label: Polydor; Formats: CD, digital download	2	15	3	1	3	18	19	1	4	134	MC: Platinum; BPI: Gold; BVMI: Gold; IFPI SWI: Gold
11	Released: March 17, 2008; Label: Polydor; Formats: CD, digital download	1	35	2	2	8	39	30	1	6	80	BPI: Silver; IFPI SWI: Gold
Tracks of My Years	Released: September 30, 2014; Label: Verve; Formats: CD, digital download	1	61	5	5	41	—	—	6	11	89	MC: Gold
Get Up	Released: October 2, 2015; Label: UME; Formats: CD, LP, digital download	8	6	4	3	13	33	9	1	2	99	BPI: Silver
Shine a Light	Released: March 1, 2019; Label: UME; Formats: CD, LP, digital download	1	7	2	3	37	—	—	2	2	—	MC: Gold
So Happy It Hurts	Released: March 11, 2022; Label: BMG; Formats: CD, LP, digital download	29	75	3	2	28	—	—	2	3	—	
Roll with the Punches	Released: August 29, 2025; Formats: CD, LP, digital download	—	62	6	6	71	—	—	6	3	—	
How's It Goin'	Released: November 6, 2026; Formats: CD, LP, digital download	93	48	2	3	—	—	—	2	24	—	
"—" denotes items which were not released in that country or failed to chart.

=== Special self-released digital studio albums ===
List of special self-released digital studio albums
Title	Album details
Pretty Woman – The Musical	Released: March 4, 2022; Label: Badams; Formats: CD, digital download
Classic	Released: April 1, 2022; Label: Badams, BMG (LP); Formats: Digital download, streaming, LP
Classic Pt. II	Released: July 29, 2022; Label: Badams; Formats: Digital download, streaming
A Great Big Holiday Jam (with friends)	Released: December 8, 2025; Label: Badams; Formats: digital download
Tough Town	Released: July 24, 2026; Label: Badams; Formats: digital download, CD, LP

=== Live albums ===
Title	Album details	Peak chart positions										Certifications
Title	Album details	CAN	AUS	AUT	GER	NLD	NOR	SWE	SWI	UK	US	Certifications
Live! Live! Live!	Released: 1988; Label: A&M; Formats: CD, LP, cassette	—	—	17	26	57	—	22	21	17	—	MC: Gold; BPI: Silver
MTV Unplugged	Released: December 9, 1997; Label: A&M; Formats: CD, LP, cassette	10	28	7	8	15	22	54	3	19	88	ARIA: Gold; BPI: Platinum; BVMI: Gold; IFPI AUT: Gold; IFPI SWI: Platinum
Live at the Budokan	Released: June 17, 2003; Label: A&M; Formats: CD, digital download	—	—	—	—	—	—	—	—	—	—	
Bare Bones	Released: October 29, 2010; Label: Polydor; Formats: CD, digital download	18	38	19	28	52	—	—	20	35	—	MC: Gold
Live at Sydney Opera House	Released: September 2, 2013; Label: Polydor; Formats: CD, digital download	—	—	—	38	—	—	—	—	—	—	
Wembley 1996	Released: June 30, 2017; Label: Eagle Rock Entertainment; Formats: CD, digital download	—	—	—	—	—	—	—	—	—	—	
Live at the Royal Albert Hall 2023	Released: December 8, 2023; Label: BMG; Formats: 3×CD+Blu, 4×LP, digital download	—	—	53	20	—	—	—	26	—	—	
Live at the Royal Albert Hall 2024	Released: November 15, 2024; Label: BMG; Formats: 3×CD+Blu, 4×LP, digital download	—	—	—	—	—	—	—	—	—	—	
"—" denotes items which were not released in that country or failed to chart.

=== Special self-released digital live albums ===
List of special self-released digital studio albums
Title	Album details
Cuts Like a Knife – 40th Anniversary, Live from the Royal Albert Hall	Released: February 3, 2023; Label: Badams; Formats: Digital download
Waking Up the Neighbours – Live from the Royal Albert Hall	Released: December 8, 2023; Label: Badams; Formats: Digital download
Into the Fire – Live from the Royal Albert Hall	Released: December 8, 2023; Label: Badams; Formats: Digital download

=== Compilation albums ===
Title	Album details	Peak chart positions										Certifications
Title	Album details	CAN	AUS	AUT	GER	NLD	NOR	SWE	SWI	UK	US	Certifications
Hits on Fire	Released: 1988; Label: A&M; Formats: CD, LP, CS (cassette)	—	—	—	—	—	—	—	—	—	—	
So Far So Good	Released: November 2, 1993; Label: A&M; Formats: CD, LP, CS	1	1	1	1	1	1	1	1	1	6	MC: 7× Platinum; ARIA: 14× Platinum; BPI: 3× Platinum; BVMI: 2× Platinum; IFPI AUT: 2× Platinum; IFPI NOR: 3× Platinum; IFPI SWI: 4× Platinum; NVPI: 2× Platinum; RIAA: 6× Platinum; RMNZ: Gold
The Best of Me	Released: November 15, 1999; Label: A&M; Formats: CD, LP, CS	7	18	4	7	13	2	20	3	12	—	MC: 3× Platinum; ARIA: Platinum; BPI: 3× Platinum; BVMI: Gold; IFPI AUT: Gold; IFPI NOR: Gold; IFPI SWI: Platinum
Anthology	Released: October 18, 2005; Label: A&M; Formats: CD, digital download	4	55	28	30	—	10	5	39	29	65	MC: 2× Platinum; BPI: Platinum; BVMI: Gold
Icon	Released: August 31, 2010; Label: Universal; Formats: CD, digital download	32	—	—	—	—	—	—	—	—	—	MC: Gold
Ultimate	Release date: November 3, 2017; Label: Polydor; Formats: CD, LP, digital download	80	82	—	—	129	—	—	52	11	—	BPI: Gold
"—" denotes items which were not released in that country or failed to chart.

== Extended plays ==
Title	EP details	Peak chart positions
Title	EP details	CAN
Colour Me Kubrick	Released: 2005; Label: Universal; Formats: CD, digital download	—
Christmas	Released: November 15, 2019; Label: Badams; Formats: Digital download, streaming	80

== Singles ==
=== 1970s–1980s ===
List of singles, with selected chart positions and certifications, showing year released and album name
Single	Year	Peak chart positions											Certifications	Album
Single	Year	CAN	AUS	AUT	GER	IRE	NLD	SWE	SWI	UK	US	US Main.	Certifications	Album
"Let Me Take You Dancing"^{[A]}	1978	62	—	—	—	—	—	—	—	—	—	—		Non-album single
"Hidin' from Love"	1980	64	—	—	—	—	—	—	—	—	—	—		Bryan Adams
"Give Me Your Love"	1980	91	—	—	—	—	—	—	—	—	—	—		Bryan Adams
"Lonely Nights"	1981	—	—	—	—	—	—	—	—	—	84	3		You Want It You Got It
"Coming Home"	1981	—	—	—	—	—	—	—	—	—	—	—		You Want It You Got It
"Fits Ya Good"	1981	30	—	—	—	—	—	—	—	—	—	15		You Want It You Got It
"Jealousy"	1981	—	—	—	—	—	—	—	—	—	—	—		You Want It You Got It
"Let Him Know"	1982	—	—	—	—	—	—	—	—	—	—	—		Cuts Like a Knife
"Straight from the Heart"	1983	20	98	—	—	—	—	—	—	51	10	32		Cuts Like a Knife
"Cuts Like a Knife"	1983	12	55	—	—	—	22	—	—	—	15	6		Cuts Like a Knife
"This Time"	1983	32	—	—	—	28	18	—	—	41	24	21		Cuts Like a Knife
"Take Me Back"	1983	—	—	—	—	—	—	—	—	—	—	21		Cuts Like a Knife
"The Only One"	1983	—	—	—	—	—	—	—	—	—	—	44		Cuts Like a Knife
"I'm Ready"	1983	—	—	—	—	—	—	—	—	—	—	24		Cuts Like a Knife
"The Best Was Yet to Come"	1983	—	—	—	—	—	—	—	—	—	—	—		Cuts Like a Knife
"Tonight"	1984	—	—	—	—	—	—	—	—	—	—	—		You Want It You Got It
"Run to You"	1984	4	24	—	—	8	14	—	—	11	6	1	MC: Gold; BPI: Platinum; RMNZ: Platinum	Reckless
"Kids Wanna Rock"	1984	—	—	—	—	—	—	—	—	—	—	42		Reckless
"Somebody"	1985	13	76	—	—	20	24	—	—	35	11	1		Reckless
"Heaven"	1985	11	12	—	28	11	28	8	14	38	1	9	MC: Gold; BPI: Platinum; RMNZ: 2× Platinum	Reckless
"Summer of '69"	1985	11	14	17	62	18	4	13	—	42	5	40	ARIA: 8× Platinum; BPI: 3× Platinum; BVMI: 3× Gold; RMNZ: 8× Platinum	Reckless
"One Night Love Affair"	1985	19	85	—	—	—	12	—	—	—	13	7		Reckless
"It's Only Love" (with Tina Turner)	1985	14	57	30	44	16	21	5	16	29	15	7		Reckless
"Diana"	1985	—	—	—	—	—	—	—	—	—	—	21		Non-album singles
"Christmas Time"^{[B]}	1985	39	64	17	14	26	33	19	18	55	—	31	MC: Platinum	Non-album singles
"Heat of the Night"	1987	7	25	—	33	—	34	7	17	50	6	2	MC: Gold	Into the Fire
"Hearts on Fire"	1987	25	89	—	—	—	22	—	—	57	26	3		Into the Fire
"Another Day"	1987	—	—	—	—	—	—	—	—	—	—	33		Into the Fire
"Into the Fire"	1987	—	—	—	—	—	—	—	—	—	—	6		Into the Fire
"Victim of Love"	1987	49	92	—	—	—	—	—	—	68	32	10		Into the Fire
"Only the Strong Survive"	1987	64	—	—	—	—	—	—	—	—	—	—		Into the Fire
"—" denotes single that did not chart or was not released

=== 1990s ===
List of singles, with selected chart positions and certifications, showing year released and album name
Single	Year	Peak chart positions											Certifications	Album
Single	Year	CAN	AUS	AUT	GER	IRE	NLD	SWE	SWI	UK	US	US Main.	Certifications	Album
"Young Lust"	1990	—	—	—	—	—	—	—	—	—	—	7		The Wall: Live in Berlin
"(Everything I Do) I Do It for You"	1991	1	1	1	1	1	1	1	1	1	1	10	MC: 2× Platinum; ARIA: 2× Platinum; BPI: 2× Platinum; BVMI: Platinum; IFPI AUT: Platinum; RIAA: 3× Platinum; RMNZ: 2× Platinum	Waking Up the Neighbours
"Can't Stop This Thing We Started"	1991	1	9	14	14	4	10	3	8	12	2	2	MC: Gold; RIAA: Gold	Waking Up the Neighbours
"There Will Never Be Another Tonight"	1991	2	30	—	—	11	29	33	—	32	31	6		Waking Up the Neighbours
"Thought I'd Died and Gone to Heaven"	1992	1	13	—	47	11	10	—	—	8	13	14		Waking Up the Neighbours
"Touch the Hand"	1992	37	—	—	—	—	—	—	—	—	—	13		Waking Up the Neighbours
"All I Want Is You"	1992	—	31	—	—	20	26	—	—	22	—	—		Waking Up the Neighbours
"Do I Have to Say the Words?"	1992	2	61	—	75	—	34	—	—	30	11	—		Waking Up the Neighbours
"Please Forgive Me"	1993	1	1	2	3	1	3	2	2	2	7	—	ARIA: 2× Platinum; BPI: Gold; BVMI: Gold; IFPI AUT: Gold; RMNZ: Gold	So Far So Good
"All for Love" (with Rod Stewart and Sting)	1993	1	1	1	1	1	3	1	1	2	1	—	ARIA: Platinum; BPI: Silver; BVMI: Gold; RIAA: Platinum; RMNZ: Gold	The Three Musketeers
"Summer of '69"	1994	—	—	—	—	—	—	—	—	—	—	—		Live! Live! Live!
"Have You Ever Really Loved a Woman?"	1995	1	1	1	3	3	2	6	1	4	1	—	ARIA: Platinum; BPI: Silver; BVMI: Gold; IFPI AUT: Gold; RMNZ: Gold	Don Juan DeMarco
"Rock Steady" (with Bonnie Raitt)	1995	17	117	—	—	—	—	—	—	50	73	—		Road Tested
"The Only Thing That Looks Good on Me Is You"	1996	1	19	17	44	26	21	24	5	6	52	—		18 til I Die
"Let's Make a Night to Remember"	1996	1	7	34	57	25	—	39	41	10	24	—	ARIA: Gold	18 til I Die
"Star"	1996	—	—	—	76	—	22	—	—	13	—	—		18 til I Die
"I Finally Found Someone" (with Barbra Streisand)	1996	18	2	23	53	1	16	9	17	10	8	—	ARIA: Platinum; BPI: Silver; RIAA: Gold	The Mirror Has Two Faces / 18 til I Die
"18 til I Die"	1996	21	—	—	85	—	86	—	—	22	—	—		18 til I Die
"Do to You"	1997	6	—	—	—	—	—	—	—	—	—	—		18 til I Die
"I'll Always Be Right There"	1997	14	—	—	—	—	—	—	—	—	—	—		18 til I Die
"Back to You"	1997	1	38	—	62	—	77	56	—	18	—	38		MTV Unplugged
"I'm Ready"	1998	11	—	—	66	—	24	—	—	20	—	—		MTV Unplugged
"On a Day Like Today"^{[C]}	1998	1	60	32	53	—	66	—	32	13	—	—		On a Day Like Today
"When You're Gone" (with Melanie C)	1998	13	4	14	14	3	7	8	11	3	—	—	ARIA: Platinum; BPI: 2× Platinum; IFPI NOR: Gold; RMNZ: Platinum	On a Day Like Today
"Cloud Number Nine"	1999	7	67	13	33	16	62	43	26	6	—	—	BPI: Silver	On a Day Like Today
"The Best of Me"	1999	10	—	37	65	—	67	—	31	47	—	—		The Best of Me
"—" denotes single that did not chart or was not released

=== 2000s ===
List of singles, with selected chart positions and certifications, showing year released and album name
Single	Year	Peak chart positions										Certifications	Album
Single	Year	CAN	CAN AC	AUS	AUT	GER	IRE	NLD	SWE	SWI	UK	Certifications	Album
"Don't Give Up" (Chicane featuring Bryan Adams)^{[D]}	2000	—	—	6	—	24	11	21	51	42	1	ARIA: Gold; BPI: Gold	Behind the Sun / The Best of Me
"Inside Out"	2000	17	—	—	—	66	—	91	—	53	—		On a Day Like Today
"Here I Am"	2002	—	—	86	12	17	15	30	15	24	5		Spirit: Stallion of the Cimarron
"Open Road"	2004	—	—	—	35	23	50	28	—	17	21		Room Service
"Flying"	2004	—	—	—	—	68	—	86	—	51	39		Room Service
"Room Service"	2005	—	—	—	—	74	—	—	—	—	—		Room Service
"This Side of Paradise"	2005	—	—	—	—	—	—	—	—	—	—		Room Service
"Why Do You Have to Be So Hard to Love?"	2005	—	15	—	—	—	—	—	—	—	—		Room Service
"When You're Gone" (with Pamela Anderson)	2005	—	—	—	—	—	—	—	—	—	—		Anthology
"So Far So Good"	2005	—	—	—	—	—	—	—	—	—	—		Anthology
"Ce n'était qu'un rêve" (with Emmanuelle Seigner)	2006	—	—	—	—	—	—	—	—	—	—		Room Service
"I Thought I'd Seen Everything"	2008	47	3	—	41	55	—	—	—	52	146		11
"Tonight We Have the Stars"	2008	—	—	—	—	—	—	—	—	—	—		11
"She's Got a Way"	2008	—	9	—	—	—	—	—	—	—	—		11
"You've Been a Friend to Me"	2009	—	12	—	—	—	—	—	—	—	—		Old Dogs
"—" denotes single that did not chart or was not released

=== 2010s ===
List of singles, with selected chart positions and certifications, showing year released and album name
Single	Year	Peak chart positions							Certifications	Album
Single	Year	CAN	CAN AC	AUT	GER	SWE	UK	US AC	Certifications	Album
"One World, One Flame"	2010	—	—	70	44	—	—	—		Non-album singles
"Bang the Drum"	2010	—	—	—	—	—	—	—		Non-album singles
"I Still Miss You...A Little Bit"	2010	—	—	—	—	—	—	—		Bare Bones
"Alberta Bound"	2011	100	—	—	—	—	—	—		Non-album singles
"Merry Christmas"	2011	—	4	—	—	—	—	—		Non-album singles
"Tonight in Babylon" (Loverush UK featuring Bryan Adams)	2012	—	—	—	—	—	—	—		Non-album singles
"After All" (Michael Bublé featuring Bryan Adams)	2013	96	7	—	—	—	—	—		To Be Loved
"She Knows Me"	2014	—	—	—	—	—	—	23		Tracks of My Years
"You Belong to Me"	2015	—	—	—	—	—	181	26		Get Up
"Brand New Day"	2015	—	—	—	—	—	—	25		Get Up
"Don't Even Try"	2015	—	—	—	—	—	—	—		Get Up
"Do What Ya Gotta Do"	2016	—	—	—	—	—	—	—		Get Up
"Please Stay"	2017	—	24	—	—	—	—	—		Ultimate
"Shine a Light"	2019	—	14	—	—	—	— (Note: "Shine a Light" did not enter the UK Singles Chart but debuted and peaked at number 63 on the UK Singles Downloads Chart.)	—		Shine a Light
"That's How Strong Our Love Is" (featuring Jennifer Lopez)	2019	—	—	—	—	—	—			Shine a Light
"Je reviendrai vers toi" / "I Will Always Return"	2019	—	—	—	—	—	—	—		Non-album single
"Joe and Mary"	2019	—	—	—	—	—	—	—		Christmas
"Christmas (Baby Please Come Home)" (with Robbie Williams)	2019	—	—	—	—	106	—	—		The Christmas Present
"—" denotes single that did not chart or was not released

=== 2020s ===
List of singles, with selected chart positions, showing year released and album name
Single	Year	Peak chart positions			Album
Single	Year	CAN	SWI	UK	Album
"Lean on Me" (as part of ArtistsCAN)	2020	1	—	—	Non-album singles
"Stop Crying Your Heart Out" (as part of BBC Radio 2's Allstars)	2020	—	—	7	Non-album singles
"So Happy It Hurts"	2021	—	85	—	So Happy It Hurts
"On the Road"	2021	—	—	—	So Happy It Hurts
"Kick Ass"	2021	—	—	—	So Happy It Hurts
"Never Gonna Rain"	2022	—	—	—	So Happy It Hurts
"Let's Get Christmas Going"	2022	—	—	—	Non-album singles
"The Thing That Wrecks You" (with Tenille Townes)	2023	—	—	—	Non-album singles
"What If There Were No Sides at All"	2023	—	—	—	Non-album singles
"You're Awesome"	2023	—	—	—	Office Race (soundtrack)
"Sometimes You Lose Before You Win"	2023	—	—	—	Office Race (soundtrack)
"Someone's Daughter, Someone's Son"	2024	—	—	—	Non-album singles
"Rock and Roll Hell"	2024	—	—	—	Non-album singles
"War Machine"	2024	—	—	—	Non-album singles
"Roll with the Punches"	2025	—	—	—	Roll with the Punches
"Make Up Your Mind"	2025	—	—	—	Roll with the Punches
"Never Ever Let You Go"	2025	—	—	—	Roll with the Punches
"It's Only Love" (with Tina Turner) (Record Store Day 2025)	2025	—	—	—	Reckless
"A Little More Understanding"	2025	—	—	—	Roll with the Punches
"California Christmas" (with Friends)	2025	—	—	—	Bryan Adams & Friends: A Great Big Holiday Jam.
"51st State"	2026	—	—	—	How's It Goin'
"The Ballad of Terry Fox"	2026	—	—	—	Run Terry Run
"How's It Goin'"	2026	—	—	—	How's It Goin'
"Lake Ontario"	2026	—	—	—	How's It Goin'
"—" denotes single that did not chart or was not released

Notes

  - A "Let Me Take You Dancing" peaked at 18 on the RPM Dance/Urban Chart, but peaked at 62 on their singles chart. It also peaked at #22 on Billboard's Disco Top 80.
  - B According to co-writer Jim Vallance, "Christmas Time" did not chart on the RPM chart, but instead on a chart known as The Record.
  - C "On a Day Like Today" peaked at 14 on the Billboard Canadian Singles Chart in 1998.
  - D "Don't Give Up" charted in Canada only on the RPM Dance/Urban chart at 9.

== Guest appearances ==
List of non-single guest appearances, with other performing artists, showing year released and album name
Title	Year	Other artist(s)	Album
"Roxy Roller"	1976	Sweeney Todd	Non-album single
"Wastin' Time"	1977	Sweeney Todd	If Wishes Were Horses
"Say Hello Say Goodbye"	1977	Sweeney Todd	If Wishes Were Horses
"Shut Up"	1977	Sweeney Todd	If Wishes Were Horses
"Until I Find You"	1977	Sweeney Todd	If Wishes Were Horses
"All of a Sudden"	1977	Sweeney Todd	If Wishes Were Horses
"No.5243605 Smith"	1977	Sweeney Todd	If Wishes Were Horses
"Song for a Star"	1977	Sweeney Todd	If Wishes Were Horses
"Tantalize"	1977	Sweeney Todd	If Wishes Were Horses
"If Wishes Were Horses"	1977	Sweeney Todd	If Wishes Were Horses
"Pushin' and Shovin'"	1977	Sweeney Todd	If Wishes Were Horses
"You Walked Away Again"	1979	Prism	Armageddon
"Take It or Leave It"	1979	Prism	Armageddon
"Tears Are Not Enough"	1985	Northern Lights	We Are the World
"Let Me Down Easy"	1985	Roger Daltrey	Under a Raging Moon
"Rebel"	1985	Roger Daltrey	Under a Raging Moon
"Don't Forget Me"	1986	Glass Tiger	The Thin Red Line
"I Will Be There"	1986	Glass Tiger	The Thin Red Line
"Back Where You Started"	1986	Tina Turner	Break Every Rule
Guitar	1986	Various Artists	The Prince's Trust Concert 1986
"Run Rudolph Run"	1987	Various Artists	A Very Special Christmas
"Run to You"	1987	Various Artists	The Prince's Trust Concert 1987
"The Wanderer"(with Dave Edmunds)	1987	Various Artists	The Prince's Trust Concert 1987
"It's Only Love"	1988	Tina Turner	Tina Live in Europe
"Whatever It Takes"	1989	Belinda Carlisle	Runaway Horses
"When the Night Comes"	1989	Joe Cocker	One Night of Sin
"Sticky Sweet"	1989	Mötley Crüe	Dr. Feelgood
"Smoke on the Water"	1989	Various Artists	Rock Aid Armenia
"Don't Let This Love Go Down"	1989	Cidny Bullens	Cindy Bullens
"River of Love"	1990	David Foster	River of Love
"Empty Spaces/What Shall We Do Now?"	1990	Roger Waters	The Wall – Live in Berlin
"Young Lust"	1990	Roger Waters	The Wall – Live in Berlin
"The Tide Is Turning"	1990	Roger Waters	The Wall – Live in Berlin
"Too Much Too Young"	1993	Little Angels	Jam
"Please Forgive Me"	1994	Luciano Pavarotti	Pavarotti & Friends
"'O sole mio"	1994	Luciano Pavarotti	Pavarotti & Friends
"All for Love"	1994	Luciano Pavarotti	Pavarotti & Friends
"Libiamo ne' lieti calici"	1994	Luciano Pavarotti	Pavarotti & Friends
"It's Only Love"	1994	Tina Turner	The Collected Recordings – Sixties to Nineties
"Rock Steady"	1995	Bonnie Raitt	Road Tested
"Prove It"	1995	Stevie Vann	Stevie Vann
"All for Love"	1996	Rod Stewart	If We Fall in Love Tonight
"What Would It Take"	1997	Anne Murray	An Intimate Evening with Anne Murray
"Somewhere Between Heaven and Earth"	1999	Cidny Bullens	Somewhere Between Heaven and Earth
"Don't Give Up"	2000	Chicane	Behind the Sun
"Sad Songs"	2000	Elton John	Elton John One Night Only
"Raised on Robbery" (with Wynonna Judd)	2000	Joni Mitchell	An All-Star Tribute to Joni Mitchell
"All for Love"	2001	Rod Stewart	The Story So Far: The Very Best of Rod Stewart
"I Finally Found Someone"	2002	Barbra Streisand	The Essential Barbra Streisand
"I Finally Found Someone"	2002	Barbra Streisand	Duets
"Behind Blue Eyes"	2003	The Who	Live at the Royal Albert Hall
"See Me, Feel Me"	2003	The Who	Live at the Royal Albert Hall
"It's Only Love"	2004	Tina Turner	All the Best
"It's Only Love"	2005	Tina Turner	All the Best – The Live Collection
"Io vivo (in te)"	2005	Zucchero Fornaciari	Zu & Co. - The Ultimate Duets Collection
"It's Only Love"	2008	Tina Turner	Tina!
"Heaven"	2009	Jason Aldean	CMT Crossroads
"Summer of '69"	2009	Jason Aldean	CMT Crossroads
"Johnny Cash"	2009	Jason Aldean	CMT Crossroads
"She's Country"	2009	Jason Aldean	CMT Crossroads
"Back to You"	2009	Jason Aldean	CMT Crossroads
"Hicktown"	2009	Jason Aldean	CMT Crossroads
"Run to You"	2009	Jason Aldean	CMT Crossroads
"Hold On"	2009	Michael Bublé	Crazy Love
"Bang the Drum"	2010	Nelly Furtado	Sounds of Vancouver 2010: Opening Ceremony
"After All"	2013	Michael Bublé	To Be Loved
"Feels like Home"	2015	Diana Krall	Wallflower
"Hey Elvis"	2016	Billy Ray Cyrus	Thin Line
"Christmas"	2019	Robbie Williams	The Christmas Present
"When You're Gone"	2020	Helene Fischer	Die Helene Fischer Show – Meine schönsten Momente (Vol. 1)

== Songwriting credits ==
List of songs written or co-written for other artists, showing year released and album name
Title	Year	Artist	Album
"You Walked Away Again"	1979	Prism	Armageddon
"Take It or Leave It"	1979	Prism	Armageddon
"Jealousy"	1979	Prism	Armageddon
"Cover Girl"	1979	Prism	Armageddon
"I'm Ready"	1979	Ian Lloyd	Goose Bumps
"Wastin' Time"	1979	Bachman–Turner Overdrive	Rock n' Roll Nights
"Cover Girl"	1980	Prism	All the Best From Prism
"Straight from the Heart"	1980	Ian Lloyd	Third Wave Civilization
"Lonely Nights"	1980	Ian Lloyd	Third Wave Civilization
"Try to See It My Way"	1981	Tim Bogert	Progressions
"Remember"	1981	Bob Welch	Bob Welch
"Don't Let Him Know"	1981	Prism	Small Change
"Stay"	1981	Prism	Small Change
"Never Get to Heaven"	1981	Lisa Dal Bello	Drastic Measures
"You Could Be Good for Me"	1981	Lisa Dal Bello	Drastic Measures
"She Wants to Know"	1981	Lisa Dal Bello	Drastic Measures
"Jump"	1981	Loverboy	Get Lucky
"Straight from the Heart"	1981	Jon English	In Roads
"Rock and Roll Hell"	1982	Kiss	Creatures of the Night
"War Machine"	1982	Kiss	Creatures of the Night
"Down on Your Knees"	1982	Kiss	Killers
"Tonight"	1982	Randy Meisner	Randy Meisner
"Hiding from Love"	1982	Rosetta Stone	Hiding from Love EP
"Remember"	1982	Rosetta Stone	Hiding from Love EP
"Hiding from Love"	1982	Jane Scali	Having A Good Time
"Win Some, Lose Some"	1982	Scandal	Scandal
"Hiding from Love"	1982	Lisa Hartman Black	Letterock
"Lonely Nights"	1983	Uriah Heep	Head First
"Let Him Know"	1983	Tim Bogert	Master's Brew
"Straight from the Heart"	1983	Bonnie Tyler	Faster Than the Speed of Night
"Hiding from Love"	1983	Nantucket	No Direction Home
"No Way to Treat a Lady"	1983	Lisa Bade	Suspicion
"Edge of a Dream"	1984	Joe Cocker	Teachers
"Teacher, Teacher"	1984	38 Special	Teachers
"(Where Do You) Draw the Line"	1984	Ted Nugent	Penetrator
"Where Did the Time Go"	1984	Fast Forward	Living in Fiction
"Play to Win"	1984	Fast Forward	Living in Fiction
"Tonight"	1984	Fast Forward	Living in Fiction
"Draw the Line"	1984	Fast Forward	Living in Fiction
"Boys Nite Out"	1984	Krokus	The Blitz
"Can't Wait All Night"	1984	Juice Newton	Can't Wait All Night
"Dangerous"	1985	Loverboy	Lovin' Every Minute of It
"It Wan't Be You"	1985	Payolas	Here's the World for Ya
"Tears Are Not Enough"	1985	Northern Lights	We Are the World
"Let Me Down Easy"	1985	Roger Daltrey	Under a Raging Moon
"Rebel"	1985	Roger Daltrey	Under a Raging Moon
"Open Soul Surgery"	1986	April Wine	Walking Through Fire
"It Should Have Been Me"	1986	Neil Diamond	Headed for the Future
"Back Where You Started"	1986	Tina Turner	Break Every Rule
"No Way to Treat a Lady"	1986	Bonnie Raitt	Nine Lives
"No Way to Treat a Lady"	1986	Bonnie Tyler	Secret Dreams and Forbidden Fire
"Another Heartache"	1986	Rod Stewart	Every Beat of My Heart
"Back to Paradise"	1987	38 Special	Flashback: The Best of 38 Special
"It Should Have Been Me"	1987	Carly Simon	Coming Around Again
"Hometown Hero"	1987	Loverboy	Wildside
"No Way to Treat a Lady"	1987	Cameron Dye	Scenes from the Goldmine
"No Way to Treat a Lady"	1988	Elisabeth Andreassen	Alskar, Alskar Ej
"Can't Wait All Night"	1988	Elkie Brooks	Bookbinder's Kid
"Good to Be Back"	1988	Prism	Over 60 Minutes With... Prism
"Don't Let Him Know"	1988	Prism	Over 60 Minutes With... Prism
"Cover Girl"	1988	Prism	Over 60 Minutes With... Prism
"You Walked Away Again"	1988	Prism	Over 60 Minutes With... Prism
"Drive All Night"	1989	Dion DiMucci	Yo Frankie
"When the Night Comes"	1989	Joe Cocker	One Night of Sin
"Straight from the Heart"	1989	Bonnie Tyler & Meat Loaf	Heaven & Hell
"Draw the Line"	1989	Paul Dean	Hard Core
"The Best Was Yet to Come"	1990	Laura Branigan	Laura Branigan
"Feels Like Forever"	1991	Joe Cocker	Night Calls
"Nature of the Beast"	1991	The Law	The Law
"The Kids Wanna Rock"	1991	Sodom	The Saw Is the Law
"Tout pour te déplaire"	1991	Johnny Hallyday	Ça ne change pas un homme
"Run to You"	1992	Rage	Saviour
"(Everything I Do) I Do It for You"	1992	Manic Street Preachers	Suicide Is Painless
"(Everything I Do) I Do It for You"	1992	The Fatima Mansions	NME tribute album
"Why Must We Wait Until Tonight"	1993	Tina Turner	What's Love Got to Do with It
"Way of the World"	1993	Prism	Jericho
"Run to You"	1993	Lou Barlow	Most of the Worst and Some of the Best of Sentridoh
"Rough Town"	1994	Johnny Hallyday	Rough Town
"Rock Steady"	1995	Bonnie Raitt	Road Tested
"Prove It"	1995	Stevie Vann	Stevie Vann
"What Would It Take"	1996	Anne Murray	Anne Murray
"You Walked In"	1997	Lonestar	Crazy Nights
"Let's Talk About Love"	1997	Celine Dion	Let's Talk About Love
"Glitter"	1997	Mötley Crüe	Generation Swine
"Another Year Has Gone By"	1998	Celine Dion	These Are Special Times
"Follow Me"	1999	Melanie C	Northern Star
"(Everything I Do) I Do It for You"	1999	Brandy Norwood	Never Say Never
"Hey Elvis"	2000	Billy Ray Cyrus	Southern Rain
"The Way You Make Me Feel"	2000	Ronan Keating	Ronan
"Heaven"	2001	DJ Sammy	Heaven
"Run to You"	2003	Novaspace	Cubes
"Heaven" (Unplugged)	2003	Do	DO
"Drive"	2004	Shannon Noll	That's What I'm Talking About
"Run to You"	2004	Nil	The Covering Inferno
"The Right Place"	2006	Taylor Hicks	Taylor Hicks
"Never Gonna Break My Faith"	2006	Aretha Franklin feat. Blige and BCH	Bobby
"Follow Me"	2006	Do	Follow Me
"When You're Gone"	2006	Melanie C	Live Hits
"Heaven"	2007	Paul Anka	Classic Songs, My Way
"Run to You"	2007	Jørn Lande	Unlocking the Past
"All for Love"	2007	E.M.D.	A State of Mind
"Bang the Drum"	2010	Bryan Adams & Nelly Furtado	Sounds of Vancouver 2010: Opening Ceremony
"Heaven"	2010	Brandi Carlile	XOBC
"Don't Ya Say It"	2010	Aurea	Aurea
"Heaven"	2011	Twiggy	Romantically Yours
"Run"	2012	Flo Rida	Wild Ones
"When You're Gone"	2012	Melanie C	The Sea – Live
"After All"	2013	Michael Bublé	To Be Loved
"When You Love Someone"	2013	Kenny Rogers	You Can't Make Old Friends
"Candy, Candy"	2014	Lea Michele	Legends of Oz: Dorothy's Return
"Work with Me"	2014	Lea Michele	Legends of Oz: Dorothy's Return
"One Day"	2014	Lea Michele	Legends of Oz: Dorothy's Return
"Hey Elvis"	2016	Billy Ray Cyrus feat. Adams and Hughes	Thin Line
"Run to You"	2016	Sonata Arctica	The Ninth Hour
"Heaven"	2017	Shane Filan	Love Always
"Heaven"	2017	Exit Eden	Rhapsodies in Black
"Heaven"	2018	Chad Darou	Raising the Bar
"Welcome to Hollywood"	2018	Original Broadway Cast	Pretty Woman: The Musical
"Anywhere But Here"	2018	Original Broadway Cast	Pretty Woman: The Musical
"Something About Her (Preamble)"	2018	Original Broadway Cast	Pretty Woman: The Musical
"Something About Her"	2018	Original Broadway Cast	Pretty Woman: The Musical
"Luckiest Girl in the World"	2018	Original Broadway Cast	Pretty Woman: The Musical
"Rodeo Drive"	2018	Original Broadway Cast	Pretty Woman: The Musical
"Anywhere But Here (Reprise)"	2018	Original Broadway Cast	Pretty Woman: The Musical
"On a Night Like Tonight"	2018	Original Broadway Cast	Pretty Woman: The Musical
"Don't Forget to Dance"	2018	Original Broadway Cast	Pretty Woman: The Musical
"Freedom"	2018	Original Broadway Cast	Pretty Woman: The Musical
"You're Beautiful"	2018	Original Broadway Cast	Pretty Woman: The Musical
"Welcome to Our World (More Champagne)"	2018	Original Broadway Cast	Pretty Woman: The Musical
"This Is My Life"	2018	Original Broadway Cast	Pretty Woman: The Musical
"Never Give Up on a Dream"	2018	Original Broadway Cast	Pretty Woman: The Musical
"You and I"	2018	Original Broadway Cast	Pretty Woman: The Musical
"I Can't Go Back"	2018	Original Broadway Cast	Pretty Woman: The Musical
"Freedom (Reprise)"	2018	Original Broadway Cast	Pretty Woman: The Musical
"Long Way Home"	2018	Original Broadway Cast	Pretty Woman: The Musical
"Together Forever"	2018	Original Broadway Cast	Pretty Woman: The Musical
"You and I (Edit)"	2018	Original Broadway Cast	Pretty Woman: The Musical
"Lonely Nights"	2019	Jørn Lande	Heavy Rock Radio II: Executing the Classics
"Never Gonna Break My Faith"	2020	Aretha Franklin (unreleased solo version)	Non-album single
"Christmas Time"	2021	Rob Thomas	Something About Christmas Time
"Heaven"	2021	Jason Aldean	Macon, Georgia
"The Thing That Wrecks You"	2023	Tenille Townes	Non-album singles
"Summer of '69"	2023	Buckcherry	Vol. 10

== See also ==
- Bryan Adams videography
- List of diamond-certified albums in Canada
