= Pretty Woman (musical) =

Musical production

- Broadway Playbill
- Music: Bryan Adams; Jim Vallance
- Lyrics: Bryan Adams; Jim Vallance
- Book: Garry Marshall; J. F. Lawton
- Basis: Pretty Woman by J. F. Lawton
- Premiere: March 13, 2018: Oriental Theatre, Chicago
- Productions: 2018 Chicago; 2018 Broadway; 2020 West End; 2021 North American tour 2023 North American tour 2023 UK tour

Pretty Woman is a musical with music and lyrics by Bryan Adams and Jim Vallance, and a book by Garry Marshall and J. F. Lawton. The musical is based on the 1990 film of the same name written by Lawton and directed by Marshall. It centers on the relationship that develops between Vivian Ward, a free-spirited Hollywood prostitute, and Edward Lewis, a wealthy businessman who hires her for a week to be his escort for several business and social functions.

The original production of Pretty Woman premiered at the Oriental Theatre, Chicago in March 2018, with direction and choreography by Jerry Mitchell, and starring Samantha Barks and Steve Kazee, as Vivian and Edward. It made its Broadway debut at the David T. Nederlander Theatre on August 16, 2018, and closed one year later on August 18, 2019.

== Background ==
The musical is based on the 1990 film Pretty Woman. The film was produced on a budget of just $14 million, earning over $463 million in global box office receipts. Written by J. F. Lawton, and directed by Garry Marshall, the musical centers around Vivian Ward, a free spirited Hollywood prostitute who lives with her sarcastic wisecracking Greek American best friend and roommate Kit De Luca. Kit taught Vivian the prostitute trade. Vivian is hired by Edward Lewis, a handsome wealthy businessman, to be his escort for several business and social functions, and their developing relationship over the course of her week-long stay with him.

In March 2014, it was announced that a musical adaptation of the film was being developed for the stage, with original screenwriter Lawton and director Marshall attached to write the book. The following year Marshall revealed that rights had been secured. Although Marshall died in July 2016, producer Paula Wagner said that work on the musical would continue. In September 2017, it was announced that the show would receive its world premiere at the Oriental Theatre, Chicago, before an expected Broadway transfer in fall 2018.

In an interview, director Jerry Mitchell said that the score "will have the feel of late '80s-early '90s rock: That’s one of the great things about Bryan Adams—it's where he lives. So you’ve got the rock and roll stuff, the up-tempos." Roy Orbison's "Oh, Pretty Woman" was originally excluded from the musical. On June 19, 2019, the show included "Oh, Pretty Woman" during the curtain call.

== Productions ==
=== Chicago and Broadway ===
Pretty Woman made its world premiere at the Oriental Theatre in Chicago, Illinois on March 13, 2018, for a limited five week run until April 15. Following its initial run it transferred to Broadway at the Nederlander Theatre beginning previews on July 20, 2018 before the official opening on August 16, 2018. Cast for the Chicago and Broadway productions featured Samantha Barks, in her Broadway debut as Vivian Ward, Steve Kazee and Andy Karl as Edward Lewis, Orfeh as Kit De Luca, Jason Danieley as Philip Stuckey, Eric Anderson as Mr. Thompson, and Kingsley Leggs and Ezra Knight as James Morse. Kazee left the show after the Chicago engagement due to "family reasons" and was replaced by Andy Karl.

During previews on August 2, 2018, a performance was dedicated to Garry Marshall (who died in 2016) and was attended by Marshall's family and Julia Roberts, who played Vivian in the original film. A seat in the Nederlander Theatre was also dedicated in his honor. The musical broke the Nederlander Theatre box office record for an eight-performance week before its official opening August 16 with a gross of $1,142,989 (83.72% percent of its potential). On July 9, 2019, Wesley Orbison and Alex Orbison joined the cast on stage to perform "Oh, Pretty Woman" to celebrate the 55th anniversary of the song's release and to pay tribute to their late father Roy Orbison. The production closed on August 18, 2019, after 27 previews and 420 regular performances.

The production was directed and choreographed by Jerry Mitchell, with set design by David Rockwell, costume design by Gregg Barnes, lighting design by Kenneth Posner and Philip S. Rosenberg and sound design by John Shivers. The Broadway cast recording for the musical was made available from Atlantic Records digitally on September 21, 2018. Physical CDs of the cast album went on sale October 26, 2018.

=== Hamburg ===
On December 13, 2018, it was announced that the musical would begin performances at Stage Theater an der Elbe, Hamburg, Germany on September 23, with an official opening night of September 29, 2019.

=== North American tour ===
A North American tour was planned to begin in October 2020 at the Providence Performing Arts Center in Providence, Rhode Island, but it did not open due to the COVID-19 pandemic. The tour finally kicked off on October 9, 2021, at the Providence Performing Arts Center and closed on May 7, 2023, at the SAFE Credit Union Performing Arts Center in Sacramento, California.

=== West End ===
Pretty Woman began previews at the Piccadilly Theatre in the West End on February 13, 2020, before the official opening on March 2, 2020. Casting included Aimie Atkinson as Vivian Ward, Danny Mac as Edward Lewis, Rachael Wooding as Kit De Luca, Bob Harms as Happy Man/Mr Thompson, Neil McDermott as Philip Stuckey and Mark Holden as James Morse. The show closed on March 16, 2020, due to the COVID-19 pandemic and reopened with the same principal cast on July 8, 2021, at the Savoy Theatre. Courtney Bowman joined the cast as Kit De Luca on November 15, 2022. Oliver Tompsett took over as Edward Lewis on April 4, 2023. The production closed on June 18, 2023.

=== Cracow ===
A Polish-language production opened on February 14, 2021, at Teatr Variété in Cracow, directed by Wojciech Kościelniak, starring Adrianna Dorociak and Maria Tyszkiewicz as Vivian Ward and Rafał Drozd and Marek Nędza as Edward Lewis.

=== Milan ===
In April 2021 Stage Entertainment Italy announced the first Italian version of the show, which opened on 28 September 2021 at the Teatro Nazionale in Milan.

=== Spain (2022–2024) ===
A Spanish-language production officially opened on 27 September 2022 at the Teatre Apolo in Barcelona, starring Cristina Llorente as Vivian Ward and Roger Berruezo as Edward Lewis. On 4 October 2023 the production was transferred to the Teatro Gran Vía in Madrid.

=== North American non-Equity tour (2023–2025) ===
A non-Equity tour kicked off on 2 October 2023 at the Stanley Theatre in Utica, New York, starring Ellie Baker as Vivian Ward and Chase Wolfe as Edward Lewis, and closed on 11 May 2025 at the Chrysler Hall in Norfolk, Virginia.

=== UK and Ireland tour (2023–present) ===
A UK and Ireland tour opened on 17 October 2023 at The Alexandra in Birmingham and ended on 28 September 2024 at the Lyceum Theatre in Sheffield. Cast included Amber Davies as Vivian, Oliver Savile as Edward, Ore Oduba as Happy Man / Mr Thompson and Natalie Paris as Kit De Luca.

=== Brazil ===
A Brazilian version premiered at September 2023 in one of the biggest theaters in the country, Teatro Santander in São Paulo. The cast included the Jarbas Homem de Mello as Edward Lewis and Thais Piza as Vivian Ward.

=== Netherlands (2023–2024) ===
A Dutch version of the musical premiered on 8 October 2023 at the Beatrix Theater in Utrecht, with Shanna Slaap as Vivian Ward and Jan Kooijman as Edward Lewis. The show got a Diamond award for 175.000 tickets sold, and will end on the 26th of May.

=== Zurich (2025) ===
FBM Entertainment launched the show in Switzerland for the first time. It was performed at the Theater 11 Zürich from April 4 to May 4, 2025.

== Musical numbers ==
The musical numbers from the original Broadway production are as follows:

Act I

- "Welcome to Hollywood" – Happy Man, Kit and Company
- "Anywhere But Here" – Vivian
- "Something About Her (Preamble)" – Edward
- "Welcome to Hollywood (Reprise)" – Happy Man
- "Something About Her" – Edward
- "I Could Get Used to This" – Vivian
- "Luckiest Girl in the World" – Vivian, Kit and Giulio
- "Rodeo Drive" – Kit and Company
- "Anywhere But Here" (Reprise) – Vivian
- "On a Night like Tonight" – Mr. Thompson and Company
- "Don't Forget to Dance" – Happy Man, Scarlett and Company
- "Freedom" – Edward
- "You're Beautiful" – Edward, Vivian and Company

Act II

- "Welcome to Our World (More Champagne)" – Stuckey, Kit and Company
- "This Is My Life" – Vivian
- "Never Give Up on a Dream" – Happy Man, Kit and Company
- "You and I" – Edward, Alfredo, Violetta and Company
- "I Can't Go Back" – Vivian
- "Freedom" (Reprise) – Edward
- "Long Way Home" – Vivian and Edward
- "Together Forever" – Edward, Vivian, Happy Man, Kit and Company
- "Finale/Oh, Pretty Woman", Kit, Edward, Vivian, Happy Man, and Company

A number of songs Adams and Vallance wrote for the musical ended up not being used in the show itself. However, several of them were included in subsequent Bryan Adams albums: "Please Stay" was recorded for the 2018 compilation album Ultimate, "I Could Get Used to This" can be found on the 2019 album Shine a Light, and "I've Been Looking for You" was included in the 2022 album So Happy It Hurts. Adams also re-recorded all the songs that did make it into the show for the album Pretty Woman – The Musical, released March 2022.

Bryan Adams expressed some frustration about the songwriting process for the musical in the Dutch newspaper Metro. "Writing that musical was a masterclass in songwriting, it was also a masterclass in not losing your mind, as there was so much re-writing and rejection during the process of the production. But that doesn’t mean that the rejected songs haven’t found a home. I love I've Been Looking for You, Please Stay, and I Could Get Used to This, and of course it’s too bad they aren’t in the musical, but that’s the way the Broadway ball bounces."

== Cast and characters ==
Character	Chicago	Broadway	West End	North American tour	North American tour	UK tour	Australia
Character	2018		2020	2021	2023	2023	2025
Vivian Ward	Samantha Barks	Samantha Barks	Aimie Atkinson	Olivia Valli	Ellie Baker	Amber Davies	Samantha Jade
Edward Lewis	Steve Kazee	Andy Karl	Danny Mac	Adam Pascal	Chase Wolfe	Oliver Savile	Ben Hall
Kit De Luca	Orfeh	Orfeh	Rachael Wooding	Jessica Crouch	Rae Davenport	Natalie Paris	Michelle Brasier
Happy Man / Mr. Thompson	Eric Anderson	Eric Anderson	Bob Harms	Kyle Taylor Parker	Adam Du Plessis	Ore Oduba	Tim Omaji
Philip Stuckey	Jason Danieley	Jason Danieley	Neil McDermott	Matthew Stocke	Liam Searcy	Ben Darcy	Douglas Hansell
James Morse	Kingsley Leggs	Ezra Knight	Mark Holden	—N/a	—N/a	—N/a	
Giulio	Tommy Bracco	Tommy Bracco	Alex Charles	Matthew Vincent Taylor	Joshua Kring	Noah Harrison	Jordan Tomljenovic
David Morse	Robby Clater	Robby Clater	Antony Hewitt	Alex Gibbs	Kerry D'Jovanni	Chomba Taulo	Jordan Angelides

=== Notable cast replacements ===
==== Broadway (2018–2019) ====
- Edward Lewis: Adam Pascal, Brennin Hunt

==== West End (2020–2023) ====
- Edward Lewis: Oliver Tompsett
- Kit De Luca: Courtney Bowman

== Critical reception ==
Pretty Woman was generally poorly received by critics, with the show's writing being a frequent focus of criticism. Critics found that the gender dynamics of the movie's plot had aged poorly and that the musical had failed to bring the story up to date for 2018. In his review for The New York Times, Ben Brantley criticized the verbatim reuse of dialog from the movie, writing that the show's creators had "hewed suffocatingly close to the film’s story, gags and dialogue." Critics from The Guardian and Variety took issue with the show's glossiness and what they perceived as an attempt to make a "G-rated family show" from the source material.

The score by Bryan Adams and Jim Vallance was generally described as "pleasant" but "bland". Critics generally approved of the show's performers, particularly stars Andy Karl and Samantha Barks, but found they were unable to rise above the show's material. In a review for Vulture, Sara Holdren expressed sympathy for the show's performers, writing that they were "hooked up like defibrillators to a body that, no matter how much energy they pump into it, can’t be revived".

== Awards and nominations ==
=== Broadway production ===
Year	Award	Category	Nominee	Result
2019	Broadway.com Audience Awards	Favorite Leading Actor in a Musical	Andy Karl	Won
2019	Broadway.com Audience Awards	Favorite Featured Actress in a Musical	Orfeh	Won
2019	Broadway.com Audience Awards	Favorite Diva Performance	Orfeh	Won
2019	Broadway.com Audience Awards	Favorite Onstage Pair	Samantha Barks and Andy Karl	Nominated
2019	Broadway.com Audience Awards	Favorite Breakthrough Performance (Female)	Samantha Barks	Nominated
