= Please Stay =

Please Stay may refer to:

- "Please Stay" (Burt Bacharach song), first recorded by The Drifters, 1961; covered by many
- "Please Stay" (Kylie Minogue song), 2000
- "Please Stay", a song by Bryan Adams from Ultimate
- "Please Stay (Once You Go Away)" or "Please Don't Stay (Once You Go Away)", a song by Marvin Gaye from Let's Get It On
