= Pretty Woman – The Musical =

Studio album by Bryan Adams
- Released: 4 March 2022
- Genre: Rock
- Producer: Bryan Adams

Bryan Adams chronology
Shine a Light (2019)	Pretty Woman – The Musical (2022)	So Happy It Hurts (2022)

Pretty Woman – The Musical is an album by Canadian singer-songwriter Bryan Adams. The album features re-recorded songs Adams and Jim Vallance wrote for the musical of the same name. A cast album was released in 2018, but Adams decided to record the songs himself as well.

== Background ==
The songs from this album were originally written for the musical adaptation of the 1990 film Pretty Woman. In an interview, director Jerry Mitchell said that the score "will have the feel of late '80s-early '90s rock: That's one of the great things about Bryan Adams—it's where he lives. So you've got the rock and roll stuff, the up-tempos."

A number of songs Adams and Vallance wrote for the musical ended up not being used in the show itself. However, several of them were included in subsequent Bryan Adams albums: "Please Stay" was recorded for the 2018 compilation album Ultimate, "I Could Get Used to This" can be found on the 2019 album Shine a Light, and "I've Been Looking for You" was released on the 2022 album So Happy It Hurts.

Bryan Adams explained the songwriting process for the musical in the Dutch newspaper Metro. "Writing that musical was a masterclass in songwriting, it was also a masterclass in not losing your mind, as there was so much re-writing and rejection during the process of the production. But that doesn't mean that the rejected songs haven't found a home. I love 'I've Been Looking for You', 'Please Stay', and 'I Could Get Used to This', and of course it's too bad they aren't in the musical, but that's the way the Broadway ball bounces."

== Release and promotion ==
It was at first a digital download studio release, released online on 4 March 2022. It was released a week prior to the album So Happy It Hurts. At first, Pretty Woman – The Musical was the only Bryan Adams album not be released physically. It was only released on YouTube, Spotify, and several other streaming services in March 2022. Finally, it was physically released via BMG on May 12, 2023.

== Track listing ==
All tracks written by Bryan Adams and Jim Vallance and produced by Adams.

Pretty Woman track listing
No.	Title	Length
1.	"Welcome to Hollywood"
2.	"Anywhere but Here"
3.	"Something About Her"
4.	"Luckiest Girl in the World"
5.	"Rodeo Drive"
6.	"On a Night Like Tonight"
7.	"Don't Forget to Dance"
8.	"Freedom"
9.	"You're Beautiful"
10.	"This Is Your Life"
11.	"Never Give Up on a Dream"
12.	"You and I"
13.	"I Could Get Used to This"
14.	"You Can't Go Back"
15.	"Long Way Home"
16.	"Together Forever"

== Personnel ==
=== Musicians ===
All vocals and instruments performed by Bryan Adams, except:

- Jim Vallance – Wurlitzer electric piano (1, 16), percussion (15), percussion programming (1, 11), chorus arpeggios (12), piano (3, 11, 15), synth bass (11), keyboards (5, 10, 15)
- David Foster – synth strings (6)
- Ramon Stagnaro – Spanish guitar (6)
- Keith Scott – guitar (7)

=== Production ===
- Produced by Bryan Adams
- Recorded and mixed by Hayden Watson
- Recorded at The Warehouse Studio (Vancouver, Canada).
- Mastered by Bob Ludwig at Gateway Mastering (Portland, Maine, US).
- Cover photography by Bryan Adams
