= I Thought I'd Seen Everything =

- Single cover

Single by Bryan Adams

from the album 11
- Released: January 28, 2008
- Recorded: 2007
- Genre: Rock
- Length: 5.07 (Album Version); 3:58 (UK radio edit)
- Label: Polydor
- Songwriters: Bryan Adams; Robert John "Mutt" Lange; Eliot Kennedy

Bryan Adams singles chronology
"When You're Gone" (2006)	"I Thought I'd Seen Everything" (2008)	"Tonight We Have the Stars" (2008)

"I Thought I'd Seen Everything" is a rock song written by Bryan Adams, Eliot Kennedy and Robert John "Mutt" Lange for Adams 10 solo album 11 (2008). The song's musical-style and production were heavily inspired by rock and pop music from the 1980s, and its lyrics chronicle a relationship. The song was released as a download only single in the UK on 17 March 2008.

The song made its North American premiere in February 2008.

== Recording and production ==
In 1991 Robert Lange co-wrote a song with the same title for his ex-wife Stevie Vann; however according to Adams website, the title and writer are only similarities that exist between the two songs, and that this song is an entirely new composition. Adams did also work with Stevie Vann in the past.

== Chart performance ==
Although "I Thought I'd Seen Everything" was officially released to US radio on March 1, 2008, it proved somewhat popular on Adult Contemporary radio where it peaked at the top thirty and peaked at 20. In Canada "I Thought I'd Seen Everything" was officially released to radio in March, 2008. The song reached the top fifty on the Canadian Hot 100 chart where it peaked at the top 50 on 47.

The song was released in Australia, Europe and New Zealand on March 1, 2008. "I Thought I'd Seen Everything" peaked at the top 200 at 146. "I Thought I'd Seen Everything" continued the trend of lower-charting singles which was started by Adams Room Service single Flying. "I Thought I'd Seen Everything" peaked in the top 40 in Hungary and Austria, and the top 50 in Switzerland and Germany.

== Music video ==
Adams in the music video

The music video for "I Thought I'd Seen Everything" was directed by Andrew MacNaughtan and Bryan Adams. The video features Adams and his band performing the song live in a studio, similar to the style of "Please Forgive Me", released in 1993. In an interview with Dominick A. Miserandino from The Celebrity Cafe Adams talked about how if felt to direct the music video:

It's a lot more work. But a lot of people can see me for what I am - what's real - rather than something that's an imaginary, trumped up idea of what the song should be. I mean, if I were to work with a director I'd want to work with someone that's incredibly visual. There's no point in doing anything that doesn't represent you. Right now I'm in that mode. I just want to be real, 100 percent. I don't want to candy coat it whatsoever. Here I am. Take me for what I am. Right now I'm on a tour in America just doing the whole thing by myself on an acoustic guitar.

== Track listing ==
The two B-sides on the CD single are not available on all versions of the album, 11.

=== CD ===
No.	Title	Writer(s)	Length
1.	"I Thought I'd Seen Everything"	Adams, Robert Lange	5:07
2.	"Miss America"	Adams, Kennedy	3:57
3.	"Way of the World"	Adams, Vallance, Peters	3:18

=== UK digital download ===
No.	Title	Writer(s)	Length
1.	"I Thought I'd Seen Everything (radio edit)"	Adams, Lange	3:57

== Personnel ==
- Bryan Adams – vocals, acoustic guitar, bass, production
- Colin Cripps – electric slide guitar
- Keith Scott – electric guitar
- Gary Breit – piano, Hammond organ
- Pat Steward – drums

== Release history ==
Region	Date
United Kingdom	January 28, 2008
World	March 1, 2008

== Charts ==
Chart (2008)	Peak position
Austria (Ö3 Austria Top 40)	41
Belgium (Ultratip Bubbling Under Flanders)	10
Belgium (Ultratip Bubbling Under Wallonia)	24
Canadian Hot 100	47
Czech Republic (Rádio – Top 100)	64
Germany (GfK)	55
Hungarian Singles Chart	30
Switzerland (Schweizer Hitparade)	52
US Adult Contemporary (Billboard)	21

Year-end chart performance
Chart (2008)	Position
Canada AC (Billboard)	9
