= Oliver Savile =

British actor

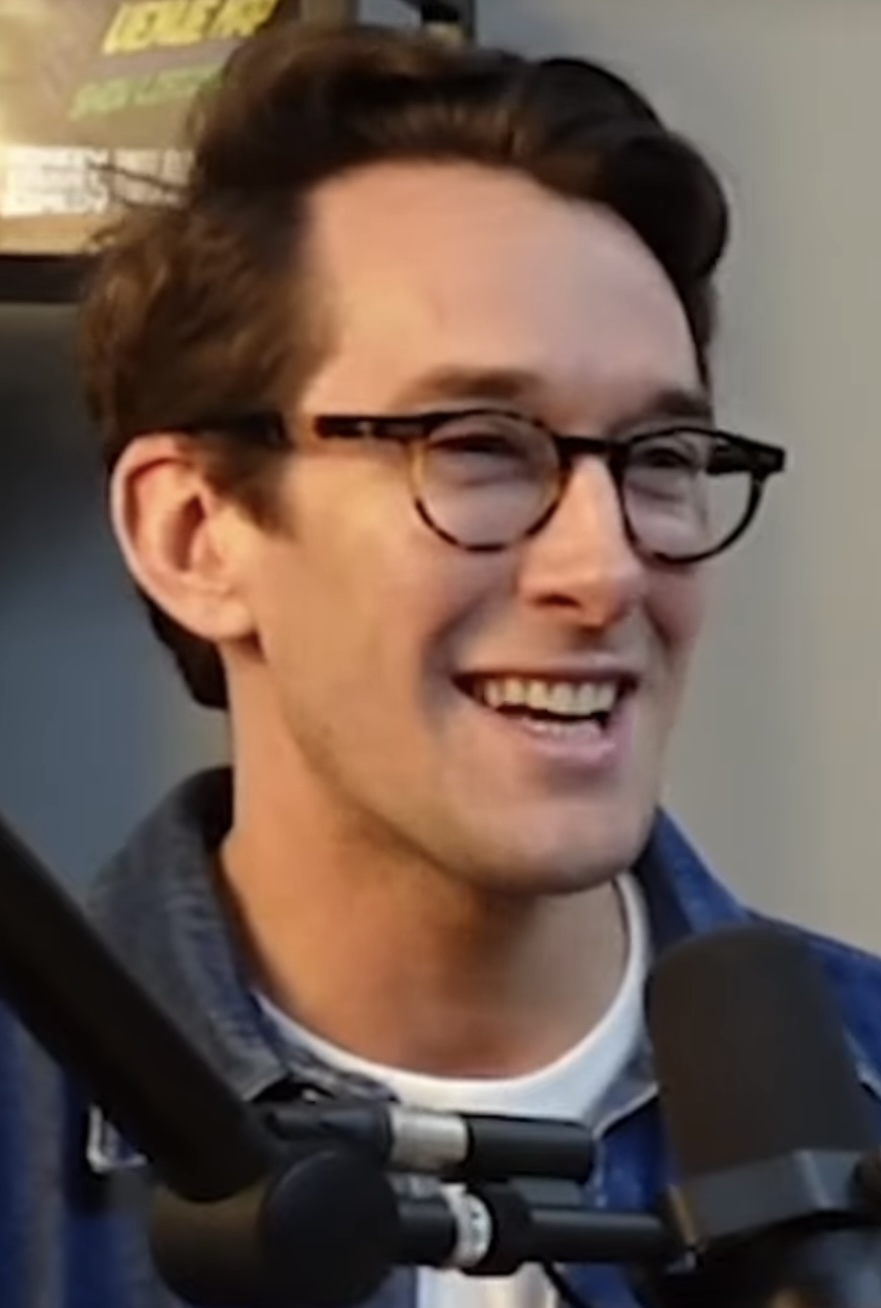
- Savile in 2024
- Born: 8 July 1989 (age 37); Buxton, England
- Occupation: Actor
- Known for: Musical theatre
- Notable work: Wicked, Les Misérables, The Phantom of the Opera

Oliver Savile (born 8 July 1989) is an English actor. He is best known for his musical theatre work. In the West End, he has performed leading roles in shows such as Wicked, Les Misérables, The Phantom of the Opera, Annie Get Your Gun and Pretty Woman, in addition to UK and international tours and other productions.

In addition to his stage work, Savile has appeared in television and films, including as Luca in the television series Ted Lasso and Mike in the film Tomorrow Morning.

== Early life and education ==
Savile was born on 8 July 1989 in Buxton, Derbyshire. His father was a salesman, and his mother was employed in the IT sector. He developed an interest in acting after attending with his father a performance of Blood Brothers at Buxton Opera House, which led him to join a local drama group.

Savile has struggled with severe dyslexia. After taking a BTEC course in Musical Theatre in 2007, he attended the Mountview Academy of Theatre Arts, where he pursued a degree in musical theatre, although his initial intention had been to study drama.

== Career ==
Before completing his training in 2010, he was cast as of one of the brothers in Joseph and the Amazing Technicolor Dreamcoat He next appeared at the Theatre Royal in Wakefield in Sleeping Beauty. In 2011, he joined the international tour of Mamma Mia! as a member of the ensemble and understudied the role of Sky. In 2012, he appeared as William/Peter Tork in the musical Monkee Business, based on The Monkees.

His the same year, He made his West End debut, when he played Enjolras in Les Misérables at the Queen's Theatre, once falling into the orchestra pit but landing on its safety net. In 2013, Savile played Rum Tum Tugger in Cats, and the following year in The Phantom of The Opera, he was a member of the ensemble and understudy for the role of Raoul, later taking over the role in a principal capacity.

He then played Fiyero in Wicked at the Apollo Victoria Theatre during the musical's 10th anniversary. In 2018, he portrayed Sir Hugo in Knights of the Rose and was Robert in Company in 2018. In the following year, he appeared as Whizzer in Falsettos at The Other Palace and was Gideon in Sting's musical The Last Ship. for its U.S. tour, which was later interrupted due to the COVID-19 pandemic

During the COVID-19 pandemic, with theatrical productions suspended and without an acting contract, Savile trained as a certified arborist and worked providing garden maintenance services. In 2021, he made a television appearance as Luca in the series Ted Lasso. In 2022, he played Frank-N-Furter in the European tour of The Rocky Horror Show. In the United Kingdom later that year he played the Prince in a one-off concert of Emojiland. In 2023, he was Frank in Annie Get Your Gun at the London Palladium, and later that year toured the United Kingdom as Edward Lewis in Pretty Woman. The next year he reprised the role of Frank-N-Furter for a second Swiss-Austrian-German tour that continued into 2025.

In September 2025 it was announced that Savile will play Cinderella's Prince/Wolf in the London revival of Into the Woods at the Bridge Theatre. Savile joined Katie Brayben, playing the Baker's Wife, Kate Fleetwood as the Witch and Bella Brown as Rapunzel. In March 2026, he was nominated for the Olivier Award for Best Actor in a Supporting Role in a Musical.

In June 2026, he was cast as Javert for the West End production of Les Misérables.

== Personal life ==
Savile was in a relationship with fellow performer Melissa James, whom he met while working on Cats. He later dated actress Sydnie Hocknell, with whom he worked on Pretty Woman and The Rocky Horror Show. He is a motorcycle enthusiast.

== Stage credits ==
| Year | Title | Role | Location |
|---|---|---|---|
| 2010 | Sleeping Beauty | Prince | Theatre Royal, Wakefield |
| 2010 | Joseph and The Amazing Technicolor Dreamcoat | Brother/2nd Cover Joseph | UK Tour |
| 2011 | Mamma Mia! | Ensemble/1st Cover Sky | International Tour |
| 2012 | Monkee Business - The Musical | William/Peter Tork | UK Tour |
| 2012 | Les Misérables | Enjolras | Queen's Theatre |
| 2013 | Cats | Rum Tug Tugger | UK Tour |
| 2014-2015 | The Phantom of The Opera | Raoul | Her Majesty's Theatre |
| 2015-2017 | Wicked | Fiyero | Apollo Victoria Theatre |
| 2017 | I Wish My Life Were Like A Musical | Himself | Edinburgh Fringe Festival |
| 2018 | Knights of The Rose | Sir Hugo | Arts Theatre |
| 2018 | Company | Robert | Aberdeen Arts Centre |
| 2018 | Camelot | Sir Sagramore | London Palladium |
| 2019 | Falsettos | Whizzer | The Other Palace |
| 2019-2020 | The Last Ship | Gideon | UK, Canada, U.S. Tour |
| 2022 | The Rocky Horror Show | Frank-N-Furter | Germany, Austria, Switzerland Tour |
| 2022 | Emojiland | Prince | Garrick Theatre (concert) |
| 2023 | Annie Get Your Gun | Frank | London Palladium |
| 2023-2024 | Pretty Woman | Edward Lewis | UK, Ireland Tour |
| 2024-2025 | The Rocky Horror Show | Frank-N-Furter | Germany, Austria, Switzerland Tour |
| 2025-2026 | Into the Woods | Cinderella's Prince/Wolf | Bridge Theatre |
| 2026- | Les Misérables | Javert | Sondheim Theatre |

== Filmography ==
| Year | Title | Role |
|---|---|---|
| 2021 | Ted Lasso | Luca |
| 2022 | Tomorrow Morning Movie | Mike |
