= So Happy It Hurts =

2022 studio album by Bryan Adams

Studio album by Bryan Adams
- Released: 11 March 2022
- Genre: Rock
- Length: 39:10
- Label: BMG
- Producer: Bryan Adams

Bryan Adams chronology
Pretty Woman – The Musical (2022)	So Happy It Hurts (2022)	Classic (2022)

Singles from So Happy It Hurts
- 1. "So Happy It Hurts" Released: 11 October 2021; 2. "On the Road" Released: 29 November 2021; 3. "Kick Ass" Released: 9 December 2021; 4. "Never Gonna Rain" Released: 25 January 2022; 5. "Always Have, Always Will" Released: 11 March 2022

So Happy It Hurts is the fifteenth studio album by Canadian singer-songwriter Bryan Adams, released on 11 March 2022 through BMG.

== Background ==
The album is the singer's first to be released on the BMG Rights Management label after his previous album Shine a Light was released by Polydor Records and its parent label Universal Music Group. Adams confirmed that the album would be called So Happy It Hurts, describing the album as a "return to life" after the COVID-19 pandemic. Describing the album, he also said: "The pandemic and lockdown really brought home the truth that spontaneity can be taken away," he said in a press release. "Suddenly all touring stopped, no one could jump in the car and go. The title song 'So Happy It Hurts' is about freedom, autonomy, spontaneity and the thrill of the open road. The album of the same name touches on many of the ephemeral things in life that are really the secret to happiness and, most importantly, human connection."

Adams played the majority of the instruments while recording the album. He detailed the process in an interview with the Rock Cellar magazine: "The only thing that's different on this record compared to previous albums is I couldn't perform it with my band. I had to find another way. And so what I was doing was recording all the instruments myself, one by one, and trying to create the feeling of a band—and in the meantime, perhaps this is one of the reasons the record is quite joyous. I had such a good time doing it. It was really fun to try and live my lifelong dream of being a drummer and then structuring each piece of the record one-by-one until it sounded like a song or it sounded like an album."

Several of the songs pre-date the COVID-19 pandemic, Adams told Dutch newspaper Metro. He admitted the song "These Are the Moments That Make Up My Life" was originally intended for the 2008 film Marley & Me, starring Owen Wilson and Jennifer Aniston. "We never completed it in time. However, when putting ideas together for this album I found a rough demo I'd made of the song and so I went at it again. This could be my favorite song on the album compositionally, at least today it is."

The song "I've Been Looking for You" dates back to the writing sessions for Pretty Woman – The Musical, Adams explains: "Writing that musical was a masterclass in songwriting, it was also a masterclass in not losing your mind, as there was so much re-writing and rejection during the process of the production. But that doesn't mean that the rejected songs haven't found a home. I love 'I've Been Looking for You', 'Please Stay', and 'I Could Get Used to This', and of course it's too bad they aren't in the musical, but that's the way the Broadway ball bounces."

In the same interview Adams comments on reconnecting with songwriter and producer Robert John "Mutt" Lange: "We had been bouncing ideas back and forth for a couple of songs, just prior to my working on the record. It just happened naturally, so we kept writing songs. I liked a song he had started called 'Kick Ass' and so we worked that up. Then I asked him to help me with an idea I had called 'On the Road' and we got that done. It was just one song after the other, it was a bit of magic if I think about it." Their last collaboration was on the 2008 album 11.

== Release and promotion ==
=== Singles ===
"So Happy It Hurts" was released as the lead single on 11 October 2021, prior to the album's release. A music video was released along with the single, directed by Adams at The Warehouse Studio in Vancouver.

"On the Road" was released on 29 November 2021. The single was released at the same time as the presentation of the Pirelli Calendar 2022, conceived by Adams and is titled On the Road and portrays talents from the world of music that the artist has brought together on a journey across nationalities. A music video was released along with the single, directed by Adams.

"Kick Ass" was released on 9 December 2021, the song written by Adams and Robert Lange and features an introduction by John Cleese. The song premiered during 6 nights of concerts in mid-November 2021 at Encore Theater in Las Vegas. The video of the song was published on Adams' official YouTube channel.

"Never Gonna Rain" was released on 25 January 2022, is a melodic rock song. Adams said, "The ultimate optimist is someone who keeps on expecting the best, even in the face of the worst. Living in the moment, instead of in fear. Turning the negatives into positives. Taking the rain and turning it into a gift." A music video was released along with the single, directed by Adams and filmed at Wynn Las Vegas in November 2021.

"Always Have, Always Will" was released on 11 March 2022, the day the album came out. Adams described the meaning of the track on Twitter a few days later: "A declaration of devotion, pure and simple. It's for someone that has been with you and is still with you despite your ups and downs; someone that can see through your layers of complexity and sees you for you. Someone you appreciate, respect, and trust." A music video was released along with the single, directed by Adams and filmed at Wynn Las Vegas in November 2021.

=== Tour ===
Adams began touring in support of the album on January 29, 2022, in Gondomar, Portugal. The tour is currently set to conclude on May 22, 2024, in Belfast, Northern Ireland. Joan Jett was the opening act for the North American leg from June through August 2023. Dave Stewart is scheduled as the opening act for the second North American leg from January to March 2024.

== Critical reception ==
Professional ratings
Review scores
Source	Rating
Clash	7/10
Classic Rock	3.5/5 stars
Cryptic Rock	5/5 stars
Maximum Volume Music	8/10
Retropop Magazine	4/5 stars

So Happy It Hurts received critical acclaim. Cryptic Rock who awarded it 5/5, claiming it "is a must have for anyone who considers them a fan of Rock-n-Roll".

Emma Harrison of Clash stating that the album "is universally positive and is chock full of uplifting songs that will make even stern smiles smile."

Neil Jeffries of Louder wrote: "For four decades, Bryan Adams has been the master of boy-next-door, chorus-led radio-friendly rock. He has occasionally deviated from that path, but just when you think that might mean he's acting his age (now 62) he'll snap back into the groove—as he's done here."

Michael Gallucci of Ultimate Classic Rock wrote: "There are plenty of big guitar riffs and standard rock fare on So Happy It Hurts, which at times sounds like a throwback to Adams' '80s heyday, along with a few modern touches to place things in the 21st century. It's not an uneasy mix—Adams and co-producer Robert John "Mutt" Lange hone the dozen songs to their sharpest edges..."

Sam Richards of Riff magazine wrote: "Listen to the catchy title song of Bryan Adams' new album, So Happy It Hurts, and it's almost like the late '80s never left us, and the oppression of COVID-19 never existed. That's much of the point of this and the 11 other new songs here. Of course, the muscular electric rhythm guitars and generally sunny lyrics take us back to a happier time..."

Steve Baltin of Forbes wrote in the introduction of an interview with Adams: "On this new album, Adams goes back a bit to the feel of his Reckless days sonically. As we also discussed, Adams had a lot of energy in making So Happy It Hurts and it explodes on songs like 'Kick Ass', 'On the Road', 'I Ain't Worth S**t Without You' and more."

In an article for The Telegraph, Sarfraz Manzoor spoke to Adams and commented on the album: "When one recalls the last few years, it is hard to feel optimistic. Unless your name is Bryan Adams. The Canadian rock star... has somehow made an album during a global pandemic which is filled with feel-good rock songs guaranteed to raise spirits and fists in the air. With his excellent new record So Happy It Hurts, one wonders how anyone could live through the last two years and be this cheerful. 'It was just what was coming out of me,' Adams says via Zoom from Madrid. 'I had this optimism, despite what was happening around us, I had this general feeling of it's going to be alright.'"

== Track listing ==
So Happy It Hurts track listing
No.	Title	Writer(s)	Producer(s)	Length
1.	"So Happy It Hurts"	Bryan Adams; Gretchen Peters	Adams	3:35
2.	"Never Gonna Rain"	Adams; Peters; Michael Elizondo; Jason Evigan; Kennedi Lykken	Adams	3:18
3.	"You Lift Me Up"	Adams; Robert John Lange	Adams; Lange	3:08
4.	"I've Been Looking for You"	Adams; James Douglas Vallance	Adams	2:01
5.	"Always Have, Always Will"	Adams; Lange	Adams; Lange	3:46
6.	"On the Road"	Adams; Lange	Adams; Lange	2:49
7.	"Kick Ass"	Adams; Lange	Adams; Lange	5:37
8.	"I Ain't Worth Shit Without You"	Adams; Vallance	Adams	3:11
9.	"Let's Do This"	Adams; Lange	Adams; Lange	3:18
10.	"Just Like Me, Just Like You"	Adams; Vallance	Adams	2:11
11.	"Just About Gone"	Adams; Peters	Adams	2:50
12.	"These Are the Moments That Make Up My Life"	Adams; Peters; Theodore Shapiro	Adams	3:26
Total length:				39:10

Super deluxe edition bonus disc track listing
No.	Title	Writer(s)	Producer(s)	Length
1.	"Summer of '69" (classic version)	Bryan Adams; Jim Vallance	Adams	4:08
2.	"(Everything I Do) I Do It for You" (classic version)	Adams; Michael Kamen; Robert "Mutt" Lange	Adams	6:27
3.	"Run to You" (classic version)	Adams; Vallance	Adams	4:19
4.	"Heaven" (classic version)	Adams; Vallance	Adams	4:27
5.	"Can't Stop This Thing We Started" (classic version)	Adams; Lange	Adams; Lange	4:39
6.	"Cuts Like a Knife" (classic version)	Adams; Vallance	Adams; Vallance	5:23
7.	"Please Forgive Me" (classic version)	Adams; Lange	Adams; Lange	5:13
8.	"Straight from the Heart" (classic version)	Adams; Kagna	Adams	3:28
9.	"When You're Gone" (classic version, featuring Melanie C)	Adams; Kennedy	Adams; Kennedy	3:22
10.	"Here I Am" (classic version)	Adams; Zimmer; Peters	Adams	4:35
11.	"Back to You" (classic version)	Adams; Kennedy	Adams	4:27
12.	"Have You Ever Really Loved a Woman?" (classic version)	Adams; Kamen; Lange	Adams	3:26
Total length:				53:54

== Personnel ==
Musicians

- Bryan Adams – vocals, electric guitar, bass (all tracks); acoustic guitar (1, 3–5, 9–12), backing vocals (2, 7, 9), drums (1–7, 9–12), organ (1, 2, 5, 7–9, 11), percussion (1, 2, 4–6, 9–12), Rhodes piano (3), piano (4, 5)
- Mutt Lange – backing vocals (1, 3, 5–7, 9), keyboards (3, 7, 9), synth bass (3), guitar (7), programmed percussion (9)
- Keith Scott – lead guitar (3, 5, 7, 9), rhythm guitar (1)
- Pat Steward – drums (2, 5, 8), percussion (8)
- Michael Elizondo – backing vocals (2)
- John Cleese – narration (7)
- Luke Doucet – lead guitar (11)
- Theodore Shapiro – keyboard strings (12)

Technical

- Olle Romo – engineering
- Hayden Watson – engineering
- Emily Lazar – mastering
- Chris Allgood – mastering

== Charts ==
=== Weekly charts ===
Weekly chart performance for So Happy It Hurts
Chart (2022)	Peak position
Australian Albums (ARIA)	75
Austrian Albums (Ö3 Austria)	3
Belgian Albums (Ultratop Flanders)	5
Belgian Albums (Ultratop Wallonia)	31
Canadian Albums (Billboard)	29
Czech Albums (ČNS IFPI)	61
Dutch Albums (Album Top 100)	28
French Albums (SNEP)	176
German Albums (Offizielle Top 100)	2
Irish Albums (IRMA)	92
Italian Albums (FIMI)	41
Portuguese Albums (AFP)	1
Scottish Albums (OCC)	3
Spanish Albums (Promusicae)	10
Swiss Albums (Schweizer Hitparade)	2
UK Albums (OCC)	3
UK Independent Albums (OCC)	1
US Top Album Sales (Billboard)	26

=== Year-end charts ===
Year-end chart performance for So Happy It Hurts
Chart (2022)	Position
Swiss Albums (Schweizer Hitparade)	49
