= Classic (Bryan Adams album) =

Classic Classic Pt. II
- Artwork for Classic and Classic Pt. II

Studio album of re-recorded songs by Bryan Adams
- Released: April 1, 2022 (Classic); July 22, 2022 (Classic Pt. II)
- Genre: Rock
- Length: 34:24 (Classic); 30:28 (Classic Pt. II)
- Label: Badams
- Producer: Bryan Adams

Bryan Adams chronology
So Happy It Hurts (2022)	Classic; Classic Pt. II (2022)	Roll With The Punches (2025)

Classic is a series of albums containing re-recorded versions of songs by Canadian singer-songwriter Bryan Adams. It was released digitally through Badams Music Limited on April 1, 2022, and it contains new studio takes of songs from the 1980s and 1990s, including "Summer of '69", "Heaven", "Run to You", and "Please Forgive Me". Classic is the 17th studio release by Adams and the third album he has unveiled in less than one month. On March 4, 2022, he digitally released Pretty Woman – The Musical and on March 11, 2022, he released his 15th official studio album So Happy It Hurts. A second volume, Classic Pt. II, was released on July 22, 2022.

In May 2025, the album was released on combined CD and 2×LP. This release featured 21 tracks—the majority of the "classic versions" as well as several of Adams' recent singles and "All for Love" from the Royal Albert Hall in 2012.

== Background ==
In the run-up to releasing So Happy It Hurts, Bryan Adams spoke about how he decided to re-record his older material after his now-former record label, Universal Music Group, refused to return his original masters. In an interview with Cleveland.com, he said: "I was in the process of renegotiating with Universal (Music Group) and they wouldn't give anything back. I said, 'OK, if you don't want to give them back, I'll make new ones.' It was incredible fun. I'm gonna call the album Classic, maybe Part 1 'cause there'll be a Part 2 I'll finish up this year. This is all part of the fun I've been having. I love the way So Happy It Hurts came out, so much so that I wanted to continue just recording 'cause I felt like we were in a groove, and let's just keep going. So, I've got a lot of music coming out this year—get ready!"

Adams, who performed "Summer of '69" live with Taylor Swift in 2018, cited Swift's 2019-25 masters dispute as an inspiration to also re-record his previous work. "I loved singing with Taylor, in fact I believe it's the best version of the song since the original recording. She and I have been in a similar situation lately with our master recordings... so I've done what she has done to re-record my early songs again. I'm releasing a few in March, so thanks Taylor," Adams told Stereogum.

In a conversation with The Daily Telegraph, Adams said he should have made the album a long time ago: "I feel like a complete numpty for taking so long, I wish I'd done it 10 years ago. But it doesn't matter. It's all right. It's basically something for my kids."

== Track listing ==
Classic track listing
No.	Title	Writer(s)	Length
1.	"Summer of '69"	Bryan Adams; Jim Vallance	4:08
2.	"(Everything I Do) I Do It for You"	Adams; Michael Kamen; Robert John "Mutt" Lange	6:27
3.	"Heaven"	Adams; Vallance	4:23
4.	"Run to You"	Adams; Vallance	4:17
5.	"Please Forgive Me"	Adams; Lange	5:12
6.	"Straight from the Heart"	Adams; Eric Kagna	3:28
7.	"Hidin' from Love"	Adams; Kagna; Vallance	3:03
8.	"Teacher Teacher"	Adams; Vallance	3:22
Total length:			34:24

Classic Pt. II track listing
No.	Title	Writer(s)	Length
1.	"Can't Stop This Thing We Started"	Adams; Lange	4:08
2.	"Cuts Like a Knife"	Adams; Vallance	6:27
3.	"Back to You"	Adams; Eliot Kennedy	4:23
4.	"When You Love Someone"	Adams; Gretchen Peters; Kamen	4:17
5.	"Have You Ever Really Loved a Woman"	Adams; Kamen; Lange	5:12
6.	"When You're Gone" (featuring Melanie C)	Adams; Kennedy	3:28
7.	"Here I Am"	Adams; Peters; Hans Zimmer	3:03
Total length:			30:28

Notes

- All tracks are subtitled "Classic Version".

== Personnel ==
- Bryan Adams – vocals, producer
- Bob Clearmountain – mixing on all tracks except "Hidin' from Love"
- Hayden Watson – engineering, mixing on "Hidin' from Love"

== Charts ==
Chart performance for Classic
Chart (2023)	Peak position
Belgian Albums (Ultratop Flanders)	79
German Albums (Offizielle Top 100)	41
Scottish Albums (OCC)	51
