= So Happy It Hurts (Bryan Adams song) =

2021 single by Bryan Adams

Single by Bryan Adams

from the album So Happy It Hurts
- Released: October 11, 2021
- Genre: Rock
- Length: 3:35
- Label: BMG
- Songwriters: Bryan Adams; Gretchen Peters
- Producer: Bryan Adams

Bryan Adams singles chronology
"Joe and Mary" (2019)	"So Happy It Hurts" (2021)	"On the Road" (2021)

Music video
- "So Happy It Hurts" on YouTube

"So Happy It Hurts" is a song recorded by Bryan Adams. It was first released on October 11, 2021, as the lead single from So Happy It Hurts. The song was nominated for the Grammy Award for Best Rock Performance at the 65th Annual Grammy Awards, Adams' first nomination since 1998.

== Background ==
During the early days of the COVID-19 lockdowns, Adams announced via his social media, that he was working on new songs for his 15th album. The song talks about the return to normalcy after such a surreal time in the heights of the COVID-19 pandemic.

== Music video ==
The song and video are a tribute to the people who experienced distancing during the COVID-19 pandemic. The video was made at The Warehouse Studio in Vancouver. The Adams-directed video, shot in a 1966 Chevrolet Corvair convertible, also features Adams' 93-year-old mother Jane Clark.

== Credits and personnel ==
=== Song ===
- Bryan Adams — vocals, all instruments except where noted, songwriter, producer
- Keith Scott — rhythm guitar
- Mutt Lange – backing vocals
- Gretchen Peters — songwriter
- Hayden Watson — recording engineer
- Olle Romo — recording engineer
- Emily Lazar — recording engineer
- Chris Allgood — recording engineer

=== Video ===
- Bryan Adams — director

== Charts ==
Chart performance for "So Happy It Hurts"
Chart (2021–2022)	Peak position
Canada Digital Song Sales (Billboard)	28
Switzerland (Schweizer Hitparade)	85
