= Roll with the Punches (Bryan Adams album) =

Studio album by Bryan Adams
- Released: 29 August 2025
- Genre: Rock
- Length: 37:21
- Label: Bad
- Producer: Bryan Adams

Bryan Adams chronology
Classic (2022)	Roll with the Punches (2025)	How It's Goin (2026)

Singles from Roll with the Punches
- 1. "Roll with the Punches" Released: 7 February 2025; 2. "Make Up Your Mind" Released: 6 March 2025; 3. "Never Ever Let You Go" Released: 7 May 2025; 4. "A Little More Understanding" Released: 16 July 2025

Roll with the Punches is the sixteenth studio album by the Canadian singer-songwriter Bryan Adams, released on 29 August 2025, on Adams' own Bad Records record label.

== Composition and lyrics ==
The album's title track has been described as a "hefty rock stomper", is about resilience and "the spirit of getting back up no matter how hard you've been knocked down" according to Bryan Adams himself.

== Release and promotion ==
The album's title track was released as the lead single from the album on 7 February 2025, accompanied with a music video. "Make Up Your Mind" was released as the album's second single on 6 March 2025. The third single, "Never Ever Let You Go" was released on 7 May 2025. "A Little More Understanding" was released on 16 July 2025. A tour to promote the album was announced on 23 April 2025, which will reportedly be his biggest tour in years. A special edition was also released that contained a second disc with acoustic recordings, and a boxed set.

In fall of 2025, Adams launched the "Roll with the Punches" tour with performances scheduled at venues throughout North America. The tour continued into 2026.

On 18 April 2026, Adams released Tough Town as a separate vinyl album for Record Store Day, which was previously only available as a bonus disc with the Roll with the Punches deluxe edition box set. A worldwide digital edition of Tough Town was issued on 24 July 2026 across all major streaming services.

== Critical reception ==
Professional ratings
Review scores
Source	Rating
Classic Rock	3.5/5 stars
Rolling Stone Germany	2/5 stars

Classic Rock critic Emma Johnston notes a nod to the song "Proud Mary" by Creedence Clearwater Revival is in the title track's lyrics. Renowned for Sound critic Ryan Bulbeck states it is "as surface level as rock can be", but notes it is enjoyable, concluding that "No doubt fans will eat up what he and his band have cooked up here."

== Track listing ==
All tracks are written by Bryan Adams.

Roll with the Punches track listing
No.	Title	Length
1.	"Roll with the Punches"	3:32
2.	"Make Up Your Mind"	3:38
3.	"Never Ever Let You Go"	3:25
4.	"A Little More Understanding"	4:33
5.	"Life Is Beautiful"	3:03
6.	"Love Is Stronger Than Hate"	3:58
7.	"How's That Workin' for Ya"	2:24
8.	"Two Arms to Hold You"	4:00
9.	"Be the Reason"	2:42
10.	"Will We Ever Be Friends Again"	3:28

Tough Town track listing (Bonus disc / 2026 standalone release)
No.	Title	Writer(s)	Length
1.	"Tough Town"	Bryan Adams; Jim Vallance	4:05
2.	"Sometimes You Lose Before You Win"	Adams; Eliot Kennedy	3:26
3.	"What If There Were No Sides At All"	Adams; Gretchen Peters	2:42
4.	"You're Awesome"	Adams; Mutt Lange	2:49
5.	"Ultimate Love"	Adams; Vallance	3:29
6.	"Tonight In Babylon"	Adams; Peters	3:18
7.	"Nothin' We Can't Do That Can't Be Done"	Adams; Lange	2:03
8.	"Best Of Me"	Adams; Lange	3:31
9.	"Please Stay"	Adams; Vallance	2:35
10.	"Someone's Daughter Someone's Son"	Adams; Lange	4:13

== Personnel ==
Credits adapted from Tidal.

=== Musicians ===
- Bryan Adams – lead vocals, bass, guitar, drums (tracks 1, 4–10), piano (1, 6, 7), background vocals (2–6, 8–10), keyboards (2, 4), percussion (2), organ (6, 7, 9), harmonica (7)
- Pat Steward – drums (1–3)
- Keith Scott – guitar (1, 2, 9, 10)
- Jim Vallance – background vocals (4)
- Mutt Lange – background vocals (1–6, 8–10), keyboards (1, 3, 5, 8, 10)

=== Technical personnel ===
- Bryan Adams – production
- Hayden Watson – engineering, mixing, immersive mixing
- Olle Romo – engineering (1, 3–7, 9)
- Bob Jackson – mastering
- Brian Lee – mastering

== Charts ==
Chart performance for Roll with the Punches
Chart (2025)	Peak position
Australian Albums (ARIA)	62
Austrian Albums (Ö3 Austria)	6
Belgian Albums (Ultratop Flanders)	25
Belgian Albums (Ultratop Wallonia)	128
Dutch Albums (Album Top 100)	71
German Rock & Metal Albums (Offizielle Top 100)	2
Japanese Albums (Oricon)	31
Japanese Combined Albums (Oricon)	44
Japanese Rock Albums (Oricon)	10
Japanese Download Albums (Billboard Japan)	20
Japanese Top Albums Sales (Billboard Japan)	30
Spanish Albums (PROMUSICAE)	48
Swiss Albums (Schweizer Hitparade)	6
UK Albums (Official Charts)	3
UK Independent Albums (Official Charts)	2
US Top Current Album Sales (Billboard)	50
