= I'm Ready (Bryan Adams song) =

Single by Bryan Adams

from the album Unplugged
- Released: April 1998
- Recorded: September 26, 1997
- Genre: Rock
- Length: 4:29
- Label: A&M
- Songwriters: Bryan Adams, Jim Vallance
- Producers: Bryan Adams and Bob Clearmountain (1983 studio version); Bryan Adams and Patrick Leonard (1997 Unplugged version); Zucchero Fornaciari (2001 Italian version)

Bryan Adams singles chronology
"Back to You" (1997)	"I'm Ready" (1998)	"On a Day Like Today" (1998)

Music video
- "I'm Ready" on YouTube

"I'm Ready" is a song by Canadian rock musician Bryan Adams. It was written by Adams and collaborator Jim Vallance. The song was first released in 1979, by Ian Lloyd (formerly of the Stories), on his solo album Goose Bumps. Vallance played the drums on this recording. In 1983, Adams himself recorded the song for his third album, Cuts Like a Knife, as a straightforward rock song with electric guitar and synthesizer. Adams co-produced his version with Bob Clearmountain, who also mixed it.

The song became a hit for Adams in 1998, after its inclusion on his 1997 album Unplugged. Patrick Leonard was producing these sessions, and selected "I'm Ready" to be included in the show. For this concert, the song was re-arranged as an acoustic ballad with string orchestrations added by Michael Kamen, who had previously worked on some of Adams' biggest hits, and played by students of the Juilliard School. It also features a low whistle played by Davy Spillane. In 1998 the song was released as the second single from Unplugged, after "Back to You". This version is also included on the two best-of-compilations The Best of Me and Anthology.

== Italian release ==
In 2001, "I'm Ready" was re-released in Italy with new lyrics, now entitled "Io Vivo (In Te)". The new Italian lyrics were written by Zucchero Fornaciari. Zucchero also produced the new version, basically using the Unplugged recording, and recording new vocals on top of it (notice the audience and some of Bryan's original vocals still audible on the track). Also featured is additional percussion, added by Martyn Philips using Pro Tools. Philips, along with Randy Staub engineered "Io Vivo (In Te)"; the latter also mixing the track (originally mixed by Bob Clearmountain). The single uses the same picture and colour scheme as the original release of "I'm Ready", only using a different font.

== Music video ==
The music video was directed by Nigel Dick, although footage of the original performance was also shown on MTV, prior to the single being released.

== Personnel ==
=== Studio version ===
- Bryan Adams – lead and backing vocals, guitar
- Keith Scott – guitar, guitar solo
- Tommy Mandel – Hammond B3 organ, synthesizer
- Dave Taylor – bass
- Mickey Curry – drums
- Lou Gramm – backing vocals

== Charts ==
=== Weekly charts ===
Chart (1998)	Peak position
Belgium (Ultratip Bubbling Under Flanders)	12
Canada Top Singles (RPM)	11
Canada Adult Contemporary (RPM)	1
Estonia (Eesti Top 20)	1
Europe (Eurochart Hot 100)	98
Germany (GfK)	66
Netherlands (Dutch Top 40)	26
Netherlands (Single Top 100)	24
Scottish Singles Sales (Official Charts)	22
UK Singles (Official Charts)	20

=== Year-end charts ===
Chart (1998)	Position
Canada Top Singles (RPM)	73
Canada Adult Contemporary (RPM)	8
