= Unplugged (Bryan Adams album) =

Live album by Bryan Adams
- Released: December 9, 1997
- Recorded: September 26, 1997
- Venue: Hammerstein Ballroom, New York City, New York
- Genre: Rock, acoustic rock
- Length: 52:26
- Label: A&M
- Producer: Bryan Adams, Patrick Leonard

Bryan Adams chronology
18 til I Die (1996)	Unplugged (1997)	On a Day Like Today (1998)

Singles from Unplugged
- 1. "Back to You" Released: December 8, 1997; 2. "I'm Ready" Released: April 1998

Professional ratings
Review scores
Source	Rating
AllMusic	3/5 stars
Entertainment Weekly	B
NME	3/10 stars
The Rolling Stone Album Guide	2/5 stars
Los Angeles Times	3/4 stars
MusicHound Rock	3/5 stars
Uncut	4/5 stars

Unplugged is an acoustic live album by Canadian musician Bryan Adams. The album was recorded completely on September 26, 1997, at the Hammerstein Ballroom in New York City. Recorded by David Hewitt and Bob Clearmountain on the Remote Recording Silver Truck. Adams was joined by Irish piper Davy Spillane and Michael Kamen who wrote orchestrations for many of the songs and brought students from the Juilliard School to play them. Three new songs were included; "Back To You", "When You Love Someone", and "A Little Love". The song "If Ya Wanna Be Bad - Ya Gotta Be Good" makes its debut on an album, originally appearing on the B-side of "Let's Make a Night to Remember" - to which it is paired on the Unplugged album. Absent from both the CD and DVD is "Hey Elvis", which is available on the single of "Back To You". A second single was released in early 1998, an acoustic reworking of the hard rock song, "I'm Ready".

The album included only thirteen of the songs recorded at the show. The MTV Unplugged DVD included a few different songs and the song order is also different from on the CD.

The record sold over 2,500,000 units worldwide.

== Track listing ==
No.	Title	Writer(s)	Length
1.	"Summer of '69"	Adams, Vallance	4:02
2.	"Back to You"	Adams, Kennedy	4:30
3.	"Cuts Like a Knife"	Adams, Vallance	5:04
4.	"I'm Ready"	Adams, Vallance	4:29
5.	"Fits Ya Good"	Adams, Vallance	3:02
6.	"When You Love Someone"	Adams, Kamen, Peters	3:41
7.	"18 til I Die"	Adams, Lange	3:31
8.	"I Think About You"	Adams, Peters	2:36
9.	"If Ya Wanna Be Bad – Ya Gotta Be Good/Let's Make a Night to Remember"	Adams, Peters/Adams, Lange	4:35
10.	"The Only Thing That Looks Good on Me Is You"	Adams, Lange	4:34
11.	"A Little Love"	Adams, Kennedy, Peters	3:23
12.	"Heaven"	Adams, Vallance	4:31
13.	"I'll Always Be Right There"	Adams, Lange	4:28

Japan 2012 SHM-CD bonus tracks
No.	Title	Writer(s)	Length
14.	"Back to You" (original demo version; from "I'm Ready" single)	Adams, Kennedy	5:06
15.	"(I Wanna Be) Your Underwear" (unplugged)	Adams, Lange	1:31

DVD track listing
No.	Title	Writer(s)	Length
1.	"Summer of '69"	Adams, Vallance	4:23
2.	"Cuts Like a Knife"	Adams, Vallance	5:15
3.	"I'm Ready"	Adams, Vallance	4:39
4.	"Back to You"	Adams, Kennedy	4:28
5.	"Fits Ya Good"	Adams, Vallance	3:02
6.	"When You Love Someone"	Adams, Kamen, Peters	3:41
7.	"18 til I Die"	Adams, Lange	3:41
8.	"I Think About You"	Adams, Peters	2:36
9.	"If Ya Wanna Be Bad – Ya Gotta Be Good"	Adams, Peters	2:19
10.	"Let's Make a Night to Remember"	Adams, Lange	2:11
11.	"(I Wanna Be) Your Underwear"	Adams, Lange	1:24
12.	"A Little Love"	Adams, Kennedy, Peters	3:25
13.	"Can't Stop This Thing We Started"	Adams, Vallance	3:17
14.	"It Ain't a Party...If You Can't Come Round"	Adams, Lange	1:19
15.	"Heaven"	Adams, Vallance	4:39
16.	"I'll Always Be Right There"	Adams, Kamen, Lange	4:35

== Personnel ==
Credits adapted from the album's liner notes.

Musicians

- Bryan Adams – lead vocals, guitar, Dobro, harmonica
- Keith Scott – guitar, mandolin, Dobro, slide guitar, harmony vocals
- Dave Taylor – bass, harmony vocals
- Tommy Mandel – piano, organ, accordion
- Patrick Leonard – piano, organ
- Mickey Curry – drums, harmony vocals
- Danny Cummings – percussion, harmony vocals
- Davy Spillane – Uilleann pipes, low whistles

Strings

- Michael Kamen – arrangements and conductor
- Tom Nazelli, Douglas Quint and Scott Starrett – additional arrangements
- Jesse Levy – coordinator
- Students of the Juilliard School of Music:
  - Darrett Adkins, Maria Ahn, Raphael Bell and Nina Lee – cello
  - Pete Donovan – double bass
  - Ed Malave, Tania Halko and Alejandra Mahave – viola
  - Angella Ahn, Cornelius Dufallo, Ani Gregorian, Ara Gregorian, Lyris Hung, Amy Kauffman, Jennifer Newell and James Tsao – violin

== Production ==
- Bryan Adams – producer, arrangements
- Patrick Leonard – producer, arrangements
- Bob Clearmountain – engineer, mixing
- Dave Hewitt – engineer
- Phil Gitomer – assistant engineer
- Dean Maher – mix assistant
- Chris Potter – mix assistant
- Olle Romo – mix assistant
- Phil Western – mix assistant
- Glen Collette – monitor mixing
- Joey Perpick – live sound mix engineer
- Ron Vermeulen – technical assistant
- Bob Ludwig – mastering at Gateway Mastering (Portland, Maine)
- Val Dauksts – production manager
- Don "Toe" Prodaehl – tour manager
- Tom O'Quinn – art direction, design
- Glen Ross – art direction, design
- Sandy Brummels – art direction, design
- Danny Clinch – photography
- Bruce Allen – management
- Chris Chappel – tour management

Technicians

- Dennis Fitzmartin (keyboards)
- Lance Stadnyk (Bryan Adams' guitars)
- Rick Salazar (Keith Scott's guitars)
- Lorne Wheaton (drums)

MTV Credits

- Milton Lage – director
- Alex Coletti – producer
- Jac Benson – co-producer

== Charts ==
=== Weekly charts ===
Chart (1997–1998)	Peak position
Australian Albums (ARIA)	28
Austrian Albums (Ö3 Austria)	7
Belgian Albums (Ultratop Flanders)	2
Belgian Albums (Ultratop Wallonia)	37
Canadian Albums (Billboard)	10
Dutch Albums (Album Top 100)	15
European Albums (Music & Media)	10
Finnish Albums (Suomen virallinen lista)	19
German Albums (Offizielle Top 100)	8
Hungarian Albums (MAHASZ)	34
New Zealand Albums (RMNZ)	16
Norwegian Albums (VG-lista)	22
Scottish Albums (OCC)	46
Swedish Albums (Sverigetopplistan)	54
Swiss Albums (Schweizer Hitparade)	3
UK Albums (OCC)	19
US Billboard 200	88

Chart (2026)	Peak position
Greek Albums (IFPI)	26

=== Year-end charts ===
Chart (1997)	Position
Australian Albums (ARIA)	92
Belgian Albums (Ultratop Flanders)	16

Chart (1998)	Position
Austrian Albums (Ö3 Austria)	47
Belgian Albums (Ultratop Flanders)	47
Canada Top Albums/CDs (RPM)	33
Dutch Albums (Album Top 100)	51
German Albums (Offizielle Top 100)	42
Swiss Albums (Schweizer Hitparade)	23

== Certifications ==
=== Album ===
Region	Certification	Certified units/sales
Argentina (CAPIF)	Gold	30,000^{^}
Australia (ARIA)	Gold	35,000^{^}
Austria (IFPI Austria)	Gold	25,000^{*}
Belgium (BRMA)	Gold	25,000^{*}
Germany (BVMI)	Gold	250,000^{^}
Japan (RIAJ)	Gold	100,000^{^}
New Zealand (RMNZ)	Gold	7,500^{^}
Spain (Promusicae)	Gold	50,000^{^}
Switzerland (IFPI Switzerland)	Platinum	50,000^{^}
United Kingdom (BPI)	Platinum	300,000^{^}
United States	—	275,000
Summaries
Europe (IFPI)	2× Platinum	2,000,000^{*}
Worldwide	—	2,500,000
^{*} Sales figures based on certification alone.^{^} Shipments figures based on certification alone.

=== DVD ===
Region	Certification	Certified units/sales
United Kingdom (BPI)	Gold	25,000^{^}
^{*} Sales figures based on certification alone.^{^} Shipments figures based on certification alone.
