= Tonight We Have the Stars =

Single by Bryan Adams

from the album 11
- Released: May 30, 2008
- Recorded: 2008
- Genre: Rock
- Length: 4:05
- Label: Universal/Polydor
- Songwriters: Bryan Adams; Jim Vallance; Gretchen Peters
- Producer: Bryan Adams

Bryan Adams singles chronology
"I Thought I'd Seen Everything" (2008)	"Tonight We Have the Stars" (2008)	"She's Got a Way" (2008)

"Tonight We Have the Stars" is a rock song written by Bryan Adams, Gretchen Peters and Jim Vallance for Adams' tenth studio album 11 (2008). The song's musical-style and production were heavily inspired by rock and pop music from the 1980s, and its lyrics chronicles a relationship. The single was released worldwide on May 30, 2008 and later as a digital single on June 6, 2008. The B-side is a live solo acoustic performance of "Somethin' to Believe In" in Barcelona, Spain from his digital UK EP "Live From Barcelona".

== Recording and production ==
"Tonight We Have the Stars" was written by Adams, Gretchen Peters and Jim Vallance. When writing the song, the three e-mailed each other's audio files back and forth, with each of them commenting on the song when received. This process continued until the song was completed. As Vallance later wrote on his webpage;

"This is my 'first draft' of 'Tonight We Have The Stars' (the original "audio email" that I sent to Bryan). It was a quick recording done in my home studio in Vancouver, but Bryan was able to turn this humble snippet into a song."

The song was mixed by Bob Clearmountain at his studio in Los Angeles. As stated by Vallance: "I was in Canada, Bryan was in Brazil, and Ben Dobie was in England. Give or take a few milliseconds, we were all hearing the mix "live", streaming on a dedicated, encrypted iTunes channel." After each pass of mixing Vallance and Adams would send comments to him on iChat. After giving Clearmountain a comment he would "roll tape" again, and we'd hear the suggested changes unfold in close-to-real time. As stated by Vallance:

"This might not seem unique to everyone, but for me, considering the technology that existed when I started in the music business nearly 40 years ago, this is like science fiction. I can only imagine where things will be, 40 years from now!"

== Reception ==
Following statement is from a review by Kirk LaPointe, managing editor of The Vancouver Sun;

"Arguably the strongest song on 11, Tonight We Have The Stars has a serendipitous quality that speaks volumes about how Bryan works and networks: a lyric from last decade with Gretchen Peters, a new piece of music sent by Vallance and a new melody from Adams. He pulled the pieces off his Mac on an airplane and began mumbling the result to the surprise of his seatmates. Presto, the song that built the foundation for the album".

Darryl Sterdan, in his review for Jam! have stated that the song is "a classic Adams opening gambit -- he starts out with moody verses, then kicks into gear with an arena-ready chorus". However MusicOMH was not too impressed by the song calling it has "requisite croaky vocals and anthemic radio-friendly chorus, but there's nothing to move or touch you."

== Music video ==
The Music video for the song is identical to the previous single's video. Bryan and his band play the song live in a studio. It was available on his website for a time, and is to be included with the upcoming DVD.

== Track listing ==
No.	Title	Writer(s)	Length
1.	"Tonight We Have the Stars"	Adams, Vallance, Peters	4:05
2.	"Somethin' to Believe In (Live In Barcelona)"	Adams, Kennedy	3:02

== Personnel ==
- Bryan Adams – vocals, electric & acoustic guitars, bass, production
- Colin Cripps – guitar
- Gary Breit – Hammond organ, piano
- Mickey Curry – drums
