= Let Me Take You Dancing =

Single by Bryan Adams
- A-side: "Let Me Take You Dancing"
- B-side: "Don't Turn Me Away"
- Released: November 6, 1978
- Recorded: 1978
- Studio: Pinewood Studios, Vancouver
- Genre: Disco
- Length: 3:01
- Label: A&M
- Songwriters: Bryan Adams; Jim Vallance
- Producers: Bryan Adams; Jim Vallance

Bryan Adams singles chronology
"Let Me Take You Dancing" (1978)	"Give Me Your Love" (1980)

"Let Me Take You Dancing" is a song co-written and recorded by Canadian artist Bryan Adams. It was written by Bryan Adams and Jim Vallance and was later remixed by John Luongo. It is notable for being Adams' first solo single and his first ever release as a solo artist when he was 19.

== Background ==
A disco influenced pop song in its original mix, the popular remixed version of the song is even more disco-oriented. It was one of the first songs that Adams and Vallance wrote together and was based on a rag-time piano riff that Vallance had written. The writing took place during February 1978 and the song was recorded at Pinewood Studios by Geoff Turner. The song was originally released as a pop song, but was taken by his record company and remixed.

Co-writer Jim Vallance stated that "I don't doubt the single's success contributed to Bryan eventually being signed directly to the label [A&M Records]".

== Releases ==
The song was first released in Canada in 1978:

- 7" (promo) with the original version on both sides. (Cat # DJ-AM468)
- 7" (retail) with "Don't Turn Me Away" as the B-side track. (Cat # AM-474)

Later was released in 1979 elsewhere:

- 12" (retail): Contains John Luongo's disco mix on A side and an instrumental of the mix on B side. Cat # SP-12014.
- 12" (Dutch retail): identical to above except front cover labeled "Disco Version". Cat # AMS12.7610
- 7" (UK promo): Contains original version on A side and "Don't Turn Me Away" on B side. Cat # AMS7460
- 7" (Mexican Promo): Contains original version on the A side and the John Luongo disco mix on the B side. Cat # AM-097Z
- 7" (US promo): Contains original Stereo version on A side. B side track is Mono. Cat # 2163
- 7" (European retail): Contains "Don't Turn Me Away" on B side. Cat # unknown

== Remixes ==
Although the single had some minor radio success, respected remixer John Luongo was recruited to make it sound like a proper disco track ready for release in the United States. The song went to number 22 on the disco chart.

- In 1978 Prism recorded "Don’t Turn Me Away" as a demo for the See Forever Eyes album, however it never made it to the final release.

== Personnel ==
Original single:

- Bryan Adams: lead vocal, harmony
- Jim Vallance: drums, bass, keyboards
- Wayne Kozak: tenor sax, baritone sax
- Don Clark: trumpet
- Joani Taylor: backing vocals
- Rosalyn Keene: backing vocals
- Nancy Nash (possibly): backing vocals
- Mary Saxton (possibly): backing vocals

Added during Luongo Remix session:

- Jim Vallance: percussion, vibraphone
- Ray Ayotte: congas

== Availability ==
The John Luongo 12" remix of "Let Me Take You Dancing", was released on CD in 2002 as part of compilation album Disco Box Vol 2: Disco Heat. The extended version (6:15) of "Let Me Take You Dancing" is available on the 1994 Hot Classics 12 CD. A shortened version (3:04) of "Let Me Take You Dancing" is available on the 1993 continuous mix CD, The Dance Classic Showcase Volume 1 (mixed by D.J. John Daru).

Currently, the only method to acquire "Let Me Take You Dancing" or "Don't Turn Me Away" is by purchasing the original record. Also, the only method to acquire the instrumental version of "Let Me Take You Dancing" is by purchasing the record of the John Luongo 12" remix, which is the "B" side of said record.

== Adams' disavowing ==
According to Vallance, Adams has since distanced himself from the higher octave vocal style used in the original recording, which was a holdover from the period when he was the lead singer of Sweeney Todd. As for the remix, Luongo chose to increase the tempo of the song, but there was no time-compression technology at that time so this increased the pitch of Adams' vocals. Adams was disappointed with the sped-up sound, making him sound like a woman, according to many listeners. Adams has only performed it live on a handful of occasions. Despite being a single, neither "Let Me Take You Dancing" (except for the 12" disco mix) or its B Side, "Don't Turn Me Away", has appeared on an official CD release as of 2014, nor has been available for purchase online.

As a result of his disavowing, Adams refuses to license this song for any purpose, intentionally keeping this song off streaming services, and as a result, the song is not available on Spotify, Apple Music, Amazon Music, or any streaming platform. As of 2026, Web Sheriff, which Bryan Adams has been a client of since 2008, actively issues takedowns against fan uploads and attempts to upload this song digitally on Adams' behalf, especially on YouTube.
