= Dominick Miserandino =

American entrepreneur and journalist (born 1972)

Dominick A. Miserandino
- Born: November 22, 1972 (age 53); Brooklyn, New York, USA
- Occupations: Entrepreneurship, author and journalist
- Awards: PCLI Phil Spahn Award; Long Island Business News's 40-Under-40 award
- Website: www.miserandino.com

Dominick Miserandino (born November 22, 1972) is an American entrepreneur, author and journalist. He is also the founder and executive editor of the TheCelebrityCafe.com online magazine which publishes celebrity interviews, travel stories, movie, CD, book reviews, contests and trivia games.

== Career ==
As a recipient of the PCLI Phil Spahn Award, and Long Island Business News' 40-Under-40 award, he was President of the Press Club of Long Island's board from 2011 to 2014 (a chapter of the Society of Professional Journalists ). He was a member of the Society of Professional Journalists’ pro chapter and is currently the treasurer. He has also published two books on traveling that also highlight his sense of humor one of which is How to Survive Your First Year of Marriage by Traveling Mother-in-Laws, Shopping, and Baby Talk, Oh My!

From 2018 Miserandino was chief executive officer of the news aggregator Inquisitr. During his tenure the site returned to profitability, reported 240% revenue growth in 2019, and increased reliance on traffic from mobile aggregators such as TopBuzz and Flipboard.

He later became CEO of RetailWire, a retail-industry discussion platform. In January 2025 the site announced monthly unique visitors had exceeded 1.3 million during 2024.

In May 2025 Miserandino was appointed chief marketing officer of Mobile Global Esports Inc. (OTC: MGAM).

From 2011 to 2014 he was president of the Press Club of Long Island, a chapter of the Society of Professional Journalists.
