= Back to You (Bryan Adams song) =

1997 single by Bryan Adam

Single by Bryan Adams

from the album Unplugged
- B-side: "Hey Elvis"; "Can't Stop This Thing We Started / It Ain't a Party...If You Can't Come 'Round"
- Released: December 8, 1997
- Length: 4:30
- Label: A&M
- Songwriters: Bryan Adams; Eliot Kennedy
- Producer: Bob Rock

Bryan Adams singles chronology
"I Finally Found Someone" (1996)	"Back to You" (1997)	"I'm Ready" (1998)

"Back to You" is a song by Canadian singer Bryan Adams, written by Adams and Eliot Kennedy. It was released in December 1997, by A&M Records, as a live acoustic version for Adams' album MTV Unplugged and features students from the Juilliard School, conducted by Michael Kamen. Upon its release, the song became Adams' ninth number-one single in his home country, staying at number one on the RPM Top Singles chart for three nonconsecutive weeks, and reached the top 40 in Australia, Hungary, Iceland, and the United Kingdom. It was later included on his compilation albums The Best of Me and Anthology.

"Back to You" was later re-recorded in the studio for the compilation release Classic Pt. II, and also appeared on the Classic bonus disc of the super deluxe edition of So Happy It Hurts. Both Classic Pt. II and the bonus disc were released in 2022.

The B-sides are two tracks performed the same night as the album; however, "Can't Stop This Thing We Started / It Ain't a Party...If You Can't Come 'Round" is only featured on the MTV Unplugged DVD while "Hey Elvis" was previously unreleased.

== Critical reception ==
Larry Flick from Billboard magazine wrote, "Here is the bouncy, uptempo pop single that Adams' longtime fans have been longing for. A new tune that will be featured on the singer's forthcoming Unplugged collection, 'Back to You' has a sweet acoustic feel and deserves to easily glide onto top 40 playlists. The chorus has instant sing-along potential, and Adams delivers every syllable with an "aw-shucks" romantic flair. At the same time, there's enough bite in the instrumentation to keep mainstream rock radio listeners happily engaged. An excellent single that leaves you hankering for more."

== Track listing ==
No.	Title	Writer(s)	Length
1.	"Back to You"	Bryan Adams, Eliot Kennedy	4:30
2.	"Hey Elvis"	Adams, Gretchen Peters	3:41
3.	"Can't Stop This Thing We Started / It Ain't a Party...If You Can't Come 'Round"	Adams, Robert John "Mutt" Lange	4:40

== Personnel ==
- Bryan Adams – guitar, vocals
- Keith Scott – lead guitar, vocal harmonies
- Dave Taylor – bass, vocal harmonies
- Micky Curry – drums, vocal harmonies
- Danny Cummings – percussion, vocal harmonies
- Tommy Mandel – piano
- Michael Kamen – string arrangement and conductor

== Charts ==
=== Weekly charts ===
Chart (1997–1998)	Peak position
Australia (ARIA)	38
Belgium (Ultratip Bubbling Under Flanders)	3
Canada Top Singles (RPM)	1
Canada Adult Contemporary (RPM)	1
Canada Rock/Alternative (RPM)	4
Estonia (Eesti Top 20)	6
Europe (Eurochart Hot 100)	82
Germany (GfK)	62
Hungary (Mahasz)	4
Iceland (Íslenski Listinn Topp 40)	29
Italy Airplay (Music & Media)	1
Netherlands (Dutch Top 40 Tipparade)	20
Netherlands (Single Top 100)	77
Scottish Singles Sales (Official Charts)	19
Sweden (Sverigetopplistan)	56
UK Singles (Official Charts)	18
US Radio Songs (Billboard)	42
US Adult Contemporary (Billboard)	14
US Adult Pop Airplay (Billboard)	27
US Pop Airplay (Billboard)	19

=== Year-end charts ===
Chart (1998)	Position
Canada Top Singles (RPM)	9
Canada Adult Contemporary (RPM)	11
US Adult Contemporary (Billboard)	44
US Adult Top 40 (Billboard)	78
US Mainstream Top 40 (Billboard)	92

== Release history ==
Region	Date	Format(s)	Label(s)	Ref.
United States	November 25, 1997	Contemporary hit radio	A&M	
United Kingdom	December 8, 1997	CD; cassette	A&M	
