= 11 (Bryan Adams album) =

Studio album by Bryan Adams
- Released: March 17, 2008
- Recorded: 2007–2008
- Studio: The Warehouse Studio, Vancouver, Canada
- Genre: Soft rock
- Length: 43:02
- Label: Polydor
- Producer: Bryan Adams; Robert John "Mutt" Lange (tracks 1 and 5 only)

Bryan Adams chronology
Anthology (2005)	11 (2008)	Tracks of My Years (2014)

Singles from 11
- 1. "I Thought I'd Seen Everything" Released: March 1, 2008; 2. "Tonight We Have the Stars" Released: May 30, 2008; 3. "She's Got a Way" Released: September 2008

11 is the eleventh studio album by Canadian singer-songwriter Bryan Adams. The album was released by Polydor Records on March 17, 2008. 11 was the first release of new Adams material since Colour Me Kubrick in 2005 and the first studio album in four years since Room Service. Adams, Jim Vallance, Eliot Kennedy, Gretchen Peters, Trevor Rabin and Robert John "Mutt" Lange received producing and writing credits. Similar to Adams' previous material, the themes in 11 are mainly based on love, romance, and relationships. 11 received generally mixed reviews from contemporary music critics.

Three songs were released from the album in various forms: "I Thought I'd Seen Everything", "Tonight We Have the Stars" and "She's Got a Way", of which all were released internationally. "I Thought I'd Seen Everything" was the only one to have any lasting effects on the music chart, reaching mostly the Top 50, Top 100 and Top 200 in Europe and Canada. Adams was nominated for a Juno Award in the category "Best Artist" in 2009 for this record.

The album peaked within the top ten in eleven territories worldwide, including Canada (with sales just below 10,000 units in its first week), the United Kingdom, Germany, Denmark and Switzerland. 11 charted within the top twenty in three other territories.

== Conception ==
In an interview on Canada AM, Adams said the title 11 was picked because it was his 11th studio album, when soundtrack album Spirit: Stallion of the Cimarron is included. In addition, Adams mentioned there was no hidden meaning behind the title, it was his eleventh studio release and contained eleven tracks, "there are no secondary meanings" as Adams later mentioned in an interview with the BBC. The album's cover was taken during a photo shoot in a hotel in Switzerland, while Adams was doing a self-photo story for an Italian men's magazine. Adams ended up liking the photo so much that he ended up using it as the album's cover

As with the previous album, Room Service, significant portions of the album were produced while on tour. According to co-writer Jim Vallance modern technology and equipment made it a lot easier to record the album. Adams recorded the album while on tour, making use of the time between playing on stage and readying himself for the next gig. Vallance and Adams recorded the album normally while sitting backstage or in a hotel room with small devices which they usually carried along on tours, but especially during their off days. Adams, in an interview, mentioned that when recording a song, they needed to set up mattresses against the windows, and having microphones run through the toilet.

11 was originally going to be an acoustic record, aiming for the "soft-hard approach" perfected by the British rock group, The Who. However, after a long tour, some of the acoustic songs started growing on him, which led to changes. Adams would record for a few hours, until he wheeled the whole recording kit back onstage. "It makes me a little more interested in going on tour," he said in retrospect. Adams who was never fully committed to the idea of creating a full-fledged acoustic album, decided not to after seeing an acoustic band opening for him during one of his concerts. What he saw made him certain that he was not able to create such an album.

== Writing and themes ==
When the writing season for 11 had ended, Adams and his companions had written 30 songs. After a selection process, 19 of these songs were removed, however some of them made it to the deluxe edition released later in 2008. The first single, "I Thought I'd Seen Everything" was written in 2007, and went through two or three changes before Adams made the finishing touches. Originally, it had another title, and a different melody, and as Adams later put it; "in the course of listening to the music and spending time with it, you do end up changing it.

Adams hadn't worked together on an album with Vallance since the late-1980s. They teamed up after, as Adams said, "throwing ideas back and forth" from 2003 until the album was released. Vallance would send MP3 audio files by e-mail to Adams during the recording seasons. Adams would then add some elements to them and send them back. They continued doing this until a song was completed; Vallance claimed it took longer for them to write songs than during their previous collaborations, but felt the end product was just as good.

The main themes in the album, in Adams words are; "searching for something". The lyrical meaning behind track number four, "Oxygen" is what a person needs to survive. In other words, "The person you are with is giving you the air you breathe", and that people in general "need each other 100%." The album's first single, "I Thought I'd Seen Everything" is about keeping an open mind." The theme of "Broken Wings" is about "somebody who taught me how to fly", a metaphor which for "putting your trust in somebody who can give you faith and the belief that you can succeed." "Something to Believe In" is based upon the affirmation of life and faith, while "Walk on By" warns the listener of distrustfulness. As with other albums, according to Adams, he likes to end the album with a melancholic song, such as "Something to Believe In" in 11, it's not the last track however. "Flowers Gone Wild" touches on the same theme as two songs he wrote in the early 1980s, "Cover Girl" and "The Best Is Yet To Come", are based upon the murdered playboy bunny Dorothy Stratten. But also people with misplaced emotions and their unfulfilled needs, which are pushed forth by the media, which Adams says, leads people to lose their "sense of decency". Adams explained further; "It's a sort of new love affair with an old story, devouring our celebrities and leaving them when we are done."

== Release ==
The finishing touches to the album were done in September 2007, but the European release of the album was delayed until March 2008. The album was released independently in the United States exclusively through Wal-Mart and Sam's Club retail stores on May 13, 2008. The deal was brokered one month after the albums international release. On October 5, 2008, a Deluxe Edition of 11 was announced on Adams website. The album featured new tracks and contained a DVD. The Deluxe Edition was released on November 10, 2008, in the UK, and November 11, in Canada. The new CD featured the original 11 tracks, a new song "Saved" and the inclusion of two B-sides, "Way of the World" and "Miss America". The remix of "She's Got a Way" replaces the original version, but includes another remix done by Chicane. The DVD features Adams, and his backing band, rehearsing the material from the album. It also contains behind the scenes footages.

=== Critical response ===
Professional ratings
Review scores
Source	Rating
AllMusic	2/5 stars
BBC Music	favorable
Houston Press	favorable
Jam!	(average)
musicOMH	2/5 stars
People	2.5/4 stars
The Sunday Times	2/5 stars
The Vancouver Sun	favorable
Virgin Media	2/5 stars

11 overall received mixed, but mostly unflattering reviews from critics. Music reviewer Chris Jones from the BBC wrote generally positively about 11 in his review. He concluded that it was another strong album, even if Adams voice sounded dispassionate on some tracks. The Canadian website Jam! gave the album an average review. Reviewer Darryl Stedan found the lyrics clichéd, predictable and, while not criticising it, described it as an album "that didn't really mean much." Ryan Wasoba from the alternatively weekly magazine, Houston Press wrote favorably of the record in a backhanded way, commenting that 11's appeal laid in its "inoffensiveness" and "digestibility". Amy O'Brian of The Vancouver Sun wrote favorably of the new album, while at the same time criticising it for its clichés, bad lyrics and for its too-familiar melodies, and concluded, "It's cheesy and overdone, but the truth is that it just might give Adams his first hit in a decade."

Stephen Thomas Erlewine from AllMusic gave the record two out of five stars, saying that Adams' "fondness for obvious hooks" had "flattened into clichés". Matt O'Leary from Virgin Media criticised the album for Adams's "over-familiar trademark" and very clichéd, made the over-familiar sound of 11 a little more "irksome". O'Leary gave the album two out of five stars. The Sunday Times reviewer Steve Jelbert wrote, "Eleven studio albums into his career, the Canadian rocker returns with a set so devoid of surprises that it could easily have been created with a computer program." He continued by criticising the album for what he saw as mundane lyrical metaphors, attempts of copying U2 and rigid one-note basslines. He concluded however that the album was better than Lenny Kravitz latest effort, It Is Time for a Love Revolution. Chuck Arnold and Christina Tapper of People gave the album two-and-a-half stars out of four and stated that the 11 songs "show that, at 48, Adams is still capable of capturing the essence of young, unbridled love. Sure, the guy can get sappy, but he's always sincere."

=== Chart and commercial performance ===
11 was Adams' first studio album to be released in four years, since Room Service in 2004. In the album's first week of release it sold just below 10,000 units in Canada, and debuted at number one on the Canadian Albums Chart and stayed on the chart for four weeks. This marked the first time since Waking Up the Neighbours in 1991, that Adams was able to top the Canadian record chart. In the United States, it debuted at number 80 on the Billboard 200 on the charts issue date of May 31, 2008, and stayed on the chart for four weeks. 11 was Adams' first studio album since 18 til I Die in the US to crack the top 100. 11 stayed longer on the American and Canadian record than did Room Service. 11 peaked at three on the European Albums Chart and stayed on the chart for ten weeks, the album and reached seven at the Independent Albums Chart and stayed there for five weeks. At the 2009 Juno Awards Adams was nominated for "Artist of the Year" due to 11.

Internationally, 11 was a commercial success. The album peaked at number one in two countries, India and Switzerland. It also charted within the top ten in several countries, including the United Kingdom, Switzerland, India, Germany, Austria, Denmark, Portugal and The Netherlands. France was the album's least successful charting territory, peaking within the top 200 at number 157. Switzerland was the only country in Europe were 11 managed to top a record chart. After staying there for a full 13 weeks if fell off the chart from 81. Because of sales of over 15,000 units, the album was certified gold in Switzerland and Denmark. The album has sold over half a million units worldwide.

The first single, "I Thought I'd Seen Everything" was released as a download only single in the UK on March 17, 2008. Although it was officially released to US radio on March 1, 2008, it proved somewhat popular on Adult Contemporary radio stations where it peaked at No. 21. In Canada "I Thought I'd Seen Everything" was officially released to radio in March 2008. The song reached the top 50 on the Canadian Hot 100 where it peaked at No. 47. "Tonight We Have the Stars", the second single, was released as a digital single on June 6, 2008. The third and last single, "She's Got a Way" was released in September and did not chart anywhere in North America or Europe.

== 11 Tour ==
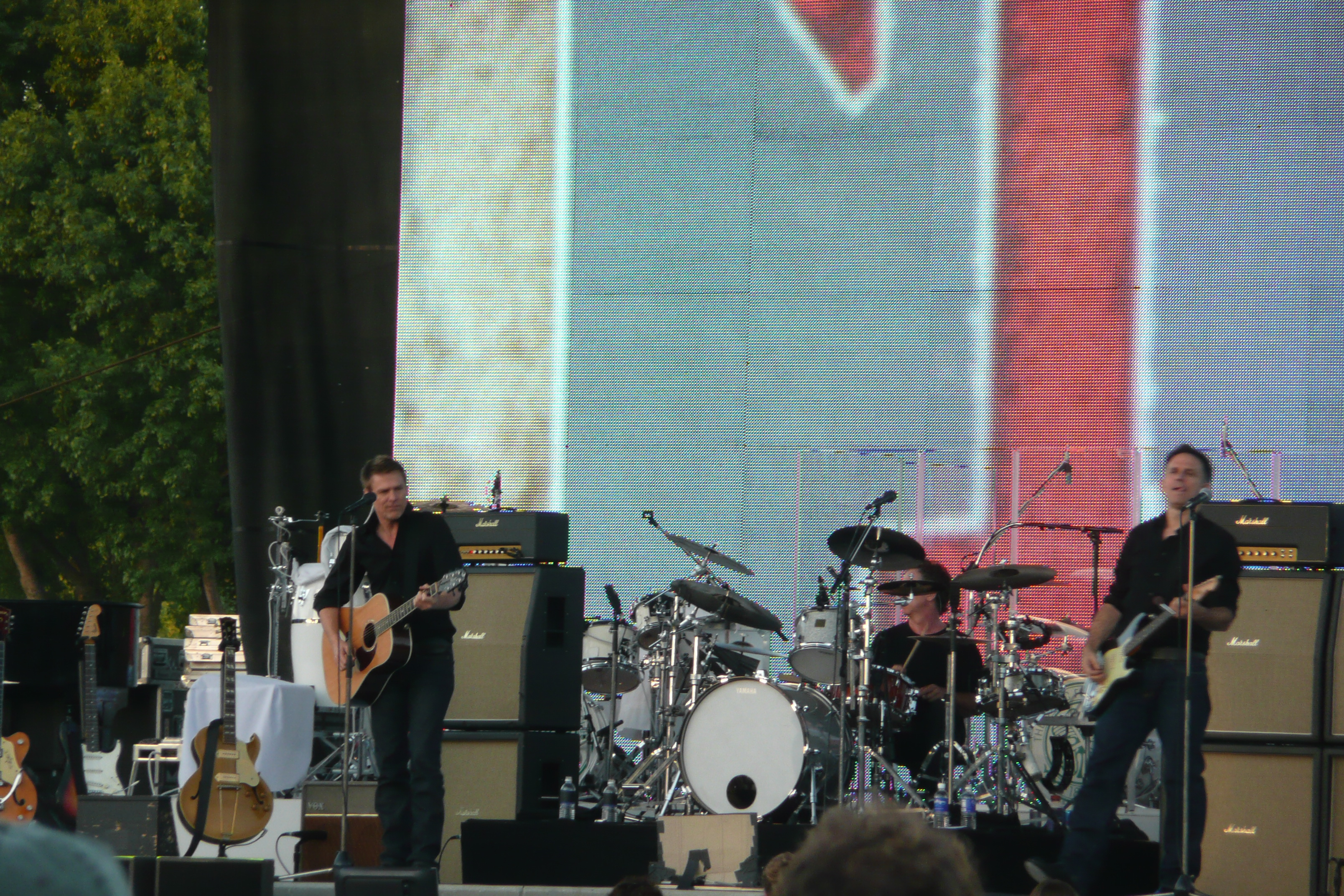
Adams on stage during his tour promoting 11 in Paso Robles, California, US on July 30, 2008

In support of 11, Adams started the "11 concerts, 11 cities" tour, having concerts in 11 countries in just 11 days. The intimate shows at some spectacular venues saw Adams perform an acoustic set, on stage, with just his guitar and harmonica. The London show was on the March 11, 2008, at St. James Church in Piccadilly. The last stop of his 11 days concert tour was in Copenhagen, Denmark on March 17. After the "11 concerts, 11 cities" tour, Adams continued to promote his album, this time on an acoustic tour touring with such musical acts as Foreigner and Rod Stewart. Later, in an interview, he was asked what song he felt sounded the best acoustically, Adams responded;

"Well, they all work acoustically, because they were all written on an acoustic guitar. This album started out as an acoustic record and halfway through I sort of switched gears and decided to make sort of an acoustic rock record. When I play the songs live, it has actually sort of led me into a path of this next tour, which is my first American acoustic tour. I feel confident enough with these songs and with the songs in the past that the show is going to be quite interesting, sort of hearing these songs stripped down completely, just myself and a guitar."

What is interesting is this was to be the beginning of Adams's Bare Bones tour, which toured the world in between his usually band shows for several years.

== Track listing ==
Original CD
No.	Title	Writer(s)	Length
1.	"Tonight We Have the Stars"	Bryan Adams, Jim Vallance, Gretchen Peters	4:05
2.	"I Thought I'd Seen Everything"	Adams, Eliot Kennedy, Robert John "Mutt" Lange	5:07
3.	"I Ain't Losin' the Fight"	Adams, Kennedy, Lange	3:56
4.	"Oxygen"	Adams, Kennedy, Lange	3:35
5.	"We Found What We Were Looking For"	Adams, Lange, Trevor Rabin	3:38
6.	"Broken Wings"	Adams, Kennedy	3:37
7.	"Somethin' to Believe In"	Adams, Kennedy	4:01
8.	"Mysterious Ways"	Adams, Peters	4:28
9.	"She's Got a Way"	Adams, Kennedy	4:41
10.	"Flower Grown Wild"	Adams, Vallance, Peters	3:53
11.	"Walk on By"	Adams, Vallance	2:53

Deluxe edition bonus tracks
No.	Title	Writer(s)	Length
12.	"The Way of the World" (originally a UK/Japan bonus track/B-side of lead single)	Adams, Vallance, Peters	3:18
13.	"Saved"	Adams, Peters	4:08
14.	"Miss America" (originally an iTunes bonus track/B-side of lead single)	Adams, Kennedy	3:57
15.	"She's Got a Way" (Chicane remix)	Adams, Kennedy	3:36

== Personnel ==
Personnel taken from 11 liner notes.

- Bryan Adams – vocals, acoustic guitar; electric guitar (track 1, 8), bass (tracks 1–3), production
- Keith Scott – guitar (tracks 2–5, 9, 12–14), slide guitar (track 7)
- Colin Cripps – guitar (tracks 1, 4, 7, 10), slide guitar (tracks 2, 3, 5, 6, 9, 11), backing vocals (track 7)
- Gary Breit – Hammond organ (tracks 1–3, 5, 7, 9, 10), piano (tracks 1–3, 5, 8–10, 12, 14)
- Eliot Kennedy – bass (tracks 4, 6, 9, 10, 12, 14), piano (tracks 6, 12), backing vocals (tracks 7, 13)
- Norm Fisher – bass (tracks 7, 8, 13)
- Robert John "Mutt" Lange – bass (track 5), production (tracks 1, 5)
- Mickey Curry – drums (tracks 1, 6–8, 13)
- Pat Steward – drums (tracks 2–5, 9, 12, 14), tambourine (track 14)
- Jim Vallance – drums (track 10)
- Máire Breatnach – fiddle (track 8), viola (track 11)

=== Additional personnel ===
- Pointless Brothers – backing vocals (track 6)
- Kathleen Edwards – backing vocals (track 7)
- Teese Gohl – string arrangement (tracks 7, 8)
- Gavin Greenway – string arrangement (track 11)
- Hal Beckett – string conductor (tracks 7, 8, 11)
- Bob Clearmountain – mixing
- Olle Romo – editing
- Ben Dobie – recording
- Bryan Gallant – additional recording
- Kirk Mcnally – additional recording
- Roger Monk – string recording (track 8)
- Chicane – remixer for track 15
- J. Hockley – additional production and recording for track 15

== Charts ==
=== Weekly charts ===
Chart (2008)	Peak position
Australian Albums (ARIA)	35
Austrian Albums (Ö3 Austria)	2
Belgian Albums (Ultratop Flanders)	2
Belgian Albums (Ultratop Wallonia)	35
Canadian Albums (Billboard)	1
Danish Albums (Hitlisten)	2
Dutch Albums (Album Top 100)	8
Finnish Albums (Suomen virallinen lista)	21
French Albums (SNEP)	157
German Albums (Offizielle Top 100)	2
Hungarian Albums (MAHASZ)	12
Irish Albums (IRMA)	25
Italian Albums (FIMI)	50
Norwegian Albums (VG-lista)	39
Portuguese Albums (AFP)	4
Scottish Albums (OCC)	6
Spanish Albums (Promusicae)	12
Swedish Albums (Sverigetopplistan)	30
Swiss Albums (Schweizer Hitparade)	1
Taiwanese Albums (Five Music)	13
UK Albums (OCC)	6
US Billboard 200	80
US Independent Albums (Billboard)	7
US Top Rock Albums (Billboard)	24

=== Year-end charts ===
Chart (2008)	Position
Belgian Albums (Ultratop Flanders)	76
German Albums (Offizielle Top 100)	89
Swiss Albums (Schweizer Hitparade)	42

== Certifications ==
Region	Certification	Certified units/sales
Denmark (IFPI Danmark)	Gold	15,000^{^}
Switzerland (IFPI Switzerland)	Gold	15,000^{^}
United Kingdom (BPI)	Silver	60,000^{^}
^{^} Shipments figures based on certification alone.
