= Ultimate (Bryan Adams album) =

Compilation album by Bryan Adams
- Released: 3 November 2017
- Recorded: 1980–2017
- Genres: Rock; soft rock
- Length: 79:54
- Label: Polydor
- Producers: Bryan Adams; Robert John "Mutt" Lange; Bob Clearmountain; Chris Thomas; Bob Rock; David Nicholas; Jimmy Jam and Terry Lewis; Jeff Lynne

Bryan Adams chronology
Get Up (2015)	Ultimate (2017)	Shine a Light (2019)

Singles from Ultimate
- 1. "Please Stay" Released: 13 October 2017

Ultimate is a compilation album by the Canadian singer-songwriter Bryan Adams, released on 3 November 2017, which contains songs he recorded from 1983 through 2017. The album also contains two new songs, "Ultimate Love" and "Please Stay" and was promoted with a tour.

== Track listing ==
No.	Title	Writer(s)	Length
1.	"Go Down Rockin'"	Bryan Adams, Jim Vallance	2:57
2.	"Can't Stop This Thing We Started"	Adams, Robert John "Mutt" Lange	3:15
3.	"Run to You"	Adams, Vallance	3:53
4.	"Ultimate Love" (newly recorded)	Adams, Vallance	3:32
5.	"Heaven"	Adams, Vallance	4:04
6.	"It's Only Love" (with Tina Turner)	Adams, Vallance	3:17
7.	"Here I Am"	Adams, Edward Elgar, Hans Zimmer, Gretchen Peters	3:34
8.	"When You're Gone" (featuring Melanie C)	Adams, Eliot Kennedy	3:26
9.	"Cloud Number Nine" (Chicane mix)	Adams, Max Martin, Peters	4:13
10.	"(Everything I Do) I Do It for You" (single edit)	Adams, Lange, Michael Kamen	4:10
11.	"You Belong to Me"	Adams, Vallance	2:30
12.	"Summer of '69"	Adams, Vallance	3:37
13.	"Have You Ever Really Loved a Woman?"	Adams, Kamen, Lange	4:53
14.	"Somebody"	Adams, Vallance	4:43
15.	"Please Forgive Me" (single re-mix)	Adams, Lange	4:32
16.	"Cuts Like a Knife"	Adams, Vallance	4:07
17.	"The Only Thing That Looks Good on Me Is You"	Adams, Lange	3:31
18.	"All for Love" (featuring Sting and Rod Stewart)	Adams, Lange, Kamen	4:43
19.	"Back to You" (MTV Unplugged)	Adams, Kennedy	4:42
20.	"Please Stay" (newly recorded)	Adams, Vallance	2:36
21.	"18 til I Die"	Adams, Lange	3:29
Total length:			79:54

== Charts ==
Chart (2017–19)	Peak position
Australian Albums (ARIA)	82
Belgian Albums (Ultratop Flanders)	48
Belgian Albums (Ultratop Wallonia)	171
Canadian Albums (Billboard)	80
Czech Albums (ČNS IFPI)	27
Irish Albums (IRMA)	31
New Zealand Albums (RMNZ)	21
Polish Albums (ZPAV)	3
Portuguese Albums (AFP)	25
Scottish Albums (Official Charts)	9
Spanish Albums (PROMUSICAE)	70
Swiss Albums (Schweizer Hitparade)	52
UK Albums (Official Charts)	11

Chart (2025)	Peak position
Greek Albums (IFPI)	37

== Certifications ==
Region	Certification	Certified units/sales
United Kingdom (BPI)	Gold	100,000^{‡}
^{‡} Sales+streaming figures based on certification alone.
