= Shine a Light (Bryan Adams album) =

Studio album by Bryan Adams
- Released: March 1, 2019
- Genre: Rock
- Length: 35:50
- Label: Polydor
- Producers: Bryan Adams; Johan Carlsson; Bob Rock; Phil Thornalley; Jim Vallance

Bryan Adams chronology
Ultimate (2017)	Shine a Light (2019)	Christmas (2019)

Singles from Shine a Light
- 1. "Shine a Light" Released: January 17, 2019; 2. "That's How Strong Our Love Is" Released: February 15, 2019

Shine a Light is the fourteenth studio album by Canadian singer-songwriter Bryan Adams, released on March 1, 2019, by Polydor Records. The album's title track, co-written by Ed Sheeran, was released on January 17, 2019. The album debuted at number one on the Canadian Albums Chart and won the Juno Award for "Best Adult Contemporary Album" in 2020.

== Track listing ==
No.	Title	Writer(s)	Producer(s)	Length
1.	"Shine a Light"	Bryan Adams; Ed Sheeran	Bryan Adams	3:25
2.	"That's How Strong Our Love Is" (featuring Jennifer Lopez)	Adams; Jim Vallance	Adams; Johan Carlsson	3:32
3.	"Part Friday Night, Part Sunday Morning"	Adams; Gretchen Peters	Adams; Bob Rock	3:13
4.	"Driving Under the Influence of Love"	Adams; Vallance	Adams; Rock	2:38
5.	"All or Nothing"	Adams; Eliot Kennedy	Adams; Rock	2:58
6.	"No Time for Love"	Adams; Peters	Adams; Rock	2:03
7.	"I Could Get Used to This"	Adams; Vallance	Adams; Vallance	1:48
8.	"Talk to Me"	Adams; Phil Thornalley	Adams; Rock	3:05
9.	"The Last Night on Earth"	Adams; Thornalley	Adams; Thornalley	3:06
10.	"Nobody's Girl"	Adams; Vallance	Adams; Rock	2:44
11.	"Don't Look Back"	Adams; Vallance	Adams; Rock	3:28
12.	"Whiskey in the Jar"	Traditional; arranged by Adams	Adams	3:45
Total length:				35:50

Japan bonus track
No.	Title	Writer(s)	Producer(s)	Length
13.	"I Hear You Knockin'"	Dave Bartholomew; Pearl King	Adams; Rock	3:55
Total length:				39:51

== Personnel ==
- Bryan Adams – vocals; guitars (1–3, 9), acoustic guitar (1, 11, 12), bass (1, 3, 7), keyboards (1), percussion (1), harmonica (12)
- Mickey Currey – drums (1, 3)
- Johan Carlsson – sub-bass (1), programming (2), piano (2), bass (2), guitar (2)
- Jamie Edwards – piano (2, 5, 6, 10), keyboards (3, 8, 10)
- Jennifer Lopez – vocals (2)
- Mattias Johansson – violin (2)
- David Bukovinszky – cello (2)
- Nils-Petter Ankarblom – string arrangement (2)
- Mattias Bylund – string synthesizer and string arrangement (2)
- Keith Scott – guitar (3–6, 8, 10, 11)
- Gary Breit – piano (3, 4, 11), organ (3)
- Josh Freese – drums (4, 6, 10)
- Paul Bushnell – bass (4–6, 8, 10, 11)
- Lyle Workman – guitar (4, 6, 10)
- Jim Vallance – organ (4), tambourine (4, 7, 11), guitar (7, 10), backing vocals (7, 10, 11)
- Abe Laboriel Jr. – drums (5, 8, 11)
- Rusty Anderson – guitar (5, 8, 11)
- Pat Steward – drums (7)
- Phil Thornalley – slide guitar (8), guitar (9), bass (9), keyboards (9)
- Tom Meadows – drums (9)

Additional personnel

- Bryan Adams – production (all except 2)
- Johan Carlsson – production (2)
- Bob Rock – production (3–6, 8, 10, 11)
- Jim Vallance – production (7)
- Phil Thornalley – production (9)

== Charts ==
=== Weekly charts ===
Chart (2019)	Peak position
Australian Albums (ARIA)	7
Austrian Albums (Ö3 Austria)	2
Belgian Albums (Ultratop Flanders)	10
Belgian Albums (Ultratop Wallonia)	43
Canadian Albums (Billboard)	1
Czech Albums (ČNS IFPI)	32
Dutch Albums (Album Top 100)	37
French Albums (SNEP)	147
German Albums (Offizielle Top 100)	3
Irish Albums (IRMA)	50
New Zealand Albums (RMNZ)	2
Polish Albums (ZPAV)	47
Portuguese Albums (AFP)	13
Scottish Albums (Official Charts)	2
Spanish Albums (Promusicae)	16
Swiss Albums (Schweizer Hitparade)	2
UK Albums (Official Charts)	2

=== Year-end charts ===
Chart (2019)	Position
Canadian Albums (Billboard)	48

== Certifications ==
Region	Certification	Certified units/sales
Canada (Music Canada)	Gold	40,000^{‡}
^{‡} Sales+streaming figures based on certification alone.
