= Ultimate Tour (Bryan Adams) =

2018–19 concert tour by Bryan Adams

- Tour by Bryan Adams
- Associated album: Ultimate
- Start date: 2 January 2018
- End date: 29 November 2018
- Legs: 7
- No. of shows: 8 in Oceania; 31 in Europe; 18 in North America; 5 in Asia; 54 in total

Bryan Adams concert chronology
- Get Up Tour (2016–2017); The Ultimate Tour (2018–2019); Shine a Light Tour (2019–2021)

The Ultimate Tour was the nineteenth concert tour by Canadian singer Bryan Adams in support of his sixth compilation album, Ultimate. The tour began in Matakana, New Zealand on 2 January 2018, and concluded in Ostrava, Czech Republic on 29 November 2018.

== Background ==
On 3 November 2017, Adams released his sixth compilation album, titled Ultimate. On 13 October 2017, Adams announced the European dates, followed by the Oceania tour dates on 31 October 2017.

== Set list ==
1. "One Night Love Affair"
2. "Can't Stop This Thing We Started"
3. "Run to You"
4. "Go Down Rockin'"
5. "Heaven"
6. "This Time"
7. "It's Only Love"
8. "Please Stay"
9. "Cloud Number Nine"
10. "You Belong to Me"
11. "Summer of '69"
12. "Here I Am"
13. "When You're Gone"
14. "(Everything I Do) I Do It for You"
15. "Back to You"
16. "Somebody"
17. "Have You Ever Really Loved a Woman?"
18. "Brand New Day"
19. "18 til I Die"
20. "I'm Ready"
21. "The Only Thing That Looks Good on Me Is You"
22. "Cuts Like a Knife"

Encore

23. "Ultimate Love"
24. "I Fought the Law"
25. "Straight from the Heart"
26. "All for Love"

== Tour dates ==
List of concerts, showing date, city, country, venue, opening act, tickets sold, number of available tickets and amount of gross revenue
Date	City	Country	Venue	Opening acts	Attendance	Revenue
Oceania
2 January 2018	Matakana	New Zealand	Matakana Country Park	Jordan Luck Band, Dave Dobbyn	—	—
4 January 2018	New Plymouth	New Zealand	TSB Bowl of Brooklands	Jordan Luck Band, Dave Dobbyn	—	—
6 January 2018	Hawke's Bay	New Zealand	Black Barn Vineyard	Jordan Luck Band, Dave Dobbyn	—	—
7 January 2018	Mount Maunganui	New Zealand	ASB Baypark Stadium	Jordan Luck Band, Dave Dobbyn	—	—
9 January 2018	Bribie Island	Australia	Sandstone Point Hotel	Thirsty Merc	—	—
10 January 2018	Gold Coast	Australia	GCCEC Arena	Thirsty Merc	—	—
12 January 2018	Geelong	Australia	Mt Duneed Estate	Daryl Braithwaite; Thirsty Merc	—	—
13 January 2018	Nagambie	Australia	Mitchelton Wines	Daryl Braithwaite; Thirsty Merc	—	—
Europe
27 April 2018	Malmö	Sweden	Malmö Arena	N/A	—	—
28 April 2018	Gothenburg	Sweden	Partille Arena	N/A	—	—
29 April 2018	Stockholm	Sweden	Ericsson Globe	N/A	—	—
1 May 2018	Helsinki	Finland	Helsinki Ice Hall	N/A	—	—
2 May 2018	Tallinn	Estonia	Saku Suurhall	N/A	—	—
3 May 2018	Riga	Latvia	Arena Riga	N/A	—	—
4 May 2018	Kaunas	Lithuania	Žalgiris Arena	N/A	—	—
5 May 2018	Warsaw	Poland	Torwar Hall	N/A	—	—
21 May 2018	Dublin	Ireland	3Arena	N/A	—	—
22 May 2018	Dublin	Ireland	3Arena	N/A	—	—
24 May 2018	Manchester	England	Manchester Arena	N/A	—	—
25 May 2018	Birmingham	England	Genting Arena	N/A	—	—
26 May 2018	Glasgow	Scotland	SSE Hydro	N/A	—	—
27 May 2018	Leeds	England	First Direct Arena	N/A	—	—
29 May 2018	Newcastle	England	Metro Radio Arena	N/A	—	—
30 May 2018	London	England	Wembley Arena	N/A	—	—
31 May 2018	London	England	The O_{2} Arena	N/A	—	—
North America
5 June 2018	Victoria	Canada	Save-On-Foods Memorial Centre	N/A	—	—
6 June 2018	Vancouver	Canada	Rogers Arena	N/A	13,031 / 13,031	$819,967
8 June 2018	Edmonton	Canada	Rogers Place	N/A	—	—
9 June 2018	Calgary	Canada	Scotiabank Saddledome	N/A	—	—
10 June 2018	Kelowna	Canada	Prospera Place	N/A	—	—
12 June 2018	Morrison	United States	Red Rocks Amphitheatre	N/A	—	—
Europe
17 June 2018	Amsterdam	Netherlands	Ziggo Dome	N/A	—	—
18 June 2018	Hamburg	Germany	Barclaycard Arena	N/A	—	—
19 June 2018	Mannheim	Germany	SAP Arena	N/A	—	—
20 June 2018	Zürich	Switzerland	Hallenstadion	N/A	—	—
22 June 2018	Cologne	Germany	Lanxess Arena	N/A	—	—
23 June 2018	Brussels	Belgium	Palais 12	N/A	—	—
24 June 2018	Esch-sur-Alzette	Luxembourg	Rockhal	N/A	—	—
North America
29 June 2018	Highland Park	United States	Ravinia Pavilion	—	—	—
1 July 2018	Timmins	Canada	Hollinger Park	—	—	—
3 July 2018	Windsor	Canada	The Colosseum at Caesars Windsor	—	—	—
4 July 2018	Orillia	Canada	Casino Rama Entertainment Centre	—	—	—
5 July 2018	Ottawa	Canada	LeBreton Flats	—	—	—
27 July 2018	St. Johns	Canada	Mile One Centre	—	—	—
28 July 2018	St. Johns	Canada	Mile One Centre	—	—	—
30 July 2018	Sydney	Canada	Centre 200	—	—	—
31 July 2018	Summerside	Canada	Consolidated Credit Union Place	—	—	—
2 August 2018	Lévis	Canada	Parc Champigny	—	—	—
3 August 2018	Toronto	Canada	Scotiabank Arena	—	—	—
5 August 2018	Wolf Trap	United States	Filene Center	—	—	—
Asia
9 October 2018	Ahmedabad	India	Sardar Patel Stadium	Rushil Ranjan; Abi Sampa	—	—
11 October 2018	Hyderabad	India	Hitex Exhibition Centre	Threeory Band	—	—
12 October 2018	Mumbai	India	JioGarden	Harshdeep Kaur	—	—
13 October 2018	Bangalore	India	Ozone Urbana	Aditi Singh Sharma	—	—
14 October 2018	New Delhi	India	Leisure Valley Park	Harshdeep Kaur	—	—
Europe
22 November 2018	Ljubljana	Slovenia	Arena Stožice	—	—	—
23 November 2018	Padua	Italy	Gran Teatro Geox	—	—	—
24 November 2018	Montichiari	Italy	PalaGeorge	—	—	—
25 November 2018	Salzburg	Austria	Salzburgarena	—	—	—
27 November 2018	Nuremberg	Germany	Arena Nuremberg	—	—	—
28 November 2018	Leipzig	Germany	Arena Leipzig	—	—	—
29 November 2018	Ostrava	Czech Republic	Ostravar Aréna	—	—	—
