= Hits on Fire =

Compilation album by Bryan Adams
- Released: 1988
- Genre: Rock
- Length: 44:53 (CD 1)
- Label: A&M
- Producer: Bryan Adams; Bob Clearmountain

Bryan Adams chronology
Into the Fire (1987)	Hits on Fire (1988)	Live! Live! Live! (1988)

Singles from Hits on Fire
- 1. "Diana" Released: 1985

Hits on Fire is a compilation album by Canadian rock singer Bryan Adams, released exclusively for Japan in 1988. Disc 1 is actually from Adams' 1987 album Into the Fire, released on March 30, 1987, through A&M Records.

Disc 2 features hit singles from the albums Cuts Like a Knife and Reckless, with the addition of three songs from 12" singles issued in 1985. These were not issued on CD outside Japan.

== Track listing ==
CD 1:

No.	Title	Writer(s)	Length
1.	"Heat of the Night"	Adams, Vallance	5:07
2.	"Into the Fire"	Adams, Vallance	4:41
3.	"Victim of Love"	Adams, Vallance	4:06
4.	"Another Day"	Adams, Vallance	3:41
5.	"Native Son"	Adams, Vallance	6:04
6.	"Only the Strong Survive"	Adams, Vallance	3:45
7.	"Rebel"	Adams, Vallance	4:02
8.	"Remembrance Day"	Adams, Vallance	5:59
9.	"Hearts on Fire"	Adams, Vallance	3:30
10.	"Home Again"	Adams, Vallance	4:18

CD 2:

No.	Title	Writer(s)	Length
1.	"Summer of '69"	Adams, Vallance
2.	"It's Only Love (with Tina Turner)"	Adams, Vallance
3.	"Straight from the Heart"	Adams, Kagna
4.	"Somebody"	Adams, Vallance
5.	"Heaven"	Adams, Vallance
6.	"This Time"	Adams, Vallance
7.	"Diana"	Adams, Vallance
8.	"Run to You"	Adams, Vallance
9.	"Cuts Like a Knife"	Adams, Vallance
10.	"Kids Wanna Rock (Live)"	Adams, Vallance
11.	"Heaven (Live)"	Adams, Vallance
12.	"One Night Love Affair"	Adams, Vallance

== Personnel ==
- Bryan Adams - guitar, piano, keyboards, vocals
- Keith Scott - lead guitar, backing vocals
- Mickey Curry - drums
- Dave Taylor - bass
- Tommy Mandel - organ, keyboards
- Robbie King - organ
- Jim Vallance - piano, percussion, sequencer
- Dave Pickell - piano
- Ian Stanley - keyboards
