= Live at Slane Castle, Ireland =

2001 concert video by Bryan Adams

Video by Bryan Adams
- Released: 11 December 2001
- Recorded: 26 August 2000
- Venue: Slane Castle (Slane, Ireland)
- Genre: Rock
- Length: 120 minutes
- Label: A&M Records
- Director: Hamish Hamilton
- Producer: Jim Parsons

Bryan Adams chronology
The Best of Me (1999)	Live at Slane Castle, Ireland (2001)	Spirit: Stallion of the Cimarron (2002)

Live at Slane Castle, Ireland is a concert film by Canadian rocker Bryan Adams. It was filmed on 26 August 2000 at Slane Castle in County Meath, Ireland.

The video recorded during the Slane Festival in which Bryan Adams is the headliner. During the day they performed as opening artists: Macy Gray, Muse, Eagle-Eye Cherry, Dara, Screaming Orphans, Melanie C and Moby.

The show, despite uncertain weather forecasts, was for a mixture of sun and showers, had 65,000 fans in attendance.

== Track listing ==
1. "Back to You" (Adams, Kennedy)
2. "18 til I Die (Adams, Lange)
3. "Can't Stop This Thing We Started" (Adams, Lange)
4. "Summer of '69" (Adams, Vallance)
5. "It's Only Love" (Adams, Vallance)
6. "(Everything I Do) I Do It for You" (Adams, Lange, Kamen)
7. "Cuts Like a Knife" (Adams, Vallance)
8. "When You're Gone" duet with Melanie C (Adams, Kennedy)
9. "She's Only Happy When She's Dancin'" (Adams, Vallance)
10. "I'm Ready" (Adams, Vallance)
11. "Heaven" (Adams, Vallance)
12. "Blues Jam" (If Ya Wanna Be Bad - Ya Gotta Be Good/Let's Make a Night to Remember) (Adams, Lange)
13. "The Only Thing That Looks Good on Me Is You" (Adams, Lange)
14. "Don't Give Up" (Adams, Chicane, Hedges)
15. "Cloud Number Nine" (Adams, Martin, Peters)
16. "Run to You" (Adams, Vallance)
17. "The Best of Me" (Adams, Lange)
18. "Please Forgive Me" (Adams, Lange)

=== Bonus tracks ===
1. "Have You Ever Really Loved a Woman?" (Adams, Lange, Kamen)
2. "Into The Fire" (Adams, Vallance)
3. "Before the Night Is Over" (Adams, Martin)

== Personnel ==
- Bryan Adams – bass, vocals
- Mickey Curry – drums, backing vocals
- Keith Scott – guitar, backing vocals
- Melanie C – vocals on "When You're Gone"
- Davy Spillane – low whistle on "I'm Ready" and "Heaven"
- Chicane – keyboards and DJ Mix in "Don't Give Up" and "Cloud Number Nine"

Technical personnel

- Hamish Hamilton – film director
- Jim Parsons – film producer
- Bob Clearmountain – engineer, mixed
- Büro Dirk Rodolph – artwork
- Mick Hutson – photography
- Bryan Adams – photography

== Certifications ==
Region	Certification	Certified units/sales
United Kingdom (BPI)	Gold	25,000^{*}
^{*} Sales figures based on certification alone.
