= On a Day Like Today =

On a Day Like Today may refer to:

== Music ==
- On a Day Like Today (album), a 1998 album by Bryan Adams, and the title song (see below)
  - "On a Day Like Today" (song), 1998
- "On a Day Like Today", a song by Lesley Gore from Lesley Gore discography 1967
- "On a Day Like Today", a song by Keane from Hopes and Fears 2004

== Other ==
- On a Day Like Today, the English name for the 2008 Egyptian film Zay El Naharda
