= The Best of Me (Bryan Adams album) =

Greatest hits album by Bryan Adams
- Released: November 15, 1999
- Recorded: 1984–1999
- Genre: Rock
- Length: 72:14
- Label: A&M
- Producers: Bryan Adams, Mutt Lange, Bob Clearmountain, Bob Rock, Chris Thomas, Patrick Leonard

Bryan Adams chronology
On a Day Like Today (1998)	The Best of Me (1999)	Spirit: Stallion of the Cimarron (2002)

Singles from The Best of Me
- 1. "The Best of Me" Released: November 1, 1999

Professional ratings
Review scores
Source	Rating
The Rolling Stone Album Guide	2.5/5 stars

The Best of Me is the second greatest hits album by Canadian singer Bryan Adams. It was released worldwide in 1999, and in the U.S. in 2000. It was his last release on A&M Records. Upon its initial release, a special edition 2-disc set was issued with live tracks. Another special edition 2-CD set was issued when the album was released in the U.S., dubbed 'Special Tour Edition', bearing three extra tracks. It is Adams' second compilation album, after So Far So Good; except for Japan, where Hits on Fire was released in 1988. The album contains songs from Reckless (1984) to On a Day Like Today (1998), omitting Into the Fire (1987). This album sees Adams reuniting with Robert John "Mutt" Lange – on the (new) title track – after being absent from 1998's On a Day Like Today.

== Track listing ==
No.	Title	Writer(s)	Album	Length
1.	"The Best of Me"	Bryan Adams, Robert John "Mutt" Lange	Previously unreleased	3:33
2.	"Can't Stop This Thing We Started"	Adams, Lange	Waking Up the Neighbours, 1991	4:29
3.	"I'm Ready"	Adams, Jim Vallance	MTV Unplugged, 1997	4:29
4.	"Summer of '69"	Adams, Vallance	Reckless, 1984	3:34
5.	"Let's Make a Night to Remember"	Adams, Lange	18 til I Die, 1996	6:19
6.	"All for Love" (with Rod Stewart and Sting)	Adams, Lange, Michael Kamen	The Three Musketeers, 1993	4:36
7.	"Have You Ever Really Loved a Woman?"	Adams, Lange, Kamen	18 til I Die and Don Juan DeMarco, 1995	4:48
8.	"Run to You"	Adams, Vallance	Reckless	3:54
9.	"Cloud Number Nine" (Chicane remix)	Adams, Max Martin, Gretchen Peters	Previously unreleased	4:11
10.	"(Everything I Do) I Do It for You"	Adams, Kamen, Lange	Waking Up the Neighbours and Robin Hood: Prince of Thieves, 1991	6:34
11.	"Back to You"	Adams, Eliot Kennedy	MTV Unplugged	4:30
12.	"When You're Gone" (featuring Melanie C)	Adams, Kennedy	On a Day Like Today, 1998	3:25
13.	"Please Forgive Me"	Adams, Lange	So Far So Good, 1993	5:58
14.	"The Only Thing That Looks Good on Me Is You"	Adams, Lange	18 til I Die	3:37
15.	"Inside Out"	Adams, Peters	On a Day Like Today	4:47
16.	"18 til I Die"	Adams, Lange	18 til I Die	3:30

1999 special edition bonus disc

1. "Summer of '69" (Live from South Africa) – 3:34
2. "Back to You" (Live from South Africa) – 5:28
3. "Can't Stop This Thing We Started" (Live from South Africa) – 5:12
4. "Have You Ever Really Loved a Woman?" (Live from South Africa) – 4:52
5. "Rock Steady" (Live from South Africa) – 5:23

Tracks 2, 5 are also available on the single "Inside Out", issued in 2000.

2002 special tour edition bonus disc

1. "Summer of '69" (Live from South Africa) – 3:34
2. "Back to You" (Live from South Africa) – 5:28
3. "Can't Stop This Thing We Started" (Live from South Africa) – 5:12
4. "Have You Ever Really Loved a Woman?" (Live from South Africa) – 4:52
5. "Rock Steady" (Live from South Africa) – 5:23
6. "Cloud Number Nine" (Live at Slane Castle) – 4:09
7. "I'm Ready" (Live at Slane Castle) – 4:34
8. "Cuts Like a Knife" (Live at Slane Castle) – 6:02

This is basically the same bonus disc as the 1999 special edition release, with three extra tracks added. Tracks 2, 5 are also available on the single "Inside Out", issued in 2000. Tracks 6, 7, 8 are from the DVD release Live at Slane Castle.

Alternate and iTunes edition

An alternate edition of this CD, dated 1999 and carrying a sticker bearing the catalogue number 490 522-2 [11], omits the final track listed above, "18 Til I Die", and instead adds a hidden track after track 15:

16. "Don't Give Up" – 3:42, by Chicane featuring Bryan Adams, written by Nick Bracegirdle, Bryan Adams, and Ray Hedges.

No bonus disc is included with this edition.

This version of the album was previously available to download on iTunes but has since been removed

== Personnel ==
- Bryan Adams – vocals, bass guitar, producer, arranger
- Robert John "Mutt" Lange – producer
- Phil Western – engineer
- Greg Goldman – engineer
- Zach Blackstone – engineer
- Bob Clearmountain – mixing, producer
- Phil Thornalley – guitar
- Patrick Leonard – producer, arranger
- Danny Cummings – drums, percussion
- Chris Thomas – producer
- David Nicholas – producer, mixing
- Jim Vallance – producer
- Bob Rock – producer
- Melanie C – vocals on "When You're Gone"
- Jody Perpick – recording engineer
- Mickey Curry – drums, background vocals
- Keith Scott – guitar, background vocals

== Charts ==
=== Weekly charts ===
Chart (1999–2000)	Peak position
Australian Albums (ARIA)	18
Austrian Albums (Ö3 Austria)	4
Belgian Albums (Ultratop Flanders)	3
Belgian Albums (Ultratop Wallonia)	30
Canadian Albums (RPM)	7
Dutch Albums (Album Top 100)	13
Estonian Albums (Eesti Top 10)	8
European Albums (Music & Media)	7
Finnish Albums (Suomen virallinen lista)	16
German Albums (Offizielle Top 100)	7
Irish Albums (IRMA)	18
Italian Albums (FIMI)	36
New Zealand Albums (RMNZ)	43
Norwegian Albums (VG-lista)	2
Scottish Albums (Official Charts)	23
Swedish Albums (Sverigetopplistan)	20
Swiss Albums (Schweizer Hitparade)	3
UK Albums (Official Charts)	12

=== Year-end charts ===
Chart (1999)	Position
Belgian Albums (Ultratop Flanders)	25
UK Albums (OCC)	44

Chart (2000)	Position
Australian Albums (ARIA)	95
Austrian Albums (Ö3 Austria)	39
Belgian Albums (Ultratop Flanders)	49
Canadian Albums (Nielsen SoundScan)	104
German Albums (Offizielle Top 100)	73
UK Albums (OCC)	80

== Certifications ==
Region	Certification	Certified units/sales
Argentina (CAPIF)	Gold	30,000^{^}
Australia (ARIA)	Platinum	70,000^{^}
Austria (IFPI Austria)	Gold	25,000^{*}
Belgium (BRMA)	Platinum	50,000^{*}
Canada (Music Canada)	3× Platinum	300,000^{^}
Germany (BVMI)	Gold	150,000^{^}
New Zealand (RMNZ)	Platinum	15,000^{^}
Norway (IFPI Norway)	Gold	25,000^{*}
Spain (Promusicae)	Platinum	100,000^{^}
Sweden (GLF)	Gold	40,000^{^}
Switzerland (IFPI Switzerland)	Platinum	50,000^{^}
United Kingdom (BPI)	3× Platinum	1,022,003
Summaries
Europe (IFPI)	2× Platinum	2,000,000^{*}
^{*} Sales figures based on certification alone.^{^} Shipments figures based on certification alone.
