= Reckless (Bryan Adams album) =

Studio album by Bryan Adams
- Released: November 5, 1984
- Recorded: June 1983; March–August 1984
- Studios: Power Station (New York City); Little Mountain (Vancouver)
- Genres: Rock; arena rock; pop rock
- Length: 37:58
- Label: A&M
- Producers: Bob Clearmountain; Bryan Adams

Bryan Adams chronology
Cuts Like a Knife (1983)	Reckless (1984)	Into the Fire (1987)

Singles from Reckless
- 1. "Run to You" Released: October 18, 1984; 2. "Somebody" Released: January 1985; 3. "Heaven" Released: April 9, 1985; 4. "Summer of '69" Released: June 17, 1985; 5. "One Night Love Affair" Released: September 1985; 6. "It's Only Love" Released: October 25, 1985 (UK)

Reckless is the fourth studio album by Canadian singer-songwriter Bryan Adams, released by A&M Records on November 5, 1984, to coincide with Adams's 25th birthday. Like its predecessor, Cuts Like a Knife, the album was entirely produced by Adams and Bob Clearmountain.

Reckless was commercially successful, selling over 12 million copies worldwide and making it Adams's second-highest-selling studio album to date—behind his 1991 album Waking Up the Neighbours. It was also the first Canadian album to sell over one million copies in Canada, and it is certified 11-times platinum in the country. The album peaked at number one on the US Billboard 200. It also received positive reviews from critics, with contemporary notices praising its songwriting and sonic quality.

Six singles were released from the album: "Run to You", "Somebody", "Heaven", "Summer of '69", "One Night Love Affair", and "It's Only Love"; all six singles charted within the top 20 on the US Billboard Hot 100.

== Development ==
"Heaven" was the first song recorded for the album, originally written by Adams and Jim Vallance for the film A Night in Heaven. Because the song had already been released on the film's soundtrack album, it was not initially planned for inclusion on Reckless, as it was considered too "light" for the album.

Adams and Vallance continued to write and record songs for the album throughout 1983 and 1984, and recording sessions began in March 1984 at Little Mountain Sound Studios in Vancouver. They worked with producer Bob Clearmountain, who had co-produced Adams's previous album, Cuts Like a Knife.

Nine tracks for the album were completed in August 1984, after Adams and Clearmountain flew to New York City to record vocal overdubs at Power Station. However, Adams was not fully satisfied with the album, and he consulted his manager, Bruce Allen, who listened to the material and asked him: "Where's the rock?". This prompted Adams and Vallance to return to Vancouver and re-record two songs, "One Night Love Affair" and "Summer of '69", and write "Kids Wanna Rock"; the album was completed later that month.

== Promotion ==
=== Singles ===
"Run to You" was released as the lead single from Reckless on October 18, 1984, in North America. The song was Adams's first number-one hit on the Billboard Top Rock Tracks chart, a position it held for four weeks; it also reached number six on the Billboard Hot 100. The song peaked at number four on the Canadian singles chart as well, becoming his highest-charting song in Canada at the time. "Run to You" also peaked at number eight in Ireland and reached number 11 on the UK Singles Chart; it was his second single to chart in Europe.

"Somebody" was issued as a single in January 1985. The song was Adams's second number-one hit on the Billboard Top Rock Tracks chart and reached number 11 on the Billboard Hot 100. "Somebody" remained in the top 20 on the Canadian singles chart for six weeks, becoming Adams's fourth top-20 hit on the Canadian chart. "Somebody" was released in Europe in February 1985, peaking at number 20 in Ireland and reaching number 35 on the UK Singles Chart; it was Adams's third single to chart in Europe.

"Heaven" was the third single issued from Reckless, reaching number one on the Billboard Hot 100 chart for two weeks in June 1985; the song had previously peaked at number nine on the Billboard Top Rock Tracks chart in February 1984, following its inclusion on the A Night in Heaven soundtrack.

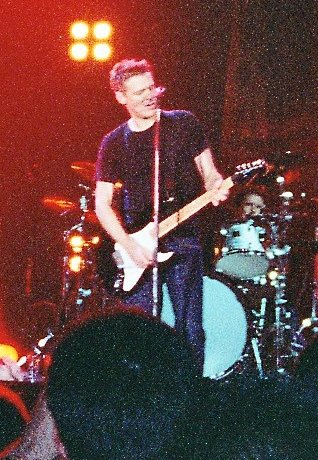
Adams performing "Summer of '69" in Dublin, Ireland.

Upon the release of Reckless in November 1984, "Summer of '69" received airplay on album-oriented rock radio stations, reaching number 40 on Billboard's Top Rock Tracks chart. After its release as a single in June 1985, "Summer of '69" peaked at number five on the Billboard Hot 100. "Summer of '69" has been certified four-times platinum in the UK.

"One Night Love Affair" was released as the album's fifth single in September 1985, peaking on the Billboard Hot 100 chart at number 13 and at number seven on the Top Rock Tracks chart. "One Night Love Affair" had been officially released to Canadian radio stations in February 1985. The song reached the top 20 on the Canadian Singles Chart.

"It's Only Love" was the sixth and final single from Reckless, released on October 21, 1985, in the UK. "It's Only Love" peaked at number 15 on the Billboard Hot 100 and number 29 on the UK Singles Chart.

=== 30th Anniversary edition ===
In June 2008, the original master tape recordings for Reckless were destroyed in a backlot fire at Universal Studios. Despite the loss of the original masters, a backup copy of the master tape of Reckless was discovered in Adams's home and served as the basis for the album's 30th anniversary remastered edition in 2014.

To commemorate the 30th anniversary of the album, an expanded 30th Anniversary edition was released on November 10, 2014; the first disc includes seven previously unreleased tracks, while disc two includes live concert audio from his 1985 tour, recorded at Hammersmith Odeon, London, on April 20, 1985, by BBC Radio 1. The Blu-ray audio release additionally includes a 5.1 surround mix; a Dolby Atmos mix was later made available on Apple Music. A tour, titled the Reckless 30th Anniversary Tour, took place from November 2014 to October 2015, consisting of 87 shows across North America and Europe.

== Reception ==
Professional ratings
Review scores
Source	Rating
AllMusic	4.5/5 stars
The Great Rock Discography	7/10
MusicHound Rock	3.5/5 stars
Rolling Stone	3/5 stars
The Rolling Stone Album Guide	3.5/5 stars
Encyclopedia of Popular Music	4/5 stars
The Village Voice	C−

Soon after its release, Reckless peaked at number six on the Billboard 200 in January 1985, before dropping out of the top 10. The success of the singles "Heaven" and "Summer of '69" in mid-1985 renewed interest in the album, and it began climbing back up the chart, eventually reaching number one in August 1985. Reckless also reached number one in Canada and New Zealand, and number two in Norway and Australia, while reaching the top 10 in the United Kingdom, Switzerland, and Sweden. In Canada, it entered the top 10 shortly after its release, peaking at number one in February 1985, and charted in the top 10 periodically throughout 1985–1986. Reckless has been certified 11-times platinum by Music Canada for 1,100,000 copies shipped in Canada, and was the first Canadian album to sell over one million copies in the country. It is also certified five-times platinum by the RIAA for 5,000,000 copies shipped in the US, and three-times platinum by the BPI for 900,000 copies shipped in the UK. As of 2014, 12 million copies of the album have been sold worldwide.

The album has received positive reviews from critics since its release, highlighting Clearmountain's production and Adams's songwriting. Ryan Healy of uDiscover Music described the album as a "stadium-sized classic" that showcased Adams's "working-class ethos" and "Springsteen-style knack for storytelling". Healy also noted that Adams and his longtime collaborator Jim Vallance "masterfully" tapped into the "pop/rock, radio-friendly vibe of the middle eighties". Classic Rock Review described it as a "particularly strong showcase for the layered guitars of Keith Scott", praised the "pristine sonic quality" of the album, and highlighted "Run to You" as having "just a tinge of surreal darkness". Dave Everley of Louder noted Reckless as "the one that turned [Adams] from upstart into champ", remarking that he "may not have invented arena rock, but he certainly perfected it". Everley also complimented Adams's ability to write "catchy, memorable hooks" and "sing with passion and conviction". In a less positive review, Christopher Connelly of Rolling Stone praised Adams's "born-to-rock" vocals and Clearmountain's production work, but expressed contempt at the songwriting in "Run to You" and "Kids Wanna Rock", with the latter being unfavorably compared to "It's Still Rock and Roll to Me" by Billy Joel.

The album won the 1985 Juno Award for Album of the Year. Kerrang! named Reckless its 1985 "Album of the Year", and No. 49 on its "100 Greatest Heavy Metal Albums of All Time" list in 1989. The album also appeared as No. 12 in the book The Top 100 Canadian Albums by Bob Mersereau. "It's Only Love" was nominated for a Grammy Award for Best Rock Vocal Performance by a Duo or Group, and won an MTV Video Music Award for Best Stage Performance in 1986.

== Track listing ==
All tracks are written by Bryan Adams and Jim Vallance, except where noted.

Side one
No.	Title	Length
1.	"One Night Love Affair"	4:32
2.	"She's Only Happy When She's Dancin'"	3:14
3.	"Run to You"	3:54
4.	"Heaven"	4:03
5.	"Somebody"	4:44

Side two
No.	Title	Length
6.	"Summer of '69"	3:36
7.	"Kids Wanna Rock"	2:36
8.	"It's Only Love" (with Tina Turner)	3:15
9.	"Long Gone"	3:57
10.	"Ain't Gonna Cry"	4:06
Total length:		37:58

30th Anniversary edition – disc one
No.	Title	Length
11.	"Let Me Down Easy"	3:40
12.	"Teacher, Teacher"	3:48
13.	"The Boys Night Out"	3:53
14.	"Draw the Line"	3:26
15.	"Play to Win"	3:28
16.	"Too Hot to Handle"	4:02
17.	"Reckless"	4:01
Total length:		64:11

30th Anniversary edition – disc two: Live in Hammersmith Odeon 1985
No.	Title	Writer(s)	Length
1.	"Remember"		4:32
2.	"The Only One"		4:39
3.	"It's Only Love"		3:50
4.	"Kids Wanna Rock"		3:16
5.	"Long Gone"		6:21
6.	"Cuts Like a Knife"		5:40
7.	"Lonely Nights"		3:55
8.	"Tonight"		6:13
9.	"This Time"		3:37
10.	"The Best Was Yet to Come"		2:43
11.	"Heaven"		4:04
12.	"Run to You"		4:30
13.	"Somebody"		4:20
14.	"Straight from the Heart"	Adams; Erik Kagna	3:17
15.	"Summer of '69"		4:40
Total length:			65:24

== Personnel ==
Personnel taken from Reckless liner notes.

- Bryan Adams – lead vocals; rhythm guitar (1–3, 5–10), backing vocals (2, 5, 10), lead guitar (5, 9), handclaps (2), piano (4), percussion (4), harmony vocals (6), gang vocals (7), harmonica (9)
- Keith Scott – lead guitar (1–3, 5–10), rhythm guitar (1–3, 5), backing vocals (2, 5, 10), handclaps (2), guitar (4), gang vocals (7)
- Tommy Mandel – keyboards (1–3, 5, 7–10)
- Dave Taylor – bass
- Pat Steward – drums (1, 6, 7), gang vocals (7)
- Jim Vallance – percussion (1–3, 5, 6)

Additional performers

- Mickey Curry – drums (2, 3, 5, 8–10)
- Robert Sabino – keyboards (4)
- Steve Smith – drums (4)
- Jody Perpick – handclaps (2), gang vocals (7)
- Lou Gramm – backing vocals (2)
- Gerry Berg – gang vocals (7)
- John Eddie – backing vocals (5)
- Bob Clearmountain – gang vocals (7)
- Tina Turner – lead vocals (8)

Production

- Bryan Adams – producer
- Bob Clearmountain – producer, engineer, mixing
- Jim Vallance – associate producer
- Mike Fraser – assistant engineer
- Michael Sauvage – assistant engineer
- Bruce Lampcov – assistant engineer
- Bob Ludwig – mastering
- Masterdisk (New York, NY) – mastering location
- Chuck Beeson – art direction, design
- Richard Frankel – art direction
- Hiro (51) – front cover photography
- Jim O'Mara – inner sleeve photography

== Charts ==
=== Weekly charts ===
1984–85 weekly chart positions for Reckless
Chart (1984–85)	Peak position
Australian Albums (Kent Music Report)	2
Canada Top Albums/CDs (RPM)	1
Dutch Albums (Album Top 100)	11
European Albums (Music & Media)	14
Finnish Albums (Suomen virallinen lista)	14
German Albums (Offizielle Top 100)	19
Italian Albums (Musica e dischi)	18
New Zealand Albums (RMNZ)	1
Norwegian Albums (VG-lista)	2
Swedish Albums (Sverigetopplistan)	5
Swiss Albums (Schweizer Hitparade)	10
UK Albums (Official Charts)	7
US Billboard 200	1

2025 weekly chart performance for Reckless
Chart (2025)	Peak position
Norwegian Rock Albums (IFPI Norge)	15

2026 weekly chart performance for Reckless
Chart (2026)	Peak position
German Rock & Metal Albums (Offizielle Top 100)	18

=== Year-end charts ===
Year-end chart positions for Reckless
Chart (1985)	Position
Australian Albums (Kent Music Report)	9
Canadian Albums (RPM)	4
Dutch Albums (Album Top 100)	84
German Albums (Offizielle Top 100)	19
New Zealand Albums (RMNZ)	9
Norwegian Summer Period (VG-lista)	8
US Billboard 200	2
US Top 100 Albums (Cash Box)	6

Chart (1986)	Position
US Billboard 200	66

Chart (1990)	Position
Dutch Albums (Album Top 100)	88

Chart (2024)	Position
Swedish Albums (Sverigetopplistan)	100

Chart (2025)	Position
Swedish Albums (Sverigetopplistan)	66

=== All-time chart ===
All-time chart positions for Reckless
Chart (1958–2018)	Position
US Billboard 200	169

== Certifications ==
Region	Certification	Certified units/sales
Australia (ARIA)	Platinum	70,000^{^}
Austria (IFPI Austria)	Gold	25,000^{*}
Canada (Music Canada)	Diamond	1,000,000^{^}
Denmark (IFPI Danmark)	Platinum	20,000^{‡}
Germany (BVMI)	Gold	250,000^{^}
Italy (FIMI)	Gold	25,000^{‡}
Netherlands (NVPI)	Platinum	100,000^{^}
New Zealand (RMNZ)	Platinum	15,000^{^}
Poland (ZPAV)	Platinum	60,000
Switzerland (IFPI Switzerland)	Platinum	50,000^{^}
United Kingdom (BPI)	3× Platinum	900,000^{^}
United States (RIAA)	5× Platinum	5,000,000^{^}
Summaries
Worldwide	—	12,000,000
^{*} Sales figures based on certification alone.^{^} Shipments figures based on certification alone.^{‡} Sales+streaming figures based on certification alone.

== See also ==
- List of diamond-certified albums in Canada
