= Summer of '69 =

1985 single by Bryan Adams

Single by Bryan Adams

from the album Reckless
- B-side: "The Best Was Yet to Come"; "Kids Wanna Rock (Live)"
- Released: May 27, 1985
- Recorded: March–April 1984
- Studio: Little Mountain Sound (Vancouver); Power Station (New York)
- Genre: Pop rock; heartland rock
- Length: 3:35
- Label: A&M
- Songwriters: Bryan Adams; Jim Vallance
- Producers: Bob Clearmountain; Adams

Bryan Adams singles chronology
"Heaven" (1985)	"Summer of '69" (1985)	"One Night Love Affair" (1985)

Music video
- "Summer of '69" on YouTube

"Summer of '69" is a song by Canadian singer-songwriter Bryan Adams from his fourth studio album, Reckless (1984). The song was written by Adams and his longtime collaborator Jim Vallance, and produced by Adams and Bob Clearmountain. "Summer of '69" is a pop rock and heartland rock track built around a prominent guitar riff. Lyrically, the song reflects on nostalgic summertime and youthful romance, drawing inspiration from cultural events of the 1960s as well as Adams' and Vallance's early experiences playing in bands.

A&M Records released "Summer of '69" on May 27, 1985, as the fourth single from Reckless. The song received favorable reviews from contemporary critics, who praised its high-energy production while drawing comparisons to Bruce Springsteen. Some critics questioned the authenticity of its nostalgic perspective. Commercially, "Summer of '69" peaked at number five on the US Billboard Hot 100 and reached the top ten in charts in Canada, Norway and New Zealand. It has since received multi-platinum certifications in the United Kingdom, Australia, and New Zealand.

The accompanying music video, directed by Steve Barron, features a narrative interweaving a colorized present-day setting with black-and-white flashbacks. The video received a nomination for Best Male Video at the 1986 MTV Video Music Awards. Regarded as one of the most successful songs of Adams' career, "Summer of '69" became a fixture of his live performances, including appearances at major events such as Live Aid and numerous concert tours. The song has been covered by other artists and is frequently cited by publications as one of the greatest Canadian songs or one of the best songs of all time. Official Charts named it the UK's biggest song to never reach the top 40.

== Background ==
Canadian singer-songwriter Bryan Adams began his musical career in the mid-1970s after joining the band Sweeney Todd. He subsequently released three solo albums: Bryan Adams (1980), You Want It You Got It (1981), and Cuts Like a Knife (1983). Of these, Cuts Like a Knife achieved commercial success, producing hit singles such as "Cuts Like a Knife" and "Straight from the Heart". Following a 13-month promotional tour for Cuts Like a Knife, Adams reunited with his longtime writing partner Jim Vallance in Vancouver to work on his fourth studio album, Reckless. "Summer of '69" was among the songs written and selected for the album. Adams released Reckless on November 5, 1984. The album sold over 250,000 copies in Canada and one million copies in the United States within six weeks of its debut. Before the release of "Summer of '69" as the album's fourth single, Adams had released three other singles: "Run to You", "Somebody", and "Heaven", the last of which became his first number-one song on the Billboard Hot 100.

== Writing and composition ==
"Summer of '69" was written in January 1984 in West Vancouver. Adams stated that it was the most difficult song to write and produce for Reckless, and it underwent more revisions than any other track on the album. Numerous demos failed to capture the desired sound; one version with entirely different lyrics was discarded, and the song was nearly excluded from the final tracklist. Initially, Vallance proposed the title "The Best Days of My Life". However, he and Adams felt "Summer of '69" was a better choice. The phrase appeared in early drafts because it rhymed with "five and dime". Adams found the title intriguing; although it suggests a specific timeframe, he asserted that the number was a metaphor for coming of age rather than a strictly personal timeline. Adams later revealed that the number 69 was also intended as a sexual double entendre.

Adams and Vallance challenged themselves to write a nostalgic song about childhood in Canada during the 1960s, akin to the way John Lennon and Paul McCartney reflected on Liverpool in "Penny Lane" (1967) or "Strawberry Fields Forever" (1967). The lyrics were influenced by major cultural events of 1969, such as the Apollo 11 moon landing, the breakup of the Beatles, and the Woodstock festival. In early drafts, the line "Jimmy quit and Jody got married" was "Chuck quit and Gordy got married" (or "Whitty quit"), based on Vallance's real-life friends. A lyrical concept about working at the rail yard was discarded because Adams feared it too closely resembled the style of Bruce Springsteen. The final composition of "Summer of '69" is an amalgamation of memories from both writers: Vallance's teenage band experiences in the late 1960s and Adams' garage band years in the early 1970s.

== Production and recording ==
Recording sessions for "Summer of '69" took place in March and April 1984 at Little Mountain Sound Studios in Vancouver, and were engineered by Bob Clearmountain. The track was mixed by Clearmountain in September 1984 at the Power Station in New York City. Clearmountain and Adams produced the track, with Vallance as associate producer. The lineup included Adams (rhythm guitar), Keith Scott (lead guitar), Dave Taylor (bass guitar), Pat Steward (drums), and Vallance (percussion). Adams and Vallance were responsible for the arrangement.

In a basement studio, "Summer of '69" was demoed in three or four different ways. An opening riff played on a twelve-string guitar, similar to the one in the breakdown, was replaced with one played on a six-string guitar in the final version. The thick, resonant guitar sound on the original recording was achieved through overdubbing, specifically by recording the same guitar part twice. During lyrical refinement, the recurrence of the phrase "best days of my life" was reduced from seven times to three, and the title phrase "summer of '69" was used five times. After extensive editing, Adams included "Summer of '69" on Reckless only when he felt the song had met his standards. Reflecting on the process, Vallance described "Summer of '69" as a track written for pure enjoyment that brought out the best in his collaboration with Adams.

== Music and lyrics ==
"Summer of '69" is a pop rock and heartland rock song. It in the key of [D major] It opens with a guitar line played over a D_{5} chord. The first verse continues with a progression of alternating D_{5}–A_{5} chords, shifting to D–A in subsequent verses. The guitar riffs are constructed around the D–A foundation, emphasizing the D chord. The pre-chorus follows a Bm–A–D–G chord progression repeated twice, concluding with Bm–A, while the bridge modulates to [F major] and an F–B♭–C–B♭ progression. According to Vallance, the twelve-string guitar part in the breakdown was a tribute to the style of 1960s bands such as the Beatles ("Ticket to Ride"), the Byrds ("Mr. Tambourine Man"), the Searchers ("Needles and Pins"), and We Five ("You Were on My Mind").

The introduction and first verse primarily use palm muting combined with downstrokes. To leave room for increased intensity in the later parts of the song, the guitarist initially plays only the lower two or three strings of the chord. The pre-chorus uses arpeggiation instead of strumming. The recording's guitar tone was achieved using a single-coil pickup and direct amplifier distortion without effects pedals, with slight reverberation. "Summer of '69" centers on memories of summer and youthful romance, which reflects Adams' personal, nostalgic world. Adams described the track as a response to one of his favorite songs, Bob Seger's "Night Moves" (1976).

Many details came from Adams' and Vallance's memories. In 1969, Adams began pursuing music, teaching himself to play instruments and forming a school band called Baker and Lawyer with dreams of becoming a rock star. The "real six-string" refers to a cherry-red sunburst 1960 Fender Stratocaster, one of Adams' first instruments. The character "Jimmy" stemmed from a former teacher's warning to Vallance that he could not "just drum his life away"; "Jody" refers to Jody Perpik, Adams' tour manager and sound engineer. The line "ain't no use in complainin' when you got a job to do" alludes to Adams' time working as a dishwasher in North Vancouver, and "standin' on your mama's porch" was inspired by memories of Vallance's first girlfriend and her brother, who mentored him in music.

== Release and commercial performance ==
According to Adams, music producer Jimmy Iovine advised him to exclude both "Summer of '69" and "Heaven" from Reckless, arguing they were unsuitable. Adams refused to alter the tracklist, as the recording had already been delivered to management. Following its debut on Reckless in early November 1984, the song received airplay on US radio stations. In a phone call with FMQB magazine, Al Cafaro, chairman of A&M Records, announced the release of "Summer of '69" as a single from Reckless in a 12-inch format on Memorial Day, May 27, 1985. In the United Kingdom, two single versions were released on August 2, 1985; both featured a live recording of "Kids Wanna Rock" from Live Aid as the B-side, while the 12-inch version added a mix of four Adams songs titled "Bryan Adamix".

In the United States, "Summer of '69" peaked at number five on the Billboard Hot 100 and number seven on the Cash Box Top 100 for the week of August 31, 1985. As of June 2016, the song had sold 1,606,647 units according to Nielsen SoundScan. In Canada, the track reached number 11 on the RPM chart. In Australia, it peaked at number 14 on the Kent Music Report and was certified 8× Platinum by the Australian Recording Industry Association (ARIA) as of 2022. It reached number seven on the New Zealand Singles Chart and was certified 8× Platinum by Recorded Music NZ. In the United Kingdom, the song peaked at number 42 on the UK Singles Chart. Adams later attributed the song's modest initial performance in the UK to BBC Radio 1's refusal to play any tracks from Reckless other than "Run to You". As of 2026, the British Phonographic Industry (BPI) had certified "Summer of '69" 6× Platinum.

In 1985, "Summer of '69" received a Citation of Achievement from Broadcast Music, Inc. (BMI) for US radio airplay. It won a ProCan Award from the Performing Rights Organization of Canada in 1986 for Canadian airplay. In 2000, the Society of Composers, Authors and Music Publishers of Canada (SOCAN) honored the song with a SOCAN Classic Award after it surpassed 100,000 radio plays in Canada.

== Critical reception ==
"Summer of '69" received generally favorable reviews from contemporary music critics. Many writers compared Adams' vocals and the song's arrangement to the work of Bruce Springsteen. (Note: Attributed to reviews by Evelyn Erskine for Ottawa Citizen, Jerry Smith for Music Week, Cash Box, and Mike Daly for The Age.) Frank Edmonds of the Bury Free Press, James Belsey of the Bristol Evening Post, and Dave Sholin of the Gavin Report all praised the song's high energy. Edmonds gave the track a 9/10, Belsey selected it as "single of the week" and described it as a "beefcake" rock 'n' roll track, and John Gorman of WMMS (Cleveland) called it a "masterpiece". Sholin remarked that Adams successfully recreated the nostalgic atmosphere of Woodstock, while Evelyn Erskine of the Ottawa Citizen assessed that Adams effectively embodied the rocker persona and naturally explored street-level themes.

In less favorable reviews, Mike Gardner of Record Mirror noted that while "Summer of '69" lacked stylistic innovation, Adams delivered the material with "convincing spirit". The Highland News acknowledged the song's catchy production but found the overall quality weak. Several critics felt that choosing "'69" as a symbol of youthful nostalgia lacked authenticity, noting that Adams would have been only nine years old at the time. (Note: Attributed to reviews by Chris Willman for Los Angeles Times, Wilfred Langmaid for The Daily Gleaner, Cheryl Wenner for The Morning Call, and Peter Edwards for Regina Leader-Post.) Writing for the Edmonton Journal, Helen Metella called "Summer of '69" a "low rent" version of "Hollywood Nights" (1978) without a "clever" chorus. Peter Anderson of the Torquay Herald Express dismissed the opening line about the six-string guitar as "clichéd". Both Ken Tucker of The Philadelphia Inquirer and Tom Matthews of the Kingsport Times-News criticized the song's concept of "moving reminiscence", arguing it "fails" due to a lack of vivid detail regarding the specific year Adams chose as his subject.

In retrospective reviews, Tom Breihan of Stereogum gave "Summer of '69" a 9/10, viewing it as a "totemic" single from Reckless. Tom Moon of Blender remarked that Adams could be likened to a "soldier in the three-chord army", while Dave Everley of Classic Rock called the song a "glorious hosanna" of pop rock.

== Music video ==
The music video for "Summer of '69" was directed by Steve Barron and produced by Simon Fields. It was released on December 1, 1984, on the Reckless home video album. The video debuted on MTV on June 9, 1985, and aired in Canada on MuchMusic during the week of June 21, 1985. It received a nomination for Best Male Video at the 1986 MTV Video Music Awards. Greg Burliuk of The Kingston Whig-Standard wrote that the video captured a "restless" energy that made Adams' song more "attractive". Lydia Kolb of The Paducah Sun found the video easy to follow and engaging, asserting it was one of Adams' "better conceptual" videos.

The music video intersperses a present-day setting with black-and-white flashbacks to 1969. In the past sequences, Adams is depicted living in a cramped trailer. He and his band have no space to play other than a dilapidated, cluttered garage surrounded by trash. Jody Perpik and his real-life wife appear in a car with a "Just Married" sign, corresponding to the lyric "Jimmy quit and Jody got married". Contrasting with the monochrome scenes is the full-color present day, where Adams lies relaxed in a hammock, recounting his life to a journalist taking notes. Adams is then shown displaying his mischievous side and working part-time jobs to make a living.

In the segment corresponding to the line "I knew that it was now or never", Adams turns his back on a female character and walks toward the camera, leaving her standing motionless. This action marks the moment Adams decides to leave the past behind and return to the present. In the following scene, Adams runs along train tracks in Gastown, Vancouver. He then catches a guitar out of mid-air and walks straight past a "No Admittance" sign to return to the garage of his youth where he once performed. Near the end of the video, a distant, blurred, and slightly shaky shot simulates the perspective of the female character watching the band through a car window. When her new boyfriend asks about the band performing, she feigns ignorance. The video ends with the couple appearing to argue, and their story continues in the music video for "Somebody".

== Live performance and usage ==
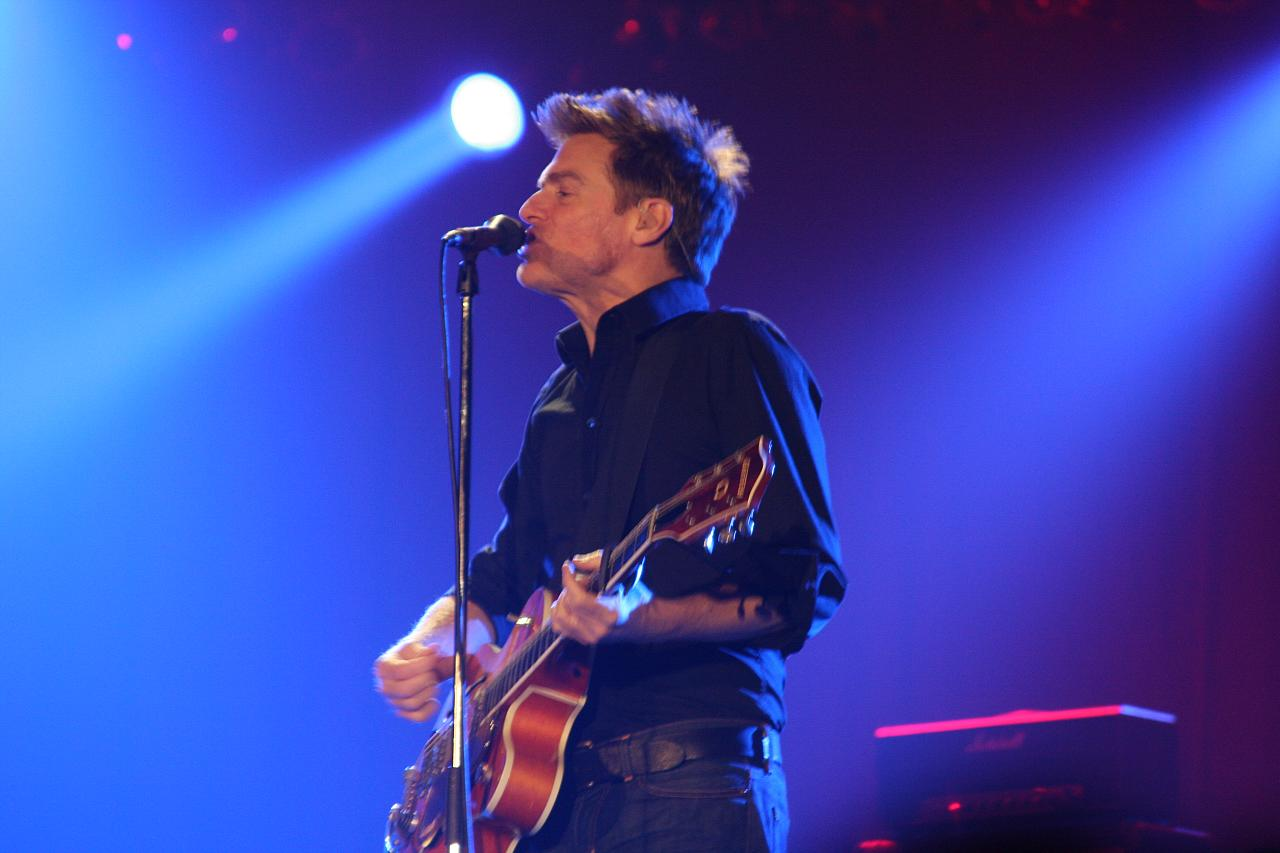
Bryan Adams during a performance in 2009. "Summer of '69" was featured on many of his tours after 1984.

Adams performed "Summer of '69" at the Live Aid fundraising concert on July 13, 1985. He selected the song as the opening number for his performance at the Expo 86 gala in Vancouver, an event attended by Prince Charles, Diana, Princess of Wales, and former Canadian Prime Minister John Turner. In June 1986, he played the song during Amnesty International's A Conspiracy of Hope tour. Adams has included the song on numerous headlining tours since 1984, including the Reckless Tour (1984–1985), Into the Fire Tour (1987–1988), Waking Up the World Tour (1991–1993), So Far So Good Tour (1993–1994), and The Best of Me Tour (1999–2001).

"Summer of '69" has been covered by various artists, such as Taylor Swift on her Speak Now World Tour (2011), Ryan Adams (2015), the Foo Fighters (2015), and Canadian rock band Nickelback at the Canadian Songwriters Hall of Fame (2022). Studio versions have been recorded by Bowling for Soup, Austrian musician DJ Ötzi, Jive Bunny and the Mastermixers, MxPx, and singer-songwriter Catherine Porter. The song was also included in the video game Lego Rock Band (2009).

== Legacy ==
"Summer of '69" has become one of Adams' most successful singles and is recognizable by its opening riff. Sorelle Saidman, author of an Adams biography, noted that the single's success helped Reckless reach number one on the Billboard 200 after 37 weeks on the chart. According to Neil Crossley of MusicRadar, "Summer of '69" is a "classic" song centered on a "gargantuan" sound and a "killer" chorus; it defined an era and became a "rite of passage" for generations of guitarists. He wrote that the song helped affirm Adams' status as a best-selling artist by conveying themes of youth and nostalgia.

"Summer of '69" appears on many of Adams' compilation and live albums. Due to a dispute over master recording ownership with Universal Music Group, Adams re-recorded the song with the suffix "Classic Version" and released it on the album Classic (2022). Chart Attack magazine included "Summer of '69" in its lists of the best Canadian works, ranking it 24th in 1996, 4th in 2000, and 5th in 2005. In 2014, CBC Radio named it the 12th-best Canadian song ever. Music journalist Chuck Eddy named it the 50th-best single of the 1980s. Blender ranked it 70th on its list of the "500 greatest songs since you were born", and music critic Dave Marsh ranked it 635th among the "1001 greatest singles ever made".

== Track listing and formats ==
- US 7" single
1. "Summer of '69" – 3:35
2. "The Best Was Yet to Come" – 3:04
- Germany maxi 12" single
1. "Summer of '69" – 3:35
2. "Straight from the Heart" – 3:30
3. "The Best Was Yet to Come" – 3:04
4. "The Bryan Adamix" – 5:52
- UK 7" single
1. "Summer of '69" – 3:35
2. "Kids Wanna Rock (Live)" – 3:14
- UK 12" single
1. "Summer of '69" – 3:35
2. "Kids Wanna Rock (Live)" – 3:14
3. "The Bryan Adamix" – 5:52

== Personnel ==
- Bryan Adams – lead and harmony vocals, rhythm guitar
- Keith Scott – lead guitar
- Tommy Mandel – keyboards
- Dave Taylor – bass
- Pat Steward – drums
- Jim Vallance – percussion

== Charts ==
=== Weekly charts ===
Chart (1985)	Peak position
Australia (Kent Music Report)	14
Austria (Ö3 Austria Top 40)	17
Canada Top Singles (RPM)	11
Europe (Hot 100 Singles)	99
Germany (GfK)	62
Ireland (IRMA)	18
New Zealand (Recorded Music NZ)	7
Norway (VG-lista)	9
Sweden (Sverigetopplistan)	13
UK Singles (Official Charts)	42
US Billboard Hot 100	5
US Mainstream Rock Airplay (Billboard)	40
US Cash Box Top 100	7
Uruguay (UPI)	3

Chart (1990)	Peak position
Belgium (Ultratop 50 Flanders)	8
Europe (Hot 100 Singles)	98
Netherlands (Dutch Top 40)	5
Netherlands (Single Top 100)	4

Chart (2006)	Peak position
UK Singles (OCC)	54

Chart (2007)	Peak position
UK Singles (OCC)	140

Chart (2008)	Peak position
UK Singles (OCC)	88

Chart (2021–2026)	Peak position
Canada Digital Song Sales (Billboard)	5
Finland Airplay (Radiosoittolista)	46
Global 200 (Billboard)	198
Netherlands Airplay (Dutch Charts)	46
US Digital Song Sales (Billboard)	9
US Hot Rock & Alternative Songs (Billboard)	11

=== Year-end charts ===
Chart (1985)	Position
Australia (Kent Music Report)	78
Canada Top Singles (RPM)	99
New Zealand (Recorded Music NZ)	48
US Cash Box Top 100	64
US Billboard Hot 100	74

Chart (1990)	Position
Belgium (Ultratop Flanders)	59
Netherlands (Dutch Top 40)	36
Netherlands (Single Top 100)	37

Chart (2023)	Position
UK Singles (OCC)	98

Chart (2024)	Position
UK Singles (OCC)	91

=== Decade-end charts ===
Chart (1980–1989)	Position
Canada (Canadian Artists Digital Songs)	1

== Certifications and sales ==
Region	Certification	Certified units/sales
Australia (ARIA)	8× Platinum	560,000^{‡}
Denmark (IFPI Danmark)	4× Platinum	360,000^{‡}
Germany (BVMI)	2× Platinum	1,200,000^{‡}
Italy (FIMI)	Platinum	100,000^{‡}
New Zealand (RMNZ)	8× Platinum	240,000^{‡}
United Kingdom (BPI)	6× Platinum	3,600,000^{‡}
United States	—	1,606,647
^{‡} Sales+streaming figures based on certification alone.
