= Diana (Bryan Adams song) =

Single by Bryan Adams
- Released: 1985
- Recorded: April 1984
- Genre: Rock
- Length: 3:48
- Label: A&M
- Songwriters: Jim Vallance; Bryan Adams
- Producers: Bob Clearmountain; Bryan Adams

Bryan Adams singles chronology
"It's Only Love" (1985)	"Diana" (1985)	"Christmas Time" (1985)

"Diana" is a song performed by Bryan Adams. Written by Adams and Jim Vallance, the track was released as the B-side to "Heaven" in some countries, and is one of the most prominent of Bryan Adams' non-album songs. It was released as a single in Portugal.

== Background ==
The song was written in March 1984 in Vancouver, British Columbia, Canada. It was intended as a light, comedic song about the wedding of Charles, Prince of Wales and Lady Diana Spencer. The song was not included on Adams' Reckless album because Adams was worried about offending the royal couple. Nevertheless, the song was later released as a B-side on the single "Heaven", and was also included on the 1988 compilation Hits on Fire, released in Japan.

== Lyrics ==
The lyrics of the song admire Diana, a celebrity who the narrator first saw in a magazine, then later on TV. The narrator professes his love for Diana, and indicates that her current husband (never mentioned by name) is not good enough for her. The narrator begs Diana to leave her husband, indicating that she would not have to be part of the "social scene" if she were with him.

Though the song is assumed to be about Diana and Prince Charles, the song never explicitly identifies the characters as such. Furthermore, it is never mentioned what Diana does (other than being a well-known celebrity), nor is Charles mentioned by name or title. A royal connection is made, though, in that Diana is identified by the narrator as "the queen of all my dreams".

== Media reaction ==
According to co-writer Jim Vallance, when the British press obtained a copy of the record, they "attempted to fabricate a scandal" by saying that Adams had inappropriate feelings for Diana and had insulted Prince Charles.

== Live performance ==
Adams is said to have had an affair with Diana while dating Cecilie Thomsen, but this was ten years after writing the song. Adams often performed the song during his live concerts up until the day of Diana's death after which he retired the song permanently.

== See also ==
- Reckless
- Diana, Princess of Wales
