= Christmas Time (Bryan Adams song) =

Single by Bryan Adams
- B-side: "Reggae Christmas"
- Released: Late 1985
- Recorded: 1984
- Genre: Pop rock; Christmas
- Length: 4:10 (original); 4:58 ("Classic" version)
- Label: A&M
- Songwriters: Bryan Adams; Jim Vallance
- Producers: Bob Clearmountain; Bryan Adams; Jim Vallance

Bryan Adams singles chronology
"Diana" (1985)	"Christmas Time" (1985)	"Heat of the Night" (1987)

Music video
- "Christmas Time (Classic Version)" on YouTube

"Christmas Time" is a song by Canadian rock singer-songwriter Bryan Adams. It was written by Adams and Jim Vallance and became Adams' most popular Christmas song. It was originally released on clear, green vinyl with a picture sleeve. It was written and recorded in Vancouver, British Columbia, Canada. No music video was shot for the song when it was originally released, but on December 10, 2019, Adams released a video for the song on YouTube. Over thirty years after it was first recorded, the song still receives significant radio airplay each year during the Christmas season. It features prominently in the 2022 action comedy film Violent Night.

The B-side is "Reggae Christmas", written by Jim Vallance in 1978 after a chance meeting with Ringo Starr. Although Starr never recorded it, Adams went on to do his version in 1984, adding a new bridge section. It was first released as a fanclub-only single on colored vinyl in December 1984, with a Christmas message by Adams and his band on the B-side (entitled "Plum Pudding"). Subsequently, "Reggae Christmas" ended up as the B-side to all pressings of "Christmas Time", from 1985 onwards. There was a live video made by MTV for its "Reggae Christmas", featuring a guest appearance by Pee-wee Herman.

== Track list ==
=== A-side ===
- "Christmas Time"

=== B-side ===
- "Reggae Christmas"

== Albums ==
Despite being listed as a bonus track to the 1983 album Cuts Like a Knife on the Bryan Adams website, there is no official version of the album with "Christmas Time" on it. The song, along with its B-side "Reggae Christmas", appears on Bryan Adams' 2019 EP Christmas but it has never been included on an Adams-only compilation.

The song is also available on these compilation albums:

- The Christmas Hit Collection (Arcade, 1989)
- The Best of Rock Christmas (Polystar, 1995)
- A Musical Christmas from The Vatican DVD (2002)
- The Very Best of Rock Christmas (Polystar, 2005)
- A Canadian Christmas (2005)
- Christmas #1 Hits (2006)
- Now Christmas 3 (Warner Music Canada, 2008)
- On Christmas Night (2016)

== Personnel ==
- Bryan Adams – acoustic guitar, lead and backing vocals
- Jim Vallance – bass guitar, keyboards, percussion, backing vocals
- Keith Scott – lead guitar
- Mickey Curry – drums

== Charts ==
Chart (1985–1986)	Peak position
Australia (Kent Music Report)	64
Canada Top Singles (RPM)	39
Germany (GfK)	67
Ireland (IRMA)	26
Netherlands (Single Top 100)	33
Norway (VG-lista)	2
Portugal (AFP)	3
Sweden (Sverigetopplistan)	19
Switzerland (Schweizer Hitparade)	18
UK Singles (The Official Charts Company)	55
US Mainstream Rock (Billboard)	31
Chart (2009)	Peak position
Sweden (Sverigetopplistan)	50
Switzerland (Schweizer Hitparade)	91
Chart (2016–2026)	Peak position
Austria (Ö3 Austria Top 40)	17
Canada Digital Song Sales (Billboard)	19
Estonia Airplay (TopHit)	28
Germany (GfK)	14
Global 200 (Billboard)	158
Poland Airplay (ZPAV)	18
Poland (Polish Streaming Top 100)	80
Slovakia Airplay (ČNS IFPI)	31

== Certifications ==
Region	Certification	Certified units/sales
Canada (Music Canada)	Platinum	100,000^{^}
Denmark (IFPI Danmark)	Gold	45,000^{‡}
Germany (BVMI)	Platinum	600,000^{‡}
Poland (ZPAV)	Gold	50,000
^{^} Shipments figures based on certification alone.^{‡} Sales+streaming figures based on certification alone.
