= I Don't Wanna Live Forever (disambiguation) =

"I Don't Wanna Live Forever" is a 2016 song by Zayn Malik and Taylor Swift.

I Don't Wanna Live Forever may also refer to:

- "I Don't Wanna Live Forever", a song by Bryan Adams from On a Day Like Today
- "I Don't Wanna Live Forever", a song by the Riverdales from Tarantula
