= Don't Leave Me Lonely =

Song by Bryan Adams

from the album Cuts Like a Knife
- Released: January 18, 1983
- Recorded: 1982
- Length: 2:58
- Label: A&M
- Songwriters: Bryan Adams; Jim Vallance; Eric Carr
- Producers: Bob Clearmountain and Bryan Adams

"Don't Leave Me Lonely" is a song by the Canadian musician Bryan Adams featured on his 1983 album Cuts Like a Knife.

Written by Adams, collaborator Jim Vallance and late Kiss drummer Eric Carr, the song's origin dates back to sometime in 1981 or 1982 when Adams was working with the band on material for their Killers album. Adams and Carr began working on the song, which Carr wrote the music and lyrics of the chorus before Adams relocated to Canada and finished the song with Vallance.

Carr made a demo of the song for possible inclusion on Kiss' 1982 album Creatures of the Night, but the song did not make it on the album as it did not fit in with the rest of the material. An instrumental version of Carr's recording was released on the 40th anniversary box set release of Creatures of the Night in November 2022.

== Personnel ==
- Bryan Adams – lead and backing vocals, guitars
- Keith Scott – guitars, guitar solo
- Tommy Mandel – Hammond B3 organ, synthesizers
- Dave Taylor – bass
- Mickey Curry – drums
- Lou Gramm – backing vocals
