= Cloud Number Nine =

1999 single by Bryan Adams

Single by Bryan Adams

from the album On a Day Like Today
- Released: May 3, 1999
- Genre: Soft rock
- Length: 3:46 (album version); 4:12 (remix)
- Label: A&M; Mercury
- Songwriters: Bryan Adams; Max Martin; Gretchen Peters
- Producers: Bryan Adams; Bob Rock

Bryan Adams singles chronology
"When You're Gone" (1998)	"Cloud Number Nine" (1999)	"The Best of Me" (1999)

"Cloud Number Nine" (sometimes spelled as "Cloud #9" or "Cloud Number 9") is a song by Canadian singer-songwriter Bryan Adams. It was released on May 3, 1999, as the third single from his eighth studio album, On a Day Like Today (1998). The single version is notable for being one of the few remixes Bryan Adams released with British musician Chicane. "Cloud Number Nine" reached number six on the UK Singles Chart, number seven in Canada, and number 13 in Austria.

== Versions ==
=== Album version ===
The song was first released on Adams' 1998 album On a Day Like Today, and is the only release where it appears in its original form. It was produced by Bob Rock and mixed by Adams' longtime collaborator, Bob Clearmountain.

=== Demo version ===
A demo version of the song appears on the CD single "The Best of Me", released in November 1999, following the chart run of the Chicane Mix. It features a prominent beat throughout the recording, provided by co-writer Max Martin. He used a similar beat on his early productions for Britney Spears. Also, the released demo version had a longer first verse than the one ending up on the album and all other subsequent versions. According to co-writer Gretchen Peters, who wrote most of the song's lyrics, it was Adams' decision to scrap the lines.

=== Chicane mix ===
It was remixed by British electronic artist Chicane, with synthesizers added, as well as a drum sample from Gota Yashiki's "Groove Activator". It was released as a single in May 1999 in Europe. The single reached number 6 in the UK Singles Chart, and became a top 10 hit in Ibiza. Chicane said upon its release in 1999, he'd turned down a previous offer of remixing a Bryan Adams single, due to a lack of time. Chicane later worked with Adams on the songs "Don't Give Up", "East Side Story", and "She's Got a Way".

Chicane's mix of the song was featured on Bryan Adams' compilation album The Best of Me, however simply titled "Cloud Number Nine". It appeared again on his 2005 Anthology album, this time correctly titled as "Cloud Number Nine (Chicane Mix)". The Chicane Mix has become the standard live version for Adams. In 2000, Chicane joined Adams onstage to perform this song and "Don't Give Up", as can be seen on the DVD Live At Slane Castle.

=== Bascombe Mix ===
Among the versions considered for a radio edit of "Cloud Number Nine", was a remix made by Dave Bascombe. The Bascombe Mix eventually ended up on the second CD of the UK single and hasn't appeared anywhere else since its release.

=== Live versions ===
Adams performed "Cloud Number Nine" live in a three piece setting during his extensive world tour, starting in 1999, with a stage set and costume designs mimicking the music video to the song. Live recordings of the song ended up on several CD and DVD releases in the next few years. Most versions are based on the Chicane Mix, at one time even performing it with Chicane himself. The song was performed during most subsequent tours, although most commonly with a full band setting.

== Music video ==
The music video made for this single, features mainly the color white. Adams is dressed in all white, in a white room with an Asian woman who is body painted all white. Various images and things that are white are featured in the video such as milk, white paint, eggs, a dove, and a white dog. The video contains several elements seen in Adams' previous music video, "When You're Gone" - most notably the tape recorder and the apples. While being reviewed on the Saturday morning show Live & Kicking on BBC One, dance producer Norman Cook commented: "The most positive thing I can say about it, is that it's very white."

== Track listings ==
UK CD1

1. "Cloud #9" (Chicane mix)
2. "Let's Talk About Love"
3. "When You're Gone" (acoustic version featuring Melanie C)

UK CD2

1. "Cloud #9" (Chicane mix)
2. "Cloud #9" (Bascombe mix)
3. Snippets ("C'mon C'mon"/"Inside Out"/"Where Angels Fear to Tread")

European CD single

1. "Cloud #9" (Chicane mix)
2. "Let's Talk About Love"

Australian CD single

1. "Cloud #9" (Chicane mix)
2. "Let's Talk About Love"
3. "When You're Gone" (acoustic version)
4. Snippets ("C'mon C'mon"/"Inside Out"/"Where Angels Fear to Tread")

== Charts ==
=== Weekly charts ===
Chart (1999)	Peak position
Australia (ARIA)	67
Austria (Ö3 Austria Top 40)	13
Belgium (Ultratip Bubbling Under Flanders)	7
Canada Top Singles (RPM)	7
Canada Adult Contemporary (RPM)	3
Czech Republic (IFPI)	2
Estonia (Eesti Top 20)	1
Europe (Eurochart Hot 100)	23
Germany (GfK)	33
Hungary (Mahasz)	7
Iceland (Íslenski Listinn Topp 40)	22
Ireland (IRMA)	16
Netherlands (Dutch Top 40 Tipparade)	8
Netherlands (Single Top 100)	62
Scottish Singles Sales (Official Charts)	5
Sweden (Sverigetopplistan)	43
Switzerland (Schweizer Hitparade)	26
UK Singles (Official Charts)	6

=== Year-end charts ===
Chart (1999)	Position
Canada Top Singles (RPM)	41
Canada Adult Contemporary (RPM)	15
UK Singles (OCC)	139
UK Airplay (Music Week)	44

== Certifications ==
Region	Certification	Certified units/sales
United Kingdom (BPI)	Silver	200,000^{‡}
^{‡} Sales+streaming figures based on certification alone.
