= The Best of Me (Bryan Adams song) =

Single by Bryan Adams

from the album The Best of Me
- Released: November 1, 1999
- Recorded: 1999
- Genre: Rock
- Length: 3:33
- Label: A&M
- Songwriters: Bryan Adams; Robert Lange
- Producer: Robert Lange

Bryan Adams singles chronology
| "Cloud Number Nine" (1999) | "The Best of Me" (1999) | "Don't Give Up" (2000) |

"The Best of Me" is a rock song performed and composed by Canadian rock and pop artist Bryan Adams. released as the first track on Adams second compilation album, The Best of Me. The single was released in November 1999 and became a hit single in Europe while ignored in the United States. "The Best of Me" peaked at 10 on the Canadian Singles Chart on 24 January 2000.

== Track listings ==
=== CD single 1 ===
| No. | Title | Writer(s) | Length |
|---|---|---|---|
| 1. | "The Best of Me" | Adams, Robert Lange | 3:33 |
| 2. | "Inside Out (demo)" | Adams, Gretchen Peters | 4:43 |
| 3. | "How Do Ya Feel Tonight (demo)" | Adams, Thornalley | 3:04 |

=== CD single 2 ===
| No. | Title | Writer(s) | Length |
|---|---|---|---|
| 1. | "The Best of Me" | Adams, Robert Lange | 3:33 |
| 2. | "Cloud Number Nine (demo)" | Adams, Peters, Max Martin | 4:12 |
| 3. | "Fearless (demo)" | Adams, Kennedy | 3:44 |

== Charts ==
| Chart (1999) | Peak position |
|---|---|
| Austria (Ö3 Austria Top 40) | 37 |
| Belgium (Ultratip Bubbling Under Flanders) | 3 |
| Canada Top Singles (RPM) | 10 |
| Canada Adult Contemporary (RPM) | 2 |
| Canada CHR (Nielsen BDS) | 13 |
| Czech Republic (IFPI) | 3 |
| Estonia (Eesti Top 20) | 6 |
| Finland (Suomen virallinen lista) | 9 |
| Germany (GfK) | 65 |
| Italy (FIMI) | 36 |
| Italy Airplay (Music & Media) | 4 |
| Netherlands (Dutch Top 40 Tipparade) | 17 |
| Netherlands (Single Top 100) | 67 |
| New Zealand (Recorded Music NZ) | 19 |
| Scottish Singles Sales (Official Charts) | 44 |
| Switzerland (Schweizer Hitparade) | 31 |
| UK Singles (Official Charts) | 47 |
