= On a Day Like Today (album) =

1998 album by Bryan Adams

Studio album by Bryan Adams
- Released: October 27, 1998
- Recorded: June–August 1998
- Studio: The Warehouse (Vancouver)
- Genres: Pop rock; soft rock
- Length: 50:34
- Label: A&M
- Producers: Bryan Adams; Bob Rock; Phil Thornalley; Phil Western

Bryan Adams chronology
Unplugged (1997)	On a Day Like Today (1998)	The Best of Me (1999)

Singles from On a Day Like Today
- 1. "On a Day Like Today" Released: September 22, 1998; 2. "When You're Gone" Released: November 30, 1998; 3. "Cloud Number Nine" Released: May 3, 1999; 4. "Inside Out" Released: June 26, 2000

On a Day Like Today is the eighth studio album by Canadian singer-songwriter Bryan Adams, released on October 27, 1998.

== Singles ==
"On a Day Like Today" was the first single released. It reached number thirteen in the UK and number one on the Canadian Singles Chart. Follow-up single "When You're Gone", featuring Melanie C, reached number three in the UK, and was in the top-ten for ten weeks, while peaking at number eleven in Canada. "Cloud Number Nine" reached number six in the UK and number seven in Canada.

== Critical reception ==
Professional ratings
Review scores
Source	Rating
AllMusic	2/5 stars
Entertainment Weekly	B+
The Rolling Stone Album Guide	1.5/5 stars
Encyclopedia of Popular Music	3/5 stars
Los Angeles Times	2.5/4 stars

On a Day Like Today received mixed reviews from critics. Writing for Entertainment Weekly, Tom Lanham gave the album a B+ rating, stating that "Adams started searching for that perfect balance of mature grace and useful guitar grind".

However, William Ruhlmann of AllMusic gave the album two out of five stars, claiming that "Adams simply had no contemporary audience left, and this was not the record to rebuild his career. It was defiantly bereft of ballads, nothing to break on the AC chart, and even if his rock audience had been listening, there was nothing here to rank with his earlier signature hits".

== Commercial performance ==
On a Day Like Today was a success around the world, peaking at number three in Canada, and number eleven in the UK. However at the time in the U.S. market, it became the first of Adams' albums since 1983's Cuts Like a Knife not to obtain a platinum sales certification. According to AllMusic, the record company did not do a lot of advertising for album, as Adams and this album got caught when his record company sold his recording contract to rap label Interscope, who in turn did very little in the US to promote it.

== Track listing ==
All tracks are produced by Bryan Adams and Bob Rock, except where noted.

No.	Title	Writer(s)	Producer(s)	Length
1.	"How Do Ya Feel Tonight"	Adams; Phil Thornalley		4:46
2.	"C'mon C'mon C'mon"	Adams; Gretchen Peters		3:36
3.	"Getaway"	Adams; Peters		3:47
4.	"On a Day Like Today"	Adams; Thornalley	Adams; Thornalley	3:28
5.	"Fearless"	Adams; Eliot Kennedy		3:52
6.	"I'm a Liar"	Adams; Peters		4:16
7.	"Cloud Number Nine"	Adams; Peters; Max Martin		3:45
8.	"When You're Gone" (with Melanie C)	Adams; Kennedy		3:24
9.	"Inside Out"	Adams; Peters		4:43
10.	"If I Had You"	Adams	Adams; Rock; Phil Western	4:03
11.	"Before the Night Is Over"	Adams; Martin		3:48
12.	"I Don't Wanna Live Forever"	Adams; Peters		3:14
13.	"Where Angels Fear to Tread"	Adams; Peters	Adams	3:47
Total length:				50:34

European, South American, and Australian release bonus track
No.	Title	Writer(s)	Length
14.	"Lie to Me"	Adams; Kennedy	4:37
Total length:			55:12

Japanese and Australian release bonus track
No.	Title	Writer(s)	Producer(s)	Length
15.	"Hey Baby"	Adams; Kennedy	Adams	4:37
Total length:				59:00

Japanese SHM-CD bonus tracks
No.	Title	Writer(s)	Producer(s)	Length
16.	"I Love Ya Too Much"	Adams	Adams	4:45
17.	"What Does It Do to Your Heart"	Adams; Kennedy		3:07
Total length:				66:47

== Charts ==
=== Weekly charts ===
Chart (1998)	Peak position
Australian Albums (ARIA)	38
Austrian Albums (Ö3 Austria)	4
Belgian Albums (Ultratop Flanders)	15
Belgian Albums (Ultratop Wallonia)	48
Canada Top Albums/CDs (RPM)	7
Canadian Albums (Billboard)	3
Danish Albums (IFPI Danmark)	13
Dutch Albums (Album Top 100)	24
Estonian Albums (Eesti Top 10)	2
European Albums (Music & Media)	4
Finnish Albums (Suomen virallinen lista)	13
French Albums (SNEP)	52
German Albums (Offizielle Top 100)	5
Italian Albums (FIMI)	18
New Zealand Albums (RMNZ)	28
Norwegian Albums (VG-lista)	34
Portuguese Albums (AFP)	12
Scottish Albums (Official Charts)	21
Swedish Albums (Sverigetopplistan)	27
Swiss Albums (Schweizer Hitparade)	2
UK Albums (Official Charts)	11
US Billboard 200	103

=== Year-end charts ===
Chart (1998)	Position
Canada Top Albums/CDs (RPM)	32
German Albums Chart	84
Chart (1999)	Position
Austrian Albums (Ö3 Austria)	46
German Albums Chart	45

== Certifications ==
Region	Certification	Certified units/sales
Austria (IFPI Austria)	Gold	25,000^{*}
Belgium (BRMA)	Gold	25,000^{*}
Canada (Music Canada)	2× Platinum	200,000^{^}
Denmark (IFPI Danmark)	Platinum	20,000^{‡}
Germany (BVMI)	Gold	250,000^{^}
Italy (FIMI)	Gold	50,000^{*}
Japan (RIAJ)	Gold	100,000^{^}
Spain (Promusicae)	Gold	50,000^{^}
Switzerland (IFPI Switzerland)	Platinum	50,000^{^}
United Kingdom (BPI)	Gold	100,000^{^}
Summaries
Europe (IFPI)	Platinum	1,000,000^{*}
^{*} Sales figures based on certification alone.^{^} Shipments figures based on certification alone.^{‡} Sales+streaming figures based on certification alone.

== Personnel ==
Dukes of Leisure

- Bryan Adams – vocals, guitars, bass, Mellotron, Wurlitzer electric piano, arrangements, string arrangements
- Keith Scott – guitars, six-string bass
- Mickey Curry – drums
- Dave Taylor – bass
- Danny Cummings – percussion

Honorary Dukes of Leisure

- Robbie Buchanan – keyboards
- Mike Gillies – programming
- Vincent Jones – Hammond organ
- Dave Pickell – acoustic piano, Hammond organ
- Phil Western – keyboards, programming
- Olle Romo – programming
- Phil Thornalley – guitars, bass, string arrangements (4)
- Bob Buckley – string arrangements
- David Munday – string arrangements (4)
- Vancouver Orchestra – strings
- Melanie C – vocals (8)

== Production ==
- Bryan Adams – producer, package design, photography
- Bob Rock – producer (1, 2, 3, 5–9, 11, 12, 14)
- Phil Thornalley – producer (4), additional recording
- Phil Western – producer (10), additional recording
- Randy Staub – recording
- Bob Clearmountain – mixing
- Dean Maher – additional recording, mix assistant
- Ron Obvious – technical engineer
- Bob Ludwig – mastering
- Gateway Mastering (Portland, Maine) – mastering location
- Sandy Brummels – art coordinator
- Glen Ross – package design
