= Rage (English group) =

English dance group

- Also known as: En-Rage
- Origin: United Kingdom
- Genres: Eurodance, house, pop, ambient music
- Years active: 1992–1995
- Labels: Pulse 8, Demon Music Group
- Past members: Hans Greeve; Duncan Hannant; Tony Jackson; Steve Lee; Barry Leng

Rage was an English dance music group composed of producers Barry Leng and Duncan Hannant, had drummer Hans Greeve and fronted by vocalists Tony Jackson (1992–1993) and Steve Lee (1995). The group were renamed En-Rage in Germany to avoid confusion with the German band Rage.

== Career ==
In 1992, the group released a dance cover version of Bryan Adams' "Run to You", which reached number 3 on the UK Singles Chart. Subsequent singles, including a dance remake of "House of the Rising Sun", fared less well on the chart, although an album titled Saviour was released in 1993.

Singer Tony Jackson, who had previously performed backing vocals for Billy Ocean, Amii Stewart and Paul Young, among others, died in June 2001.

== Members ==
=== Studio ===
- Tony Jackson – vocals
- Steve Lee – vocals
- Hans Greeve – drums
- Barry Leng – producer
- Duncan Hannant – producer

=== Live ===
- Tony Jackson – vocals
- Steve Lee – vocals
- Jeffrey Sayadian – guitar
- Angela Lupino – bass
- Toby Sadler – keyboard, piano, backing vocals
- Pierson Grange – drums

== Discography ==
=== Studio albums ===
- Saviour (1993) – AUS No. 144, AUT No. 40

=== Compilation albums ===
- Run to You – The Essential (2010) (digital-only)

=== Singles ===
Year	Single	Peak chart positions						Album
Year	Single	UK	AUS	AUT	GER	IRE	SWI	Album
1992	"Run to You"	—	—	—	—	—	—	Saviour
1992	"Be Yourself"	—	—	—	—	—	—	Saviour
1992	"Run to You" (re-release)	3	56	13	14	4	20	Saviour
1993	"Why Don't You"	44	209	26	40	—	39	Saviour
1993	"House of the Rising Sun"	41	171	20	—	—	—	Saviour
1993	"Give It Up"	97	—	—	—	—	—	Saviour
1995	"My Cryings Done"	—	—	—	—	—	—	Non-album single
"—" denotes releases that did not chart or were not released in that country.
