= One Night Love Affair =

Single by Bryan Adams

from the album Reckless
- B-side: "Lonely Nights"
- Released: September 1985
- Recorded: April 1984
- Studio: Little Mountain Sound (Vancouver, British Columbia)
- Genre: Rock
- Length: 4:33
- Label: A&M
- Songwriters: Bryan Adams; Jim Vallance
- Producers: Bob Clearmountain; Adams

Bryan Adams singles chronology
"Summer of '69" (1985)	"One Night Love Affair" (1985)	"It's Only Love" (1985)

"One Night Love Affair" is a song by Canadian singer and songwriter Bryan Adams. Written by Adams and Jim Vallance for Adams's fourth studio album, Reckless (1984), it was the fifth single released from the album. It is one of Adams's most recognizable and popular songs in North America. The song peaked at number 13 on the Billboard Hot 100 and number seven on the Top Rock Tracks chart and has appeared on Adams's compilation album Anthology (2005). It was the only single taken from Reckless with no music video, among the six that were officially released between 1984 and 1986.

== Lyrics ==
The song is about a one-night stand. The lyrics describe the encounter and the subsequent parting of ways of the protagonists, who, the song suggests, are concealing deeper feelings.

== Chart performance ==
"One Night Love Affair" was officially released to US radio in 1985, it appeared on the Billboard magazine's Hot 100 chart at 13 and 7 on the mainstream rock tracks. In Canada, "One Night Love Affair" was officially released to radio in February 1985. The song reached the top twenty on the Canadian Singles Chart and remained in the top twenty for another month. "One Night Love Affair" was the lowest charting single from Reckless (1984).

=== Chart positions ===
Chart (1985)	Peak position
Australia (Kent Music Report)	85
Canada (RPM)	19
US Billboard Hot 100	13
US Billboard Top Rock Tracks	7

== Live performance ==
According to Vallance, when the song was first played to Adams' guitarist Keith Scott, Adams and Vallance replaced the line "if the night was made for love, it ain't for keeps" with the line "if the night was made for love, it ain't for Keith". Scott found this very funny, and whenever Adams plays the song live, he looks at Scott and sings the "Keith" lyric.

== In popular culture ==
"One Night Love Affair" appeared on the soundtrack of the sci-fi comedy film Real Genius (1985) starring Val Kilmer. The song was used during the scene where the Pacific Tech students attend the Tanning Invitational pool party with the beauty school students.

== Personnel ==
- Bryan Adams – vocals, rhythm guitar
- Keith Scott – lead guitar
- Tommy Mandel – keyboards
- Dave Taylor – bass
- Pat Steward – drums
- Jim Vallance – percussion
