= Heaven (Bryan Adams song) =

1985 single by Bryan Adams

- North American and Australian single picture sleeve

Single by Bryan Adams

from the album Reckless and A Night in Heaven soundtrack
- B-side: "Heaven" (live)
- Released: April 9, 1985
- Recorded: June 7–8, 1983
- Studio: Power Station (New York City)
- Genre: Rock; power pop; soft rock
- Length: 4:03
- Label: A&M
- Songwriters: Bryan Adams; Jim Vallance
- Producers: Bob Clearmountain; Bryan Adams

Bryan Adams singles chronology
"Somebody" (1985)	"Heaven" (1985)	"Summer of '69" (1985)

Music video
- "Heaven" on YouTube

"Heaven" is a song by the Canadian singer and songwriter Bryan Adams recorded in 1983, written by Adams and Jim Vallance. It first appeared on the A Night in Heaven soundtrack album the same year and was later included on Adams' album Reckless in 1984. It was released as the third single from Reckless and reached number one on the U.S. Billboard Hot 100 in June 1985, over a year and a half after the song first appeared on record. The single was certified Gold in Canada in 1985.

Heavily influenced by Journey's 1983 hit "Faithfully", the song was written while Adams served as the opening act on the band's Frontiers Tour, and features their drummer, Steve Smith. It provided Adams with his first number one single and third top 10 hit on the Billboard Hot 100 chart. The track placed number 24 on Billboard magazine's Top Pop Singles of 1985.

== Writing and recording ==
Adams had played over 100 dates with Journey during 1983, serving as the opening act on their Frontiers Tour. During that time, he and Jim Vallance co-wrote "Heaven", which was inspired by Journey's hit "Faithfully". It was recorded at the Power Station in New York City on June 6 and 7, 1983. Halfway through the recording session, drummer Mickey Curry – who had warned Adams about his limited availability that day – announced that he had to leave since he had committed in advance to a Hall & Oates session. Since the recording session for "Heaven" was running behind schedule, Adams called Journey drummer Steve Smith, who happened to be in New York City at the time and he filled Curry's drumming position. The song first appeared on the soundtrack to the 1983 film, A Night in Heaven, although it was not released as a single at that time.

Adams was unconvinced that "Heaven" was suitable for his next studio album, Reckless, a feeling that was echoed by producer Jimmy Iovine, who was working with Adams at the time. Iovine thought the song was too 'light' for the album and recommended that Adams not include it. But at the last moment, Adams changed his mind.

== Reception and awards ==
For All Music Guide, Stewart Mason called the song "the power ballad that transcends the inherent cheesiness of the style to become a genuinely effective single." Mason also praised the "solid melody" and "appropriately bombastic arrangement...over which Adams delivers his most effective vocal performance ever."

In 1984, "Heaven" won the Procan Award (Performing Rights Organization of Canada) for Canadian radio airplay, in 1985, it won the BMI (Broadcast Music Inc.) Citation of Achievement for U.S. radio airplay and ten years later, it won a Socan Classics Award for more than 100,000 Canadian radio performances.

== Chart performance ==
"Heaven" first appeared on the A Night in Heaven soundtrack album in 1983 and received substantial airplay on album-oriented rock radio stations, reaching the number nine on Billboard's Top Tracks chart in February 1984. It was released as the third single from the album Reckless in April 1985 and hit number one on the Billboard Hot 100 chart, the highest-charting single from "Reckless". The song also re-entered the Top Rock Tracks chart at that time, peaking at number 27. "Heaven" also peaked at number 12 on the Adult Contemporary chart during its second run, becoming Adams' second single to reach that chart after "Straight from the Heart" in 1983, and his biggest AC hit until 1991.

In Canada, "Heaven" reached number 11 on the RPM Singles Chart.

The song was also released in Australia, Europe, and New Zealand in 1985. "Heaven" peaked at number 38 in the UK. In several mainland European countries, "Heaven" was the first hit for Adams. "Heaven" reached the top 10 in Sweden and Norway and then the top 20 in Austria, Ireland, Switzerland, and Sweden, it was a moderate top hundred success in Germany where it peaked at number 62. In Australia, it peaked at number 12.

== Music video ==
There were two videos; one was shot in the Orpheum Theatre in Vancouver, British Columbia, Canada, although the exteriors were filmed at the Stanley Theatre. It was directed by Steve Barron. The video includes appearances by Lysette Anthony, Garwin Sanford and Anthony Harrison.

The second video was shot at the Apollo Theatre in London, England, and features Adams singing the song in a live concert setting; behind him, 16 stacked video monitors show his band playing along. One hundred video monitors occupy each seat of the otherwise empty theater. At the end it is all revealed to be a dream of Adams. The video was nominated for an MTV Video Music Award for Best Cinematography.

== Track listings ==
All live tracks were recorded at the Hollywood Palladium on February 1, 1985.

- US 7-inch (A&M 2729)
1. "Heaven"
2. "Heaven" (live)
- UK 7-inch (A&M AM256)
1. "Heaven"
2. "Diana"
- UK 12-inch (A&M AMY256)
1. "Heaven"
2. "Diana"
3. "Heaven" (live)
4. "Fits Ya Good"

== Personnel ==
- Bryan Adams – vocals, piano, percussion
- Keith Scott – guitar
- Rob Sabino – keyboards
- Dave Taylor – bass
- Steve Smith – drums

== Charts ==
=== Weekly charts ===
Weekly chart performance for "Heaven"
Chart (1985)	Peak position
Australia (Kent Music Report)	12
Belgium (VRT Top 30 Flanders)	22
Canada (The Record)	6
Canada Top Singles (RPM)	11
Europe (European Hot 100 Singles)	100
Ireland (IRMA)	11
Netherlands (Dutch Top 40 Tipparade)	8
Netherlands (Single Top 100)	28
New Zealand (RIANZ)	17
Norway (VG-lista)	3
Spain (AFYVE)	9
Sweden (Sverigetopplistan)	8
Switzerland (Schweizer Hitparade)	14
UK Singles (Official Charts)	38
US Billboard Hot 100	1
US Adult Contemporary (Billboard)	12
US Rock Top Tracks (Billboard)	27
West Germany (Media Control Charts)	28

2020–2021 weekly chart performance for "Heaven"
Chart (2020–2021)	Peak position
Finland Airplay (Radiosoittolista)	77
US Digital Song Sales (Billboard)	36

2026 weekly chart performance for "Heaven"
Chart (2026)	Peak position
Global Excl. US (Billboard)	179
Portugal (AFP)	155

=== Year-end charts ===
Year-end chart performance for "Heaven"
Chart (1985)	Position
Australia (Kent Music Report)	45
US Billboard Hot 100	24

=== Decade-end charts ===
Decade-end chart performance for "Heaven"
Chart (1980–1989)	Position
Canada (Canadian Artists Digital Songs)	6

== Certifications ==
Certifications for "Heaven"
Region	Certification	Certified units/sales
Brazil (Pro-Música Brasil)	Platinum	60,000^{‡}
Canada (Music Canada)	Gold	50,000^{^}
Denmark (IFPI Danmark)	Platinum	90,000^{‡}
Italy (FIMI)	Gold	35,000^{‡}
New Zealand (RMNZ)	2× Platinum	60,000^{‡}
Portugal (AFP)	2× Platinum	50,000^{‡}
Spain (Promusicae)	Platinum	60,000^{‡}
United Kingdom (BPI)	Platinum	600,000^{‡}
^{^} Shipments figures based on certification alone.^{‡} Sales+streaming figures based on certification alone.

== DJ Sammy and Yanou version ==
"Heaven"

Single by DJ Sammy and Yanou featuring Do

from the album Heaven
- B-side: "The Blue"
- Released: November 21, 2001
- Genre: Eurodance; EDM
- Length: 3:52
- Label: Urban; Data; Ministry of Sound
- Songwriters: Bryan Adams; Jim Vallance
- Producers: DJ Sammy; Yanou

DJ Sammy singles chronology
"In 2 Eternity" (1999)	"Heaven" (2001)	"Sunlight" (2002)

Yanou singles chronology
"Heaven" (2001)	"On & On" (2003)

Do singles chronology
"Heaven" (2001)	"Heaven" (unplugged) (2002)

Music video
- DJ Sammy feat. Yanou & Do - Heaven (Official Video) on YouTube

Spanish DJ Sammy and German DJ Yanou recorded a dance cover of "Heaven" with vocals from Dutch singer Do. It was initially released on November 21, 2001, as the first single from DJ Sammy's second studio album, Heaven (2002).

As Yanou recalled in Jon Kutner and Spencer Leigh's book 1000 UK #1 Hits: "The reason I chose 'Heaven' is because I love it and it has a very special memory from my youth. I asked Do to sing on the trance track which she agreed to."

In a 2009 interview with Songfacts, Adams said: "Everyone loves this song, and I was thrilled at the dance version produced by Yanou. It's always interesting to hear how other people interpret your music, sometimes, like this version, they connect."

=== Chart performance ===
The song reached number one on the UK Singles Chart and number eight on the US Billboard Hot 100. On October 28, 2009, over seven years after its release, the song was certified gold by the Recording Industry Association of America (RIAA) for sales of over 500,000. It has also been certified double platinum by the British Phonographic Industry (BPI) for sales and streams of over 1,200,000 units.

=== Music video ===
The music video was directed by Oliver Bradford and was filmed in Berlin, Germany. It features Yanou, DJ Sammy and Do viewed briefly from a television. The video also features two East Asian girls, androgynous people, a Black man, and a family of four. There is a second version, with extended scenes of a stationary Do singing and no scenes of Yanou.

=== Live performances ===
Do performed the song with Westlife live in 2002 in the UK, and also with Westlife at the TMF Awards in 2003. Do also performed the song with DJ Sammy on Top of the Pops and several times together with Bryan Adams, in the Netherlands and Germany.

=== Track listings ===
Spanish maxi-CD single

1. "Heaven" (S'N'Y mix radio edit) – 3:54
2. "Heaven" (S'N'Y mix extended) – 5:16
3. "Heaven" (Green Court remix) – 8:27
4. "Heaven" (Simon & Shaker remix) – 9:01
5. "Heaven" (Commander Tom remix) – 6:35
6. "Heaven" (Anastasia remix) – 10:51
7. "Heaven" (Yanou's Candlelight mix) – 4:02
8. "The Blue" – 7:00

UK CD single

1. "Heaven" (radio edit)
2. "Heaven" (original mix)
3. "Heaven" (Flip and Fill remix)
4. "Heaven" (CD-ROM video)

US maxi-CD single

1. "Heaven" (radio version) – 3:55
2. "Heaven" (extended mix) – 5:15
3. "Heaven" (Green Court remix) – 6:19
4. "Heaven" (Commander Tom remix) – 6:35
5. "Heaven" (Anastasia remix) – 10:50
6. "Heaven" (Simon & Shaker remix) – 9:00

=== Charts ===
==== Weekly charts ====
Weekly chart performance for "Heaven"
Chart (2001–2007)	Peak position
Australia (ARIA)	4
Australian Dance (ARIA)	1
Austria (Ö3 Austria Top 40)	16
Belgium (Ultratop 50 Flanders)	14
Belgium (Ultratop 50 Wallonia)	36
Belgium Dance (Ultratop Flanders)	12
Canada (Nielsen SoundScan)	7
Canada CHR (Nielsen BDS)	16
Europe (Eurochart Hot 100)	8
France (SNEP)	5
Germany (GfK)	10
Hungary (Rádiós Top 40)	34
Ireland (IRMA)	3
Ireland Dance (IRMA)	1
Netherlands (Dutch Top 40)	5
Netherlands (Single Top 100)	12
New Zealand (Recorded Music NZ)	41
Norway (VG-lista)	8
Romania (Romanian Top 100)	28
Scottish Singles Sales (Official Charts)	1
Spain (Promusicae)	16
Sweden (Sverigetopplistan)	17
Switzerland (Schweizer Hitparade)	39
UK Singles (Official Charts)	1
UK Airplay (Music Week)	5
UK Dance (Official Charts)	3
US Billboard Hot 100	8
US Adult Contemporary (Billboard)	21
US Dance Club Play (Billboard)	30
US Mainstream Top 40 (Billboard)	4
US Maxi-Singles Sales (Billboard)	1
US Rhythmic Top 40 (Billboard)	23
US Top 40 Tracks (Billboard)	4

==== Year-end charts ====
2002 year-end chart performance for "Heaven"
Chart (2002)	Position
Australia (ARIA)	22
Australian Dance (ARIA)	6
Belgium (Ultratop 50 Flanders)	92
Canada (Nielsen SoundScan)	50
Europe (Eurochart Hot 100)	79
Germany (Media Control)	81
Ireland (IRMA)	26
Netherlands (Dutch Top 40)	59
Netherlands (Single Top 100)	81
UK Singles (OCC)	19
UK Airplay (Music Week)	42
US Billboard Hot 100	31
US Mainstream Top 40 (Billboard)	19
US Maxi-Singles Sales (Billboard)	2
US Rhythmic Top 40 (Billboard)	95

2004 year-end chart performance for "Heaven"
Chart (2004)	Position
France (SNEP)	66

==== Decade-end charts ====
Decade-end chart performance for "Heaven"
Chart (2000–2009)	Position
UK Singles (OCC)	77

=== Certifications ===
Certifications and sales for "Heaven"
Region	Certification	Certified units/sales
Australia (ARIA)	Platinum	70,000^{^}
France (SNEP)	Silver	125,000^{*}
New Zealand (RMNZ)	2× Platinum	60,000^{‡}
Norway (IFPI Norway)	Gold	
United Kingdom (BPI)	2× Platinum	1,200,000^{‡}
United States (RIAA)	Gold	500,000^{*}
^{*} Sales figures based on certification alone.^{^} Shipments figures based on certification alone.^{‡} Sales+streaming figures based on certification alone.

=== Release history ===
Release dates and formats for "Heaven"
Region	Date	Format(s)	Label(s)	Ref.
Europe	November 21, 2001	CD	Urban	
Australia	April 22, 2002	CD	Central Station	
United Kingdom	October 28, 2002	12-inch vinyl; CD; cassette	Data; Ministry of Sound	

== Do version ==
"Heaven" (unplugged)
- Single cover for the Candlelight Mix

Single by Do

from the album Do
- B-side: "On and On" (piano mix)
- Released: 2003
- Length: 4:04
- Label: Patriott
- Songwriters: Bryan Adams; Jim Vallance

Do singles chronology
"Heaven" (2001)	"Heaven" (unplugged) (2003)	"Love Is Killing Me" (2004)

Music video
- "Heaven" (Candlelight Mix) on YouTube

=== Candlelight Mix ===
A stripped-down "Candlelight Mix" ballad version was made and sung by Do, and received airplay on adult contemporary radio stations as well as contemporary hit radio stations. According to Yanou, Do had insisted on recording a slower version true to Bryan Adams' original.

=== 9/11 remix ===
An unauthorized remix of the Candlelight Mix was made by KKXX in Bakersfield, California to commemorate the first anniversary of the September 11 attacks, featuring a kindergarten-aged girl telling the story of her father's death in the attacks, interspersed with the original chorus. While the monologue is based on a true story, the girl was actually the daughter of a former KISS FM program director, who was reading off a script and did not know about the attacks at the time.

=== Charts ===
Weekly chart performance for "Heaven (Candlelight Mix)"
Chart (2003)	Peak position
Netherlands (Dutch Top 40)	5
Netherlands (Single Top 100)	4

Year-end chart performance for "Heaven (Candlelight Mix)"
Chart (2003)	Position
Netherlands (Dutch Top 40)	36
Netherlands (Single Top 100)	23

== See also ==
- Her Smell, a film that includes a rendition of "Heaven" performed by Elisabeth Moss
- "The Way Back" by Zach Bryan, a song that interpolates "Heaven"
