= On a Day Like Today (song) =

1998 single by Bryan Adams

Single by Bryan Adams

from the album On a Day Like Today
- B-side: "She Believes in Me"; "Bin There, Done That"
- Released: September 22, 1998
- Genre: Rock
- Length: 3:32
- Label: A&M; Mercury
- Songwriters: Bryan Adams; Phil Thornalley
- Producers: Bryan Adams; Phil Thornalley

Bryan Adams singles chronology
"I'm Ready" (1998)	"On a Day Like Today" (1998)	"When You're Gone" (1998)

Music video
- "On a Day Like Today" on YouTube

"On a Day Like Today" is a song by Canadian musician Bryan Adams, released on September 22, 1998, as the first single from his eight album, On a Day Like Today (1998). The song reached number one in Canada and number nine in Hungary. In the United Kingdom, it peaked at number 13 on the UK Singles Chart.

== Critical reception ==
Larry Flick of Billboard wrote, "This is the single that Adams supporters at top 40 radio have been waiting for. It shows him deftly straddling the line between the arena rock persona his diehard disciples adore and the softer, more ballad-driven crooner that made tunes like "(Everything I Do) I Do It for You" recurrent faves. On the title cut of his forthcoming album, Adams and collaborator Phil Thornalley have meticulously crafted a fine song that gradually builds from an introverted acoustic opening into a full-bodied rock power ballad. The element that makes this track work so well is an oh-so-subtle injection of psychedelic pop harmonies and quasi-symphonic strings. In the end, this is a refreshing release that bodes extremely well for the enduring artist's future at pop radio."

== Track listings ==
Canadian CD single
No.	Title	Writer(s)	Length
1.	"On a Day Like Today" (LP version)	Bryan Adams, Phil Thornalley	3:31
2.	"On a Day Like Today" (Pants Down mix)	Adams, Thornalley	3:29

UK CD1
No.	Title	Writer(s)	Length
1.	"On a Day Like Today"	Adams, Thornalley	3:30
2.	"She Believes in Me"	Adams, Eliot Kennedy	3:19
3.	"On a Day Like Today" (Pants Down mix)	Adams, Thornalley	3:29

UK CD2
No.	Title	Writer(s)	Length
1.	"On a Day Like Today"	Adams, Thornalley	3:30
2.	"Bin There, Done That"	Adams, Kennedy	3:21
3.	"The Only Thing That Looks Good on Me Is You" (alternate mix)	Adams, Thornalley	3:37

UK cassette single
No.	Title	Writer(s)	Length
1.	"On a Day Like Today"	Adams, Thornalley	3:30
2.	"She Believes in Me"	Adams, Kennedy	3:19

== Charts ==
=== Weekly charts ===
Chart (1998)	Peak position
Austria (Ö3 Austria Top 40)	32
Belgium (Ultratip Bubbling Under Flanders)	4
Canada Top Singles (RPM)	1
Canada Adult Contemporary (RPM)	1
Europe (Eurochart Hot 100)	46
Germany (GfK)	53
Hungary (Mahasz)	9
Netherlands (Dutch Top 40 Tipparade)	10
Netherlands (Single Top 100)	66
New Zealand (Recorded Music NZ)	19
Scottish Singles Sales (Official Charts)	12
Switzerland (Schweizer Hitparade)	32
UK Singles (Official Charts)	13

=== Year-end charts ===
Chart (1998)	Position
Canada Top Singles (RPM)	95
Canada Adult Contemporary (RPM)	14

== Release history ==
Region	Date	Format(s)	Label(s)	Ref.
Canada	September 22, 1998	CD	A&M	
United Kingdom	September 28, 1998	CD; cassette	A&M; Mercury	
United States	September 29, 1998	Contemporary hit radio	A&M	
Japan	October 7, 1998	CD	A&M	
