= Somebody (Bryan Adams song) =

Single by Bryan Adams

from the album Reckless
- B-side: "Long Gone"
- Released: January 1985
- Recorded: 1984
- Studio: Little Mountain Sound (Vancouver, British Columbia)
- Genre: Rock; pop rock
- Length: 4:42
- Label: A&M
- Songwriters: Bryan Adams; Jim Vallance
- Producers: Bob Clearmountain; Bryan Adams

Bryan Adams singles chronology
"Run to You" (1984)	"Somebody" (1985)	"Heaven" (1985)

Music video
- "Somebody" on YouTube

"Somebody" is a rock song written by Bryan Adams and Jim Vallance for Adams fourth studio album Reckless (1984). It was the second single released from the album Reckless. The song topped the U.S. Billboard Top Rock Tracks chart and peaked at number 11 on the Billboard Hot 100.

== Critical reception ==
Stewart Mason from Allmusic said "Following the Big Rawk Anthem ('Run to You') and the Sensitive Power Ballad ('Heaven'), 'Somebody' covers the third base as a straight-ahead singalong pop song with a killer chorus. A gift to an entire generation of cover bands working the bar circuit, 'Somebody' has a chorus so simple and catchy that you can actually sing along to it even if you've never actually heard the song before, and Adams and his indispensable musical partner, Jim Vallance, helpfully point out the feasibility of said activity by incorporating a large, somewhat ragged group of backing vocalists for the lengthy vamp of a fadeout. Rather like 'Run to You,' 'Somebody' is just slightly too schematic to qualify as an all-time heartland rock classic, but it still sounds good on the radio."

== Chart performance ==
"Somebody" was released in the winter of 1985 and became one of the most successful songs from Reckless on the American rock charts and arguably one of Adams' most recognizable and popular songs. The song was Adams' second number one hit on the Top Rock Tracks chart, where it spent two weeks, and peaked at number 11 on the Billboard Hot 100. "Somebody" reached number 13 on the Canadian singles chart and remained in the top 20 for six weeks. "Somebody" was Adams' third top 20 hit on the Canadian chart. "Somebody" was released the following month in Europe and peaked at number 20 in Ireland and at 35 on the UK Singles Chart becoming his third single to chart in Europe.

== Music videos ==
There are two music videos for the song. One features visual footage shot at the Massey Hall in Toronto, ON, over three nights on January 8, 9 and 10, 1985 of Adams and his band performing the song live, with the audience screaming in the background. The video was produced by Concert Productions International who used the single's soundtrack off the LP and mixed that with the sound of a taped audience. The other shows Adams walking out of a stadium and through a field, interspersed with shots of him with his guitar, as well as a woman (played by Lysette Anthony) who appears to be having relationship problems with her boyfriend; the video culminates with Adams walking out onto the field of a packed football stadium while a video of him playing the song plays on the big screen.

== Track listing ==
No.	Title	Writer(s)	Length
1.	"Somebody"	Adams, Vallance	4:44
2.	"Long Gone"	Adams, Vallance	3:57

== Personnel ==
- Bryan Adams – lead and backing vocals, lead and rhythm guitars
- Keith Scott – lead and rhythm guitars, backing vocals
- Tommy Mandel – keyboards
- Dave Taylor – bass
- Mickey Curry – drums
- Jim Vallance – percussion
- John Eddie – backing vocals

== Chart positions ==
Chart (1985)	Peak position
Canada (RPM)	13
Europe (European Hot 100 Singles)	90
Ireland (IRMA)	20
United Kingdom (The Official Charts Company)	35
US Billboard Hot 100	11
US Billboard Top Rock Tracks	1

== File sharing lawsuit ==
"Somebody" was part of the 24 songs, for which the first file-sharing copyright infringement lawsuit brought by major record labels to be tried to a jury. Jammie Thomas, single mother of four, was found liable in a 2007 trial for downloading the 24 songs from Kazaa and ordered to pay $222,000 ($9,250/song) in damages, in a second trial, in 2009, a jury again found against Thomas, this time awarding $1,920,000 ($80,000/song) in damages.
