= This Time (Bryan Adams song) =

Single by Bryan Adams

from the album Cuts Like a Knife
- B-side: "Fits Ya Good"
- Released: August 1983
- Recorded: 1982
- Genre: Rock
- Length: 3:20
- Label: A&M
- Songwriters: Bryan Adams and Jim Vallance
- Producers: Bob Clearmountain and Bryan Adams

Bryan Adams singles chronology
"Cuts Like a Knife" (1983)	"This Time" (1983)	"Run to You" (1984)

"This Time" is a hit song by Canadian musician Bryan Adams, appearing as the third track on his 1983 album, Cuts Like a Knife, and released as the third single from that album. The single went to number 24 on the Billboard Hot 100 and number 21 on the Top Rock Tracks chart during the fall of 1983. It also peaked at number 32 on the Canadian Singles chart. It reached number 41 on the UK Singles Chart in 1986. Additional backing vocals are done by Lou Gramm.

== Music video ==
The video was produced by Simon Fields and directed by Steve Barron, with cinematography by László Kovács. It was specifically created for MTV, which was then immensely growing in popularity.

It features Adams pulling up to a dusty motel in rural British Columbia, and checking into room #19. Adams stands in or near the lonely motel room, recalling a past relationship with a woman whose legs are only shown. Adams is also shown remembering pacing around the desert and frustratedly riding his motorcycle near railroad tracks, seemingly implying numerous lonely times when he failed to secure a stable relationship with the woman. The motel is presented as a place where he and the woman had previously stayed at some point, leading him to get lost in memories of the past.

Near the end of the video, Adams decides he can no longer take the bittersweet memories of the woman at the motel, grabs his stuff, and rushes to his truck to drive off. However, unbeknownst to him, the woman has found him at the motel, let the air out of his tires, and let herself into the back of his truck. When he opens the truck to throw his bag in the back, he sees the woman's legs, and happily joins her, while the nosy female motel clerk looks on excitedly through the window of her office.

== Personnel ==
- Bryan Adams – lead and backing vocals, guitars
- Keith Scott – slide guitar, backing vocals
- Tommy Mandel – Hammond B3 organ, Casio keyboards
- Dave Taylor – bass
- Mickey Curry – drums
- Jim Vallance – percussion
- Lou Gramm – backing vocals
