= It's Only Love (Bryan Adams and Tina Turner song) =

Single by Bryan Adams with Tina Turner

from the album Reckless
- B-side: "The Only Love"
- Released: October 25, 1985 (UK); November 4, 1985 (US)
- Recorded: 1984
- Studio: Little Mountain Sound (Vancouver, British Columbia)
- Genre: Hard rock
- Length: 3:15
- Label: A&M
- Songwriters: Bryan Adams; Jim Vallance
- Producers: Bob Clearmountain; Adams

Bryan Adams singles chronology
"One Night Love Affair" (1985)	"It's Only Love" (1985)	"Diana" (1985)

Tina Turner singles chronology
"One of the Living" (1985)	"It's Only Love" (1985)	"Typical Male" (1986)

Music video
- "It's Only Love" on YouTube

"It's Only Love" is a song by Canadian singer Bryan Adams and American singer Tina Turner. Released as a single on October 25, 1985, the song was nominated for a Grammy Award for Best Rock Performance by a Duo or Group with Vocal and the accompanying video won an MTV Video Music Award for Best Stage Performance. It was the sixth and final single from Adams' album Reckless (1984) and was included on Tina Turner's live album Tina Live in Europe (1988), as well as being added to both artists' greatest hits compilations: Adams' Anthology (2005) and Turner's All the Best (2004). It reached number 15 in January 1986 on the Billboard Hot 100 in the United States and number 29 in the United Kingdom. The 12-inch single included the 1985 live version that would later appear on the album Tina Live in Europe (1988).

Adams told Songfacts that this was his most memorable collaboration of all the ones he has done. He explained: "Working with Tina Turner was amazing. I used to go to see her in the clubs when I was in my late teens/early 20s before she hit the big time. It was incredible to watch her." He added: "It was such a privilege to have sung with her, especially since I was only 24 at the time."

Co-writer Jim Vallance witnessed the recording session with Tina and spoke about how her first vocal attempt didn't work. The suggestion was made that she try the melody "up a third", essentially a harmony line, which ended up being successful.

== Music video ==
The video is a live clip from Tina Turner's 1985 Private Dancer Tour. It begins with Turner in her trademark black leather minidress and jean jacket, introducing Bryan Adams. He then joins her on stage for a live performance of the song. The video won Best Stage Performance in a Video at the 1986 MTV Video Music Awards.

It was the first music video ever to use Skycam.

== Personnel ==
- Bryan Adams – lead and backing vocals, rhythm guitar
- Tina Turner – lead and backing vocals
- Keith Scott – lead guitar
- Tommy Mandel – keyboards
- Dave Taylor – bass
- Mickey Curry – drums

== Charts ==
Chart (1985–1986)	Peak position
Australia (Kent Music Report)	57
Austria (Ö3 Austria Top 40)	30
Belgium (Ultratop 50 Flanders)	22
Canada Top Singles (RPM)	14
Europe (European Top 100)	52
Ireland (IRMA)	18
Netherlands (Dutch Top 40)	20
Netherlands (Single Top 100)	21
New Zealand (Recorded Music NZ)	37
Spain Radio (PROMUSICAE)	34
Switzerland (Schweizer Hitparade)	16
UK Singles (Official Charts)	29
US Billboard Hot 100	15
US Mainstream Rock (Billboard)	7
West Germany (GfK)	44
US Cash Box Top 100	14

== Cover versions ==
H.E.R. and Keith Urban performed the song at the 2021 Rock and Roll Hall of Fame Induction Ceremony in honor of Tina Turner.
