= Cuts Like a Knife =

Studio album by Bryan Adams
- Released: 18 January 1983
- Recorded: 13 August – 20 October 1982
- Studios: Little Mountain, Vancouver, Canada; Le Studio, Morin-Heights, Canada; Power Station, New York City, US
- Genre: Rock
- Length: 38:53
- Label: A&M
- Producers: Bryan Adams; Bob Clearmountain

Bryan Adams chronology
You Want It You Got It (1981)	Cuts Like a Knife (1983)	Reckless (1984)

Singles from Cuts Like a Knife
- 1. "Straight from the Heart" Released: February 1983; 2. "Cuts Like a Knife" Released: May 1983; 3. "This Time" Released: August 1983; 4. "The Best Was Yet to Come" Released: November 1983 (Can. and NL)

Professional ratings
Review scores
Source	Rating
AllMusic	4.5/5 stars
MusicHound Rock	3.5/5 stars
Rolling Stone	2/5 stars

Cuts Like a Knife is the third studio album by Canadian singer-songwriter Bryan Adams. Released in January 1983 by A&M Records, the album was a huge commercial success in the United States and Canada. Three singles were released worldwide from the album: "Straight from the Heart", the title track and "This Time"; the three were responsible for launching Adams into mainstream popularity.

== Music ==
=== Recording and production ===
Co-produced by Adams and Bob Clearmountain, Cuts Like a Knife was recorded from August 13 to October 20, 1982, at Little Mountain Sound Studios in Vancouver, British Columbia, Canada, with Clearmountain mixing the album at Le Studio in Morin-Heights, Quebec and Power Station in New York City between October 14 to 20, 1982.

=== Songs ===
"Straight from the Heart" is a ballad and one of Adams' most recognizable and popular songs. It was written by Eric Kagna, a Vancouver singer/songwriter, and the instrumental bridge was contributed by Adams. The official songwriter credit is shared equally between Adams and Kagna. This track was the last recorded for the album, but the first single, released in February, one month after to the album's release. The song was later recorded by Welsh singer Bonnie Tyler in 1983; it appears on her album Faster Than the Speed of Night. Adams version reached the top 10 on the Billboard Hot 100 and 32 on the Mainstream Rock Tracks chart. The song has appeared on all of Adams' compilation albums with the exception of The Best of Me.

"Cuts Like a Knife" was released in May 1983 and became one of the most successful songs from Cuts Like a Knife on the American rock charts and one of Adams' most recognizable and popular songs from the 1980s. "Cuts Like a Knife" was released worldwide in March 1984. The song reached the top ten on the Mainstream Rock Tracks at six; "Cuts Like a Knife" would also chart on the Billboard Hot 100 at 15. "Cuts Like a Knife" was Adams' first top 20 hit on the Canadian singles chart and remained in the top 20 for six weeks. "Cuts Like a Knife" was released the following month in Europe but didn't chart.

"Don't Leave Me Lonely" was co-written with Kiss drummer Eric Carr, intended to be included on the Kiss album Creatures of the Night, but left off the final release.

"This Time" by Adams and co-writer Jim Vallance was the third single released from the album. Adams initially didn't care for the song and didn't want to record it, but eventually agreed to after the insistence of co-producer Bob Clearmountain. The song peaked at 21 on the Billboard Mainstream Rock Tracks chart, and at 24 on the Billboard Hot 100. "This Time" was Adams' first single to chart in Europe, where it charted after being re-released in the United Kingdom.

The final track on the album, "The Best Was Yet to Come", which was later covered by Laura Branigan for her 1990 self-titled album, is currently one of three songs written about Dorothy Stratten. The song was released as a single in specific territories.

== Release and reception ==
Cuts Like a Knife peaked at number eight on the Billboard 200. The album was released in January, 1983 and featured the hit singles "Straight from the Heart", "This Time" and "Cuts Like a Knife". "Cuts Like a Knife" and "Straight from the Heart" were nominated for a Juno Award for Single of the Year, and "Cuts Like a Knife" won the Composer of the Year award. In Canada "Cuts Like a Knife" was certified three times platinum and the album would also be certified platinum in the United States.

The success of Cuts Like a Knife outside of North America was not as great, though the album would later chart on the British album chart and be certified Silver by the BPI following the success of Adams' subsequent studio album Reckless in late 1984.

The music video for the song "Cuts Like a Knife" was one of the most popular videos broadcast on MTV during 1983 and is credited with fostering the album's success.

== Cuts Like a Knife tour ==
The Cuts Like a Knife tour started in eastern Canada. In March, Adams started the American leg of the tour; after five months Adams had performed over 100 dates. He later joined the British progressive rock band Supertramp on tour. Though not featured on the album, drummer for the tour was the late Frankie LaRocka and the keyboard player was Johnny 'Blitz' Hannah. Adams then traveled to Vancouver where he played live in front of 30,000 fans. Later on he went to Europe for a six-week solo tour; one show (and subsequent band interview) was broadcast live on German TV and radio as part of the famous Rockpalast series. He played in six countries. In November 1983, Adams went to Japan to start his own headline tour. By this time Adams had been on the road 283 days. Adams supported The Police when they toured in Australia and New Zealand.

== Track listing ==
All tracks are written by Bryan Adams and Jim Vallance, except where noted.

Side one
No.	Title	Writer(s)	Length
1.	"The Only One"		3:16
2.	"Take Me Back"		4:41
3.	"This Time"		3:20
4.	"Straight from the Heart"	Adams; Eric Kagna	3:31
5.	"Cuts Like a Knife"		5:17

Side two
No.	Title	Writer(s)	Length
6.	"I'm Ready"		3:58
7.	"What's It Gonna Be"		3:40
8.	"Don't Leave Me Lonely"	Adams; Vallance; Eric Carr	2:58
9.	"Let Him Know"		3:11
10.	"The Best Was Yet to Come"		3:04
Total length:			38:53

2012 Japan SHM-CD bonus tracks
No.	Title	Length
11.	"Take Me Back" (from Live! Live! Live!)	5:33
12.	"The Best Was Yet to Come" (from Live! Live! Live!)	2:53
Total length:		45:29

== Personnel ==
- Bryan Adams – lead vocals, backing vocals (1–9), guitars (1–3, 5, 6, 8), guitar solo (1, 2), piano (4), acoustic guitar (7, 9), electric guitar (7), harmony vocals (10)
- Keith Scott – guitars (1, 2, 4–6), guitar solo (1, 5–8), backing vocals (1–5, 7), slide guitar (3), electric guitar (7, 9), acoustic guitar (10)
- Tommy Mandel – Hammond B3 organ (1–3, 6–8), synthesizers (1, 6–8, 10), Casio keyboards (3, 4), organ (4, 5, 9), piano (9, 10)
- Dave Taylor – bass, backing vocals (5)
- Mickey Curry – drums
- Jim Vallance – percussion (2–4, 9), electric piano (10)
- Lou Gramm – backing vocals (1–3, 6–9)
- Alfa Anderson – backing vocals (2)
- Mark Doyle – backing vocals (4)
- Bruce Allen [credited as "B.A."] – backing vocals (5)
- Bob Clearmountain [credited as "B.C."] – backing vocals (5)
- K. Davies – backing vocals (5)
- L. Frenette – backing vocals (5)
- M. Simpson – backing vocals (5)
- Jimmy Wesley – backing vocals (5)

Production

- Bryan Adams – producer
- Bob Clearmountain – producer, recording, mixing
- Mike Fraser – assistant engineer
- Jeff Hendrickson – assistant engineer
- Paul Northfield – assistant engineer
- Robbie Whelan – assistant engineer
- Bob Ludwig – mastering
- Masterdisk (New York City, New York) – mastering location
- Jeffrey Kent Ayeroff – art direction
- Mike Fink – design
- Lynn Robb – design
- Jim O'Mara – front and back photography
- Roxy Rifkin – inner sleeve photography

== Charts ==
Weekly chart positions for Cuts Like a Knife
Chart (1983–86)	Peak position
Australian Albums (Kent Music Report)	32
Canadian Albums (RPM)	8
European Albums (Music & Media)	75
German Albums (Offizielle Top 100)	24
New Zealand Albums (RMNZ)	22
Swedish Albums (Sverigetopplistan)	22
UK Albums (Official Charts)	21
US Billboard 200	8

== Certifications ==
Region	Certification	Certified units/sales
Australia (ARIA)	Gold	35,000^{^}
Canada (Music Canada)	3× Platinum	300,000^{^}
Switzerland (IFPI Switzerland)	Gold	25,000^{^}
United Kingdom (BPI)	Silver	60,000^{^}
United States (RIAA)	Platinum	1,000,000^{^}
^{^} Shipments figures based on certification alone.
