= Inside Out (Bryan Adams song) =

2000 song by Bryan Adams

Single by Bryan Adams

from the album On a Day Like Today
- Released: June 26, 2000
- Recorded: 1998
- Studio: The Warehouse (Vancouver)
- Genre: Soft rock
- Length: 4:43
- Label: A&M
- Songwriters: Bryan Adams, Gretchen Peters
- Producers: Bryan Adams, Bob Rock

Bryan Adams singles chronology
"Don't Give Up" (2000)	"Inside Out" (2000)	"Here I Am" (2002)

"Inside Out" is a song by Canadian singer Bryan Adams from his album On a Day Like Today (1998). It is also featured on his greatest hits album The Best of Me. On some versions of this album, the song "Don't Give Up" with Chicane was added as a ghost track right after "Inside Out".

It was released as a single on June 26, 2000. The single included live versions of "Back to You" and "Rock Steady", recorded in South Africa, taken from the special edition release of "The Best of Me". There is a music video of the single, with the cover model as a robot. She also appears in one of Adams' photography books.

== Charts ==
Chart (1999)	Peak position
Canadian Singles Chart	17
Germany (GfK)	66
Netherlands (Single Top 100)	91
Switzerland (Schweizer Hitparade)	53

== Trisha Yearwood and Don Henley version ==
"Inside Out"

Single by Trisha Yearwood with Don Henley

from the album Inside Out
- Released: November 12, 2001
- Genre: Country
- Length: 3:34
- Label: MCA Nashville
- Songwriters: Bryan Adams; Gretchen Peters
- Producers: Mark Wright; Trisha Yearwood

Trisha Yearwood singles chronology
"I Would've Loved You Anyway" (2001)	"Inside Out" (2001)	"Squeeze Me In" (2002)

Don Henley singles chronology
"For My Wedding" (2000)	"Inside Out" (2001)	"It's So Easy" (2002)

American country music artist Trisha Yearwood recorded the song as a duet with Don Henley for her 2001 album of the same name. Yearwood's and Henley's version (their second collaboration after "Walkaway Joe") was a #31-peaking single on the U.S. country singles charts that year.

=== Charts ===
Chart (2001)	Peak position
US Hot Country Songs (Billboard)	31
