= When You're Gone (Bryan Adams song) =

1998 single by Bryan Adams

Single by Bryan Adams featuring Melanie C

from the album On a Day Like Today
- B-side: "Hey Baby"; "I Love Ya Too Much"; "What Does It Do to Your Heart"
- Released: November 30, 1998
- Recorded: June–August 1998
- Studio: The Warehouse (Vancouver)
- Genre: Pop; pop rock; soft rock
- Length: 3:25
- Label: A&M
- Songwriters: Bryan Adams; Eliot Kennedy
- Producers: Adams; Bob Rock

Bryan Adams singles chronology
"On a Day Like Today" (1998)	"When You're Gone" (1998)	"Cloud Number Nine" (1999)

Melanie C singles chronology
"When You're Gone" (1998)	"Goin' Down" (1999)

Music video
- "When You're Gone" on YouTube

"When You're Gone" is a song by Canadian musician Bryan Adams featuring English singer Melanie C, from the former's eighth studio album, On a Day Like Today (1998). The song was written by Eliot Kennedy and Adams, while produced by Adams and Bob Rock. It was released by A&M Records on November 30, 1998, as the second single from the album in addition to being Melanie C's first single outside the Spice Girls. Musically, it contains genres of pop, pop rock and soft rock, and is performed as a duet between Adams and Melanie C with a guitar solo.

"When You're Gone" received generally favorable reviews from music critics, who praised the production and Melanie C's vocals. The song peaked at number three on the UK Singles Chart and at number four on the Australian ARIA Singles Chart. An accompanying music video was released by German film director Marcus Nispel, which depicts Adams and Melanie C inside a house. Adams recorded another version of "When You're Gone" with Canadian-American actress Pamela Anderson for his compilation album, Anthology (2005), and as a new version with Melanie C for his album of re-recordings, Classic Pt II (2022).

== Background and release ==
"When You're Gone" was written by Bryan Adams and Eliot Kennedy during production of the former's eighth studio album On a Day Like Today (1998). Adams initially sought American musician Sheryl Crow to perform the song as a duet, but did not receive a response from her. He unexpectedly encountered Melanie C inside a hotel elevator in Los Angeles in August 1998, where he asked her to appear on "When You're Gone". Adams first met Melanie C on British music chart television show Top of the Pops (TOTP), during the Spice Girls' performance of their 1996 song "Wannabe". The song was recorded at the Warehouse Studio in Vancouver, Canada, from June to August 1998, with Adams and Bob Rock handling production. Kennedy recorded Melanie C's vocals and sent them to the Canadian studio where Adams worked from, to be inserted into the song.

"When You're Gone" was first released on radio airplay in Europe before being distributed as a single on November 30, 1998. The following month, on December 23, a CD single was issued in Japan. In the United States, A&M Records serviced the song to contemporary hit radio on March 2, 1999. "When You're Gone" is Melanie C's first appearance on a single since beginning a solo career, and is Adams' second single from On a Day Like Today. In 2005, Adams recorded a duet of "When You're Gone" with Canadian-American actress Pamela Anderson for his compilation album titled Anthology (2005). He phoned Anderson five times to convince her to record the song, as the latter initially thought she was being Punk'd. In July 2022, Adams and Melanie C released a new version of "When You're Gone" from Classic Pt II, the former's album containing re-recorded songs.

== Composition and critical reception ==
"When You're Gone"
A 21-second sample of the song, featuring its pop, pop rock, and soft rock genres accompanied by Adams and Melanie C's vocal duet.

Musically, "When You're Gone" is a pop, pop rock and soft rock song, which contains similarities to jangle-pop. The song is performed as a duet between Adams and Melanie C. A guitar solo consisting of 16-bars is played midway through the song. According to the sheet music published at Musicnotes.com by EMI Music Publishing, "When You're Gone" is based on 4/4 common time, the tempo is 126 beats per minute, and is played in the key of C major. The vocal range of both artists spans from the low note of G_{4} to the high note of A_{5}.

Dave Simpson of The Guardian wrote that "When You're Gone" is Adams' best written song, while NME writer Alexandra Haddow opined in a 2021 article that it is "one of the best pop songs of the last twenty years". JC Villamere of Entertainment Tonight Canada regarded the song to be an "absolute banger", and the Daily Record stated that it is a "catchy tune". Writing for Billboard, Chuck Taylor praised the natural melody, radiant hook, and infectious energy of the song, which he compared to Adams' 1984 song "Summer of '69", but critiqued that Melanie C's "rousing background vocals" is a gimmick to give the song exposure in the United Kingdom. However, Sam Taylor of The Observer considered the song to be "jarring" and described Melanie C's vocals as "wailing atonally". Writing about the rendition performed by Adams and Anderson, Keith Caulfield of Billboard criticized the latter's "featherweight background vocals", which were buried in the song and considered "novelty" for radio stations.

== Commercial performance ==
"When You're Gone" debuted at the peak of number three on the UK Singles Chart dated December 12, 1998, where it remained on the chart for 15 weeks. The song has been certified double platinum by the British Phonographic Industry (BPI). "When You're Gone" peaked at number three on the Irish Singles Chart, where it remained for 16 weeks. The song peaked at number six on the Norwegian VG-lista, where it spent 15 weeks on the chart, and was certified gold by the International Federation of the Phonographic Industry (IFPI). On the Swedish Sverigetopplistan, "When You're Gone" bowed at number eight, where the song remained on the chart for 17 weeks.

On the Australian ARIA Singles Chart, "When You're Gone" debuted at number 29 on the chart dated December 6, 1998. The song peaked at number four on the chart dated January 24, 1999, and charted for 21 weeks. It received a platinum certification by the Australian Recording Industry Association (ARIA), for selling 70,000 equivalent units in the country. In New Zealand, "When You're Gone" charted at number 15 on the New Zealand Singles Chart, where it spent 13 weeks on the chart. In Canada, the song peaked at number 12 on the RPM Top 100 Singles chart dated February 15, 1999.

== Music video and live performances ==
An accompanying music video was directed by German film director Marcus Nispel and released in 1998. It depicts Adams and Melanie C running around a house. Writing for The Guardian, Richard Benson described Adams' appearance as "green of face". On May 22, 2020, a high-definition (HD) version of the video was uploaded on YouTube. A new music video for the re-recorded version of "When You're Gone" by Adams and Melanie C was released in 2022.

"When You're Gone" is frequently performed at Adams' concerts as an acoustic version, which he picks an audience member to sing the song alongside him. Melanie C regularly included "When You're Gone" on the setlist of her live concerts. On January 8, 1999, Melanie C and Adams appeared on TOTP to perform "When You're Gone" as a duet. Adams performed "When You're Gone" in the first week of the live show on the third season of The X Factor Australia in September 2011. In November 2011, Adams appeared halfway through the contestants' group performance of the song on the eighth season of The X Factor UK. Melanie C performed "When You're Gone" with Irish singer Nathan Carter on the second season of The Nathan Carter Show on RTÉ One in November 2017, and with Adams during his concert in her hometown of Widnes in July 2022.

== Track listing ==
UK CD single 1

No.	Title	Length
1.	"When You're Gone"	3:25
2.	"Hey Baby"	3:48
3.	"When You're Gone" (Solo version)	3:25

UK CD single 2

No.	Title	Length
1.	"When You're Gone"	3:25
2.	"I Love Ya Too Much"	4:05
3.	"What Does It Do to Your Heart"	3:07

UK cassette single

No.	Title	Length
1.	"When You're Gone"	3:25
2.	"Hey Baby" (featuring Gretchen Peters)	3:48

Australian CD single

No.	Title	Length
1.	"When You're Gone"	3:25
2.	"On a Day Like Today"	3:30
3.	"Hey Baby"	3:48
4.	"I Love Ya Too Much"	4:05

== Charts ==
=== Weekly charts ===
Weekly chart performance for "When You're Gone"
Chart (1998–1999)	Peak position
Australia (ARIA)	4
Austria (Ö3 Austria Top 40)	14
Belgium (Ultratop 50 Flanders)	16
Belgium (Ultratop 50 Wallonia)	20
Canada Top Singles (RPM)	12
Canada Adult Contemporary (RPM)	8
Denmark (IFPI)	7
Europe (Eurochart Hot 100)	5
France (SNEP)	37
Germany (GfK)	14
Greece (IFPI Greece)	7
Hungary (Mahasz)	7
Iceland (Íslenski Listinn Topp 40)	29
Ireland (IRMA)	3
Italy (Musica e dischi)	20
Netherlands (Dutch Top 40)	6
Netherlands (Single Top 100)	7
New Zealand (Recorded Music NZ)	15
Norway (VG-lista)	6
Scottish Singles Sales (Official Charts)	2
Spain (Top 40 Radio)	1
Sweden (Sverigetopplistan)	8
Switzerland (Schweizer Hitparade)	11
UK Singles (Official Charts)	3
UK Airplay (Music Week)	1

=== Year-end charts ===
Year-end chart performance for "When You're Gone" in 1998
Chart (1998)	Position
Australia (ARIA)	70
UK Singles (OCC)	45

Year-end chart performance for "When You're Gone" in 1999
Chart (1999)	Position
Australia (ARIA)	83
Canada Top Singles (RPM)	36
Canada Adult Contemporary (RPM)	64
Europe (Eurochart Hot 100)	38
Germany (Media Control)	90
Netherlands (Dutch Top 40)	38
Netherlands (Single Top 100)	40
Sweden (Hitlistan)	85
UK Singles (OCC)	55
UK Airplay (Music Week)	25

== Certifications ==
Certifications and sales for "When You're Gone"
Region	Certification	Certified units/sales
Australia (ARIA)	Platinum	70,000^{^}
Denmark (IFPI Danmark)	Gold	45,000^{‡}
New Zealand (RMNZ)	Platinum	30,000^{‡}
Norway (IFPI Norway)	Gold	
United Kingdom (BPI)	2× Platinum	1,200,000^{‡}
^{^} Shipments figures based on certification alone.^{‡} Sales+streaming figures based on certification alone.
