= Cuts Like a Knife (song) =

- Sleeve for Canadian single

Single by Bryan Adams

from the album Cuts Like a Knife
- B-side: "Lonely Nights"
- Released: May 27, 1983
- Genre: Rock
- Length: 5:16 (Album Version); 4:05 (Single Version)
- Label: A&M
- Songwriters: Bryan Adams, Jim Vallance
- Producers: Bryan Adams, Bob Clearmountain

Bryan Adams singles chronology
| "Straight from the Heart" (1983) | "Cuts Like a Knife" (1983) | "This Time" (1983) |

"Cuts Like a Knife" is a song by Canadian rock musician Bryan Adams. It was released in May 1983 as the second single from his third studio album of the same name (1983). It peaked at number 6 on the Billboard Top Rock Tracks chart and number 15 on the Billboard Hot 100. The song has appeared on all of Adams' compilation albums with the exception of The Best of Me.

== Writing and recording ==
In an interview in 1988 with Vancouver's Georgia Straight newspaper, Adams explained how Vallance and he came up with the title for the song:

"I think that I'm one of the world's best mumblers, I can mumble some of the best lyrics, but putting them together is another story. I think that's where Jim is really good -- he can piece a story together. It's just a good thing to have the tape rolling when you're recording me. The best example was when we wrote "Cuts Like A Knife," which was just literally a mumble. We looked at each other, rolled the tape back, and it sounded like "cuts like a knife," so we started singing that."

Adams and Vallance jammed on the chord progression for a while. Adams sang "it cuts like a knife" over and over again. Vallance eventually responded with "but it feels so right." As Vallance described it, "There's a long tradition in pop music of songs that employ "na-na-na" choruses: "Hey Jude" by The Beatles, "Na Na Hey Hey Kiss Him Goodbye" by Steam, "Lovin', Touchin', Squeezin'" by Journey, and more recently "Drops of Jupiter (Tell Me)" by Train. Adams and I tapped into that tradition for the out-choruses of 'Cuts Like A Knife'."

== Release and reception ==
"Cuts Like a Knife" was released in 1983, peaking at number 15 on the Billboard Hot 100 and number 6 on the Hot Rock Tracks chart. The song reached number 12 on the Canadian singles chart and remained in the top twenty for seven weeks. "Cuts Like a Knife" was Adams' highest-charting single to date in Canada while the previous single "Straight from the Heart" was the higher charting song on the US Hot 100 peaking at number 10. "Cuts Like a Knife" won the Procan Award (Performing Rights Organization of Canada) for Canadian radio airplay in 1983 and was nominated for a Juno Award for Single of the Year in 1984.

Cash Box described it as a "tough talking break-up song" and praised Adams' "forceful," raspy vocal. Stewart Mason from Allmusic said "More of an anthemic rocker than the previous power ballad hit, "Straight from the Heart," "Cuts Like a Knife" breaks absolutely no new ground lyrically or musically, but as with his previous hit, Adams here proves his worth as both a singer and songwriter."

The B-sides of the singles were tracks from his previous albums, You Want It You Got It and his first album, except for the France single which had "Take Me Back" from the same album.

== Music video ==
The music video for "Cuts Like a Knife" was directed by Irish director Steve Barron, who filmed it inside an empty indoor swimming pool in Hollywood. The pool had been drained and out-of-use for several years. It would also become the location for Adams's platinum album party. The music video for "Cuts Like a Knife" was in heavy rotation on MTV during 1983 and was one of that year's most popular. The video uses the single edit of the song.

The woman seen in the video is a Penthouse magazine model named Raquel Pena. She later stated that she was chosen at the audition because "Steve Barron wanted someone with really long legs, and I wore a black bathing suit that he liked. I wore the same suit in the video. That's how low budget it was!"

== Track listings ==
US 12" Single
| No. | Title | Writer(s) | Length |
|---|---|---|---|
| 1. | "Cuts Like a Knife" | Adams, Vallance | 4:05 |
| 2. | "Fits Ya Good" | Adams, Vallance | 4:35 |
| 3. | "Hidin' from Love" | Adams, Vallance, Kagna | 3:17 |

UK 7" Single
| No. | Title | Writer(s) | Length |
|---|---|---|---|
| 1. | "Cuts Like a Knife" | Adams, Vallance | 4:05 |
| 2. | "Fits Ya Good" | Adams, Vallance | 4:35 |

France 12" Single
| No. | Title | Writer(s) | Length |
|---|---|---|---|
| 1. | "Cuts Like a Knife" | Adams, Vallance | 4:05 |
| 2. | "Take Me Back" | Adams, Vallance | 4:49 |

International 7" Single
| No. | Title | Writer(s) | Length |
|---|---|---|---|
| 1. | "Cuts Like a Knife" | Adams, Vallance | 4:05 |
| 2. | "One Good Reason" | Adams, Vallance | 4:22 |

== Personnel ==
- Bryan Adams – lead vocals, rhythm guitar, backing vocals
- Keith Scott – lead guitar, backing vocals
- Mickey Curry – drums
- Tommy Mandel – organ
- Dave Taylor – bass guitar, backing vocals
- Jim Vallance - percussion

=== Additional backing vocalists ===
- Bob Clearmountain
- Bruce Allen
- Jimmy Wesley
- K. Davies
- L. Frenette
- M. Simpson
- Lou Gramm

== Chart positions ==
| Chart (1983) | Peak position |
|---|---|
| Australia (Kent Music Report) | 55 |
| Canada Top Singles (RPM) | 12 |
| US Billboard Hot 100 | 15 |
| US Billboard Top Tracks | 6 |
