= Run to You (Bryan Adams song) =

1984 single by Bryan Adams

Single by Bryan Adams

from the album Reckless
- B-side: "I'm Ready"
- Released: October 18, 1984
- Recorded: March–mid 1984
- Studio: Little Mountain Sound (Vancouver, British Columbia)
- Genre: Rock; pop
- Length: 3:53
- Label: A&M
- Songwriters: Bryan Adams; Jim Vallance
- Producers: Bob Clearmountain; Bryan Adams

Bryan Adams singles chronology
"This Time" (1983)	"Run to You" (1984)	"Somebody" (1985)

Music video
- "Run to You" on YouTube

"Run to You" is a song by Canadian singer-songwriter Bryan Adams. It was released in 1984 by A&M Records as the lead single from his fourth album, Reckless (1984). The track deals with the subject of infidelity, and is sung from the perspective of a man who declares that he will continue to "run to" his seductive mistress over his faithful partner; critic Ira Robbins for CMJ called it a "cheating classic". In the accompanying music video, however, Adams portrays his guitar as the object of desire.

The song topped the US Billboard Top Rock Tracks chart and peaked at number six on the Billboard Hot 100. The single was certified gold in Canada in 1985.

== Writing and recording ==
After a tour in Asia, Adams started the recording for Reckless. The recording for "Run to You" started on March 27, 1984, at Little Mountain Sound, Vancouver, British Columbia, and continued through the middle of the year. It was mixed on September 21, 1984, in New York City by Jim Vallance. The song, written January 10, 1983, became the last song written for Reckless. Adams and Vallance originally wrote the song for Blue Öyster Cult, but the group turned it down. The song was then offered to .38 Special, who also declined to record the song.

Adams wrote the riff by jamming on his guitar, but never took it seriously because he had added a "really silly...background vocal part" to the demo that obscured the riff's potential. After writing the rest of the song and deciding to record it, he brought his entire band into the studio, and he said hearing the whole band play it "was like hearing the song for the first time. And that first take is what you hear on the album now." The UK 12 inch single (AMY224) states on the rear of the sleeve that contains a "specially remixed version" and that the "original version appears on the A+M album Reckless AMA5013". However, the label states that the track is taken from the album with a running time of 3min 59 sec.

== Release and reception ==
"Run to You" was released worldwide on October 18, 1984, and became one of the most successful songs from Reckless on the American rock charts and arguably one of Bryan Adams's most recognizable and popular songs. It was his first number one song on the Billboard Top Rock Tracks chart, a position it held for four weeks. It also reached number six on the Billboard Hot 100. "Run to You" reached the top 20 on the Canadian singles chart and remained there for seven weeks, peaking at number four. It held the highest Canadian chart position Adams had attained at the time of release and became his third top-20 single in Canada. It was nominated for a Juno award for song of the year in Canada. "Run to You" was released the following month in Ireland and peaked at number eight and reached number 11 on the UK Singles Chart. It was his second single to chart in Europe.

Billboard said it was "Full-blast rock" and that "Adams' raspy attack wrestles pop hooks into submission." Stewart Mason from AllMusic said "Run to You" was the first of the album's six top 30 hits, and in retrospect, "one of the weakest of the lot. Although the song has a thundering chorus, the kind that sounds truly excellent blasting through FM speakers, there is quite literally not much else to the song: of the song's nearly four-minute length, over half of the song is devoted to repeats of the chorus and an unimaginative instrumental breakdown that leads into a seemingly endless vamp on the chorus to fade." The long instrumental is indicative of the theme of the music video where the protagonist is serenading his guitar as the object of his affection.

In 1984, the song was promoted heavily in an episode of the NBC sitcom Double Trouble. The song was also featured in the action-adventure game Grand Theft Auto: Vice City (2002).

== Music video ==
Though the audio of the song sounds like desire for a mistress, the music video makes it obvious from the start that his desire is the playing of his guitar. The music video was shot in London, England and later Los Angeles. Directed by Steve Barron, it was nominated for the 1985 MTV Video Music Awards in five different categories: Best Direction, Best Special Effects, Best Art Direction, Best Editing, and Best Cinematography. While the song did not win any of the awards, it has received more MTV Video Music Award nominations than any other of Adams' songs. The English actress Lysette Anthony appears in the video.

== Track listings ==
- Single-CD: A&M Records / 580545-2 Europe
1. "Run To You" – 3:54 (Bryan Adams, Jim Vallance)
2. "Heat Of The Night (Live Version)" – 5:33 (Bryan Adams, Jim Vallance)
3. "Into The Fire (Live Version)" – 3:30 (Bryan Adams, Jim Vallance) 1
- Single-CD: A&M Records / S10Y3102 Japan
1. "Run To You" – 3:51 (Bryan Adams, Jim Vallance)
2. "Diana" – 3:52 (Bryan Adams, Jim Vallance)
3. "Into The Fire (Live Version)" – 3:30 (Bryan Adams, Jim Vallance) 2

== Personnel ==
Personnel are taken from the Reckless liner notes, except where noted.

- Bryan Adams – vocals, rhythm guitar
- Keith Scott – lead and rhythm guitar
- Tommy Mandel – Hammond organ, Casio keyboard
- Dave Taylor – bass
- Mickey Curry – drums
- Jim Vallance – percussion

== Charts ==
=== Weekly charts ===
Chart (1984–1985)	Peak position
Australia (Kent Music Report)	24
Belgium (Ultratop 50 Flanders)	19
Canada Top Singles (RPM)	4
Europe (European Hot 100 Singles)	40
Netherlands (Dutch Top 40)	14
Ireland (IRMA)	8
New Zealand (Recorded Music NZ)	14
UK Singles (OCC)	11
US Billboard Hot 100	6
US Top Rock Tracks (Billboard)	1

=== Year-end charts ===
Chart (1985)	Position
US Billboard Hot 100	66

== Certifications ==
Region	Certification	Certified units/sales
Canada (Music Canada)	Gold	50,000^{^}
Denmark (IFPI Danmark)	Gold	45,000^{‡}
New Zealand (RMNZ)	Platinum	30,000^{‡}
United Kingdom (BPI)	Platinum	600,000^{‡}
^{^} Shipments figures based on certification alone.^{‡} Sales+streaming figures based on certification alone.

== Rage version ==
"Run to You"

Single by Rage

from the album Saviour
- Released: 1992
- Genre: Dance
- Length: 3:41
- Label: Intercord
- Songwriters: Jim Vallance; Bryan Adams
- Producers: Barry Leng; Duncan Hannant

Rage singles chronology
"Run to You" (1992)	"Why Don't You" (1993)

English urban dance act Rage (known as En-Rage in some European countries) covered "Run to You" in 1992. After having failed to chart when released the first time in May 1992, the single gained an unexpected boost in popularity due to controversy in the UK music media about the band's name: they shared their name with a German heavy metal band who had been recording under the same since 1984. After changing their name to En-Rage in some European countries to avoid legal action from the German band, they re-released the single six months later, and this time, it peaked at number three in the UK (eight places higher than the Bryan Adams version) in November 1992.

=== Track listings ===
- CD-maxi
1. "Run to You" (7-inch) – 3:41
2. "Run to You" (instrumental) – 3:57
3. "Run to You (12-inch) – 5:43
4. "Ease the Pain" (full) – 5:02

=== Charts ===
==== Weekly charts ====
Chart (1992–1993)	Peak position
Australia (ARIA)	56
Austria (Ö3 Austria Top 40)	13
Belgium (Ultratop 50 Flanders)	6
Canada Dance/Urban (RPM)	1
Europe (Eurochart Hot 100)	14
Europe (European Dance Radio)	12
Finland (Suomen virallinen lista)	6
Germany (GfK)	14
Ireland (IRMA)	4
Netherlands (Dutch Top 40)	12
Netherlands (Single Top 100)	11
Sweden (Sverigetopplistan)	6
Switzerland (Schweizer Hitparade)	20
UK Singles (Official Charts)	3
UK Airplay (Music Week)	6
UK Dance (Music Week)	5
UK Club Chart (Music Week)	7
UK Indie (Music Week)	1
US Bubbling Under Hot 100 (Billboard)	18

==== Year-end charts ====
Chart (1992)	Position
UK Singles (OCC)	58
UK Club Chart (Music Week)	73

Chart (1993)	Position
Belgium (Ultratop)	76
Canada Dance/Urban (RPM)	21
Europe (Eurochart Hot 100)	83
Germany (Media Control)	60
Sweden (Topplistan)	56
