= Straight from the Heart (Bryan Adams song) =

- North American picture sleeve

Single by Bryan Adams

from the album Cuts Like a Knife
- B-side: "One Good Reason"
- Released: February 1983
- Genre: Soft rock
- Length: 3:32
- Label: A&M
- Songwriters: Bryan Adams, Eric Kagna
- Producers: Bryan Adams and Bob Clearmountain

Bryan Adams singles chronology
| "Lonely Nights" (1982) | "Straight from the Heart" (1983) | "Cuts Like a Knife" (1983) |

"Straight from the Heart" is a song was written by Eric Kagna, a Vancouver singer/songwriter, and the instrumental bridge was contributed by Canadian rock musician Bryan Adams. The official songwriter credit is shared equally between Adams and Kagna. The song was first recorded by Ian Lloyd in 1980, on his album Third Wave Civilization.

In 1981, Australian singer Jon English recorded the song for his 1981 album, In Roads. The song peaked at number 72 in Australia.

In 1982, teen band Rosetta Stone recorded it and issued it as a single in November that year.

In February 1983, Adams released a version as the lead single from his third studio album, Cuts Like a Knife.

== Chart history ==
It was his breakthrough song in the U.S., the first to make the top 40, reaching number 10. It also peaked at #32 on the Adult Contemporary chart, the first Bryan Adams single to appear on that chart. On the Canadian Adult Contemporary chart, "Straight from the Heart" reached number one.

| Chart (1983) | Peak position |
|---|---|
| Australia (Kent Music Report) | 98 |
| Canada RPM Top Singles | 20 |
| Canada RPM Adult Contemporary | 1 |
| UK Singles (Official Charts Company) | 51 |
| US Billboard Hot 100 | 10 |
| US Billboard Adult Contemporary | 29 |
| US Billboard Mainstream Rock | 32 |

| Year-end chart (1983) | Rank |
|---|---|
| US Top Pop Singles (Billboard) | 71 |

== Personnel ==
- Bryan Adams – lead and backing vocals, piano
- Keith Scott – guitars, backing vocals
- Tommy Mandel – organ, Casio keyboards
- Dave Taylor – bass
- Mickey Curry – drums
- Jim Vallance – percussion
- Mark Doyle – backing vocals

== Other versions ==
- Welsh singer Bonnie Tyler released it as a single in the UK 11 August 1983, and in the US as a B-side to "Total Eclipse of the Heart". It was featured on her album Faster Than the Speed of Night.
- Canadian singer Anne Murray, according to the liner Notes of her 2025 album “Here You Are”, had previously recorded the song for her 1984 album “Heart Over Mind”, but it did not make the cut. This song was finally released on “Here You Are", on September 5, 2025.
