= Dave Taylor (bass guitarist) =

Canadian musician (born 1953)

- Born: David George Taylor; February 20, 1953 (age 72); Vancouver, Canada
- Genres: Rock
- Occupation: Musician
- Instruments: Bass, keyboards
- Years active: 1978–present
- Spouse: Miesje (Mesha)
- Children: Robin Taylor, Samantha Taylor, Griffin Taylor

David George Taylor (born February 20, 1953, in Vancouver, B.C.) is a Canadian musician. He is best known for his work as long-serving bass player for Bryan Adams from 1982 to 1998.

According to Adams's YouTube channel, Taylor's first concert with Adams was at the Agora Ballroom in Cleveland, Ohio, on January 6, 1982.
