= I Finally Found Someone =

1996 single by Bryan Adams and Barbra Streisand

Single by Barbra Streisand and Bryan Adams

from the album The Mirror Has Two Faces
- Released: November 5, 1996
- Recorded: 1996
- Genre: Pop
- Length: 3:41
- Label: Columbia; A&M
- Songwriters: Barbra Streisand; Bryan Adams; Marvin Hamlisch; Robert John "Mutt" Lange
- Producer: David Foster

Barbra Streisand singles chronology
"As If We Never Said Goodbye" (1994)	"I Finally Found Someone" (1996)	"Tell Him" (1997)

Bryan Adams singles chronology
"Star" (1996)	"I Finally Found Someone" (1996)	"18 til I Die" (1996)

Music video
- "I Finally Found Someone" on YouTube

"I Finally Found Someone" is a song by American singer Barbra Streisand and Canadian singer Bryan Adams. The power ballad was part of the soundtrack of Streisand's 1996 self-directed movie The Mirror Has Two Faces and was nominated for an Oscar. Several versions of a CD single were issued on its initial release. One contains a rare Spanish-language version of her 1976 song "Evergreen", as well as Adams' previous single "Let's Make a Night to Remember". Another version includes three solo recordings by Adams from his most recent album.

"I Finally Found Someone" reached No. 8 on the Billboard Hot 100 and No. 2 on the Billboard Hot Adult Contemporary chart. The song gave Streisand her first significant hit in almost a decade and her first top-ten hit on the Hot 100 (and first gold single) since 1981. It also remains both artists' final Top 10 hit to date. The song was included on several reissues of Adams' album, 18 Til I Die. The single was also successful in several other countries, reaching No. 1 in Ireland, No. 2 in Australia, No. 6 in New Zealand and No. 18 in Adams' native Canada.

== Production ==
Barbra Streisand told The Los Angeles Times in 1996: "I wrote the love theme, the main love theme, then Marvin wrote a bridge to it, and that was going to be our song. Then David Foster had the idea that I should sing the duet with Bryan Adams. Bryan played our track and heard me humming and fell in love with this little theme that I wrote, and then he and his producer Mutt Lange wrote a counter melody based on the track that I sent him. And they wrote the lyrics. So that's how that happened. I don't think his record company wanted him to sing with me...because I'm more traditional, and I haven't had a hit since I don't know when."

A video clip was made of the single, which consisted of promotional shots of the pair and clips from the film, as well as documentary shots of Streisand directing. The song was played during the end credits of the film.

Upon Hamlisch's death, Adams tweeted "We co-wrote the Oscar-nominated song, 'I Finally Found Someone' (a No. 8 Hot 100 Adams-Streisand duet for her 1996 film The Mirror Has Two Faces). He was an amazing musician-composer and will be missed."

=== 69th Annual Academy Awards ===
The academy had originally wanted Streisand to sing "I Finally Found Someone" and asked her; however, Streisand declined the opportunity to perform the song at the Oscar ceremony. Various publications speculated that Streisand had snubbed the academy due to her film not being nominated for Best Picture. Natalie Cole was asked to step in to replace her but she became sick just before the show. As a result, Streisand offered to resume her role, but Oscar producers had already asked Céline Dion to do it instead. Streisand had been told that Dion had already started rehearsing the song along with "Because You Loved Me," which she was also set to perform. The director of the Oscars, Louis Horvitz, said that "Barbra called us after saying no several times, but the ship had sailed". Meanwhile, Streisand said that Dion would "be wonderful" and that "she can have the butterflies, not me". Streisand ended up taking a bathroom break while Dion performed the song, which led to press speculation of Streisand's divaness and the two singers feuding at the ceremony. Billboard would describe this event as a "faux media scandal". Nevertheless, the singer later apologised and claimed that the performance schedule was not made clear on the program. The Record said Streisand's decision not to perform despite being in the audience was an "especially strange development". The pair met during a commercial of the show, wherein Streisand invited her to sing a duet, a project that ultimately became "Tell Him," which gave her a second Grammy nomination in the Best Pop Collaboration with Vocals category for the 1998 ceremony alongside its inspiration "I Finally Found Someone."

== Critical reception ==
Larry Flick from Billboard magazine viewed "I Finally Found Someone" as "a lovely ballad that is rife with all of the delicious melodrama that one would expect from the legendary singer." He added, "Dueting with Adams seems odd at first, given the raspy texture of his voice next to her smooth tones. But it all makes sense as the song builds to its climax. His rockish drawl ultimately anchors the track and keeps it friendly to youth-driven pop formats. Still, it's the beauty of Barbra's incomparable style that is the soul of this fine, fine recording." Jay Bobbin from Boca Raton News described it as a "big music hit". Jeff Simon from The Buffalo News said Streisand is "fascinating" on the song. Moviefone deemed it as a "generic power ballad", and described Adams as " similarly overwrought". A reviewer from Music Week rated it three out of five, stating that "Streisand is in fine voice for this duet", adding that it is "guaranteed to soar high in the post-Christmas chart." Star Tribune's reviewer thought it was "stagily romantic", in which Adams is "full of purring sweet talk but doesn't really throw any sparks". The Mirror said the song is one of the few pieces that redeem the score to The Mirror has Two Faces." The Virginian Pilot deemed it "devoted". Arion Berger from The Washington Post wrote the Adams "speak-sings his way through" the song while Streisand is unrestrained.

== Accolades ==
- The song was nominated for Best Pop Collaboration with Vocals Nomination as a duet with Bryan Adams.
- The song gave Marvin Hamlisch his last Oscar nomination.
- The song became Streisand's second Best Song nomination (writing credit) at the Oscars after "Evergreen" in 1977.

== Track listings ==
- Single-CD: A&M Records / 582 083-2 Europe
1. "Barbra Streisand, Bryan Adams – I Finally Found Someone" – 3:42 (Bryan Adams, Barbra Streisand, Marvin Hamlisch, Robert John "Mutt" Lange)
2. "Bryan Adams – Star" – 3:42 (Bryan Adams, Michael Kamen, Robert John "Mutt" Lange)
3. "Bryan Adams – I Think About You" – 3:36 (Bryan Adams, Gretchen Peters)
4. "Bryan Adams – Do To You" – 4:11 (Bryan Adams, Robert John "Mutt" Lange) 1
- Single-CD: Columbia / 38K 78480 USA
1. "Barbra Streisand, Bryan Adams – I Finally Found Someone" – 3:42 (Bryan Adams, Barbra Streisand, Marvin Hamlisch, Robert John "Mutt" Lange)
2. "Bryan Adams – Let’s Make A Night To Remember" – 6:19 (Bryan Adams, Robert John "Mutt" Lange)
3. "Barbra Streisand – Evergreen (Spanish Version)" – 3:36 (Barbra Streisand) 2

== Personnel ==
- Barbra Streisand – vocals
- Bryan Adams – vocals
- David Foster – arrangements, acoustic piano, synth bass
- Claude Gaudette – synthesizer programming
- Keith Scott – electric guitar
- Michael Thompson – electric guitar
- Dean Parks – acoustic guitar
- John Robinson – drums
- Jack Hayes – orchestration and conductor

== Charts ==
=== Weekly charts ===
Chart (1996–1997)	Peak position
Australia (ARIA)	2
Austria (Ö3 Austria Top 40)	23
Belgium (Ultratop 50 Flanders)	6
Belgium (Ultratop 50 Wallonia)	14
Canada Top Singles (RPM)	18
Canada Adult Contemporary (RPM)	2
Estonia (Eesti Top 20)	12
Europe (Eurochart Hot 100)	17
France (SNEP)	40
Germany (GfK)	53
Iceland (Íslenski Listinn Topp 40)	34
Ireland (IRMA)	1
Israel (Israeli Singles Chart)	5
Netherlands (Dutch Top 40)	16
Netherlands (Single Top 100)	16
New Zealand (Recorded Music NZ)	6
Scottish Singles Sales (Official Charts)	24
Sweden (Sverigetopplistan)	9
Switzerland (Schweizer Hitparade)	17
UK Singles (Official Charts)	10
US Billboard Hot 100	8
US Adult Contemporary (Billboard)	2
US Adult Pop Airplay (Billboard)	19
US Pop Airplay (Billboard)	25

=== Year-end charts ===
Chart (1997)	Position
Australia (ARIA)	21
Belgium (Ultratop 50 Flanders)	42
Belgium (Ultratop 50 Wallonia)	83
Canada Adult Contemporary (RPM)	16
Europe (Eurochart Hot 100)	96
Sweden (Topplistan)	84
UK Singles (OCC)	144
US Billboard Hot 100	53
US Adult Contemporary (Billboard)	7

== Certifications ==
Region	Certification	Certified units/sales
Australia (ARIA)	Platinum	70,000^{^}
New Zealand (RMNZ)	Gold	5,000^{*}
United Kingdom (BPI)	Silver	200,000^{‡}
United States (RIAA)	Gold	500,000^{^}
^{*} Sales figures based on certification alone.^{^} Shipments figures based on certification alone.^{‡} Sales+streaming figures based on certification alone.

== Release history ==
Region	Date	Format(s)	Label(s)	Ref.
United States	November 5, 1996	—N/a	Columbia	
United Kingdom	January 27, 1997	CD; cassette	A&M	
Japan	February 10, 1997	Mini-CD	A&M	

== Cover versions ==
- The song was covered by country music artists Lorrie Morgan and Sammy Kershaw on their 2001 album I Finally Found Someone.
- Celine Dion performed the song live at the Academy Awards show in 1997 with trumpeter Arturo Sandoval performing Bryan Adams's part as an instrumental, since Streisand was unable to perform. Dion became the second female artist to have the privilege of singing two different nominated songs during the Academy Awards ceremony - Melissa Manchester had done the same in 1979. Dion was nominated for her own single "Because You Loved Me" in the same category that year, though they both lost to "You Must Love Me" from Evita.
