= Bryan Adams =

Canadian singer-songwriter and musician (born 1959)

Bryan Adams OC OBC FRPS
- Adams in 2026

Background information
- Born: Bryan Guy Adams; November 5, 1959 (age 67); Kingston, Ontario, Canada
- Genres: Rock; pop rock; soft rock; arena rock; heartland rock
- Occupations: Musician; singer; songwriter; record producer; photographer
- Instruments: Vocals; guitar; bass; harmonica; keyboards
- Years active: 1975–present
- Labels: A&M; Polydor; Universal; BMG; Bad Records
- Website: bryanadams.com

Bryan Guy Adams (born November 5, 1959) is a Canadian singer-songwriter, musician, record producer, and photographer. He is estimated to have sold between 75 million and more than 100 million records and singles worldwide, placing him among the best-selling music artists. Adams was the most played artist on Canadian radio in the 2010s and has had 25 top 15 singles in Canada and over a dozen in the U.S., UK, and Australia.

Adams released his eponymous debut album when he was 20 years of age. He rose to fame in North America with the 1983 top ten album Cuts Like a Knife; the album featured its title track and the ballad "Straight from the Heart", which became his first U.S. top-ten hit. His 1984 Canadian and U.S. number one album, Reckless, became the first album by a Canadian to be certified diamond in Canada and made Adams a global star; the album's six charting singles included "Run to You" and "Summer of '69", both top ten hits in the U.S. and Canada, and the power ballad "Heaven", a U.S. number one hit. His 1987 album Into the Fire, with its U.S. and Canadian top ten song, "Heat of the Night", rose to number two in Canada and the top ten in the U.S.

In 1991, He released "(Everything I Do) I Do It for You", which reached number one in at least 19 countries. The single was number one for 16 straight weeks in the UK; it is one of the best-selling singles of all time, having sold more than 15 million copies worldwide. The song was included on Adams's Waking Up the Neighbours (1991), a worldwide number one album that sold 16 million copies and was certified diamond in Canada. Another major hit from the album was the Canadian number one and U.S. number two hit "Can't Stop This Thing We Started". Beginning in 1993, Adams' hits were mostly ballads, including the worldwide number one or two hits "Please Forgive Me" (1993); "All for Love" (1993); and "Have You Ever Really Loved a Woman?" (1995), the latter two topping the U.S. Billboard Hot 100.

Adams was ranked 48th on the list of all-time top artists on the Billboard Hot 100. Adams has won 20 Juno Awards and a Grammy Award for Best Song Written for Visual Media amongst 16 Grammy nominations. He has been nominated for five Golden Globe Awards and three Academy Awards for his songwriting for films. Adams has been inducted into the Hollywood Walk of Fame, Canada's Walk of Fame, the Canadian Broadcast Hall of Fame, the Canadian Music Hall of Fame and the Canadian Songwriters Hall of Fame. On May 1, 2010, Adams received the Governor General's Awards in Performing Arts – Lifetime Artistic Achievement for his 30 years of contributions to the arts.

== Early life and family ==
Bryan Guy Adams was born on November 5, 1959, in Kingston, Ontario. He is the son of Elizabeth Jane (née Watson) and Conrad J. Adams, a British couple who immigrated to Canada from Plymouth, England, in the 1950s. One of his grandmothers was from Malta, as was one of his great-grandmothers. His father was a British Army officer who joined the Canadian Army, later working as a United Nations peacekeeping observer and Canadian foreign service diplomat.

Adams travelled with his parents to a diplomatic posting in Lisbon, where he attended St. Columban's School. At various points, he and his family also resided in Israel, Japan, South Korea, and his parents' native United Kingdom. Raised in Ottawa, he attended Colonel By Secondary School in the Beacon Hill neighbourhood of Ottawa.

Adams bought his first electric guitar at the age of 10 in Reading, an Italian brand from Gherson, based on a Fender Stratocaster. In an interview with music magazine Guitar World, Adams said:

I bought an imitation Les Paul at a Five and Dime store in Ottawa, Canada, in 1971. ... Before that, I had an imitation Strat which I bought in Reading, England in 1970. It felt real at the time to have a Les Paul, even though I'm a massive Ritchie Blackmore fan – still am. I was heavily into Humble Pie's Rockin' the Fillmore album at the time, and both Peter Frampton and Steve Marriott were on Les Pauls. It's rock guitar heaven, that album.

During his childhood, Adams was sent to a psychiatrist because he was not getting along with his parents. According to Adams, the psychiatrist told him that there was nothing wrong with him and that his parents needed psychiatric help.

In 1974, Adams, his mother, and his younger brother Bruce moved to North Vancouver while his father was posted abroad. While there, he attended Argyle Secondary School and Sutherland Secondary School.

Adams dropped out of school at age 15. He has said that his worst period of drug and alcohol abuse occurred before his 16th birthday. Once, after Adams had been arrested and thrown in jail, a sergeant said, "Your mum's come to pick you up, and when you go out there I want you to go and look at her and see how unhappy you are making her." Adams states that he went outside, looked at his mother, and thought, "Oh yeah, I can't do this to her anymore." Adams attributes the pockmarks on his face to his drug use.

Adams did not see his father for a period of 12 years following his parents' divorce. He later reconciled with him.

== Music career ==
=== 1970s ===
Adams left school to play in a group called "Shock" and used the funds his parents had saved for his college education to buy an Estey grand piano to tinker with. At one point he sold pet food and worked as a dishwasher in a restaurant, which paid the rent. His interest grew in CCR and Deep Purple; he attended concerts by Led Zeppelin, T. Rex, Elton John, and Tina Turner. He began working in the Vancouver music scene with bands and as a studio session singer. At the age of 15, he became the vocalist for glam rock band Sweeney Todd, replacing their original vocalist Nick Gilder.

With Adams the band re-recorded "Roxy Roller", the Canadian hit single from their first album, which came in at No. 99 on the U.S. charts. The band then recorded their second album If Wishes Were Horses (1977). Adams left the band at age 16. In 1978, at age 18, Adams met Jim Vallance through a mutual friend in a Vancouver Long and McQuade musical instrument store. Vallance was the former drummer and principal songwriter for Vancouver-based rock band Prism, and had recently quit that band to focus on a career as a studio musician and songwriter. They agreed to meet at Vallance's home studio a few days later. This became the beginning of a partnership which was prolific and continuous through the 1980s; together they co-wrote for Adams and a long list of recordings for other artists, including Kiss, Tina Turner, Joe Cocker, Johnny Hallyday, Bonnie Raitt, Rod Stewart, Bonnie Tyler, Loverboy, Carly Simon and Neil Diamond. The Adams/Vallance songwriting partnership, while discontinuous after the end of the 1980s, as of 2022, is still in existence.

Later in 1978, Adams signed to A&M records for one dollar. A&M remixed one of Adams' demos as a disco song "Let Me Take You Dancing", featuring Adams' vocals speeded up to meet the 122 BPM dance tempo. The song made the Canadian RPM chart in March 1979 along with its B-side "Don't Turn Me Away". He would later disavow this song.

In 1979, he made an agreement with Canadian manager Bruce Allen, who at that time also worked for Bachman–Turner Overdrive and Loverboy.

=== 1980s ===
Adams's self-titled debut album, mostly co-written with Jim Vallance, was released in February 1980. With the exception of "Remember" and "Wastin' Time", most of the album was recorded in October and November 1979 at Manta Studios and co-produced by Adams and Vallance. The album was certified gold in Canada in 1986. Singles released from it included "Give Me Your Love", "Remember" and "Hidin' from Love", with the latter having the most success, reaching number 64 on the Canadian RPM Current Hit Radio chart; none reached the U.S. Billboard Hot 100.

Adams's second album, You Want It You Got It, was released in 1981 and contained the FM album-oriented rock radio hit, "Lonely Nights", which reached number three on the U.S. Album Rock Tracks chart. The same song was reinterpreted by Uriah Heep for the album Head First, released in 1983. The most successful song off the album in Canada was "Fits Ya Good" which reached the top 30 on the RPM Top 40 Chart; it also reached number 15 on the U.S. Album Rock Tracks chart. From January to May 1982, Adams spent months traveling on his "You Want It You Got It Tour"; within a few months the album had been picked up across the United States and Adams was soon on tour opening for the Kinks and Foreigner.

Cuts Like a Knife, which was released in January 1983, was Adams's breakout album. "Straight from the Heart" was the first single released from the album; it reached number 10 on the Billboard Hot 100, number 20 on the Canadian RPM Top 40 chart, and number one on the Canadian Adult Contemporary Chart. In September 1983, Bonnie Tyler released her version for the studio album Faster Than the Speed of Night. The second single, "Cuts Like a Knife", rose to number 15 on the Billboard Hot 100, number six on the U.S. Album Rock Tracks Chart, and number 12 on the Canadian RPM Top 40 Chart. The third single, "This Time", was also a top 30 hit in the U.S. and Canada. Overseas, the latter two singles were both Top 20 hits in New Zealand, but there was little success in any other countries, aside from "Straight From the Heart" and "This Time" reaching the top 50 in the UK. Three other tracks, "Take Me Back", "I'm Ready" and "The Only One", also received substantial airplay on North American rock radio stations, each making the U.S. Album Rock Tracks chart. The album peaked at number eight on both the Billboard 200 album chart and in Canada, achieving three times platinum status in Canada, platinum status in the United States and gold status in Australia. In October, Adams joined Jim Vallance at the Yamaha Music Festival in Japan. The Music Express national popular opinion poll voted him Canada's best male singer for 1982. In 1983, Adams travelled to America, opening for Journey and performing on over 100 dates in five months. On July 30, 1983, he performed at Day on the Green at Oakland Coliseum.

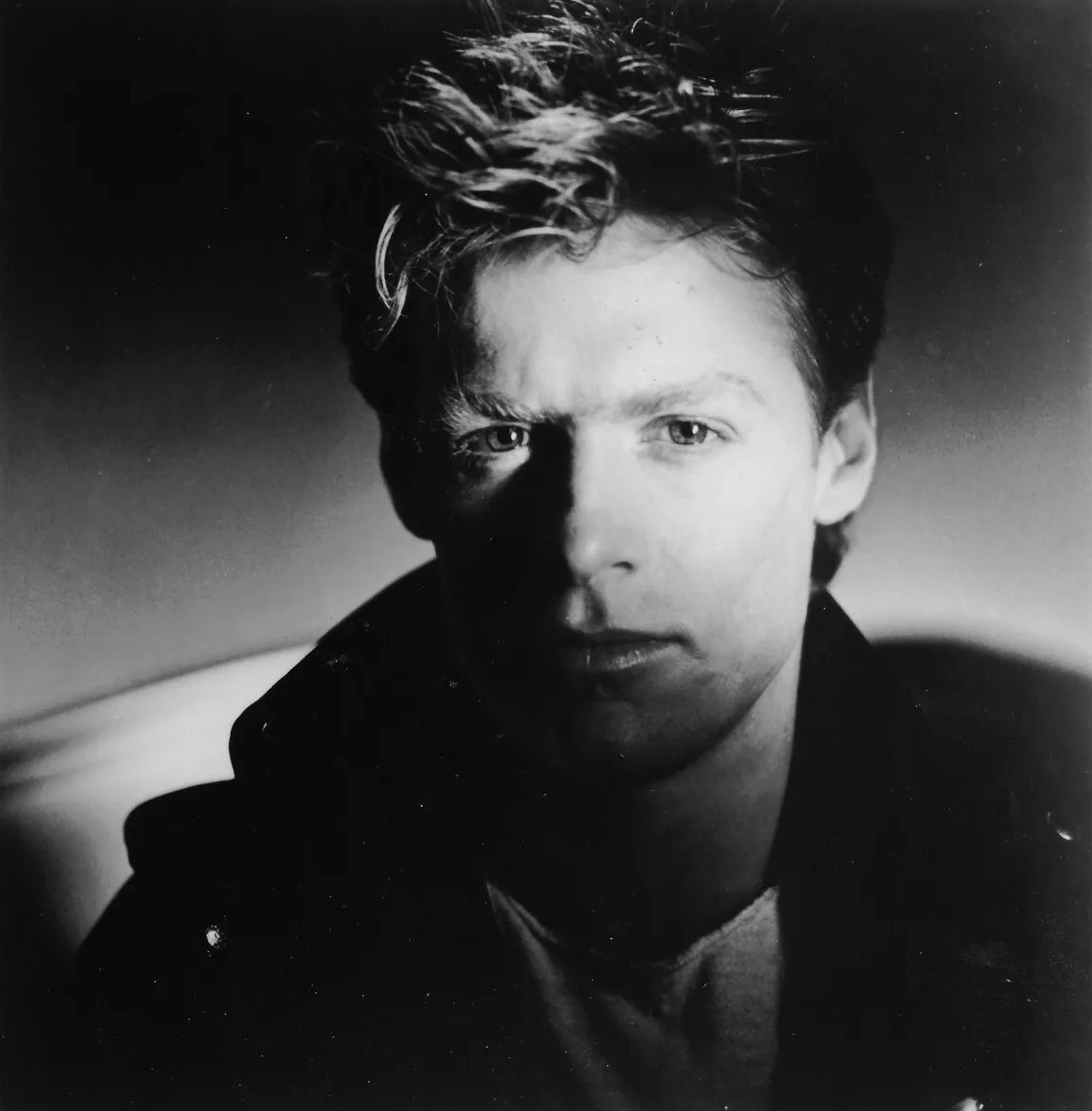
Adams in 1984

Reckless was released in late 1984, and peaked at number one on both the Billboard 200 and the Canadian Album Chart, while reaching number two in Australia and number seven in the UK. The album featured six singles, all of which peaked in the Top 15 of the U.S. Billboard Hot 100, only the third album to achieve this: "Run to You" (number six in the U.S., number 4 in Canada), "Somebody" (number 11 in the U.S.), "Heaven" (number 1 in the U.S., number 11 in Canada), written for the film A Night in Heaven, "Summer of '69" (number 5 in the U.S., number 11 in Canada), "One Night Love Affair" (number 7 in the U.S.), and "It's Only Love" (number 14 in the U.S.), a duet with Tina Turner. The album also did well in Europe, Australia, and New Zealand, although "Summer of '69" did not do as well at first in the UK since it was not played often on the radio; however, it achieved success later on in the UK, the Netherlands, and Belgium. "It's Only Love" was nominated for a Grammy Award for Best Rock Vocal Performance by a Duo or Group in 1986. In 1986, the song won an MTV award for Best Stage Performance. Reckless also earned Adams a Grammy nomination for Best Male Rock Performance. In December 1984, Adams embarked on a two-year world tour to launch the album. The tour included dates with Tina Turner for her Private Dancer Tour. Adams won Juno Awards for Best Male Vocalist in each year from 1983 to 1987. Reckless eventually went Diamond in sales in Canada, the first album by a Canadian artist to do so, while reaching 5× and 3× Platinum in the U.S. and UK. Reckless has sold over 12 million copies worldwide, and won the Juno Award for Album of the Year in 1985.

In February 1985, Adams recorded the charity single "Tears Are Not Enough" as a member of The Northern Lights, an improvised supergroup that also included Anne Murray, Gordon Lightfoot, Burton Cummings, Joni Mitchell and Neil Young, and other Canadian musical artists. Adams wrote the lyrics and the album; the mission was to raise funds to help the 1983-85 famine in Ethiopia. The song was issued as a single by Columbia Records in March of that year, and reached number one on the Canadian Top 40 chart. It also finished number one on the year-end Canadian charts for 1985. The song's video also received extensive airplay on MuchMusic. The single went triple platinum, although independently recorded by the USA for Africa project, it was included in the full-length We Are the World album. In July 1985, Adams performed the song at the Live Aid concert, at the JFK Stadium in Philadelphia, in front of over 100,000 people. In September 1985, Adams co-wrote two tracks for Roger Daltrey's sixth solo album Under a Raging Moon: "Let Me Down Easy", originally written for Stevie Nicks, and "Rebel". The album was a tribute to The Who's drummer Keith Moon, who died in 1978. The track "Let Me Down Easy" was a Top 15 Hit on Billboard's Mainstream Rock Tracks. Nearly 30 years later, Adams released his own version of "Let Me Down Easy" on a 30-year anniversary version of Reckless.

In January 1986, Adams provided the ending background vocals to the song "Don't Forget Me (When I'm Gone)" by Canadian rock band Glass Tiger for their debut album The Thin Red Line. It reached number one in Canada and number two in the United States.

His follow-up album to Reckless was Into the Fire (1987), dealing with more serious subjects following "Tears Are Not Enough". This album contained the hit songs "Heat of the Night", which went to the top ten in both Canada and the U.S., and "Hearts on Fire".

In December 1987, Adams contributed the song "Run Rudolph Run" to the compilation album A Very Special Christmas, a charity album to benefit the Special Olympics. The album received an RIAA certification of 4× platinum by the Recording Industry Association of America for shipment of four million copies in the United States. It is ranked 19th on the list of best-selling Christmas albums in the United States. In 25 years, it generated $109 million in royalties for the Special Olympics.

In May 1988, Tommy Mandel joined the Adams band as new keyboardist.

In the summer of 1989, Adams joined artists to provide backing vocals on a re-recording of the Deep Purple hit "Smoke On The Water" in aid of victims of the 1988 Armenian earthquake.

In August 1989, he recorded the backup vocals for the Belinda Carlisle song "Whatever It Takes" from the Runaway Horses album. Also during that time, Adams contributed to Mötley Crüe's work on the album Dr. Feelgood, doing the backing vocals of "Sticky Sweet" and Charlie Sexton doing the backing vocals of "Don't Look Back" from the Charlie Sexton album.

Adams performed at "A Night for the Environment" to raise funds for environmental organizations. In November 1989, Adams attended Tina Turner's 50th birthday party at the Reform Club in London. On New Year's Eve 1990, Adams performed at the Tokyo Dome.

In December 1989, Live! Live! Live!, his first live album, was released. It was recorded live at the Rock Werchter festival on July 3, 1988, in Werchter, Belgium.

=== 1990s ===
He returned to London and recorded the backing vocals for "Feels Like Forever", a song written by Adams for Eric Carmen. In 1990, he received the Order Of British Columbia. Adams added vocal tracks on the melody of David Foster's "River Of Love" in his home studio in Vancouver. On July 21, 1990, Adams performed the Pink Floyd tracks "Young Lust" and "Empty Spaces" at Roger Waters's concert production of The Wall – Live In Berlin, to commemorate the fall of the Berlin Wall eight months earlier.

In 1990, in a 45-minute songwriting session, Adams, Robert John "Mutt" Lange, and Michael Kamen wrote "(Everything I Do) I Do It For You" for the Robin Hood: Prince Of Thieves soundtrack. Kamen sent his score to a number of different artists before Adams, including Kate Bush who turned the score down. "Everything I Do" was released internationally on June 12, days after the premiere of the film, with the initial shipment of 385,000 copies being the largest single shipment in the history of A&M Records. It spent a record 16 consecutive weeks at Number One on the UK Singles Chart and seven weeks on top of the Billboard Hot 100. The song also gave Adams his first Golden Globe Award nomination for Best Song from a Motion Picture.

Adams and Vallance wrote "Nature Of The Beast", originally intended for Tina Turner, but recorded by The Law, featuring Adams on vocals and guitar tracks, in 1991. In May 1991, the music video for the song was created in Sheffield, directed by Julien Temple. In June 1991, a video was shot for the first single, "Can't Stop This Thing We Started", directed by Kevin Godley at Pinewood Studios in London.

On September 24, 1991, the album Waking Up the Neighbours was released. Co-produced by Adams and Robert John "Mutt" Lange, it topped the charts around the world, including in the UK, Canada, Australia and Germany and reached number six on the Billboard 200. It became Adams's second album to be certified Diamond in sales in Canada while being certified 5× platinum in the U.S. It went on to sell 16 million copies worldwide. Waking up the Neighbors became the first album by a Canadian since Neil Young's 1972 Harvest to reach the top of the album charts in the United Kingdom. The album caused controversy in Canada due to the Canadian content system, as the album was largely recorded in England and co-produced by Robert John "Mutt" Lange, originally from Zambia, making it not Canadian by the rules in effect at the time. Following Adams' complaints, in September of that year, the Canadian Radio-television and Telecommunications Commission (CRTC) announced that the Canadian content rules would be expanded. The regulation at that time considered collaborative writing between Canadians and non-Canadians to be "Canadian" only where the lyricist and musical composer worked separately and at least one was Canadian. In protest, Adams briefly threatened to boycott Canada's annual Juno Awards, where his album was eventually almost completely ignored by the awards committee. In 1992, he won the Juno International Achievement Award, Canadian Entertainer of the Year (voted on by the public) and Producer of the Year Award. In September 1991, the regulation was amended to recognize collaborations in which two (or more) contributors each contributed to both lyrics and music, as was the case with Adams and Lange.

In addition to "(Everything I Do) I Do It For You", the album included "Can't Stop This Thing We Started" (number two in the U.S. and number one in Canada), the ballad "Do I Have to Say the Words?" (number 11 in the U.S. and in the UK and number one in Canada), "Thought I'd Died and Gone to Heaven" (number 8 in the U.S.), and "There Will Never Be Another Tonight" (number 2 in Canada). The album won many awards including the Grammy Award for Best Song Written for a Motion Picture, Television or Other Visual Media in 1992. In July 1992, Adams performed at Wembley Stadium in front of 80,000 fans, the largest audience on his tour, with Little Angels and Extreme serving as opening acts.

In 1993, Adams collaborated with Rod Stewart and Sting for the single "All for Love" co-written by Adams for the soundtrack of the film The Three Musketeers. The single topped the charts worldwide.

In June 1993, Adams attended a tribute to Sam Cooke in which he played "Bring It On Home to Me" in a duet with Smokey Robinson.

In November 1993, Adams released So Far So Good, a compilation album that was certified 6× Platinum in the U.S., 3× Platinum in the UK, 6× Platinum in Canada, and 11× Platinum in Australia. It included a new song called "Please Forgive Me", which peaked at number two in the UK, number 7 in the U.S. and was the 10th most popular song in Australia in 1993.

In 1994, Adams became the first Western artist to perform in Vietnam since James Brown played there in 1971 at the end of the Vietnam War.

In October 1994, Adams sang one of his favorite songs, "Hound Dog", at the Elvis Presley tribute concert in Memphis.

In September 1994, at the benefit concert Pavarotti & Friends, Adams sang "Please Forgive Me", and a version of "All for Love" featuring Luciano Pavarotti, Andrea Bocelli, Nancy Gustafson, and Giorgia Todrani.

In 1995, Adams released "Have You Ever Really Loved a Woman?". It was a number one in the U.S., Canada and Australia, as well as a top five hit in the UK and Germany. The single was nominated for the Oscar, Grammy and Golden Globe Award for Best Original Song.

In June 1996, the album 18 til I Die was released. It contained the songs: "The Only Thing That Looks Good on Me Is You" (number 1 in Canada), "Let's Make a Night to Remember" (number 1 in Canada), "Have You Ever Really Loved a Woman?" (number 1 in Canada), and "Star", which is included in the soundtrack of the film Jack. The album reached number 1 on the UK charts while also reaching number two in Australia and number four in Canada. The album was less successful in the U.S. only reaching number 31 on the Billboard 200, but was certified platinum in the United States by the RIAA. 18 til I Die was certified three times platinum in Canada and Australia and two times platinum in the UK.

In November 1996, "I Finally Found Someone" was released, which was recorded by Bryan Adams and Barbra Streisand as part of the soundtrack of Streisand's self-directed film The Mirror Has Two Faces. The song was nominated for an Academy Awards and Golden Globe Awards. It peaked at number 8 on the Billboard Hot 100.

In November 1997, Adams penned new lyrics to the Jean-Jacques Goldman song "Puisque tu pars" also written that month, remade as Let's Talk About Love recorded by Celine Dion.

In 1999, a demo version of Adams' translation appeared on the single CD "Cloud Number Nine" in 1999. In December 1997, Adams released MTV Unplugged with three new tracks: "Back to You", "A Little Love" and "When You Love Someone". "Back to You" was the first single, followed by "I'm Ready", an acoustic version of the song from the album Cuts Like A Knife. The album was a top ten success in Germany while both singles reached the top 20 in the UK.

On a Day Like Today was released in 1998 and the release coincided with his contract being sold to Interscope Records. On a Day Like Today enjoyed success internationally, entering the top five in Germany and Canada and was certified platinum in the UK. It generated two British top ten singles: "Cloud Number Nine" and "When You're Gone", which featured Melanie C of the Spice Girls and peaked at number 3. The song has sold 830,000 combined equivalent-sales in the UK as of May 2019.

To commemorate the millennium, Adams released The Best of Me, his most comprehensive collection of songs at that time, which included two new songs, the title track "The Best of Me" and "Don't Give Up" (number 1 in the UK). The album reached the top ten in Germany and was certified three times platinum in Canada and Platinum in the UK. The single from the album, "The Best of Me" was a successful hit with the exception of the U.S., where neither the single or the album were released by Interscope Records, the single peaked at 10 on the Canadian Singles Chart on January 24, 2000.

Adams sang on the title track and the song "Without You" for Tina Turner's album Twenty Four Seven, released in October 1999. Adams attended Turner's 60th birthday party in London, at which they performed "It's Only Love". It was released on DVD.

On New Year's Eve, December 31, 2000, Adams performed with Celine Dion at the Bell Center in Montreal.

=== 2000s ===
In October 2000, Adams sang "Sad Songs (Say So Much)" with Elton John at Madison Square Garden for the live album Elton John One Night Only – The Greatest Hits.

On August 26, 2000, he performed at the Slane Festival in front of over 70,000 people, with special appearances by Melanie C, Chicane and Davy Spillane. The concert was also released on CD/DVD as Live at Slane Castle, Ireland.

On November 27, 2000, Adams performed at The Who & Special Guests: Live at the Royal Albert Hall, a benefit concert organized by The Who, singing a song by the English band, Behind Blue Eyes and See Me, Feel Me with Eddie Vedder. The concert was also released on CD as Live at the Royal Albert Hall.

Adams co-wrote and performed the songs for the DreamWorks animated film Spirit: Stallion of the Cimarron in 2002. The songs were included on the film's soundtrack. The most successful single from the soundtrack was "Here I Am", a British top five and German Top 20 hit. Adams received his fourth Golden Globe Award nomination for Best Song from a Motion Picture from the song.

In 2004, Adams was ranked 13th on the ARC Weekly chart of top pop artists of the last 25 years, with four number-one singles, ten top five hits and 17 Top-10 hits.

Room Service was released in September 2004. It topped the charts in Germany and Switzerland and peaked at number four in the UK, selling 440,000 copies in its first week in Europe and thus debuted at number one on Billboard's European album chart. The single, "Open Road", was the most successful single from the album and peaked at number one in Canada and number twenty-one in the UK. In May 2008, the album was also released in the U.S., charting at number 134 on the Billboard 200.

From June to August 2005, Adams co-headlined a concert tour with Def Leppard that took place at minor league baseball stadiums. In July 2005, Adams performed at Live 8 in Barrie.

In 2006, Adams co-wrote and performed the theme music "Never Let Go" which was featured in the closing credits of the film The Guardian.

In April 2006, he was inducted into the Canadian Music Hall of Fame. Also in 2006, Adams co-wrote the Grammy Award-winning gospel song "Never Gonna Break My Faith" for Aretha Franklin. It was featured in the film Bobby as a duet by Aretha Franklin and Mary J. Blige with the Boys Choir of Harlem and earned him a Golden Globe Nomination in 2007.

On July 31, 2006, together with Billy Joel, he performed in a free concert with an estimated crowd of over 500,000 people in Rome at Via dei Fori Imperiali, with the Colosseum as a background.

In May 2007, on the occasion of his 25th concert at the Wembley Arena, he received the "Wembley Square Of Fame", a bronze plaque engraved with his name and handprints at Wembley Park.

Also in 2007, Adams co-wrote two songs "A Place for Us" and "Another Layer" for the Disney film Bridge to Terabithia.

Adams released his eleventh album, 11, internationally on March 17, 2008. The album was released in the U.S. exclusively at Wal-Mart and Sam's Club retail stores on May 13, 2008. The first single released from the album was "I Thought I'd Seen Everything". In March 2008, Adams played an 11-day, 11-country European acoustic tour to promote the album. The album debuted at number one in Canada, making it his first album to reach that position since Waking Up the Neighbours in 1991, and reached number two in Germany. In the United States, the album charted at number 80. In June and July 2008, he toured the U.S., playing some shows with Foreigner and on others with Rod Stewart.

Adams was one of four musicians who were pictured on the second series of the Canadian Recording Artist Series to be issued by Canada Post stamps on July 2, 2009, with estimated one and one-half million Adams stamps printed.

On June 26, 2009, he performed some of his hits on an episode of CMT Crossroads with Jason Aldean.

In November 2009, he co-wrote, produced, and performed the song "You've Been a Friend to Me" for the film Old Dogs.

=== 2010s ===
In February 2010, Adams released "One World, One Flame". On February 12, 2010, at the 2010 Winter Olympics opening ceremony at BC Place Stadium, Adams performed "Bang the Drum", a duet with Nelly Furtado co-written with Jim Vallance for the event.

In May 2010, Adams was one of several Canadian musicians to visit Canadian Prime Minister Stephen Harper at his official residence. Originally, the visit was meant to be Adams's plea to the Prime Minister to change copyright laws; instead, Harper turned it into an informal jam session.

In November 2010, Adams released the acoustic album Bare Bones, a live project consisting of twenty songs, to celebrate thirty years of career. Gary Breit accompanies on piano. Adams then embarked on "The Bare Bones Tour", an acoustic tour, and integrated acoustic concerts into other tours.

Adams performed at the opening ceremony of the 2011 Cricket World Cup on February 17, 2011, in Dhaka, Bangladesh.

On February 19, 2011, Adams and his band played in Kathmandu, which was organized by ODC Network and made him the first international artist to perform in Nepal.

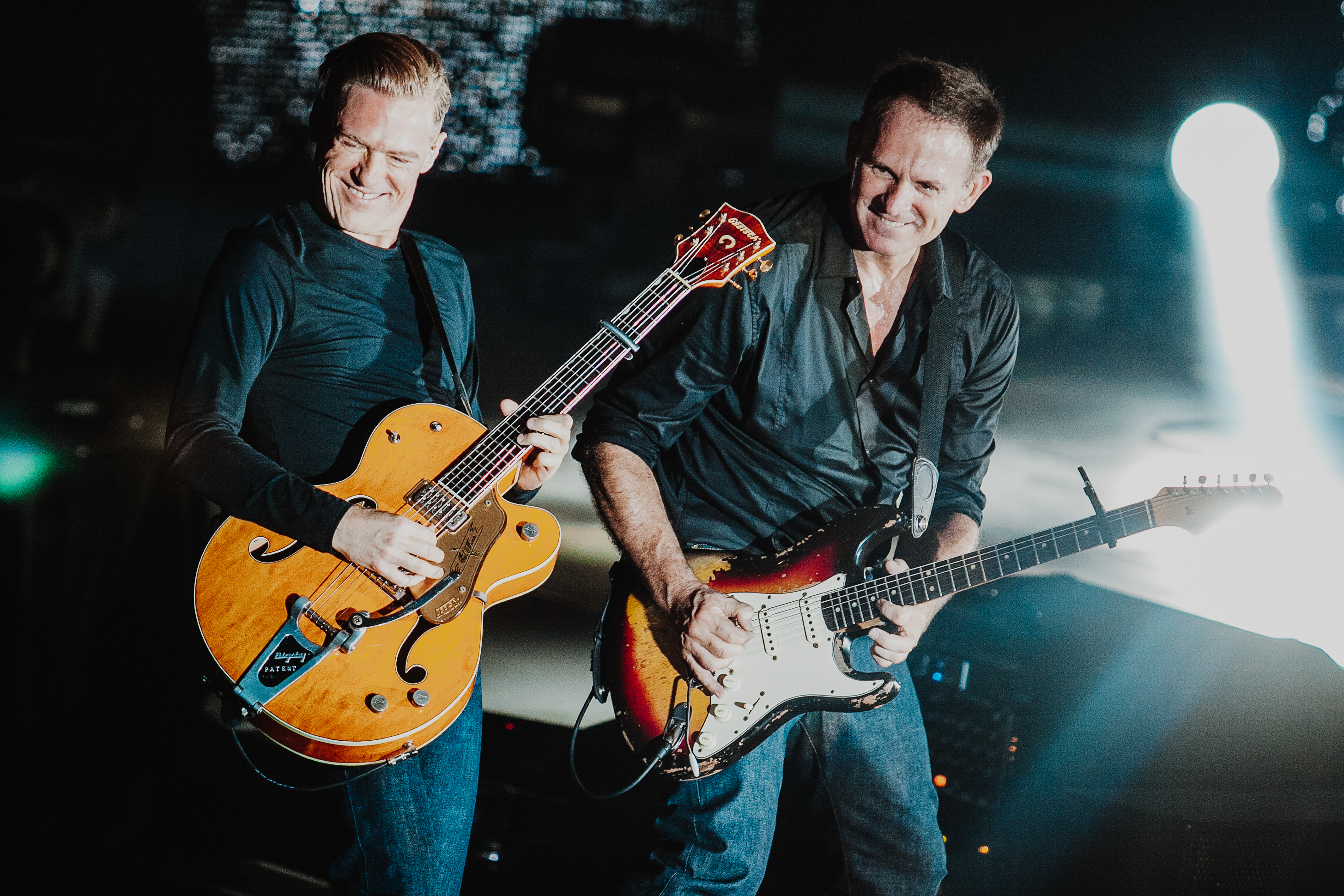
Adams and Keith Scott during a concert in 2012

In August 2013, Live at Sydney Opera House was released on CD / DVD set or separately as a CD, DVD or Blu-ray; it was recorded during one of the 3 nights at Sydney Opera House, in August 2011, during "The Bare Bones Tour".

In April 2013, Adams and Michael Bublé released "After All", a duet co-written by Adams with Alan Chang, Steven Sater, and Jim Vallance.

In 2014, Adams signed a recording contract with Verve Records and in September, he released Tracks of My Years, an album of cover versions celebrating the 30th Anniversary of Reckless. The album reached number one on the Canadian album chart. The album contains cover songs and one original song co-written with Jim Vallance.

In July 2014, Adams filmed Bryan Adams in Concert for Great Performances on PBS. It was recorded at the Elgin and Winter Garden Theatres in Toronto and first aired on March 2, 2015.

Adams released his first album of all new material in seven years on October 16, 2015. The album, titled Get Up, was co-written with Jim Vallance and produced by Jeff Lynne.

Adams performed at the 2015 AFL Grand Final, along with Ellie Goulding and Chris Isaak.

On December 31, 2015, he performed at the Central Hall Westminster in London for the BBC's New Year's Eve, which was broadcast live on BBC One.

On October 14, 2016, Adams released the Wembley 1996 DVD, the recording of his concert, as part of the 18 Til I die tour, held on July 27, 1996, at London's Wembley Stadium, in front of over 70,000 spectators. The DVD immediately ranked to the top of the British music video charts.

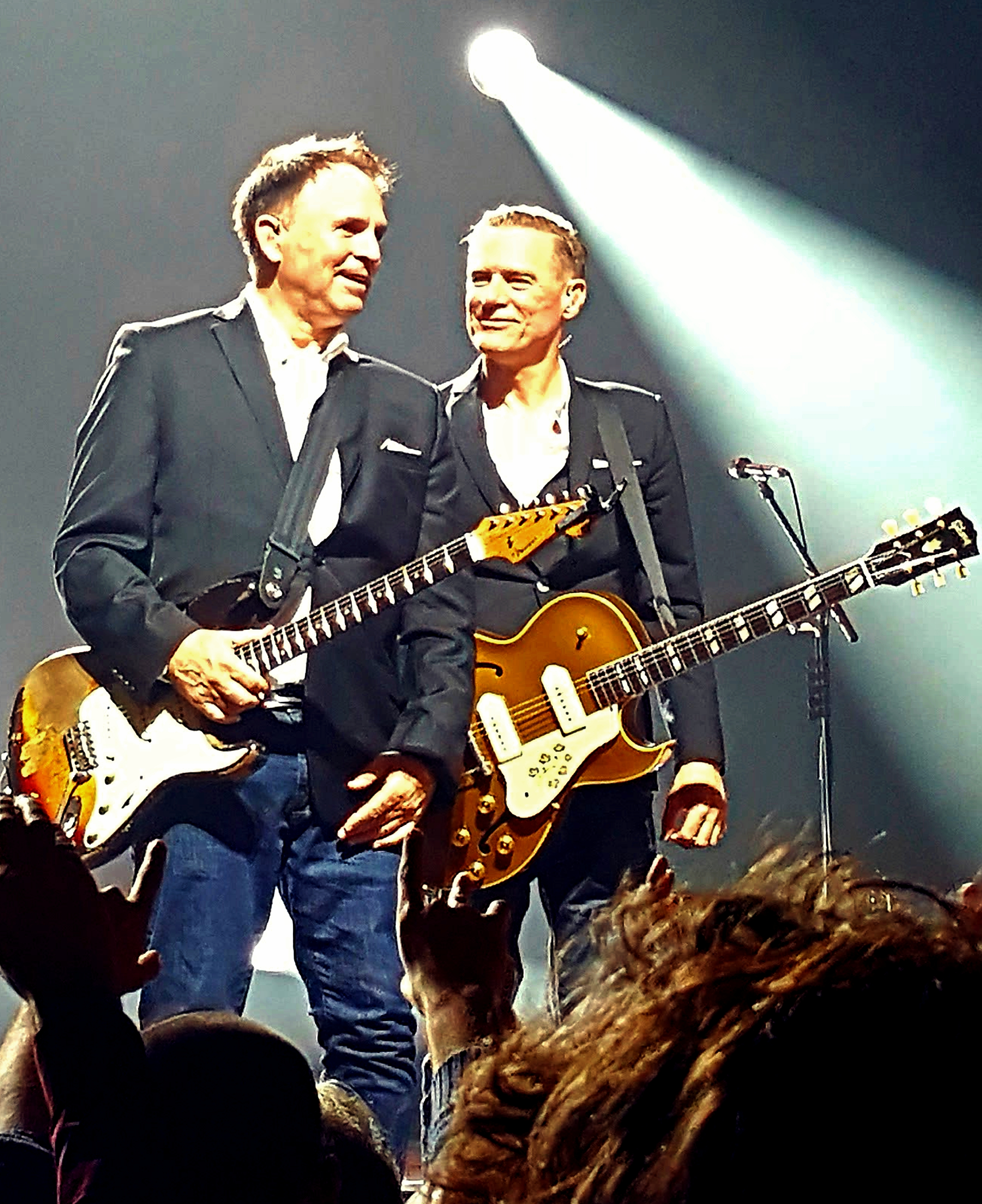
Adams with longtime guitarist Keith Scott in 2017

In November 2017, Ultimate, a compilation album with two new songs "Please Stay" and the anti-war themed "Ultimate Love", was released.

In 2018, Bryan Adams performed "the Ultimate tour", touring Australia, New Zealand, UK, Europe, India, the U.S., and Canada.

Adams first approached Disney in 2009 to discuss writing the music for a possible Broadway theatre adaptation of Pretty Woman. In 2016, when he found out that it was in production, he interviewed for the songwriter position with Jim Vallance and got the job. He worked with producer Paula Wagner and director Jerry Mitchell, spending the next two years writing the music and lyrics, completing the songs in March 2018. Pretty Woman: The Musical made its debut on Broadway in August 2018 and opened in London's West End theatre in February 2020.

In August 2018, Adams performed a duet version of "Summer of '69" with Taylor Swift during her Reputation Tour in Toronto, Canada. Adams released his fourteenth album Shine a Light on March 1, 2019. The album features collaborations with Ed Sheeran and Jennifer Lopez. The album debuted at number one on the Canadian Albums Chart, in the first week of its release, with 44,000 copies sold; its previous number one in Canada going back to the Tracks of My Years album released in October 2014. This was his 11th album in the top ten and the fifth album at the top of the Canadian charts. It reached the second position in the UK Albums Chart, and it was his tenth album to enter the UK Top-10 albums chart. It also debuted in second position in Switzerland, which was his 15th album to enter the top ten of the Swiss charts; second position in Austria; second position in the New Zealand charts; and the third position in Germany. Shine a Light was certified gold in Canada, and it won the Juno Award for "Best Adult Contemporary Album" in 2020. On June 19, 2020, on the 155th anniversary of the end of Slavery in the United States, the unreleased solo version of "Never Gonna Break My Faith" by Aretha Franklin was released with the participation of RCA Records, RCA Inspiration and Legacy Recordings, featuring a music video that contained contemporary topics, including films about George Floyd and the Black Lives Matter movement.

Adams, while writing this song, did not think it would be performed by Aretha. He conceived something like a hymn and "so that it can express a sense of faith, and that even if you have lost something, there will always be an inner light to guide you." However, then Adams said:

"When the song was ready, I told the producers that Aretha was going to sing it – and she did. This solo version had been on my computer for years (about 15 years), and when I heard that the creative director of Sony Music, longtime producer and friend of Aretha's Clive Davis, was making a movie about his life, I sent him this version. The world hadn't heard her full performance yet and it really needed to be heard. I'm so glad it's being released, the world needs this right now."

Adams was among hundreds of artists whose material was destroyed in the 2008 Universal fire. Adams told the Times that he had asked Universal for access to the master tapes for Reckless in 2013 while working on a remastered edition of the album, but had been told that the tapes could not be found. Adams eventually located a safety copy of the album to use on the remaster, and was not made aware of the fire until the Times' initial report on June 1. On November 15, 2019, Adams released an EP dedicated to Christmas. The Christmas EP contains five tracks, the new track "Joe and Mary" and three previously released tracks: "Christmas Time", "Reggae Christmas" and "Merry Christmas"; and a new interpretation of "Must Be Santa", a 1960s Christmas song, performed in 2009 by Bob Dylan. At the end of November 2019, the album The Christmas Present by the British singer-songwriter Robbie Williams is released, Adams participates in the duet with Williams in the song Christmas (Baby Please Come Home).

=== 2020s ===
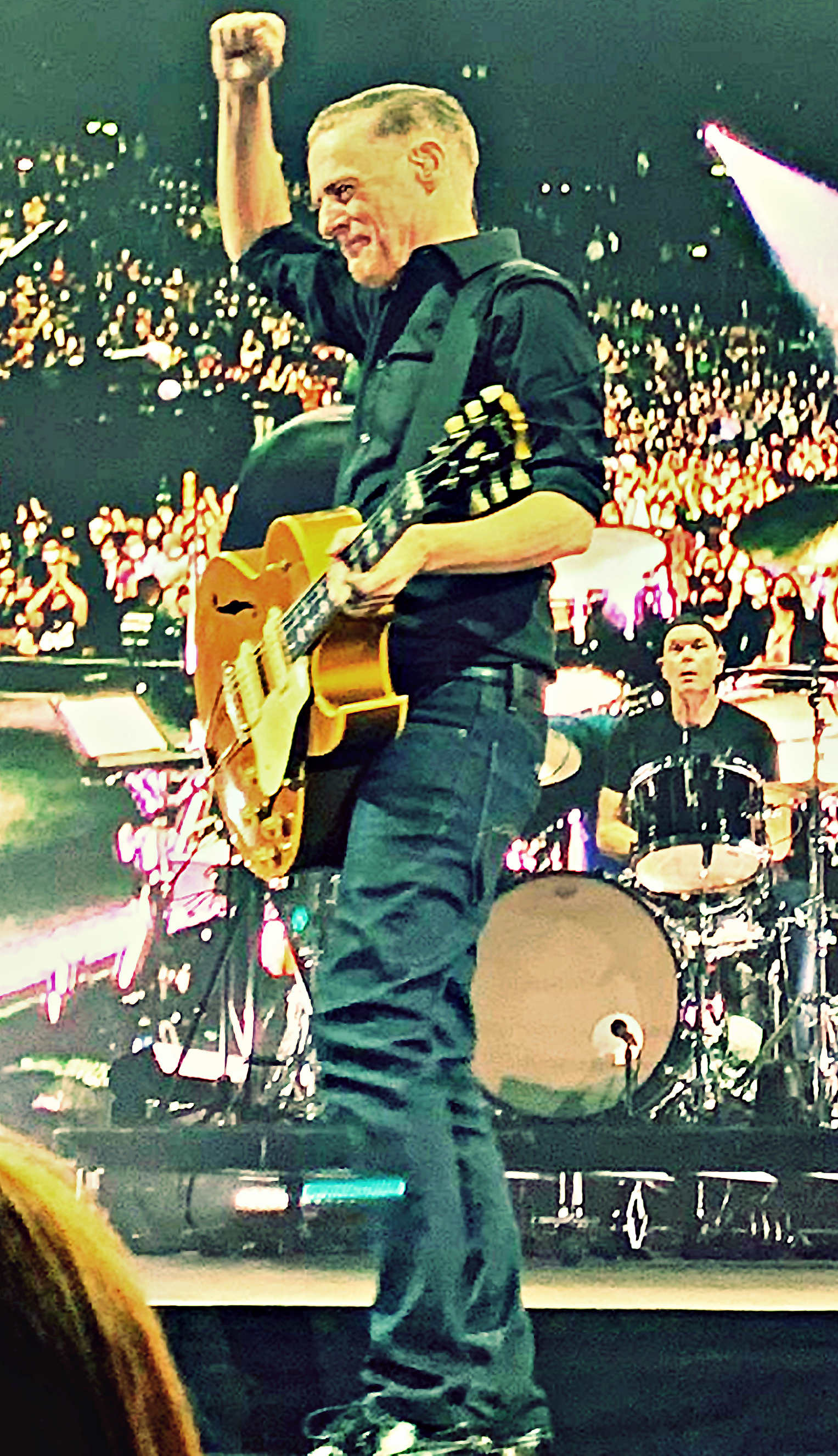
Adams performing in 2022

On November 13, 2020, Adams was featured on "Stop Crying Your Heart Out" as part of the BBC Radio 2's Allstars' Children in Need charity single. The single debuted at number seven on the Official UK Singles Chart and number one on both the Official UK Singles Sales Chart and the Official UK Singles Download Chart. On December 7, 2020, Adams announced a series of UK concerts following the long hiatus of the "Shine a Light Tour" caused by the COVID-19 pandemic and the cancellation of a sold out 17-date tour with Bon Jovi in U.S. arenas.

In July 2021, Adams signed a deal with Bertelsmann Music Group (BMG) to release his next album. On October 11, 2021, Adams released the title track of his 15th studio album, So Happy It Hurts. The album was released in March 2022. Adams also announced dates for a worldwide tour starting in February 2022. The single So Happy It Hurts from this album was nominated in the Best Rock Performance category of the 2023 Grammy Awards. Shows in late 2021 were cancelled due to the COVID-19 pandemic.

In 2022, via YouTube, Adams released new versions of the 16 songs of Pretty Woman: The Musical sung by Adams himself. The songs were co-written by Adams and Jim Vallance for the musical in October 2018. On April 1, 2022, Adams released Classic, an album of reworked and reimagined hits. This was followed on July 29, 2022, with Classic Pt II.

In December 2023, Adams split with his manager of 44 years, Bruce Allen, instead choosing to self-manage his career.

In August 2024, Adams launched his own record label, called Bad Records and released a double A-side single "War Machine"/"Rock and Roll Hell". In November 2024, Canadian media conglomerate Bell Media announced several partnerships with Adams, including an internet radio channel, a syndicated radio show that will premiere in January 2025, as well as a CTV concert special featuring a performance of the Reckless album (marking its 40th anniversary) from a three-night residency at the Royal Albert Hall in May 2024.

Following the release of the Roll with the Punches album in August 2025, Adams launched the "Roll with the Punches" tour in the fall with performances throughout North America. The tour continued into 2026. Adams released his seventeenth full-length record How's It Goin'? in November of 2026.

=== Artistry ===
==== Voice and timbre ====
Adams' voice has been described as a "sandpaper tenor that's a cross between Joe Cocker and Bruce Springsteen".

==== Musical style ====
Adams has played various styles of rock, from hard rock and arena rock to pop rock and soft rock. His early songs were about kids and about the lives of young people, and he is known for his romantic ballads.

During the first few years of his career, Adams fronted Canadian glam rock band Sweeney Todd; the band played hard rock as well as glam rock.

Adams' first single, "Let Me Take You Dancing", was a disco song. The melody, a piano riff inspired by Robbie King, was composed by Jim Vallance on his parents' piano during the Christmas holidays in 1977; Adams helped turn the riff into a song.

In 1982, Vallance and Adams received a call from producer Michael James Jackson to contribute some songs for the next Kiss album. Although Vallance and Adams were not fans of heavy metal, it was a golden opportunity for exposure for their songs by a world-class rock group. In collaboration with Gene Simmons, the track "War Machine" and a rewrite "Rock 'n Roll Hell" were recorded by Kiss for the album Creatures of the Night.

Adams' first solo albums, Bryan Adams and You Want It You Got It, two clear-cut rock and hard rock albums, included the styles for which Adams would become famous. In 1983, with the release of Cuts Like a Knife, Reckless and Into the Fire, Adams' music was characterised as hard rock with melodic overtones and powerful ballads (known as power ballads).

In the 1990s, with the release of Waking Up the Neighbours in 1991, produced by Robert John "Mutt" Lange, Adams left the hard rock sound and released an album closer to classic rock and roll, taking inspiration from the sounds of bands like Def Leppard and Foreigner. In 1996, with his album 18 til I Die, Adams adopted a pop rock sound more in line with the style of the time. Many ballads were included, although it also contained some rock songs such as "18 til I Die" and "The Only Thing That Looks Good on Me Is You".

In the album Room Service (2004), Adams again opted for a rock-orientated sound. In 2008, with 11, Adams utilised a softer sound and included songs from the soft rock, pop rock and melodic rock genres. In 2019, with Shine a Light, he combined rock with pop rock and R&B. Adams has also incorporated a Rockabilly sound into some of his songs. The tracks "You Belong To Me" and "I've Been Looking For You" are examples of his forays into rockabilly.

==== Influences and favourite musicians ====
Among his youthful influences, Adams has often mentioned Elvis Presley and Bob Dylan as well as all the pop and rock he heard as a boy on the radio. His main sources of inspiration also include guitarists, besides Blackmore, he was influenced by guitarists such as Jimmy Page, Eric Clapton, Mick Ronson, Jeff Beck, Peter Frampton and Eddie Van Halen. Other influential and favourite artists were Alice Cooper, Black Sabbath, Humble Pie, Bob Marley, Bob Seger, Chuck Berry, David Bowie, Jackie Wilson, Joe Cocker, John Lennon, Led Zeppelin, Leonard Cohen, Ray Charles, Sam Cooke, The Beatles, The Who, The Beach Boys, The Rolling Stones and Van Morrison.

=== Impact and legacy ===
Adams achieved significant mainstream success in the 1980s with his album Reckless, which was five times multi-platinum "Album of the Year".

He is known for his powerful rock songs and romantic ballads, and his music has appeared in dozens of films both as a singer and as a songwriter and co-writer since the early 1980s, including Class, A Night in Heaven, Real Genius, Renegades, Pink Cadillac, An Innocent Man, Problem Child 2, Robin Hood: Prince of Thieves, The Cutting Edge, The Three Musketeers, Don Juan DeMarco, The Mirror Has Two Faces, Jack, Red Corner, Hope Floats, Spirit: Stallion of the Cimarron, House of Fools, Devil's Gate, Racing Stripes, Color Me Kubrick, The Guardian, Bobby, Cashback, Bridge to Terabithia, Old Dogs, Jock the Hero Dog and Legends of Oz: Dorothy's Return.

==== Success in India ====
Adams and his music are popular in India, where he is a household name for three generations of people, and many people say the first few English phrases mastered by many young Indians are "It was the summer of '69" and "Everything I do, I do it for you." Many music industry executives have said Adams is the most-known foreign music artist in India. He was one of the first foreigners to stage a large-scale concert in India in the early 1990s, and he has returned to tour India several times. Adams was on the cover of the September 2018 issue of Rolling Stone India; an article in the issue stated that Adams is "one rock legend whose concerts have created mass frenzy every single time in every single city he's played" in India. It is also reported that "Summer of '69" has been so popular in India for so long that it is "almost a Hindi song now", often the only "western" song that might be allowed to be played at a traditional Indian wedding. Adams toured India six times between 1994 and 2024 and has called himself an indophile.

== Activism and humanitarian work ==
=== Humanitarian work ===
Most of Adams's philanthropic activity is through The Bryan Adams Foundation, which "aims to improve the quality of people's lives around the world by providing financial grants to support specific projects that are committed to bettering the lives of other people". The foundation is mostly funded by Adams himself.

=== Benefit concerts and humanitarian awards ===
Adams has participated in concerts and other activities to help raise money and awareness for a variety of causes. His first high-profile charity appearance came in 1985 when he opened the U.S. transmission of Live Aid from Philadelphia. In June 1986, Adams participated in the two-week Amnesty International "A Conspiracy of Hope" tour alongside Sting, U2 and Peter Gabriel. In 1986, Adams performed at The Prince's Trust All-Star Rock Concert in Wembley Arena to celebrate first 10 years of the Trust and again in June 1987 at the 5th Annual Prince's Trust Rock Gala along with Elton John, George Harrison, Ringo Starr and others.

On June 11, 1988, Adams performed at the Nelson Mandela birthday party concert at Wembley Stadium. In June 1988, Adams and Joe Cocker played in Weißensee in front of a crowd of over 85,000 people.

In March 1989, Adams performed on the Greenpeace album Rainbow Warriors, which was also released in the Soviet Union on the Melodiya label. According to Greenpeace, worldwide sales raised more than $8 million for Greenpeace initiatives.

In July 1989, Adams committed to work on another charity record: the remake of the Deep Purple classic "Smoke on the Water" for Rock Aid Armenia to obtain funds for the 1988 Armenian earthquake.

Adams helped commemorate the fall of the Berlin Wall when, in 1990, he joined many other guests, including his songwriting partner Michael Kamen, for Roger Waters' The Wall – Live in Berlin, in which he performed several Pink Floyd songs alongside artists including Joni Mitchell, Cyndi Lauper, Van Morrison, and Paul Carrack.

On March 2, 1993, Adams performed alongside artists including Tina Turner, James Taylor, George Michael, Tom Jones and Dustin Hoffman at that year's edition of Rock for the Rainforest, a benefit concert at Carnegie Hall hosted by Sting and his wife Trudie Styler to benefit the Rainforest Foundation Fund. It raised $800,000 for indigenous rights.

On April 24, 1993, he participated in the benefit concert Farm Aid at the Jack Trice Stadium in Ames.

On December 10, 1997, Adams took part in a concert called "A Gift of Song", in celebration of the U.S. Committee for UNICEF 50th Anniversary, held at the Z-100 Jingle Ball Madison Square Garden in New York City.

On January 29, 2005, Adams was one of 150 performers at "Canada for Asia", a CBC benefit concert in Toronto for victims of the 2004 Indian Ocean earthquake; the concert raised $4 million.

In July 2005, Adams played at Live 8 concert, Barrie, Ontario, to raise awareness about poverty.

In September 2005, he performed in Qatar to benefit "Reach Out To Asia" benefiting the underprovided in Asia and those affected by the 2004 Indian Ocean earthquake. Adams organized a charity auction of a white Fender Stratocaster guitar signed by himself as well as other prominent guitarists including Mick Jagger, Keith Richards, Eric Clapton, Brian May, Jeff Beck, Pete Townshend, Liam Gallagher, and Noel Gallagher. The guitar raised US$2.8 million, also benefiting "Reach Out To Asia", and thus set a record as the world's costliest guitar.

Through the Rock by the River concert, held on May 25, 2005, Adams raised £1.3m with cousin Johnny Armitage, for the Royal Marsden Hospital in London.

In June 2008, he offered individuals from the public the chance to bid to sing with him live in concert at three different charity auctions in London. Over £50,000 was raised with money going to the NSPCC, Children in Need, and the University College Hospital. On February 28, 2008, he appeared in One Night Live at the Air Canada Centre in Toronto with Josh Groban, Sarah McLachlan, Jann Arden, and RyanDan in aid of the Sunnybrook Hospital Women and Babies Program.

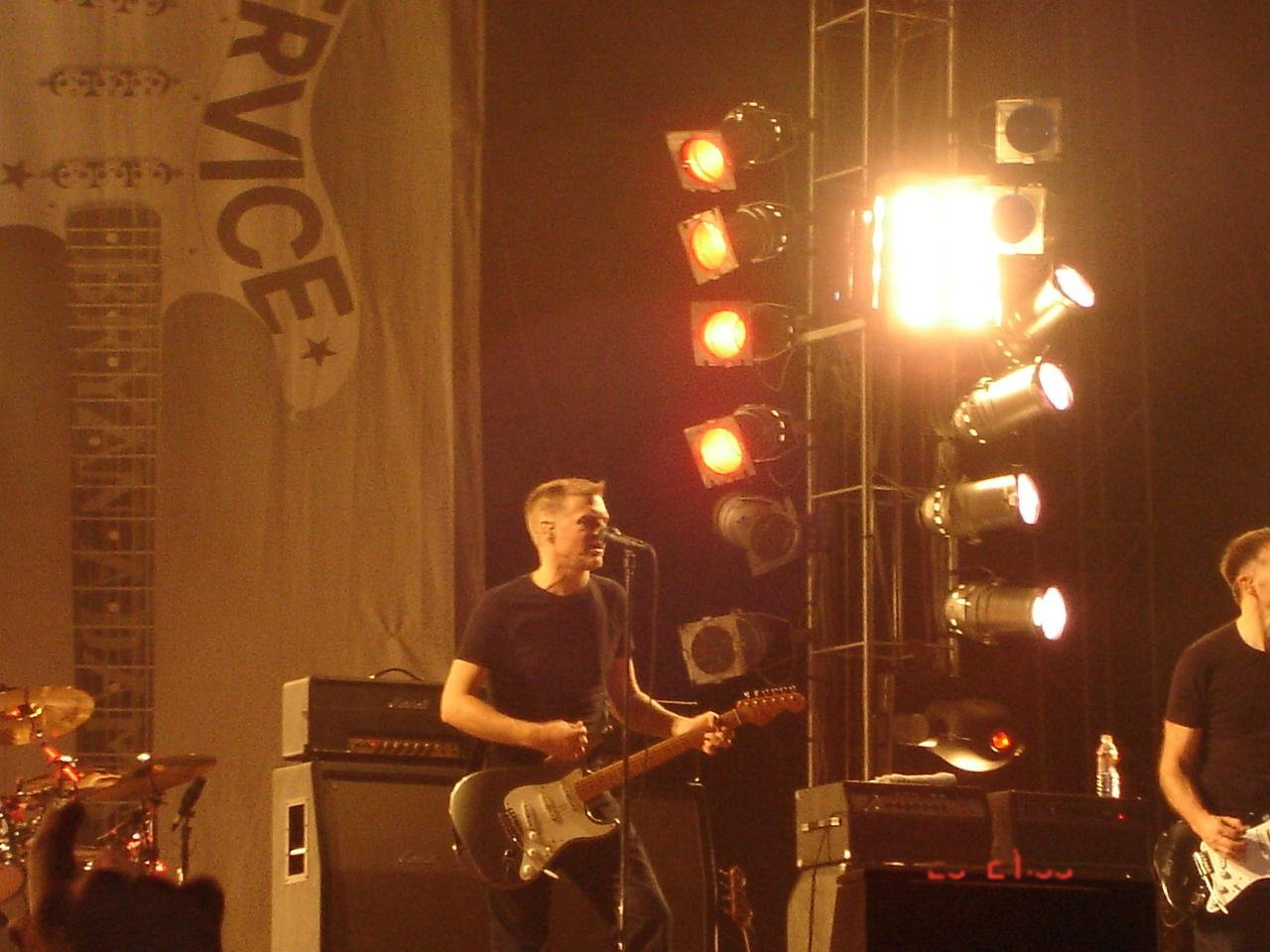
Adams in 2006

On January 29, 2006, Adams became the first Western artist to perform in Karachi, Pakistan after the September 11th attacks in conjunction with a benefit concert by Shehzad Roy to raise money for underprivileged children to go to school and to support victims of the 2005 Pakistan earthquake.

On October 18, 2007, Adams was scheduled to perform in Tel Aviv and Jericho as part of the OneVoice Movement concerts, hoping to aid in solving the Israeli–Palestinian conflict; however, the concerts were cancelled due to security concerns.

On January 13, 2010, he received the Allan Waters Humanitarian Award for participating in numerous concerts and charity campaigns.

On January 13, 2011, he participated in the Concert for Killing Cancer at the Hammersmith Apollo in London together with the historic rock band The Who, Jeff Beck, Debbie Harry, and Richard Ashcroft. On October 22, 2013, he attended the TJ Martell Foundation's 38th Annual Honors Gala in New York City for Cancer Research. He performed alongside Sting.

On September 14, 2014, Adams was the first artist to sing at the Invictus Games organised by Prince Harry in East London. Prince Harry reciprocated by attending Adams's exhibition on wounded soldiers in London.

In May 2015, he received the "Allan Slaight Humanitarian Spirit Award" in recognition of his social activism and support for various humanitarian causes, presented during Canadian Music Week at the Canadian Music Industry & Broadcast Awards Gala. In 2016, Adams canceled an April 14 concert at Mississippi Coast Coliseum in Biloxi. From July 1, the state implemented the Religious Liberty Accommodations Act, whereby religious groups and private companies can refuse to provide their services to same-sex couples; after the example of Bruce Springsteen, who canceled his show in Greensboro, North Carolina in protest against the Public Facilities Privacy & Security Act requiring transgender people to use public restrooms reflecting the sex listed on their birth certificate, Adams also followed "the Boss".

On September 30, 2017, Adams, along with Bruce Springsteen, met on stage at the 2017 Invictus Games. The Paralympic Games for Military Veterans, now in its third edition, saw the two artists perform for the closing ceremony at the Scotiabank Arena in Toronto. They performed some pieces of their repertoire, to close in duet performing "Cuts Like A Knife" and "Badlands".

In November 2019, Adams gifted Park Walk Primary School in Chelsea, England, with a new playground through his charity The Bryan Adams Foundation. In previous years, Adams had built a playground for Ashburnham Community School in the Royal Borough of Kensington and Chelsea in London with his foundation.

For his Shine a Light world tour in 2019, Adams teamed up with shipping company DHL for an environmental project to plant a tree for every ticket sold during the course of the tour. In April 2020, he participates in the recording of the song "Lean on Me" together with an ad hoc supergroup of Canadian musicians accredited as ArtistsCAN, both in homage to the recent death of Bill Withers and for raise money for the Canadian Red Cross during the COVID-19 pandemic.

In November 2020, Adams participated with other artists in the song "Stop Crying Your Heart Out", proposed in a cover performed for the charitable cause of Children in Need under the supervision of BBC Radio 2.

=== Animal rights activism ===
During his tours of 1992–1994, Adams successfully campaigned for the Southern Ocean Whale Sanctuary with Greenpeace Chairman David McTaggart; the sanctuary was created by the International Whaling Commission in 1994.

On November 10, 2002, Adams participated in the benefit concert at the Royal Opera House in London for the Dian Fossey Gorilla Fund International. He played "Run to You" and "Crazy Little Thing Called Love" with Brian May.

In April 2019, while off the coast of St. Vincent and the Grenadines, Adams physically intervened to protect a whale from being killed when local whalers tried to harpoon it within a conservation zone.

Adams is the founder of the St. Vincent and the Grenadines Environment Fund, a non-profit company registered in Saint Vincent and the Grenadines to support sustainable initiatives to promote the preservation of the beauty and natural value of the islands.

In May 2020, Adams was criticized for a profane social media post blaming the COVID-19 pandemic on "fucking bat eating, wet market animal selling, virus making greedy bastards". Even though Adams did not single out any particular race in his remarks, online response was immediate and "Bryan Adams racist" began trending on social media. Adams later apologized for the comments stating, "To any and all that took offence...No excuse, I just wanted to have a rant about the horrible animal cruelty in these wet-markets being the possible source of the virus, and promote veganism. I have love for all people and my thoughts are with everyone dealing with this pandemic around the world."

=== Pro-Canada messaging ===
In 2026, Adams released several songs which were responses to American President Donald Trump's statements and Executive Orders regarding Canada. Released on Canada Day, July 1, 2026, the song 51st State, rejected the idea that Canada would become the U.S.' "51st state." Another song, Lake Ontario, released October 28, 2026, six days before the American Mid-term elections, pushed back on the American President's Executive Order renaming Lake Ontario to "Lake America" in August. The idea of renaming the lake, whose Iroquoian name predated the founding of both countries, was uniformly disapproved of by Canadians, and most Americans, and of which Canadian Prime Minister Mark Carney said would remain named "Lake Ontario – then, now and always."

== Photography ==
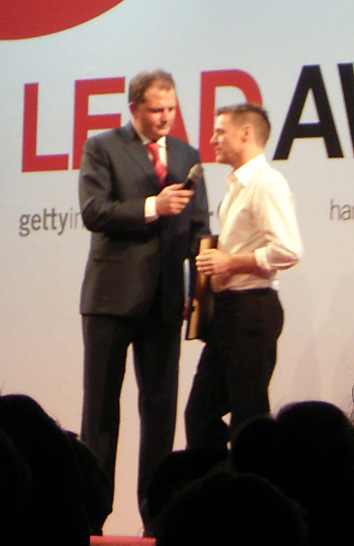
Adams accepting a Lead Award for photography in 2006

Adams also works as a photographer. In 2002, Adams was invited, along with other photographers from the Commonwealth, to photograph Queen Elizabeth II during her Golden Jubilee; one of the photographs from this session was used as a Canadian postage stamp in 2004 and again in 2005 (see Queen Elizabeth II domestic rate stamp (Canada)), another portrait of both Queen Elizabeth II and Prince Philip is now in the National Portrait Gallery in London.

He won three Lead Awards in Germany for his fashion photography, most recently in October 2015 for his story in Helmut Berger, and previously in June 2012 and again in 2006. He founded the art fashion Zoo Magazine, based in Berlin, for which he shoots regularly.

His first retrospective book of photos was released by Steidl in October 2012 titled Exposed. Previous published collaborations include American Women (2005), for Calvin Klein in the United States; proceeds from this book went to Memorial Sloan Kettering Cancer Center in New York City for their breast cancer research programs, and Made in Canada (1999) for Flare Magazine in Canada; proceeds went to the Canadian Breast Cancer Foundation. Both books were dedicated to his friend Donna, who died of the disease.

Adams supports the Hear the World initiative as a photographer in its aim to raise global awareness for the topic of hearing and hearing loss. Adams released a photography book entitled Wounded – The Legacy of War (2013) to highlight the human consequences of war.

On September 16, 2015, he was given an Honorary Fellowship of the Royal Photographic Society in London for his work in photography. Adams has been published in British Vogue, L'uomo Vogue, American Vanity Fair, Harper's Bazaar, British GQ, Esquire, Interview magazine and i-D, and shot advertising and PR campaigns for Hugo Boss, Guess Jeans, Sand, Converse, Montblanc, John Richmond, Fred Perry, Escada, Gaastra, Zeiss, Joop, Zeiss AG, Schwarzkopf, Ermenegildo Zegna, AGL shoes, Windsor, Jaguar and OPEL cars.

In the summer of 2021, he shot the 48th edition of Pirelli Calendar in two working days in June in Los Angeles, where most of the cast met, followed by a day of work at Capri at the end of July. He photographed Iggy Pop, Rita Ora, Cher, Grimes, Normani, Kali Uchis, Jennifer Hudson, Saweetie, St. Vincent and Bohan Phoenix.

Adams has also photographed many of his colleagues in the music business. Other album covers featuring work by Adams include those for:

- Annie Lennox – The Annie Lennox Collection
- Amy Winehouse – Lioness: Hidden Treasures
- Status Quo – Aquostic (Stripped Bare)
- Rammstein – Zeit

=== Books ===
- Made in Canada (1999)
- American Women (2005)
- Exposed (Steidl, 2012)
- Wounded – The Legacy of War (Steidl, 2013)
- Untitled (Steidl, 2015)
- Canadians (Steidl, 2017)
- Homeless (Steidl, 2019)
- Hear The World (Steidl, 2024)

=== Exhibitions ===
- Royal Ontario Museum, Toronto 1999
- McCord Museum, Montréal 2000
- Fotografija Galerija, Ljubljana, Slovenia, November 2006
- Nunnington Hall, North Yorkshire, England, May–June 2007
- 401 projects, New York City, September–November 2007
- National Portrait Gallery, London, February–May 2008
- Haus Der Kunst, Munich, May 2008
- 14th Street Gallery, Hear the World Ambassadors Photo Exhibition, New York City, May 2008
- Saatchi Gallery, Hear The World Ambassadors, London, July 2009
- Calvin Klein American women 2010, New York, September 2010
- Multimedia Art Museum, Moscow, July 2012 (Exposed)
- Goss-Michael Gallery, Dallas, Texas. "Bryan Adams – Exposed" December 2012 February 2013
- Oklahoma Contemporary, Oklahoma City. "Bryan Adams – Exposed" February – May 2013
- NRW-Forum, Düsseldorf, Germany. "Bryan Adams – Exposed" February – May 2013
- Marfa Contemporary, Marfa, Texas. "Bryan Adams – Exposed" May – August 2013
- Ostlicht Galerie, Vienna, Austria. "Bryan Adams – Exposed" June – September 2013
- Akira Ikeda Gallery, Berlin, Germany. "Bryan Adams – Exposed" September – November 2013
- Glenbow Museum, Calgary, Canada. "Bryan Adams – Exposed" February – May 2014
- Westlicht Gallery, Vienna, Austria. "Bryan Adams – Exposed"
- Stadtgalerie, Klagenfurt, Austria. "Bryan Adams – Exposed" July October 3–5, 2014: "Bryan Adams – Exposed"
- Stadthaus Ulm, Germany. "Bryan Adams – Exposed" June – September 2014
- MNBAQ, Quebec City, Canada. "Bryan Adams s'expose" February June 19–14, 2015
- Somerset House, London, England. "Bryan Adams – Wounded: The Legacy of War" November 2014 – January 2015
- Centro Cultural, Cascais, Portugal. "Bryan Adams – Exposed" October 2014 – February 2015
- Young Gallery, Brussels, Belgium. "Bryan Adams – Exposed" September 11, November 28, 2015
- Center of Contemporary Art Znaki Czasu,Toruń, Poland. "Bryan Adams – Exposed" November 2015 – January 2016
- Fotografiska, Stockholm, Sweden. "Bryan Adams – Exposed" June 18, 2016 – September 25, 2016
- Vivacom Art Hall, Sofia, Bulgaria. "Bryan Adams – Exposed" October November 11–12, 2016
- Werkhallen, Bonn, Germany. "Bryan Adams – Exposed" February May 19–20, 2017
- Royal Ontario Museum, Toronto. "Canadians" 2017
- Embassy of Canada, Washington. "Canadians" 2017
- Photo Gallery, Halmstad, Sweden. "Bryan Adams – Exposed" January April 20–30, 2018
- Camera Work Gallery, Berlin, Germany. "Bryan Adams – Exposed" December 8, 2018 – February 9, 2019
- Izzy Gallery, Toronto, Canada. "Bryan Adams – Exposed" July 2–28, 2019
- Fotografiska, Tallinn, Estonia. "Bryan Adams – Exposed" March September 6–20, 2020
- Gericke + Paffrath Gallery, Düsseldorf, Germany. "Bryan Adams – Exposed" October January 2–31, 2021
- Leica Gallery, Munich, Germany. "Bryan Adams – Exposed" October January 29–31, 2021
- Atlas Gallery, London, United Kingdom. "Bryan Adams – Homeless" April June 29–12, 2021
- IPFO House of Photography, Olten, Switzerland. "Bryan Adams – Exposed" November 18, 2021 – February 6, 2022
- Osthaus-Museum Hagen, Hagen, Germany. "Bryan Adams – Exposed" February April 20–10, 2022
- Leica Galerie, Milan, Italy. "Bryan Adams – Exposed" April July 21–9, 2022
- Atlas Gallery, London, "Bryan Adams In Colour", June 22 – August 31, 2023
- Leica Gallery, London, "Bryan Adams Classics", June 22 – August 31, 2023
- Galerie Camera Work, Berlin, "Bryan Adams In Colour", October 14 – November 18, 2023
- Günter Grass-Haus, Lübeck, "Bryan Adams Exposed/Wounded", October 15, 2023 – January 7, 2024
- Sala Magna of Pueblo Español, Palma de Mallorca, "Bryan Adams In Colour", December 21, 2023 – April 14, 2024
- War Memorial of Korea, Seoul, "Bryan Adams Exposed/Wounded", January 12 – April 14, 2024
- Ernst Leitz Museum, Wetzlar, "Bryan Adams Exposed", June 26 – September 22, 2024
- Geuer & Geuer Art, Düsseldorf, "Bryan Adams Exposed", October 5–28, 2024
- Kunsthuis, Amsterdam, "Bryan Adams Exposed", November 9 - December 8, 2024
- Fotografiska, Tallinn, Estonia. "Photography in Power" (group exhibition) May 9–September 13, 2026

== Personal life ==
Adams has never married. From 1990 to 2002, he was in a relationship with Danish model Cecilie Thomsen. Thomsen said that Adams had an affair with Diana, Princess of Wales; Adams insists they were just friends.

Adams and former personal assistant, Alicia Grimaldi, had their first daughter in April 2011 and their second daughter in February 2013.

Adams became a vegan in 1989, when he was 29 years old, and said that he has more energy as a result of the decision. According to Adams, his motto is "If you love animals, don't eat them."

On July 20, 2023, Adams was announced as co-founder of Scottish based music start up SongBox, a web application that allows musicians and other audio content creators to securely store and share their files with anyone they choose.

== Awards and honours ==
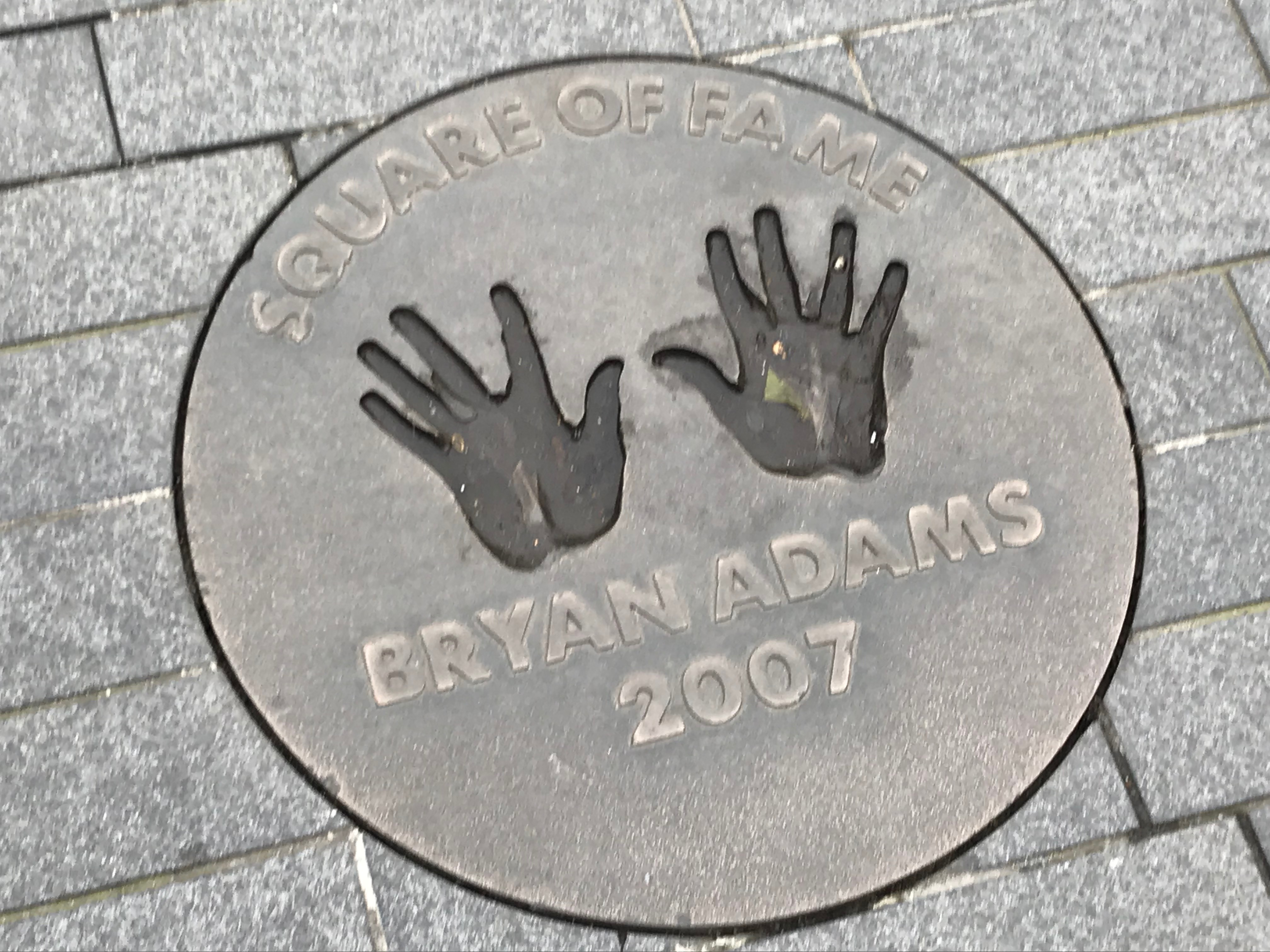
Adams' handprints at Wembley Square of Fame

Adams's awards and nominations include 20 Juno Awards among 56 nominations and 15 Grammy Award nominations, including a win for Best Song Written Specifically for a Motion Picture or Television in 1992. For his songwriting for films, Adams has been nominated for three times for Academy Awards and five Golden Globe Awards. He was nominated for his fifth Golden Globe in 2007 for songwriting for the film Bobby; the song was performed by Aretha Franklin and Mary J. Blige.

In 1990, Adams was awarded the Order of British Columbia. On April 20, 1990, Adams was made a Member of the Order of Canada, and on May 6, 1998, was promoted within the order to the rank of Officer of the Order of Canada. He received these awards for his contributions to popular music and philanthropic work via his foundation, which helps improve education for people around the world.

On May 1, 2010, Adams received the Governor General's Performing Arts Award for his 30 years of contributions to the arts. On January 13, 2010, he received the Allan Waters Humanitarian Award for his part in numerous charitable concerts and campaigns during his career.

Adams has been inducted into the Hollywood Walk of Fame, Canada's Walk of Fame, the Canadian Broadcast Hall of Fame, and the Canadian Music Hall of Fame. Adams is also a recipient of the Queen's Golden Jubilee Medal (2002) and the Queen's Diamond Jubilee Medal (2012). In 2015, he was awarded an Honorary Fellowship by the Royal Photographic Society (FRPS). In 2023, Adams was nominated for induction into the Songwriters Hall of Fame.

== Discography ==
- Bryan Adams (1980)
- You Want It You Got It (1981)
- Cuts Like a Knife (1983)
- Reckless (1984)
- Into the Fire (1987)
- Waking Up the Neighbours (1991)
- 18 til I Die (1996)
- On a Day Like Today (1998)
- Spirit: Stallion of the Cimarron (2002)
- Room Service (2004)
- 11 (2008)
- Tracks of My Years (2014)
- Get Up (2015)
- Shine a Light (2019)
- So Happy It Hurts (2022)
- Roll with the Punches (2025)
- How's It Goin' (2026)

== Concert tours ==
- You Want It You Got It Tour (1981–1982) (includes some dates with the Kinks and Loverboy)
- Cuts Like a Knife Tour (1983–1984) (includes some dates with Journey and the Police)
- Reckless Tour (1984–1985) (includes some dates with Tina Turner)
- A Conspiracy of Hope (1986) (includes some dates with U2, Sting, Peter Gabriel, Lou Reed, Joan Baez, and the Neville Brothers)
- Into the Fire Tour (1987–1988)
- Waking Up the World Tour (1991–1993) (includes some dates in Europe with ZZ Top for the Recycler Tour)
- So Far So Good Tour (1993–1994) (includes some dates in the United States with the Rolling Stones for the Voodoo Lounge Tour)
- 18 Til I Die Tour (1996–1997)
- Unplugged Tour (1997–1998)
- White Elephant Tour (1999) (includes some dates in North America with the Rolling Stones for the No Security Tour)
- The Best of Me Tour (1999–2001)
- Here I Am Tour (2002–2004)
- Room Service Tour (2004–2006) (includes 26 dates in the United States with Def Leppard)
- Anthology Tour (2007–2008)
- 11 Tour / Acoustic Show (2008–2009) (includes some dates in the United States with Foreigner and Rod Stewart)
- The Bare Bones Tour (2010–2014, 2022, 2025–) (includes some dates for the Waking Up the Neighbors 20th Anniversary Tour)
- Reckless 30th Anniversary Tour (2014–2015)
- Get Up Tour (2016–2018)
- Ultimate Tour (2018)
- Shine a Light Tour (2019–2021) (includes some 2019 dates in the United States with Billy Idol)
- So Happy It Hurts Tour (2022–2025) (includes some 2023 dates in the United States with Soul Asylum and Joan Jett and the Blackhearts; some 2024 dates in the U.S. with Dave Stewart and 2025 dates in New Zealand and Australia with James Arthur.)
- Roll With the Punches Tour (2025–) (includes 2025 dates in Canada with The Sheepdogs, 2026 dates with Lights, 2025 and '26 dates in the U.S. with Pat Benatar & Neil Giraldo, and 2027 dates in New Zealand and Australia with Natalie Imbruglia.)

== Band members ==
- Bryan Adams – lead vocals, rhythm guitar (1981–present); bass (1998–2002; 2024–present)
- Keith Scott – lead guitar, backing vocals (1981–present)
- Gary Breit – keyboards, backing vocals (2002–present)
- Pat Steward – drums, backing vocals (1984–1986; 2021–present)

== Filmography ==
=== Cinema ===
- 1989 – Pink Cadillac, directed by Buddy Van Horn, starring Clint Eastwood and Bernadette Peters, Adams plays a gas station attendant.
- 1991 – Robin Hood: Prince of Thieves Adams played himself in the full length video for "(Everything I Do) I Do It for You" playing out the end credits to the VHS release of the film.
- 2002 – House of Fools, directed by Andrei Konchalovsky, Adams plays himself and appears in the scenes in which the protagonist Zhanna (Julia Vysotskaya) dreams of marrying him.
- 2011 – Jock the Hero Dog, directed by Duncan MacNeillie. Features the voice of Adams as "Jock".
- 2013 – Legends of Oz: Dorothy's Return, directed by Daniel St. Pierre and Will Finn. Features music composed by Adams, who also had a small voice role as a beaver foreman.

=== Television ===
- 2017 – Juno Awards of 2017 the ceremonies were held at the Canadian Tire Centre in Ottawa and televised on CTV with Adams and Russell Peters as co-hosts.

== See also ==
- Music of Canada
- Rock music of Canada
- List of animal rights advocates

Preceded by Shania Twain	Grey Cup Halftime Show; 2003	Succeeded by The Tragically Hip
