= Zoo Magazine =

German photographic magazine

ZOO Magazine is based in Amsterdam, Netherlands, and was founded on the 25th of September 2003, by current Editor-In-Chief Sandor Lubbe, together with musician Bryan Adams, who remains involved to this day. ZOO is an international, high-end magazine that focuses on the world of fashion, art, and design. In all these years, ZOO Magazine has achieved international distribution, reaching as many as 26 countries. The magazine is published quarterly, with editions every season including Spring, Summer, Fall and Winter Issues. The predominantly German based subject matter has recently expanded into a more international context and the magazine is published in English.

== Photographers ==
Its support for photography has attracted some of the best fashion photographers in the world, such as Steven Klein, Donald McPherson, David La Chapelle, Terry Richardson, Nobuyoshi Araki, Hedi Slimane and Karl Lagerfeld.

== Ownership ==
ZOO Magazine is the trading name of Melon Collie C.V.. The magazine was co-founded in Berlin by Sandor Lubbe and musician Bryan Adams, who also photographs for it.
