= 18 til I Die (song) =

1996 single by Bryan Adams

Single by Bryan Adams

from the album 18 til I Die
- Released: 1996
- Length: 3:30
- Label: A&M
- Songwriters: Bryan Adams, Robert John "Mutt" Lange
- Producers: Bryan Adams, Robert John "Mutt" Lange

Bryan Adams singles chronology
"Star" (1996)	"18 til I Die" (1996)	"I Finally Found Someone" (1996)

Music video
- "18 til I Die" on YouTube

"18 til I Die" is a song written by Canadian musician Bryan Adams with Robert John "Mutt" Lange for Adams' seventh studio album, 18 til I Die (1996). Its lyrics are about maintaining youthful traits, even as one grows older. Released by A&M Records as a single in Canada in 1996 and in the United Kingdom in April 1997, it peaked at number 21 on the Canadian RPM 100 Hit Tracks chart and number 22 on the UK Singles Chart. Six songs recorded live at Adams' Wembley Stadium concert on July 27, 1996, were included as B-sides to its single release, spread out over two discs. They were later included in the album release of the concert. Adams continues to play this song at his concerts.

== Critical reception ==
Larry Flick from Billboard magazine wrote, "The title cut to Adams' sadly underappreciated current album kicks with the kind of guitar-happy rock heat that makes radio fun to listen to during the summer. Fans of the singer who still go back to oldies like 'Summer Of '69' would be wise to give this jam a listen, as it has a similar "forever young" energy and a stomping, anthemic beat. A perfect choice for car-stereo belters and closet air-guitar heroes." Another Billboard editor, Paul Verna felt "he is far less effective when he tries to sound adolescent, as he does on the title track". Daina Darzin from Cash Box stated that it "is sure to be a radio fave of yuppies everywhere".

Dominic Pride from Music & Media commented, "In this pean to puberty Adams jokes about "being 18 goin' on 55"—possibly, one suspects, without a stroke of irony. The Canadian rocker continues to deliver rock standards which radio will use into the next decade, and this one is an anthem which you can easily see Adams using as a closing number at any one of his epic gigs."

== Personnel ==
Personnel are taken from the 18 Til I Die liner notes.

- Bryan Adams – vocals, rhythm guitar, vocal solo
- Keith Scott – guitar
- Mutt Lange – guitar
- Dave Taylor – bass
- Mickey Curry – drums
- Olle Romo – percussion
- The Pointless Brothers [Bryan Adams and Mutt Lange] – backing vocals

== Charts ==
Chart (1996–1997)	Peak position
Belgium (Ultratip Bubbling Under Flanders)	7
Canada Top Singles (RPM)	21
Germany (GfK)	85
Iceland (Íslenski Listinn Topp 40)	36
Netherlands (Single Top 100)	86
Scottish Singles Sales (Official Charts)	25
UK Singles (Official Charts)	22
UK Rock & Metal (Official Charts)	2

== Release history ==
Region	Date	Format(s)	Label(s)	Ref.
Canada	1996	Radio	A&M	
United Kingdom	April 7, 1997	CD	A&M	
United States	July 8, 1997	Contemporary hit radio	A&M	
