= One World, One Flame =

- Single cover

Single by Bryan Adams
- Released: February 2010
- Genre: Rock
- Length: 2:28
- Label: Universal
- Songwriters: Bryan Adams; Jim Vallance; Gretchen Peters
- Producer: Bryan Adams

Bryan Adams singles chronology
"You've Been a Friend to Me" (2009)	"One World, One Flame" (2010)	"After All" (2013)

"One World, One Flame" is a single by Canadian rock singer Bryan Adams, co-written with Jim Vallance and Gretchen Peters, released in 2010 in Austria and Germany (See 2010 in music).

== Background ==
Bryan Adams was commissioned by the German television network ARD to write a song for the 2010 Winter Olympics. In November 2009, he collaborated with Jim Vallance to compose the song. Initially, they recorded an up-tempo rock song and sent a demo to ARD, but it was not what the network was looking for; ARD wanted an "inspirational ballad.". Following this setback, Adams and Vallance took a break from the project for a month. In the meantime Vallance was able to discover a short snippet of music he'd recorded a few years back. It was however just a simple two-bar phrase, its duration no more than 5 seconds. Seeing it as a good starting point for the second phase of development, he sent it to Adams.

With this snippet of music, Adams and Vallance started e-mailing lyrics back-and-forth, as they had done with Adams previous album, 11. Given the nature of their assignment, the lyrics needed to be olympics themed. They had problems writing the song, so Adams asked for some help from Gretchen Peters. She was able to contribute with a new set of lyrics, which according to Vallance, were able to capture the "Olympic spirit" perfectly.

== Track listing ==
No.	Title	Writer(s)	Length
1.	"One World, One Flame"	Adams; Vallance; Peters	2:28

== Chart positions ==
Chart (2010)	Peak position
Austria (Ö3 Austria Top 40)	70
Germany (GfK)	44
