= 18 til I Die =

18 Til I Die

Studio album by Bryan Adams
- Released: June 4, 1996
- Recorded: 1994–1996
- Studio: The Warehouse Studio Mobile Unit
- Genre: Rock
- Length: 51:48
- Label: A&M
- Producers: Bryan Adams; Robert John "Mutt" Lange

Bryan Adams chronology
| So Far So Good (1993) | 18 Til I Die (1996) | Unplugged (1997) |

Singles from 18 til I Die
- 1. "The Only Thing That Looks Good on Me Is You" Released: May 8, 1996; 2. "Let's Make a Night to Remember" Released: August 12, 1996; 3. "Star" Released: November 11, 1996; 4. "18 til I Die" Released: April 7, 1997 (Note: First released to Canadian radio in 1996.); 5. "I'll Always Be Right There" Released: 1997

Professional ratings
Review scores
| Source | Rating |
|---|---|
| AllMusic | 2/5 stars |
| Entertainment Weekly | B− |
| The Guardian | 2/5 stars |
| Los Angeles Times | 1.5/4 stars |
| MusicHound Rock | 2.5/5 stars |
| The Rolling Stone Album Guide | 2/5 stars |
| Smash Hits | 4/5 |
| USA Today | 1.5/4 stars |

18 til I Die is the seventh studio album by the Canadian singer-songwriter Bryan Adams. Released on June 4, 1996, by A&M Records, the album became a commercial success peaking at No. 1 in the United Kingdom and No. 2 in his home country Canada. It was recorded on different locations which included Jamaica and France. 18 til I Die includes the number-one song "Have You Ever Really Loved a Woman?", which had been released as a single and on the soundtrack to the film Don Juan DeMarco over a year prior, and five official singles: "The Only Thing That Looks Good on Me Is You" (the album's second single, released May 8), "Let's Make a Night to Remember", "Star", "18 til I Die", and "I'll Always Be Right There". Adams traveled throughout North America and Europe to promote the album after its June release, notably playing in front of over 70,000 people at Wembley Stadium in July 1996. The album performed lower than expectations in the US but it sold 5 million copies worldwide.

== Music ==
=== Recording and production ===
The album was written and recorded and produced by Adams and R.J. "Mutt" Lange in a house in Ocho Rios, Jamaica, from Winter 1994 to Summer 1995 and in two different houses in Provence, France, from Autumn 1995 to Spring 1996 using The Warehouse Studio Mobile Unit remote recording truck. Even the mix was done in a house in Provence, France, in March 1996 by Bob Clearmountain. Adams played some of these songs live before release; for example, he played "Let's Make a Night to Remember" at a soundcheck in a gig in 1993 during the So Far So Good World Tour. Adams had completed 12 songs by 1995, but felt that something was lacking in the album, and went back and recorded two new songs: "The Only Thing" and "18 til I Die". Adams then named the album 18 til I Die.

== Release ==
18 til I Die was officially released in June 1996. In the United States the album peaked at 31 on the Billboard 200 and held that position for three weeks. In Adams' native Canada, 18 til I Die reached number 4. The album was released in Australia, Europe and New Zealand in late June 1996. The album was a massive commercial success during its release in Europe, reaching number one on the UK Albums Chart, Adams' second in a row. 18 til I Die reached the top ten in the Netherlands, Belgium, Switzerland, Finland, Norway, Austria, Sweden, Germany and Australia, and was a moderate top 20 success in France.

The album was certified platinum in the United States, 18 til I Die was certified three-times platinum in Canada and Australia and two-times platinum in the UK.

18 til I Die includes the hit singles "Have You Ever Really Loved a Woman", "The Only Thing That Looks Good on Me Is You", "Let's Make a Night to Remember", "Star", and "18 til I Die", all of which had accompanying music videos. "Have You Ever Really Loved a Woman?" had been the number-one song on the US Billboard Hot 100 for five weeks when originally released in mid 1995, while "Let's Make a Night to Remember", the second single from the album to chart in the United States, peaked at 24 on the Billboard Hot 100 (and number 6 on the adult contemporary chart). The other singles became big hits in Europe. "The Only Thing That Looks Good on Me Is You" was the most successful rock song from 18 til I Die, reaching number 5 on the UK Singles Chart and number 1 on the Canadian Singles Chart. The music video for "The Only Thing That Looks Good on Me Is You" received heavy airplay on music television. In early 1997, the track "I'll Always Be Right There" became the album's final single, reaching number 3 on the U.S. Adult Contemporary chart and number 59 on the Hot 100 Airplay chart.

=== Album differences ===
On November 4, 1996, a second Australian version of 18 til I Die was released, featuring the song "I Finally Found Someone" (a duet with Barbra Streisand) in place of "You're Still Beautiful to Me" and had an alternative cover with a purple background and a different track order, while the Japanese version contained the bonus song "Hey Elvis".

== Track listing ==
All tracks are written by and produced by Bryan Adams and Robert John "Mutt" Lange, except where noted.

Standard edition
| No. | Title | Writer(s) | Length |
|---|---|---|---|
| 1. | "The Only Thing That Looks Good on Me Is You" | | 3:37 |
| 2. | "Do to You" | | 4:11 |
| 3. | "Let's Make a Night to Remember" | | 6:19 |
| 4. | "18 til I Die" | | 3:30 |
| 5. | "Star" | Adams; Lange; Michael Kamen | 3:42 |
| 6. | "(I Wanna Be) Your Underwear" | | 3:18 |
| 7. | "We're Gonna Win" | | 2:27 |
| 8. | "I Think About You" | Adams; Gretchen Peters | 3:36 |
| 9. | "I'll Always Be Right There" | Adams; Lange; Kamen | 3:17 |
| 10. | "It Ain't a Party... If You Can't Come 'Round" | | 3:47 |
| 11. | "Black Pearl" | | 4:00 |
| 12. | "You're Still Beautiful to Me" | | 5:14 |
| 13. | "Have You Ever Really Loved a Woman?" | Adams; Lange; Kamen | 4:48 |
| Total length: | | | 51:48 |

Japanese release bonus track
| No. | Title | Writer(s) | Length |
|---|---|---|---|
| 14. | "Hey Elvis" | Adams; Peters | 3:26 |
| Total length: | | | 55:09 |

2012 Japanese SHM-CD release bonus tracks
| No. | Title | Length |
|---|---|---|
| 14. | "Low Life" (From "Have You Ever Really Loved a Woman?" single) | 4:10 |
| 15. | "I Want It All" (From "The Only Thing That Looks Good on Me Is You" single) | 4:48 |
| 16. | "Hey Little Girl" (From "Let's Make a Night to Remember" single) | 4:39 |
| Total length: | | 65:32 |

Australian release (Purple cover – November 1996)
| No. | Title | Writer(s) | Length |
|---|---|---|---|
| 7. | "I Think About You" | Adams; Peters | 3:36 |
| 8. | "I'll Always Be Right There" | Adams; Eliot Kennedy | 3:17 |
| 9. | "It Ain't a Party If Ya Can't Come 'Round" | | 3:47 |
| 10. | "Black Pearl" | | 4:00 |
| 11. | "Have You Ever Really Loved a Woman?" | Adams; Lange; Kamen | 4:48 |
| 12. | "I Finally Found Someone" (with Barbra Streisand) | Adams; Lange; Streisand; Marvin Hamlisch | 3:43 |
| 13. | "We're Gonna Win" | | 2:27 |
| Total length: | | | 51:15 |

== Personnel ==
- Bryan Adams – vocals, 12-string guitar (1), wah guitar (1), harmonica (2), guitar (3, 5, 6, 7, 10), rhythm guitar (4), vocal solo (4), acoustic guitar (8, 12, 13), electric guitar (8), harmony vocals (8, 12, 13), lead guitar (11), handclaps (13)
- Olle Romo – programming, percussion (1–6, 8, 10, 11, 12), acoustic piano (2), keyboards (3, 5, 6, 10, 12), pads (8, 13), castanets (13)
- Michael Kamen – acoustic piano (5), string arrangements (9)
- Keith Scott – guitar (1, 4, 5), lead guitar (2, 3), 12-string guitar (2), 6-string bass (2), electric sitar (3), tremolo guitar (6, 11), guitar licks (8), guitar swells (8), slide guitar (10), rhythm guitar (11), acoustic guitar (12), electric guitar (12)
- Mutt Lange – guitar (1, 3–7, 10, 11), rhythm guitar (2), bass (7, 13), guitar picks (12)
- Phil Palmer – guitars (9)
- Paco de Lucia – Spanish guitar (13)
- Dave Taylor – bass (1–6, 8, 10, 11, 12)
- Mickey Curry – drums (1–8, 10–13), brushes (13)
- La Petite Orchestre De Cannes – strings (9)
  - Berthilde Dufour
  - Ezther Biro
  - Laurence Rierat
  - Malgorzata Calvayrac
  - Yannick Marcoul
  - Anne Saez
  - Elsa Benabdallah
  - Jean Marie Chavannes
  - Alice Pellegrin
  - Rachel Nativelle
  - Jérome Mege
- Edward Shearmur – orchestra director (9)
- The Pointless Brothers [Bryan Adams and Mutt Lange] – backing vocals (1, 4, 6, 10, 11)

== Production ==
- Bryan Adams – producer
- Robert John "Mutt" Lange –producer (1–7, 9–13)
- Olle Romo – engineer
- Ron Obvious – technical assistant
- Bob Clearmountain – mixing
- Bob Ludwig – mastering
- Gateway Mastering (Portland, Maine) – mastering location
- Dirk Rudolph – artwork, additional photography
- Matthew Rolston – cover photography, additional photography
- Andrew Catlin – additional photography
- Anton Corbijn – additional photography

== Charts ==
=== Weekly charts ===
| Chart (1996) | Peak position |
|---|---|
| Australian Albums (ARIA) | 2 |
| Austrian Albums (Ö3 Austria) | 2 |
| Belgian Albums (Ultratop Flanders) | 5 |
| Belgian Albums (Ultratop Wallonia) | 15 |
| Canada Top Albums/CDs (RPM) | 4 |
| Dutch Albums (Album Top 100) | 9 |
| Estonian Albums (Eesti Top 10) | 2 |
| European Albums (Music & Media) | 3 |
| Finnish Albums (Suomen virallinen lista) | 3 |
| French Albums (SNEP) | 15 |
| German Albums (Offizielle Top 100) | 4 |
| Hungarian Albums (MAHASZ) | 8 |
| New Zealand Albums (RMNZ) | 13 |
| Norwegian Albums (VG-lista) | 7 |
| Spanish Albums (AFYVE) | 4 |
| Swedish Albums (Sverigetopplistan) | 5 |
| Swiss Albums (Schweizer Hitparade) | 2 |
| UK Albums (Official Charts) | 1 |
| US Billboard 200 | 31 |

=== Year-end charts ===
| Chart (1996) | Position |
|---|---|
| Australian Albums (ARIA) | 25 |
| Austrian Albums (Ö3 Austria) | 12 |
| Dutch Albums (Album Top 100) | 56 |
| German Albums (Offizielle Top 100) | 22 |
| New Zealand Albums (RMNZ) | 46 |
| Swiss Albums (Schweizer Hitparade) | 14 |
| UK Albums (OCC) | 24 |
| US Billboard 200 | 168 |
| Chart (1997) | Position |
| Australian Albums (ARIA) | 62 |

== Certifications and sales ==
| Region | Certification | Certified units/sales |
|---|---|---|
| Australia (ARIA) | 3× Platinum | 210,000^{^} |
| Austria (IFPI Austria) | Gold | 25,000^{*} |
| Belgium (BRMA) | Gold | 25,000^{*} |
| Canada (Music Canada) | 3× Platinum | 300,000^{^} |
| Finland (Musiikkituottajat) | Gold | 23,896 |
| Germany (BVMI) | Gold | 250,000^{^} |
| Japan (RIAJ) | Platinum | 200,000^{^} |
| New Zealand (RMNZ) | Platinum | 15,000^{^} |
| Spain (Promusicae) | Gold | 50,000^{^} |
| Switzerland (IFPI Switzerland) | Platinum | 50,000^{^} |
| United Kingdom (BPI) | 2× Platinum | 600,000^{^} |
| United States (RIAA) | Platinum | 816,000 |
Summaries
| Europe (IFPI) | Platinum | 1,000,000^{*} |
| Worldwide | — | 5,000,000 |
^{*} Sales figures based on certification alone.^{^} Shipments figures based on certification alone.

== See also ==
- Wembley 1996
