= Star (Bryan Adams song) =

1996 single by Bryan Adams

Single by Bryan Adams

from the album 18 til I Die
- Released: November 11, 1996
- Length: 3:42
- Label: A&M
- Songwriters: Bryan Adams, Robert John "Mutt" Lange, Michael Kamen
- Producers: Bryan Adams, Robert John "Mutt" Lange

Bryan Adams singles chronology
"Let's Make a Night to Remember" (1996)	"Star" (1996)	"18 til I Die" (1997)

"Star" is a song co-written and performed by Canadian rock singer Bryan Adams. It was released in November 1996 as the third single from the album, 18 til I Die (1996). It was the theme song for the 1996 film Jack.

== Track listings ==
UK limited-edition gatefold CD single

No.	Title	Length
1.	"Star" (single version)	3:44
2.	"The Only Thing That Looks Good on Me Is You" (live)	5:11
3.	"It's Only Love" (live with Melissa Etheridge)	4:44
4.	"Run to You" (live)	5:31

UK CD single

No.	Title	Length
1.	"Star"
2.	"Let's Make a Night to Remember" (live)
3.	"All for Love" (live)
4.	"(Everything I Do) I Do It for You" (live)

Tracks two, three, and four were recorded live at Wembley in 1996.

== Personnel ==
Personnel taken from 18 Til I Die liner notes.

- Bryan Adams – vocals, guitar
- Keith Scott – guitar
- Mutt Lange – guitar
- Dave Taylor – bass
- Mickey Curry – drums
- Olle Romo – percussion, keyboards

== Charts ==
Chart (1996)	Peak position
Belgium (Ultratip Bubbling Under Flanders)	17
Europe (Eurochart Hot 100)	51
Germany (GfK)	76
Scotland Singles (OCC)	18
UK Singles (OCC)	13
