= Stadthaus Ulm =

Coordinates: 48°23′53″N 9°59′27″E

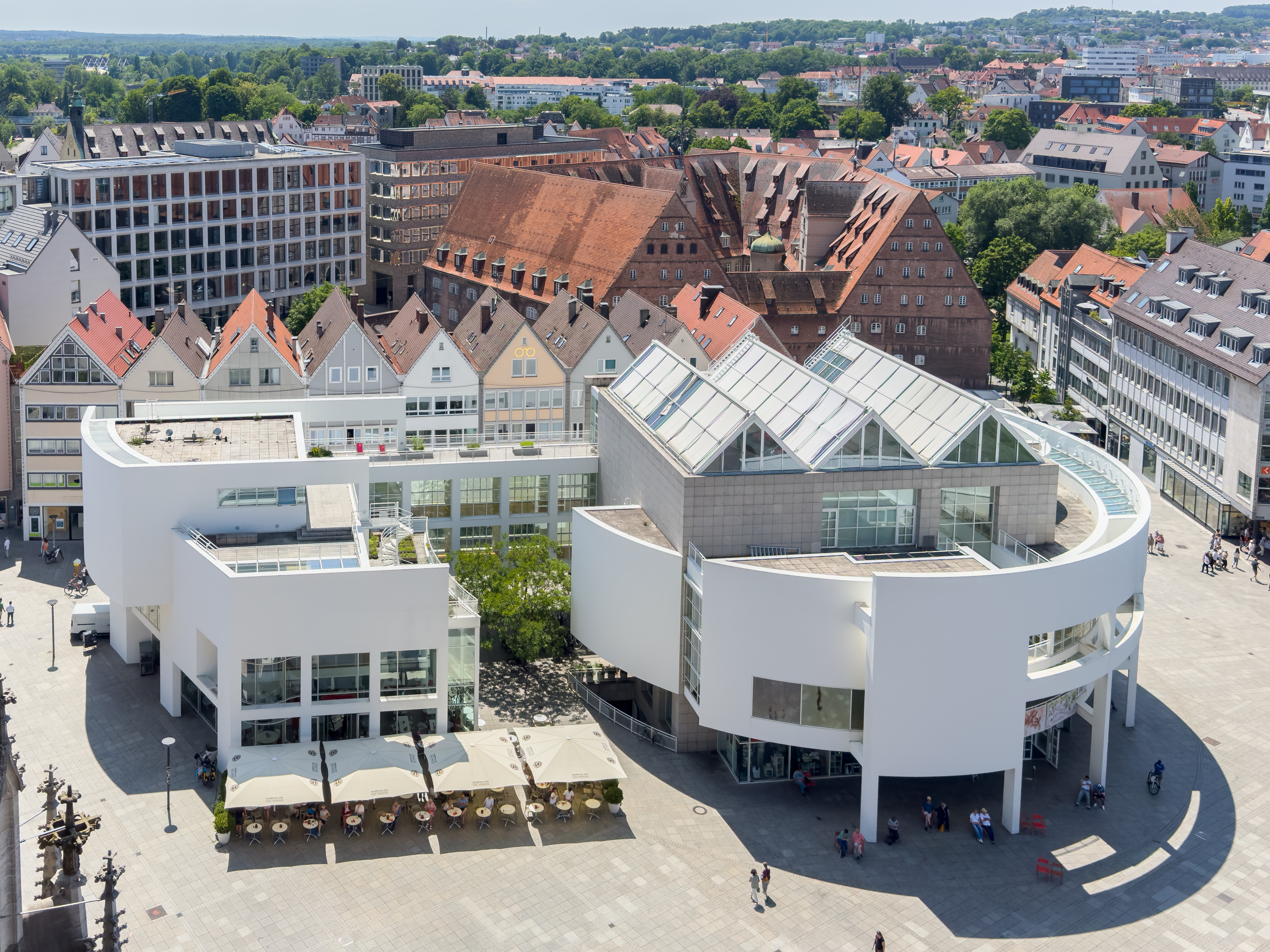
Stadthaus Ulm

The Stadthaus Ulm is in the centre of Ulm (Germany), located on the Münsterplatz (Minster Square). Primarily, the building is used to present exhibitions of photography and modern and contemporary art. A lecture hall is used for a variety of events, activities, and workshops, including a festival of modern music. It houses the city's tourist information centre and other public services on the ground floor. A permanent exhibition of the archaeology and history of the Münsterplatz is located on the lower level.

The US architect Richard Meier attempted to complement and contrast the Gothic style of Ulmer Münster (German: Ulmer Münster) when he created the Stadthaus.

== History ==
For centuries a monastery stood in the square on the site of today’s Stadthaus, which later became a Latin grammar school. It was dismantled in 1878 - shortly before completion of the Minster - to give a better view on the world's highest spire. The design of the square, Münsterplatz, has been the subject of heated arguments for 105 years, resulting in 17 design competitions, in which expert opinions and plans were submitted.

In 1986 Richard Meier’s design was chosen by the panel. However, the decision proved controversial and was subjected to a referendum in 1987, when the population voted narrowly against the proposal. The elected council, the Stadtrat, decided to rule against the narrow vote and construction began in 1991. Opponents continued to campaign against it. However, the Stadthaus was finished in 1993, and in 2019 the building was listed as monument significant to national heritage: 'Kulturdenkmal von besonderer Bedeutung'.

Today, the Stadthaus forms the centre of the redevelopment of Ulm’s city centre.

== Architecture ==
The Stadthaus provides a total area of 3,600 m^{2} on four levels, connected by an open staircase, with views of the interior and the exterior beyond. Richard Meier designed the interior space with contrasting linear and curving forms. The materials used in the building relate to the immediate surroundings: Spanish Rosa Dante granite was used in the cladding of the building, the floor of the terraces, and the pavement of the square. The incline of the roof reflects the architecture of the neighboring buildings.

== Events and exhibitions ==
The Stadthaus both organizes and co-produces cultural events. It has become a local, national, and international hub for events in the fields of arts, science and scholarship, politics, business, media, and current topics of common interest to the public.

The main hall seats up to 320 people and serves as a concert hall, lecture theatre, discussion forum, and congress venue. The exhibition program focuses on contemporary art, including photography, as well as on architecture and environmental planning. It is a particular concern of the Stadthaus to provide a platform for young, upcoming artists.

Another central component of the Stadthaus’ concept is the annual ‘Festival für Neue Musik’ (‘Festival of contemporary music’).

== Gallery ==
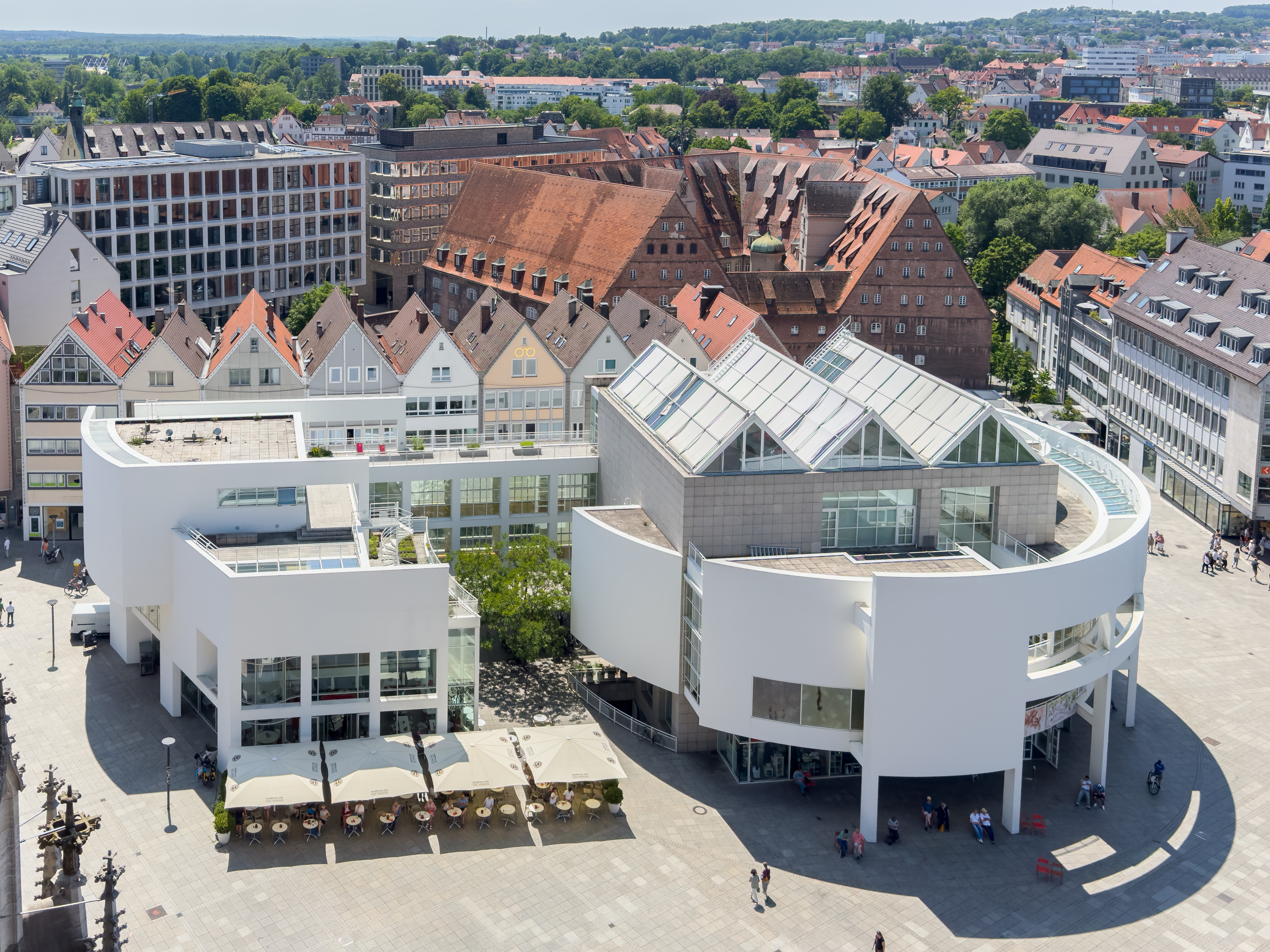

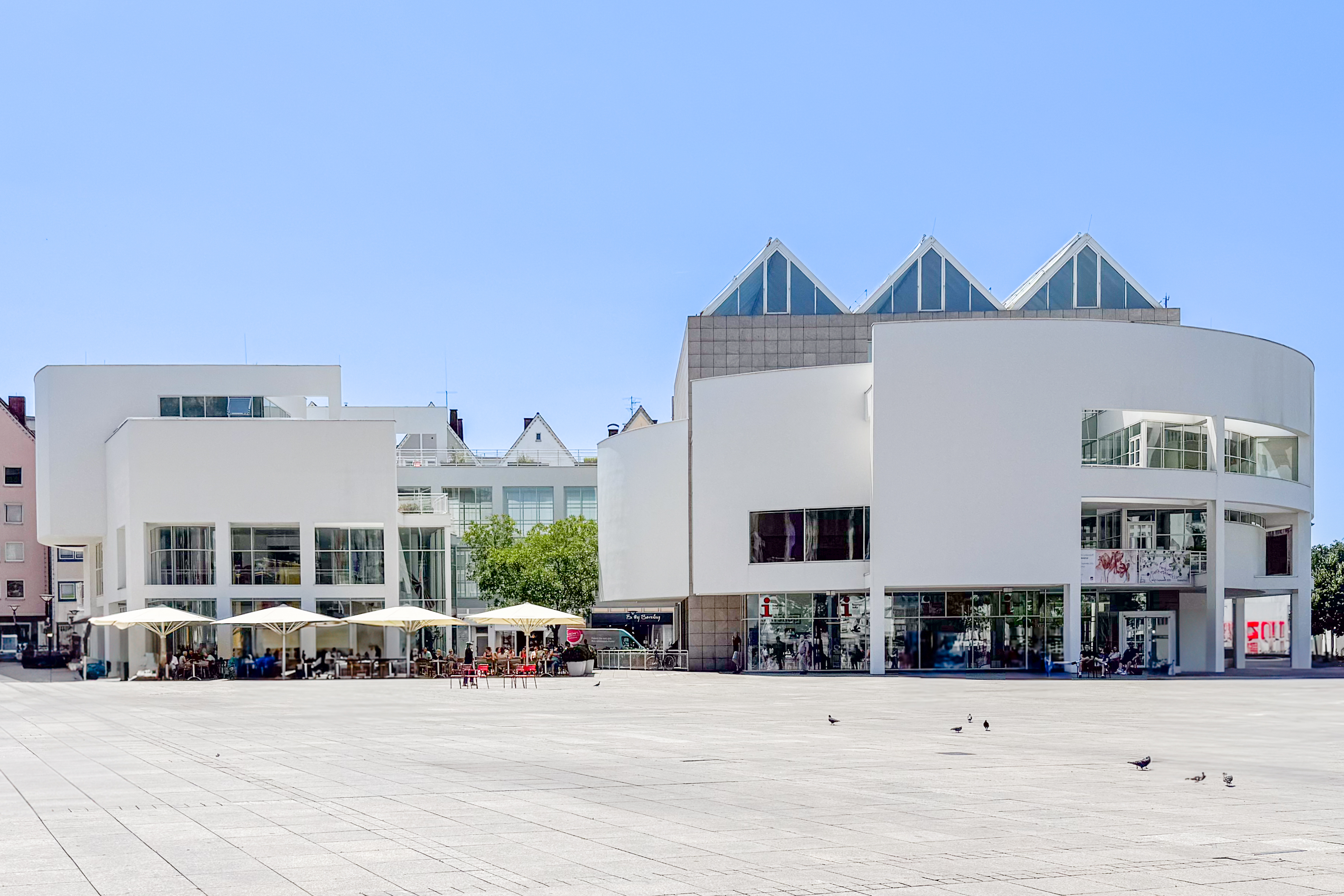

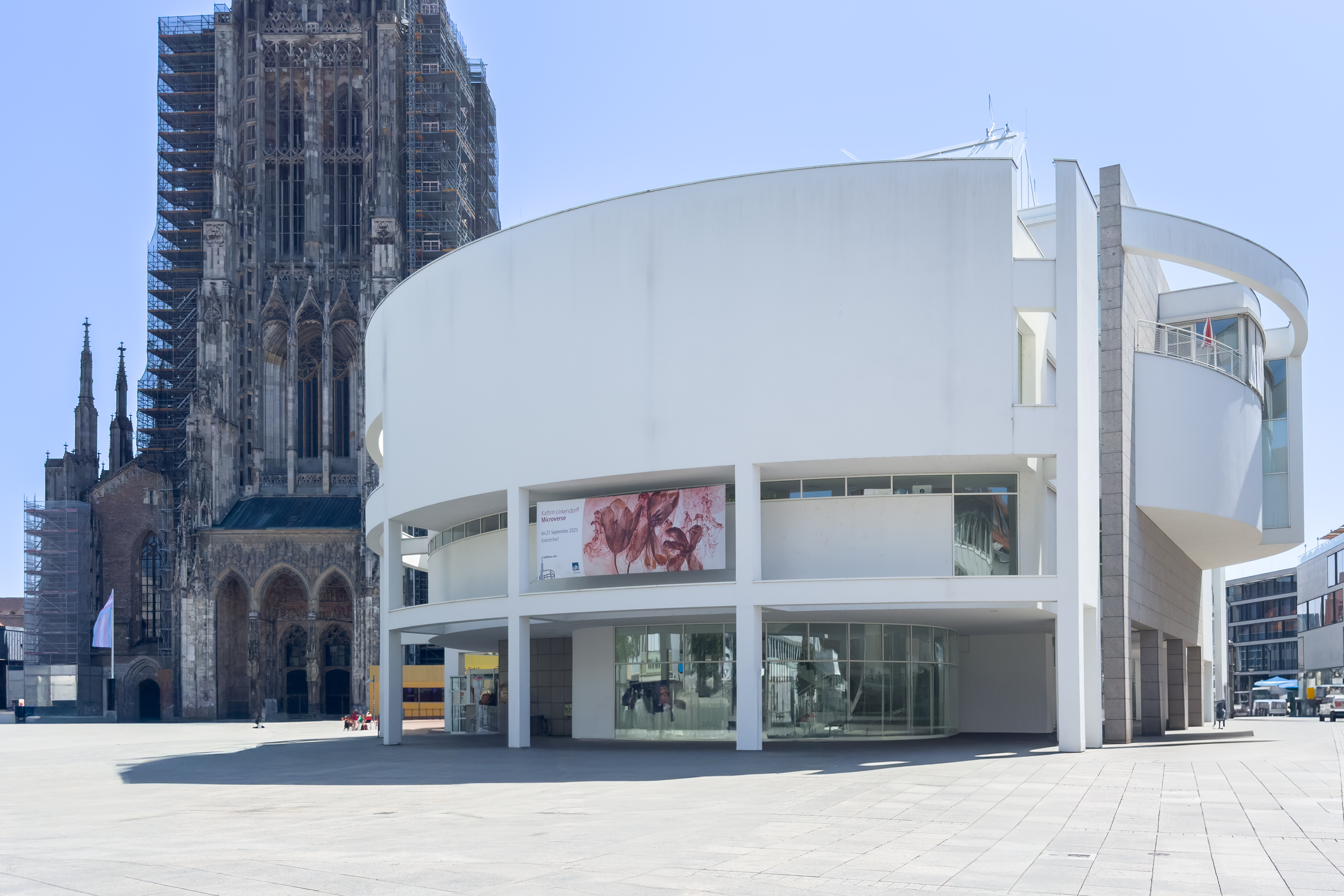

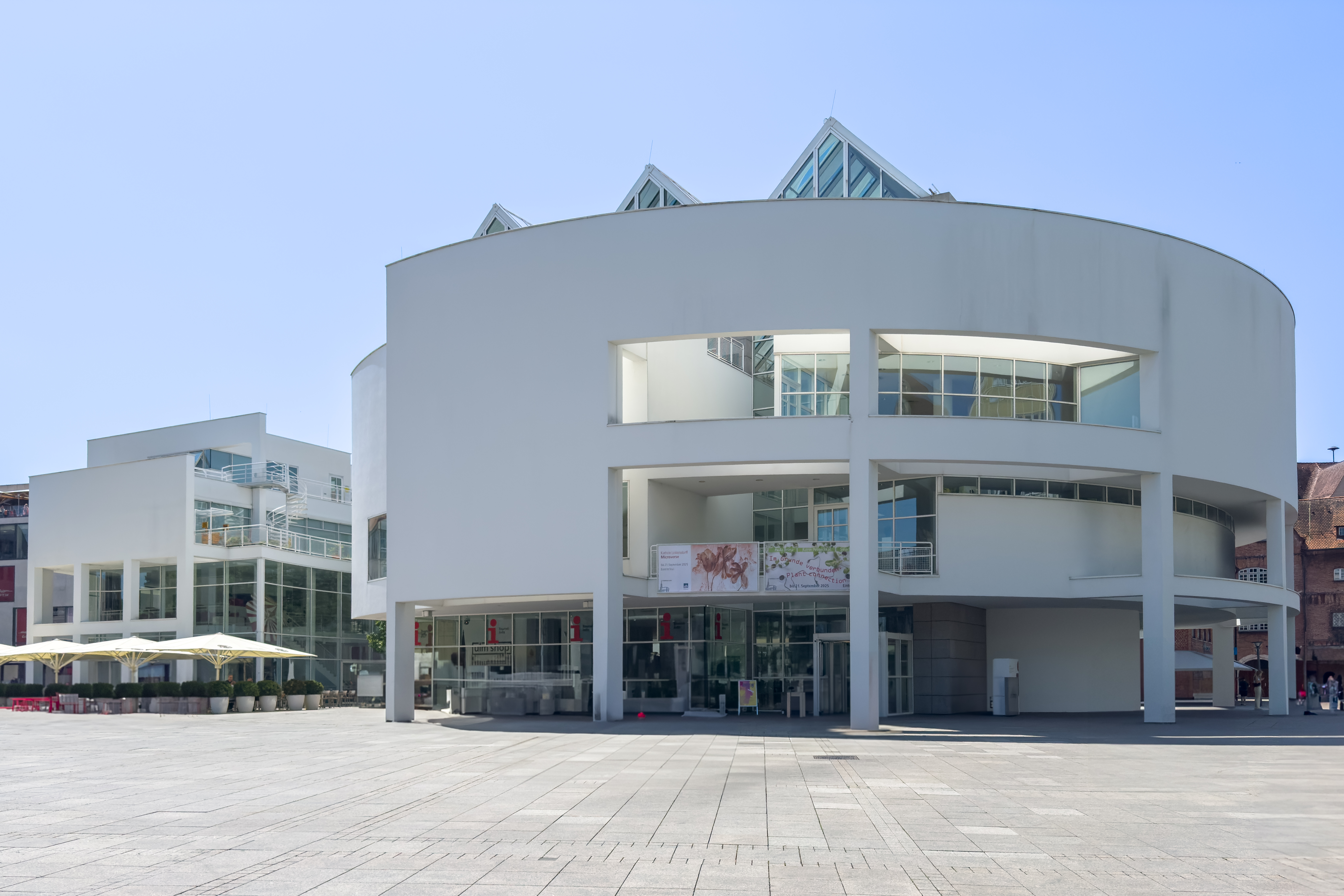

== Literature ==
- Max Stemshorn, Alexander Wetzig (eds.): Münsterplatz, ein europäischer Stadtraum im Wandel: der Ulmer Münsterplatz in Geschichte und Gegenwart. Ulm: Süddeutsche Verlagsgesellschaft, 2nd edition, 2005, ISBN 3-88294-358-0
- Adolf Silberberger: Neugestaltung Ulmer Münsterplatz. Ulm: Süddeutsche Verlagsgesellschaft, 1993, ISBN 3-88294-195-2
- Richard Meier, E. M. Hallworth (transl.), Anke Zeppenfeld (transl.), Karla Nieraad (ed.): "Das Stadthaus hat einen besonderen Platz in meinem Herzen": Anmerkungen zum Stadthaus Ulm. Reihe: Edition Stadthaus, Vol. 1, Ulm: Stadthaus 2007, ISBN 978-3-934727-19-9
- Manfred Sack, with Klaus Kinold (photography), Axel Menges (ed.), Michael Robinson (transl.): Richard Meier, Stadthaus Ulm. Reihe: Opus, Bd. 9, Stuttgart: Ed. Menges, 1994, ISBN 3-930698-09-9
- Stephan Barthelmess, International Creative Management (ed.): Richard Meier - Stadthaus Ulm. Niederstotzingen: International Creative Management, 1993, ISBN 3-9803357-1-2
- Anja Göbel, Karla Nieraad, Katja Storr: Stadthaus Ulm. 2nd edition, Ulm 2005, ISBN 978-3-934727-06-9
