= Let's Make a Night to Remember =

1996 single by Bryan Adams

Single by Bryan Adams

from the album 18 til I Die
- Released: August 12, 1996
- Length: 6:19
- Label: A&M
- Songwriters: Bryan Adams; Robert John "Mutt" Lange
- Producers: Bryan Adams; Robert John "Mutt" Lange

Bryan Adams singles chronology
"The Only Thing That Looks Good on Me Is You" (1996)	"Let's Make a Night to Remember" (1996)	"Star" (1996)

"Let's Make a Night to Remember" is a song written by Canadian rock artist Bryan Adams, and Robert John "Mutt" Lange. It was recorded by Adams and released on August 12, 1996, as the second single from his seventh studio album, 18 til I Die (1996). The song's musical-style and production were heavily inspired by rock and pop music from the 1980s, and its lyrics chronicle a relationship.

The song became Adams' eighth number-one single in Canada, topping the RPM 100 Hit Tracks chart for two weeks. In the United States, the song peaked at number 24 on the Billboard Hot 100. Outside North America, it topped the UK Rock Singles Chart and entered the top 10 in Australia and on the UK Singles Chart. For producing the track, Adams was nominated for Best Producer at the Juno Awards of 1997.

== Critical reception ==
Paul Verna from Billboard described the song as an "epic ballad". The magazine's Larry Flick felt that "this rhythmic ballad is a far more obvious top 40 entry than Adams' previous single, 'The Only Thing That Looks Good on Me (Is You)'—but it's not nearly as much fun." He added, "Still, this cut is notches above its competition in quality. And Adams succeeds in lowering his well-worn rasp to a sexy whisper here, transforming simple words of love into an irresistible seduction. Gratefully, the band kicks through the walls of synths with enough rock bite to keep this track from withering into fluff." Daina Darzin from Cash Box noted that it "sports a languid, romantic groove." British magazine Music Week rated the song three out of five, adding, "A smoochier ballad than of late, from his 18 'Til I Die album, although it retains the classic Adams' touch. Another hit."

== Track listings ==
- Single-CD: A&M Records / 581 861-2 Europe
1. "Let's Make A Night To Remember (LP Version)" – 6:19 (Bryan Adams, Robert John "Mutt" Lange)
2. "Rock Steady" – 3:44 (Bryan Adams, Gretchen Peters)
3. "If Ya Wanna Be Bad Ya Gotta Be Good" – 2:27 (Bryan Adams, Gretchen Peters)
4. "Hey Little Girl" – 4:38 (Bryan Adams, Robert John "Mutt" Lange)
- Single-CD: A&M Records / 581 867-2 UK
1. "Let's Make A Night To Remember (Single Version)" – 4:35 (Bryan Adams, Robert John "Mutt" Lange)
2. "If Ya Wanna Be Bad Ya Gotta Be Good" – 2:27 (Bryan Adams, Gretchen Peters)
3. "Little Red Rooster" – 3:31 (Willie Dixon)
4. "Let's Make A Night To Remember" – 6:20 (Bryan Adams, Robert John "Mutt" Lange)
- Single-CD: A&M Records / POCM-1182 Japan
1. "Let's Make A Night To Remember" – 6:19 (Bryan Adams, Robert John "Mutt" Lange)
2. "Star" – 3:42 ()
3. "Rock Steady" – 3:45 (Bryan Adams, Gretchen Peters)
4. "Hey Little Girl" – 4:38 (Bryan Adams, Robert John "Mutt" Lange)

== Personnel ==
Personnel are taken from the 18 Til I Die liner notes.

- Bryan Adams – vocals, guitar
- Keith Scott – lead guitar, electric sitar
- Mutt Lange – guitar
- Dave Taylor – bass
- Mickey Curry – drums
- Olle Romo – percussion, keyboards

== Charts ==
=== Weekly charts ===
Chart (1996)	Peak position
Australia (ARIA)	7
Austria (Ö3 Austria Top 40)	34
Belgium (Ultratop 50 Flanders)	48
Canada Top Singles (RPM)	1
Canada Adult Contemporary (RPM)	1
Czech Republic (IFPI CR)	4
Estonia (Eesti Top 20)	4
Europe (Eurochart Hot 100)	38
Europe Airplay (European Hit Radio)	3
Germany (GfK)	57
Hungary Airplay (HCRA)	2
Iceland (Íslenski Listinn Topp 40)	27
Ireland (IRMA)	25
Netherlands (Dutch Top 40 Tipparade)	16
Netherlands (Single Tip)	11
New Zealand (Recorded Music NZ)	17
Scottish Singles Sales (Official Charts)	14
Sweden (Sverigetopplistan)	39
Switzerland (Schweizer Hitparade)	41
UK Singles (Official Charts)	10
UK Rock & Metal (Official Charts)	1
US Billboard Hot 100	24
US Adult Contemporary (Billboard)	6
US Adult Pop Airplay (Billboard)	14
US Pop Airplay (Billboard)	24
US Cash Box Top 100	23

=== Year-end charts ===
Chart (1996)	Position
Australia (ARIA)	36
Canada Top Singles (RPM)	14
Canada Adult Contemporary (RPM)	7
US Top 40/Mainstream (Billboard)	86

== Certifications ==
Region	Certification	Certified units/sales
Australia (ARIA)	Gold	35,000^{^}
^{^} Shipments figures based on certification alone.

== Release history ==
Region	Date	Format(s)	Label(s)	Ref.
United States	August 6, 1996	Contemporary hit radio	A&M	
United Kingdom	August 12, 1996	CD; cassette	A&M	
Japan	September 11, 1996	CD	A&M	
