= The Only Thing That Looks Good on Me Is You =

1996 single by Bryan Adams

Single by Bryan Adams

from the album 18 til I Die
- B-side: "Hey Elvis"; "I Want It All"
- Released: May 8, 1996
- Length: 3:37 (album version); 3:24 (single version)
- Label: A&M
- Songwriters: Bryan Adams; Robert John "Mutt" Lange
- Producers: Bryan Adams; Robert John "Mutt" Lange

Bryan Adams singles chronology
"Rock Steady" (1995)	"The Only Thing That Looks Good on Me Is You" (1996)	"Let's Make a Night to Remember" (1996)

Music video
- "The Only Thing That Looks Good On Me Is You" on YouTube

"The Only Thing That Looks Good on Me Is You" is a song by Canadian singer-songwriter Bryan Adams. Adams co-wrote and co-produced the track with Robert John "Mutt" Lange. It was released in May 1996 by A&M Records as the lead single from Adams' seventh studio album, 18 til I Die (1996). The song peaked at number one in Canada, number six in the United Kingdom, and number 52 in the United States. The accompanying music video was directed by Matthew Rolston.

In 1997, Adams was nominated for the Grammy Award for Best Male Rock Vocal Performance for the song but lost to Beck's "Where It's At". Adams was also nominated for a Juno Award for Best Producer the same year. The track appears on Adams' compilation albums The Best of Me and Anthology.

== Critical reception ==
Larry Flick from Billboard magazine wrote, "Adams' single output has been so ballad-heavy in recent years that it is easy to forget that he is a diehard rocker at the core. This first peek into his forthcoming 18 'Til I Die collection is a fun reminder of that fact, as Adams tears through a hearty spree of blues-tinged pop beats and jittery guitars with the glee of a hormone-crazed kid in his first band." Another Billboard editor, Paul Verna noted that "Adam excels" on "the straight-ahead rocker". Daina Darzin from Cash Box described it as "a happy, driving rocker with a big, catchy hook".

== Music video ==
The music video for "The Only Thing That Looks Good on Me Is You" was directed by Matthew Rolston, who also directed "Let's Make a Night to Remember". The video was nominated for MTV Video Music Award for Best Male Video. In an interview with Songfacts, Adams stated that the clip is his own favorite video. It features various male and female models (including Ana Cristina Oliveira) walking and dancing up and down a catwalk wearing sexy and outrageous outfits. It also features Adams in a bathroom sitting on the toilet with his guitar and standing in front of the mirror trying to do his hair. A shot from recording sessions is used as the cover of Adams' 18 til I Die album cover. The music video is shown in the film Red Corner (1997) starring Richard Gere.

== Track listings ==
- Canadian, US, Australian, and Japanese CD single
1. "The Only Thing That Looks Good on Me Is You" (single version) – 3:24
2. "Hey Elvis" – 3:23
3. "I Want It All" – 4:46
4. "The Only Thing That Looks Good on Me Is You" – 3:40
- US 7-inch and cassette single; Japanese mini-CD single
1. "The Only Thing That Looks Good on Me Is You" (single version) – 3:24
2. "Hey Elvis" – 3:23
- UK CD single
1. "The Only Thing That Looks Good on Me Is You" (single version)
2. "Summer of '69"
3. "Cuts Like a Knife"
4. "Thought I'd Died and Gone to Heaven"

== Personnel ==
Personnel are taken the from 18 Til I Die liner notes.

- Bryan Adams – vocals, 12-string guitar, wah guitar
- Keith Scott – guitar
- Mutt Lange – guitar
- Dave Taylor – bass
- Mickey Curry – drums
- Olle Romo – percussion
- The Pointless Brothers [Bryan Adams and Mutt Lange] – backing vocals

== Charts ==
=== Weekly charts ===
Chart (1996)	Peak position
Australia (ARIA)	19
Austria (Ö3 Austria Top 40)	17
Belgium (Ultratop 50 Flanders)	30
Canada Top Singles (RPM)	1
Canada Adult Contemporary (RPM)	4
Czech Republic (IFPI CR)	4
Estonia (Eesti Top 20)	2
Europe (Eurochart Hot 100)	13
Finland (Suomen virallinen lista)	9
Germany (GfK)	44
Hungary (Mahasz)	5
Iceland (Íslenski Listinn Topp 40)	20
Ireland (IRMA)	26
Israel (Israeli Singles Chart)	11
Italy Airplay (Music & Media)	2
Netherlands (Dutch Top 40)	23
Netherlands (Single Top 100)	21
New Zealand (Recorded Music NZ)	37
Poland Airplay (Music & Media)	5
Scottish Singles Sales (Official Charts)	6
Sweden (Sverigetopplistan)	24
Switzerland (Schweizer Hitparade)	5
UK Singles (Official Charts)	6
UK Rock & Metal (Official Charts)	1
US Billboard Hot 100	52
US Adult Pop Airplay (Billboard)	26
US Pop Airplay (Billboard)	29
US Cash Box Top 100	47

=== Year-end charts ===
Chart (1996)	Position
Australia (ARIA)	81
Canada Top Singles (RPM)	18
Canada Adult Contemporary(RPM)	29
UK Airplay (Music Week)	47

== Release history ==
Region	Date	Format(s)	Label(s)	Ref.
Canada	May 8, 1996	—N/a	A&M	
United States	May 14, 1996	Contemporary hit radio	A&M	
United Kingdom	May 20, 1996	7-inch vinyl; CD; cassette	A&M	
Japan	May 22, 1996	CD; mini-CD	A&M	
