= List of awards and nominations received by Bryan Adams =

Bryan Adams awards and nominations
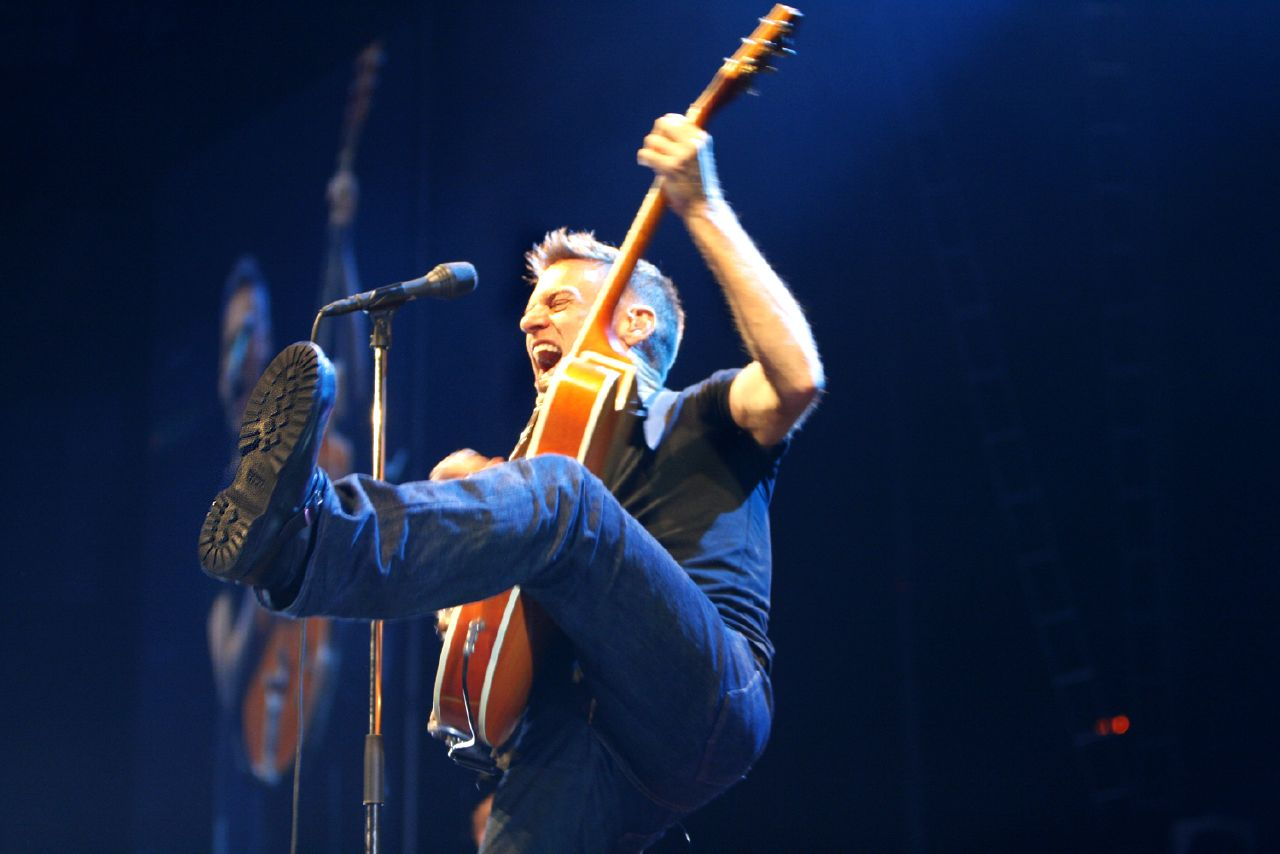
- Adams playing live in Hamburg, Germany
Awards and nominations
Award	Wins	Nominations
Academy Awards	0	3
American Music Award	1	3
Ascap Award	5	5
Bambi Award	2	2
Bravo Otto	3	3
Canadian Screen Awards	1	1
CMT Music Awards	0	1
Echo Music Prize	1	1
Golden Globe Awards	0	5
Goldene Kamera	1	1
GMA Dove Award	1	1
Grammy Award	1	16
Ivor Novello Awards	3	3
Juno Awards	20	62
Lead Awards	3	3
MTV Video Music Award	1	10
NME Awards	1	1
Silver Clef Award	1	1
SOCAN	37	37
Songwriters Hall of Fame	0	4
World Music Awards	3	3
World Soundtrack Awards	0	2
- Total
Awards won	132
Nominations	227

Bryan Adams is a Canadian singer-songwriter and guitarist. He has won 20 Juno Awards among 62 nominations, including wins for Best Male Artist in 2000 and Male Vocalist of the Year in 1997 and every year from 1983 to 1987. Adams has also had 16 Grammy Award nominations including a win for Best Song Written Specifically for a Motion Picture or Television for "(Everything I Do) I Do It for You" at the Grammy Awards in 1992. Adams also won 36 Socan Awards, some of which were in collaboration with his friend and partner Jim Vallance. Adams has also received awards and nominations at the American Music Awards, MTV Video Music Awards, and Golden Globe Awards.

In 1995, he collaborated with Sting and Rod Stewart for the single "All for Love", which received a Grammy nomination that same year.

Adams was appointed to the Order of Canada and the Order of British Columbia for his contribution to popular music and his philanthropic work. He was also inducted into Canada's Walk of Fame and Canadian Broadcast Hall of Fame in 1998. In April 2006 he was inducted into the Music Hall of Fame at Canada's Juno Award, and in 2007 he was nominated for his fifth Golden Globe for the song "Never Gonna Break My Faith" which appeared on the soundtrack for the movie Bobby. In 2018, Billboard ranked Adams at number 45 of the top-selling 100 artists in the US. In 2020 he won his 20th Juno Awards of his career, with the album Shine a Light, joining his compatriot Celine Dion.

== Honours ==
Year	Nominated work	Honour	Result
1998	Bryan Adams	Officer of the Order of Canada	Won
1998	Bryan Adams	Officer of the Order of British Columbia	Won
1998	Bryan Adams	Canada's Walk of Fame	Won
1998	Bryan Adams	Canadian Broadcast Hall of Fame	Won
2002	Bryan Adams	Queen Elizabeth II Golden Jubilee Medal	Won
2010	Bryan Adams	Governor General's Performing Arts Award for Lifetime Artistic Achievement	Won
2010	Bryan Adams	Allan Waters Humanitarian Award	Won
2011	Bryan Adams	Hollywood Walk of Fame	Won
2012	Bryan Adams	Queen Elizabeth II Diamond Jubilee Medal	Won
2025	Bryan Adams	Kraków's Walk of Fame	Won

== Academy Awards ==
The Academy Awards, popularly known as the Oscars, are awards of merit presented annually by the Academy of Motion Picture Arts and Sciences (AMPAS) to recognize excellence of professionals in the film industry, including directors, actors, and writers. The formal ceremony at which the awards are presented is among the oldest, prestigious, and most watched film award ceremony in the world. Adams has been nominated three times but has never won.

Year	Nominee / work	Award	Result
1992	"(Everything I Do) I Do It for You" from Robin Hood: Prince of Thieves	Best Original Song	Nominated
1996	"Have You Ever Really Loved a Woman?" from Don Juan DeMarco	Best Original Song	Nominated
1997	"I Finally Found Someone" from The Mirror Has Two Faces	Best Original Song	Nominated

== American Music Awards ==
The American Music Awards (AMA) are awarded for achievements in the record industry. Adams has won one AMA, and been nominated for three.

Year	Nominee / work	Award	Result
1992	Bryan Adams	Favorite Pop/Rock Male Artist	Nominated
1992	"(Everything I Do) I Do It for You"	Favorite Pop/Rock Single	Won
1997	Bryan Adams	Favorite Pop/Rock Male Artist	Nominated

== APRA Music Awards ==
The APRA Awards in Australia are annual awards to celebrate excellence in contemporary music, which honour the skills of member composers, songwriters, and publishers who have achieved outstanding success in sales and airplay performance.

Year	Nominee / work	Award	Result
1992	"(Everything I Do) I Do It for You"	Most Performed Foreign Work	Won
1994	"Please Forgive Me"	Most Performed Foreign Work	Nominated

== ASCAP Film and Television Music Awards ==
The Ascap Award its leading members a series of annual awards, divided into nine categories: "Pop", "Rhythm and Soul", "Film and Television", "Latina", "Country", "Christian", "Rock", "Metal", "Rap", "Concert Music". In addition, ASCAP includes jazz musicians in its Jazz Wall of Fame with an annual ceremony held at the company's New York headquarters.

Year	Nominee / work	Award	Result
1992	"(Everything I Do) I Do It for You"	Most Performed Songs from Motion Pictures	Won
1995	"All for Love"	Most Performed Songs from Motion Pictures	Won
1996	"Have You Ever Really Loved a Woman?"	Most Performed Songs from Motion Pictures	Won
1998	"I Finally Found Someone"	Most Performed Songs from Motion Pictures	Won
2003	"Here I Am"	Top Box Office Films	Won

== BMI Songwriter Awards ==
Year	Nominee / work	Award	Result
1985	"Heaven"	Citation of Achievement for significant U.S. radio airplay	Won
1985	"Summer of '69"	Citation of Achievement for significant U.S. radio airplay	Won
1985	"Run to You"	Citation of Achievement for significant U.S. radio airplay	Won
1986	"When the Night Comes"	Citation of Achievement for significant U.S. radio airplay	Won

== Bravo Otto ==
Bravo Otto is an award established in Germany in 1957 and awarded annually to personalities from the world of entertainment. Three prizes are awarded for each category: a "Bravo Otto d'oro", a "Bravo Otto silver" and a "Bravo Otto di bronze".

Year	Recipient	Award	Result1	Result2
1991	Bryan Adams	Male singer	Gold	Won
1992	Bryan Adams	Male singer	Bronze	Won
1994	Bryan Adams	Male singer	Bronze	Won

== Canadian Screen Awards ==
The Canadian Screen Awards are awards annually awarded by the Academy of Canadian Cinema & Television, which recognize excellence in Canadian film, English-language television and digital media production.

Year	Nominee / work	Award	Result
2018	Bryan Adams	Best Host in a Live Program or Series	Won

== Canadian Songwriters Hall of Fame ==
Year	Nominee / work	Award	Result
2022	Himself	Hall of Fame	Inducted

== CMT Music Awards ==
In 2010 Adams received a CMT Music Awards nomination for his duet with Jason Aldean from CMT Crossroads.

Year	Nominee / work	Award	Result
2010	Bryan Adams&Jason Aldean	Collaborative Video of the Year – "Heaven"	Nominated

== Echo Music Prize ==
The Echo Music Prize (in German Echo Musikpreis) are prizes awarded since 1992 to the most important German and international artists by the Deutsche Phono-Akademie.

Year	Nominee / work	Award	Result
1995	Bryan Adams	Best International Rock/Pop Male Artist	Won

== Golden Globe Awards ==
This category of the Hollywood Foreign Press Associations Golden Globe Awards recognizes soundtrack achievements. Adams has been nominated for five Golden Globes.

Year	Nominee / work	Award	Result
1992	"(Everything I Do) I Do It for You"	Best Original Song - Motion Picture	Nominated
1996	"Have You Ever Really Loved A Woman?"	Best Original Song - Motion Picture	Nominated
1997	"I Finally Found Someone"	Best Original Song - Motion Picture	Nominated
2003	"Here I Am"	Best Original Song - Motion Picture	Nominated
2007	"Never Gonna Break My Faith"	Best Original Song - Motion Picture	Nominated

== Goldene Kamera ==
The Goldene Kamera is a German television-film award that has been awarded annually by the television magazine HÖRZU since 1965, for non-fixed categories.

Year	Nominee / work	Award	Result
2005	Bryan Adams	Best International Artist in der Kategorie	Won

== GMA Dove Award ==
The GMA Dove Award is a musical award assigned by the Gospel Music Association (GMA) and dedicated to the sacred music sector.

Year	Nominee / work	Award	Result
2017	Bryan Adams	Artist of the Year	Won

== Grammy Awards ==
The Grammy Awards are awarded annually by the National Academy of Recording Arts and Sciences of the United States. Adams has won one Grammy and has been nominated for another 14. Also, in 1992, Michael Kamen won a Grammy Award for Best Pop Instrumental Performance for Robin Hood: Prince of Thieves, performing some of Adams' work, and Adams received an American Paper Institute Environmental Award for environmental packaging for Waking Up the Neighbours.

Year	Nominee / work	Award	Result
1986	Reckless	Best Rock Vocal Performance - Male	Nominated
1986	"It's Only Love"	Best Rock Vocal Performance by a Duo or Group	Nominated
1992	"(Everything I Do) I Do It for You"	Record of the Year	Nominated
1992	"(Everything I Do) I Do It for You"	Song of the Year	Nominated
1992	"(Everything I Do) I Do It for You"	Best Pop Vocal Performance - Male	Nominated
1992	"(Everything I Do) I Do It for You"	Best Song Written for a Motion Picture, Television or Other Visual Media	Won
1992	"Can't Stop This Thing We Started"	Best Rock Solo Performance	Nominated
1992	"Can't Stop This Thing We Started"	Best Rock Song	Nominated
1993	"There Will Never Be Another Tonight"	Best Rock Vocal Performance - Male	Nominated
1995	"All for Love"	Best Pop Collaboration with Vocals	Nominated
1996	"Have You Ever Really Loved a Woman?"	Best Male Pop Vocal Performance	Nominated
1996	"Have You Ever Really Loved a Woman?"	Best Song Written for a Motion Picture, Television or Other Visual Media	Nominated
1997	"Let's Make a Night to Remember"	Best Male Pop Vocal Performance	Nominated
1997	"The Only Thing That Looks Good on Me Is You"	Best Male Rock Vocal Performance	Nominated
1998	"I Finally Found Someone"	Best Pop Collaboration with Vocals	Nominated
2023	"So Happy It Hurts"	Best Rock Performance	Nominated

== Kerrang! ==
Kerrang!, list of album category charts of the year and all time.

Year	Recipient	Award	Result1	Result2
1985	Reckless	Album of the Year	1	Won
1988	Reckless	The Best AOR Albums Of All Time	16	Nominated
1989	Reckless	100 Greatest Heavy Metal Albums Of All Time	49	Nominated

== Ivor Novello Awards ==
The Ivor Novello Awards are awarded for songwriting and composing. The awards, named after the Cardiff born entertainer Ivor Novello, are presented annually in London by the British Academy of Songwriters, Composers and Authors (BASCA).

Year	Nominee / work	Award	Result
1992	"(Everything I Do) I Do It for You"	Award in Recognition of the Exception Success of a Single Song	Won
1996	"Have You Ever Really Loved a Woman?"	Best Song Included in a Film or Television Programme	Won
2016	Bryan Adams	PRS for Music Special International Award	Won

== Juno Awards ==
The Juno Awards are presented annually to Canadian musical artists and bands to acknowledge their artistic and technical achievements in all aspects of music. Adams has won 18 awards out of 57 nominations.

Year	Nominee / work	Award	Result
1980	Bryan Adams	Most Promising Male Vocalist of the Year	Nominated
1981	Bryan Adams	Most Promising Male Vocalist of the Year	Nominated
1983	Bryan Adams	Male Vocalist of the Year	Won
1984	Cuts Like a Knife	Album of the Year	Won
1984	"Straight from the Heart"	Single of the Year	Nominated
1984	"Cuts Like a Knife"	Single of the Year	Nominated
1984	Bryan Adams	Male Vocalist of the Year	Won
1984	"Straight from the Heart"	Composer of the Year	Nominated
1984	"Cuts Like a Knife"	Composer of the Year	Won
1984	Bryan Adams	Producer of the Year	Won
1985	Reckless	Album of the Year	Won
1985	"Run to You"	Single of the Year	Nominated
1985	Bryan Adams	Male Vocalist of the Year	Won
1985	Bryan Adams/Jim Vallance	Composer of the Year	Won
1985	Reckless	Producer of the Year	Nominated
1986	"Diana	Single of the Year	Nominated
1986	Bryan Adams	Male Vocalist of the Year	Won
1986	Bryan Adams	Composer of the Year	Nominated
1987	"Heat of the Night"	Single of the Year	Nominated
1987	Bryan Adams	Male Vocalist of the Year	Won
1987	Bryan Adams	Composer of the Year	Nominated
1987	Bryan Adams (Co-producer Bob Clearmountain)	Producer of the Year	Nominated
1987	Into the Fire	Album of the Year	Nominated
1987	Bryan Adams	Canadian Entertainer of the Year	Won
1989	Bryan Adams	Canadian Entertainer of the Year	Nominated
1992	Waking Up the Neighbours	Album of the Year	Nominated
1992	Bryan Adams	Canadian Entertainer of the Year	Won
1992	"(Everything I Do) I Do It for You"	Single of the Year	Nominated
1992	"Can't Stop This Thing We Started"	Single of the Year	Nominated
1992	Bryan Adams	Male Vocalist of the Year	Nominated
1992	Bryan Adams	Songwriter of the Year	Nominated
1992	"Everything I Do (I Do It For You)"/"Can't Stop This Thing We Started"	Producer of the Year	Won
1992	Bryan Adams	International Achievement Award	Won
1993	Bryan Adams	Canadian Entertainer of the Year	Nominated
1993	Waking Up the Neighbors	Best Selling Album (Foreign or Domestic)	Won
1993	"Thought I'd Died and Gone to Heaven"	Single of the Year	Nominated
1993	Bryan Adams	Songwriter of the Year	Nominated
1995	"Please Forgive Me"	Single of the Year	Nominated
1995	Bryan Adams	Songwriter of the Year	Nominated
1996	Bryan Adams	Levi's Entertainer of the Year	Nominated
1996	"Have You Ever Really Loved a Woman?"	Single of the Year	Nominated
1996	Bryan Adams	Songwriter of the Year	Nominated
1996	"Have You Ever Really Loved a Woman?"	Producer of the Year	Nominated
1997	18 til I Die	Album of the Year	Nominated
1997	Bryan Adams	Male Vocalist of the Year	Won
1997	Bryan Adams	Songwriter of the Year	Nominated
1997	"The Only Thing That Looks Good on Me is You"/"Let's Make A Night to Remember"	Producer of the Year	Nominated
1999	Bryan Adams	Best Songwriter	Won
1999	"C'mon, C'mon, C'mon"/"How Do Ya Feel Tonight"	Best Producer	Nominated
2000	On a Day Like Today	Best Album	Nominated
2000	Bryan Adams	Best Male Artist	Won
2000	On a Day Like Today	Best Pop/Adult Album	Nominated
2001	"The Best of Me"	Best Songwriter	Nominated
2005	Bryan Adams	Artist of the Year	Nominated
2005	Room Service	CD/DVD Artwork Design of the Year	Nominated
2006	Bryan Adams	Canadian Music Hall of Fame	Won
2009	Bryan Adams	Artist of the Year	Nominated
2016	Get Up	Rock Album of the Year	Nominated
2020	Shine a Light	Album Of The Year	Nominated
2020	Bryan Adams	Best Male Artist	Nominated
2020	Shine a Light	Adult Contemporary Album Of The Year	Won
2026	Roll with the Punches	Rock Album of the Year	Pending

== Lead Awards ==
The Lead Award is a German media award. The LeadAcademy für Medien e.V. annually awards the prize to the German press and online media.

Year	Nominee / work	Award	Result
2006	Bryan Adams	Porträtfotografie des Jahres	Won
2012	Bryan Adams	Modefotografie des Jahres	Won
2015	Bryan Adams	Porträtfotografie des Jahres	Won

== MTV Video Music Awards ==
The MTV Video Music Awards is an annual awards ceremony established in 1984 by MTV. Adams has been nominated eleven times and has received one award.

Year	Nominee / work	Award	Result
1985	"Run to You"	Best Art Direction	Nominated
1985	"Run to You"	Best Cinematography	Nominated
1985	"Run to You"	Best Editing	Nominated
1985	"Run to You"	Best Visual Effects	Nominated
1985	"Heaven"	Best Cinematography	Nominated
1986	"It's Only Love"	Best Stage Performance in a Video	Won
1986	"Summer of '69"	Best Male Video	Nominated
1991	"(Everything I Do) I Do It for You"	Best Video from a Film	Nominated
1995	"Have You Ever Really Loved a Woman?"	Best Video from a Film	Nominated
1996	"The Only Thing That Looks Good on Me Is You"	Best Male Video	Nominated

== NME Awards ==
The NME Awards were created by the NME magazine and was first held in 1953. Adams has received one award from one nomination.

Year	Nominee / work	Award	Result
1991	"(Everything I Do) I Do It For You"	Worst Single	Won

== Silver Clef Award ==
The Silver Clef Award is a prestigious award that has been awarded annually since 1976 to artists of the UK rock music scene who have distinguished themselves for their outstanding contribution to music.

Year	Nominee / work	Award	Result
1995	Bryan Adams	International Award	Won
2008	Bryan Adams	Ambassadors of Rock Award	Won

== SOCAN Awards ==
The SOCAN Awards is an annual event, held in both Toronto and Montréal, which celebrates the achievements of songwriters, composers and musical publications of Anglophone and Francophone members. SOCAN is the result of a merger in 1990 between the Composers, Authors and Publishers Association of Canada (CAPAC) and the Performing Rights Organization of Canada (PROCAN).

Year	Nominee / work	Award	Result
1979	"Let Me Take You Dancing"	Canadian radio airplay	Won
1982	"Coming Home"	Canadian radio airplay	Won
1983	"Cuts Like a Knife"	Canadian radio airplay	Won
1983	"This Time"	Canadian radio airplay	Won
1984	"Run to You"	Canadian radio airplay	Won
1984	"Heaven"	Canadian radio airplay	Won
1984	"The Best Was Yet to Come"	Canadian radio airplay	Won
1985	"Edge of a Dream"	Canadian radio airplay	Won
1985	"Summer of '69"	Canadian radio airplay	Won
1985	"Somebody"	Canadian radio airplay	Won
1985	"Tears Are Not Enough"	Canadian radio airplay	Won
1992	"(Everything I Do) I Do It for You"	International Song	Won
1993	"Do I Have to Say the Words?"	Pop/Rock Music	Won
1995	"Straight from the Heart"	SOCAN Classics Award for over 100,000 airings in Canada	Won
1995	"The Best Was Yet to Come"	SOCAN Classics Award for over 100,000 airings in Canada	Won
1995	"Heaven"	SOCAN Classics Award for over 100,000 airings in Canada	Won
1996	"Have You Ever Really Loved a Woman?"	International Song	Won
1999	"I'm Ready"	Pop/Rock Music	Won
2000	"On a Day Like Today"	International Song	Won
2000	"Summer of '69"	SOCAN Classics Award for over 100,000 airings in Canada	Won
2004	"Run to You"	SOCAN Classics Award for over 100,000 airings in Canada	Won
2004	"Somebody"	SOCAN Classics Award for over 100,000 airings in Canada	Won
2007	"I'm Ready"	SOCAN Classics Award for over 100,000 airings in Canada	Won
2007	"It's Only Love"	SOCAN Classics Award for over 100,000 airings in Canada	Won
2007	"This Time"	SOCAN Classics Award for over 100,000 airings in Canada	Won
2007	"Cuts Like a Knife"	SOCAN Classics Award for over 100,000 airings in Canada	Won
2017	"Have You Ever Really Loved a Woman?"	SOCAN Classics Award for over 100,000 airings in Canada	Won
2017	"Edge of a Dream"	SOCAN Classics Award for over 100,000 airings in Canada	Won
2017	"When You're Gone (Bryan Adams song)"	SOCAN Classics Award for over 100,000 airings in Canada	Won
2017	"Lonely Nights"	SOCAN Classics Award for over 100,000 airings in Canada	Won
2017	"(Everything I Do) I Do It for You"	SOCAN Classics Award for over 100,000 airings in Canada	Won
2017	"Kids Wanna Rock"	SOCAN Classics Award for over 100,000 airings in Canada	Won
2017	"Do I Have to Say the Words?"	SOCAN Classics Award for over 100,000 airings in Canada	Won
2017	"Heat of the Night"	SOCAN Classics Award for over 100,000 airings in Canada	Won
2017	"Teacher Teacher"	SOCAN Classics Award for over 100,000 airings in Canada	Won
2017	Bryan Adams e Jim Vallance	Lifetime Achievement	Won

== Songwriters Hall of Fame ==
The Songwriters Hall of Fame (SHOF) is a project of the National Academy of Popular Music (NAPM) which aims to create a museum dedicated to the most important songwriters of the US music industry.

Year	Nominee / work	Award	Result
2017	Bryan Adams	Performing Songwriters	Nominated
2023	Bryan Adams	Performing Songwriters	Nominated
2024	Bryan Adams	Performing Songwriters	Nominated
2024	Bryan Adams	Performing Songwriters	Pending

== World Music Awards ==
World Music Awards were annually assigned by the International Federation of the Phonographic Industry and are determined by worldwide record sales. During his career, Adams has won three awards.

Year	Nominee / work	Award	Result
1993	Bryan Adams	Best-Selling Canadian Artist of the Year	Won
1994	Bryan Adams	Best-Selling Canadian Artist of the Year	Won
1995	Bryan Adams	Best-Selling Canadian Artist of the Year	Won

=== Other awards ===
Year	Nominee / work	Award	Result
1984	Bryan Adams	Jack Richardson Producer of the Year Award	Won
1985	Bryan Adams	William Harold Moon Award (with Jim Vallance)	Won
1985	Bryan Adams	Canadian Diamond Award (Reckless)	Won
1986	Bryan Adams	Bob Geldof Humanitarian Award	Won
1987	Bryan Adams	PROCAN Crystal Award	Won
1991	Bryan Adams	List of Smash Hits Poll Winners Party	Won
1991	Bryan Adams	Billboard Music Awards	Won
1991	Bryan Adams	Awards Circuit Community Awards	Nominated
1991	Bryan Adams	Rockbjörnen The year's foreign artist	Won
1991	Bryan Adams	Rockbjörnen The year's foreign album	Won
1992	Bryan Adams	MTV Movie Award for Best Musical Moment	Won
1992	Bryan Adams	Jack Richardson Producer of the Year Award	Won
1992	Bryan Adams	1992 MTV Movie Awards	Won
1992	Bryan Adams	Danish Music Awards	Won
1992	Bryan Adams	Brit Award for International Solo Artist	Nominated
1992	Bryan Adams	American Music Award for Favorite Pop/Rock Male Artist	Nominated
1992	Bryan Adams	American Music Award for Favorite Pop/Rock Song	Won
1992	Bryan Adams	Canadian Diamond Award (Waking Up the Neighbours)	Won
1993	Bryan Adams	American Music Award for Favorite Pop/Rock Male Artist	Nominated
1994	Bryan Adams	MTV Europe Music Award for Best Male	Won
1994	Bryan Adams	MTV Movie Award for Best Musical Moment	Nominated
1994	Bryan Adams	1994 MTV Movie Awards	Nominated
1995	Bryan Adams	Brit Award for International Male Solo Artist	Nominated
1995	Bryan Adams	American Music Award for Favorite Pop/Rock Male Artist	Nominated
1996	Bryan Adams	MTV Europe Music Award for Best Male	Nominated
1996	Bryan Adams	Online Film & Television Association	Nominated
1996	Bryan Adams	Favorite male classic rock	Won
1996	Bryan Adams	Favorite son for a movie	Nominated
1997	Bryan Adams	Brit Award for International Male Solo Artist	Nominated
1997	Bryan Adams	American Music Award for Favorite Pop/Rock Male Artist	Nominated
1997	Bryan Adams	Billboard Music Awards	Nominated
1998	Bryan Adams	Bambi Award (Pop International)	Won
2002	Bryan Adams	World Soundtrack Awards	Nominated
2002	Bryan Adams	World Soundtrack Awards	Nominated
2003	Bryan Adams	Walk of Fame Europe	Won
2006	Bryan Adams	Satellite Award	Nominated
2007	Bryan Adams	Wembley Square of Fame	Won
2007	Bryan Adams	Munich Olympic Walk of Stars	Won
2007	Bryan Adams	Gold Derby Awards	Nominated
2008	Bryan Adams	Emmy Award	Nominated
2009	Bryan Adams	Goldene Feder	Won
2012	Bryan Adams	20/20 Awards	Nominated
2015	Bryan Adams	Allan Slaight Humanitarian Spirit Award	Won
2015	Bryan Adams	Music Express Awards - (Best Male Vocalist)	Won
2015	Bryan Adams	GQ Men of the Year	Won
2015	Bryan Adams	Honorary Fellowship	Won
2024	Bryan Adams	Bambi Award (Legende)	Won

== Recognition ==
- In 2011, "Summer of '69" it ranked #1 in Ultimate Classic Rock's Top 10 Summer Songs.
- In 2018, "(Everything I Do) I Do It for You" it ranked #21 in All-time charts Top 100 songs of all time (1958–2018) di Billboard Hot 100.

== See also ==
- List of best-selling music artists
- List of best-selling singles
- List of best-selling singles in the United States
- List of Billboard number-one singles
- List of artists who reached number one on the Hot 100 (US)
- List of artists who reached number one on the UK Singles Chart
- List of best-selling singles by year in the United Kingdom
