= List of artists by number of Canadian number-one singles (RPM) =

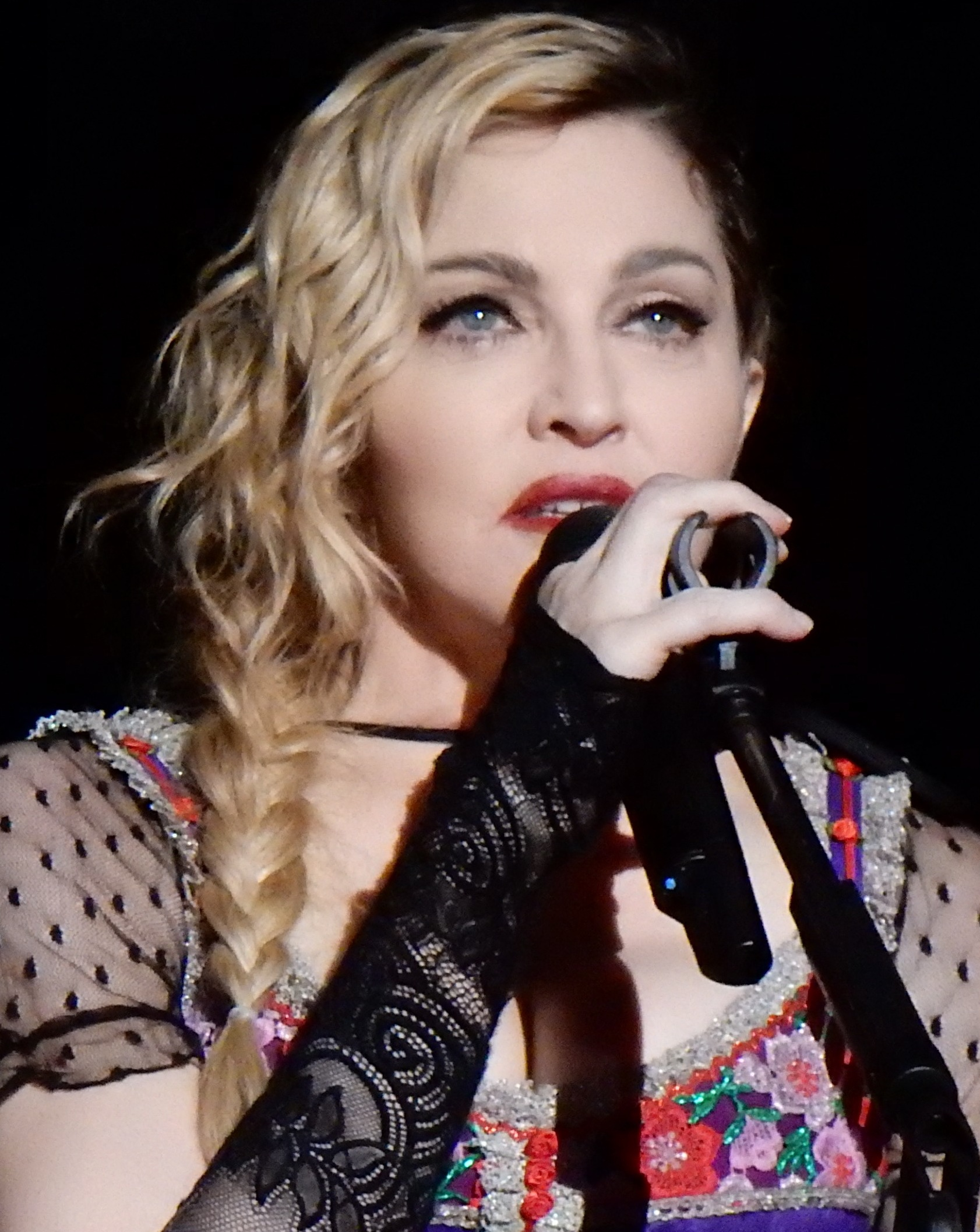
Madonna charted 18 number ones on the RPM Singles Chart, tying with the Beatles. She remains the artist with the most Canadian number-one singles in history, achieving six more number ones post-RPM.

RPM (1964–2000) was the oldest music industry publication in Canada and was considered the country's "music bible". It published Canadian national record charts from June 22, 1964 until its final issue on November 13, 2000.

British band the Beatles and American singer Madonna tied for having the most number-one singles in Canada during this period, each with 18. Nevertheless, after the end of RPM, Madonna continued to score an additional four number ones on Nielsen SoundScan's singles sales chart between 2000 and 2007, and two number ones on Billboard's Canadian Hot 100 since 2007, thus making her the artist with the most number-one singles in the history of Canadian recorded music (with a total of 24 singles). Prior to RPM, the Beatles previously had three number-one singles on the CHUM Chart, thus bringing their total to 21 number-one singles in Canada.

Bryan Adams was the Canadian artist with the most Canadian number-one singles during the RPM era, with 10 number-one singles. Nevertheless, after the end of RPM, Canadian singers Drake and Justin Bieber both surpassed his accomplishment, scoring 14 and 13 chart-toppers respectively on Billboard's Canadian Hot 100.

== Artists with 10 number ones or more ==
Artist	Total	No. 1 singles	Album	First week at No. 1	Total weeks at No. 1	Ref.
The Beatles	18	"A Hard Day's Night"	A Hard Day's Night	17 August 1964	1	
The Beatles	18	"I Feel Fine"	Standalone single	28 December 1964	1	
The Beatles	18	"Eight Days a Week"	Standalone single	8 March 1965	2	
The Beatles	18	"Ticket to Ride"	Help!	24 May 1965	2	
The Beatles	18	"Help!"	Help!	31 August 1965	1	
The Beatles	18	"We Can Work It Out"	Standalone single	24 January 1966	1	
The Beatles	18	"Nowhere Man"	Standalone single	28 March 1966	1	
The Beatles	18	"Paperback Writer"	Standalone single	4 July 1966	1	
The Beatles	18	"Yellow Submarine"/"Eleanor Rigby"	Standalone single	19 September 1966	1	
The Beatles	18	"Penny Lane"	Standalone single	25 March 1967	1	
The Beatles	18	"All You Need Is Love"	Standalone single	26 August 1967	2	
The Beatles	18	"Hello, Goodbye"	Standalone single	23 December 1967	3	
The Beatles	18	"Hey Jude"	Standalone single	30 September 1968	3	
The Beatles	18	"Get Back" with (Billy Preston)	Let It Be	19 May 1969	6	
The Beatles	18	"Something"	Abbey Road	15 November 1969	4	
The Beatles	18	"Let It Be"	Let It Be	11 April 1970	3	
The Beatles	18	"The Long and Winding Road"	Let It Be	20 June 1970	2	
The Beatles	18	"Got to Get You into My Life"	Rock 'n' Roll Music	14 August 1976	1	
Madonna	18	"Like a Virgin"	Like a Virgin	19 January 1985	1	
Madonna	18	"Crazy for You"	Vision Quest	25 May 1985	1	
Madonna	18	"Live to Tell"	True Blue	24 May 1986	2	
Madonna	18	"Papa Don't Preach"	True Blue	9 August 1986	2	
Madonna	18	"True Blue"	True Blue	22 November 1986	1	
Madonna	18	"La Isla Bonita"	True Blue	6 June 1987	1	
Madonna	18	"Who's That Girl"	Who's That Girl	29 August 1987	1	
Madonna	18	"Like a Prayer"	Like a Prayer	29 April 1989	5	
Madonna	18	"Express Yourself"	Like a Prayer	29 July 1989	2	
Madonna	18	"Cherish"	Like a Prayer	14 October 1989	2	
Madonna	18	"Vogue"	I'm Breathless	16 June 1990	3	
Madonna	18	"Justify My Love"	The Immaculate Collection	2 February 1991	1	
Madonna	18	"This Used to Be My Playground"	Standalone single	15 August 1992	3	
Madonna	18	"I'll Remember"	With Honors	16 May 1994	5	
Madonna	18	"Secret"	Bedtime Stories	14 November 1994	3	
Madonna	18	"Take a Bow"	Bedtime Stories	6 March 1995	2	
Madonna	18	"Beautiful Stranger"	Austin Powers: The Spy Who Shagged Me	26 July 1999	2	
Madonna	18	"Music"	Music	11 September 2000	9	
Elton John	17	"Crocodile Rock"	Don't Shoot Me I'm Only the Piano Player	17 February 1973	4	
Elton John	17	"Daniel"	Don't Shoot Me I'm Only the Piano Player	2 June 1973	2	
Elton John	17	"Goodbye Yellow Brick Road"	Goodbye Yellow Brick Road	22 December 1973	1	
Elton John	17	"Bennie and the Jets"	Goodbye Yellow Brick Road	13 April 1974	2	
Elton John	17	"Don't Let the Sun Go Down on Me"	Caribou	10 August 1974	2	
Elton John	17	"The Bitch Is Back"	Caribou	2 November 1974	1	
Elton John	17	"Lucy in the Sky with Diamonds"	Standalone single	11 January 1975	4	
Elton John	17	"Philadelphia Freedom"	Standalone single	19 April 1975	2	
Elton John	17	"Don't Go Breaking My Heart" (with Kiki Dee)	Standalone single	21 August 1976	3	
Elton John	17	"Little Jeannie"	21 at 33	19 July 1980	2	
Elton John	17	"I'm Still Standing"	Too Low for Zero	16 July 1983	1	
Elton John	17	"I Don't Wanna Go on with You Like That"	Reg Strikes Back	13 August 1988	3	
Elton John	17	"You Gotta Love Someone"	Days of Thunder	26 January 1991	1	
Elton John	17	"Don't Let the Sun Go Down on Me" (with George Michael)	Standalone single	15 February 1992	3	
Elton John	17	"The One (Elton John song)"	The One	5 September 1992	2	
Elton John	17	"Can You Feel the Love Tonight"	The Lion King	8 August 1994	4	
Elton John	17	"Believe"	Made in England	17 April 1995	4	
Bee Gees	12	"Words"	Standalone single	9 March 1968	1	
Bee Gees	12	"I Started a Joke"	Idea	20 January 1969	2	
Bee Gees	12	"Lonely Days"	2 Years On	6 February 1971	1	
Bee Gees	12	"How Can You Mend a Broken Heart"	Trafalgar	28 August 1971	2	
Bee Gees	12	"Jive Talkin'"	Main Course	16 August 1975	1	
Bee Gees	12	"You Should Be Dancing"	Children of the World	11 September 1976	1	
Bee Gees	12	"How Deep Is Your Love"	Saturday Night Fever	24 December 1977	6	
Bee Gees	12	"Stayin' Alive"	Saturday Night Fever	18 February 1978	4	
Bee Gees	12	"Night Fever"	Saturday Night Fever	1 April 1978	5	
Bee Gees	12	"Too Much Heaven"	Spirits Having Flown	20 January 1979	3	
Bee Gees	12	"Tragedy"	Spirits Having Flown	24 March 1979	4	
Bee Gees	12	"Love You Inside Out"	Spirits Having Flown	23 June 1979	1	
Phil Collins	10	"Against All Odds (Take a Look at Me Now)"	Against All Odds	21 April 1984	4	
Phil Collins	10	"Easy Lover" (with Philip Bailey)	Chinese Wall	9 February 1985	2	
Phil Collins	10	"One More Night"	No Jacket Required	23 March 1985	1	
Phil Collins	10	"Separate Lives" (with Marilyn Martin)	White Nights	23 November 1985	2	
Phil Collins	10	"A Groovy Kind of Love"	Buster	29 October 1988	3	
Phil Collins	10	"Two Hearts"	Buster	21 January 1989	4	
Phil Collins	10	"Another Day in Paradise"	...But Seriously	16 December 1989	8	
Phil Collins	10	"I Wish It Would Rain Down"	...But Seriously	24 March 1990	6	
Phil Collins	10	"Do You Remember?"	...But Seriously	14 July 1990	1	
Phil Collins	10	"Something Happened on the Way to Heaven"	...But Seriously	13 October 1990	2	
Rod Stewart	10	"Maggie May"	Every Picture Tells a Story	9 October 1971	1	
Rod Stewart	10	"Tonight's the Night (Gonna Be Alright)"	A Night on the Town	27 November 1976	6	
Rod Stewart	10	"You're in My Heart (The Final Acclaim)"	Foot Loose & Fancy Free	4 February 1978	1	
Rod Stewart	10	"Da Ya Think I'm Sexy?"	Blondes Have More Fun	24 February 1979	4	
Rod Stewart	10	"Downtown Train"	The Best of Rod Stewart	10 February 1990	3	
Rod Stewart	10	"Rhythm of My Heart"	Vagabond Heart	25 May 1991	2	
Rod Stewart	10	"The Motown Song" (featuring The Temptations)	Vagabond Heart	5 October 1991	1	
Rod Stewart	10	"Have I Told You Lately"	Unplugged...and Seated	17 July 1993	1	
Rod Stewart	10	"All for Love" (with Bryan Adams and Sting)	The Three Musketeers	17 January 1994	5	
Rod Stewart	10	"Leave Virginia Alone"	A Spanner in the Works	3 July 1995	2	
Bryan Adams	10	"(Everything I Do) I Do It for You"	Robin Hood: Prince of Thieves	3 August 1991	9	
Bryan Adams	10	"Can't Stop This Thing We Started"	Waking Up the Neighbours	26 October 1991	4	
Bryan Adams	10	"Thought I'd Died and Gone to Heaven"	Waking Up the Neighbours	25 April 1992	1	
Bryan Adams	10	"Please Forgive Me"	So Far So Good	4 December 1993	6	
Bryan Adams	10	"All for Love" (with Rod Stewart and Sting)	The Three Musketeers	17 January 1994	5	
Bryan Adams	10	"Have You Ever Really Loved a Woman?"	Don Juan DeMarco	29 May 1995	5	
Bryan Adams	10	"The Only Thing That Looks Good on Me Is You"	18 til I Die	15 July 1996	1	
Bryan Adams	10	"Let's Make a Night to Remember"	18 til I Die	14 October 1996	2	
Bryan Adams	10	"Back to You"	Unplugged	19 January 1998	3	
Bryan Adams	10	"On a Day Like Today"	On a Day Like Today	2 November 1998	1	

== See also ==
- List of artists who reached number one on the Canadian Hot 100
- List of artists with the most UK singles chart number ones
