= Anthology (Bryan Adams album) =

Compilation album by Bryan Adams
- Released: October 18, 2005
- Recorded: 1978–2005
- Genres: Rock; soft rock
- Length: 155:57 (international edition)
- Label: Polydor
- Producers: Bryan Adams; Robert John "Mutt" Lange; Bob Clearmountain

Bryan Adams chronology
Colour Me Kubrick (2005)	Anthology (2005)	11 (2008)

Singles from Anthology
- 1. "When You're Gone" Released: 2006; 2. "So Far So Good" Released: 2006

Professional ratings
Review scores
Source	Rating
AllMusic	4.5/5 stars

Anthology is a compilation album by Canadian singer-songwriter Bryan Adams which contains songs he recorded from 1978 through 2005. The two-disc set includes songs from 1980 to 2005. A third disc which was a DVD live concert which was recorded in mid-2005 called Live in Lisbon was included in North America for a limited time. All the songs are in chronological order of their release, except the last song on the first disc on the North American edition, which was released in 1999. The album's enclosed booklet has notes about the process of the recordings and the credits for each track.

== Release and reception ==
Anthology, co-produced by Adams, Robert John "Mutt" Lange and Bob Clearmountain, peaked at number 65 on the Billboard 200. The album was released on October 18, 2005, peaking at number 4 on the Canadian Album Chart and at number 29 on the UK Albums Chart. It was certified two times platinum in Canada and gold in the United Kingdom.

== Version differences ==
On the first disc, the North American edition has "The Best of Me" as the last track, while the International edition moved the song to the second disc, and had "All I Want Is You" instead.

On the second disc, the North American edition has two songs from his album Room Service and a re-recorded version of "When You're Gone" with Pamela Anderson instead of Melanie C. While the international edition replaces the two Room Service Tracks with a new song "I'm Not the Man You Think I Am" (from the movie Colour Me Kubrick) and "Don't Give Up" (a collaboration with Chicane), and the original version of "When You're Gone" with Melanie C instead of the new version.

The original 2-disc North American edition was remastered and reissued September 18, 2007.

Anthology contains a new song, "So Far So Good". It appears as the final track on the second disc in the North American release of the album (and second-to-last in international versions). Originally this song was to be the final song of the album of the same name but was scrapped. According to the enclosed booklet of Anthology, "So Far So Good" was recorded in the same session as "Please Forgive Me" in 1993 and remained incomplete until the release of Anthology in 2005.

== Track listing ==
=== North American release ===
==== Disc one ====
No.	Title	Writer(s)	Length
1.	"Remember"	Bryan Adams, Jim Vallance	3:41
2.	"Lonely Nights"	Adams, Vallance	3:46
3.	"Straight from the Heart"	Adams, Eric Kagna	3:30
4.	"Cuts Like a Knife"	Adams, Vallance	5:16
5.	"This Time"	Adams, Vallance	3:18
6.	"Run to You"	Adams, Vallance	3:54
7.	"Somebody"	Adams, Vallance	4:44
8.	"Heaven"	Adams, Vallance	4:03
9.	"Summer of '69"	Adams, Vallance	3:35
10.	"One Night Love Affair"	Adams, Vallance	4:42
11.	"It's Only Love" (with Tina Turner)	Adams, Vallance	3:15
12.	"Heat of the Night"	Adams, Vallance	5:07
13.	"Hearts on Fire"	Adams, Vallance	3:30
14.	"(Everything I Do) I Do It for You"	Adams, Robert John "Mutt" Lange, Michael Kamen	6:34
15.	"Can't Stop This Thing We Started"	Adams, Lange	4:29
16.	"There Will Never Be Another Tonight"	Adams, Lange, Vallance	4:40
17.	"Thought I'd Died and Gone to Heaven"	Adams, Lange	5:48
18.	"The Best of Me"	Adams, Lange	3:33

==== Disc two ====
No.	Title	Writer(s)	Length
1.	"Please Forgive Me"	Adams, Lange	5:55
2.	"All for Love" (with Rod Stewart and Sting)	Adams, Lange, Kamen	4:46
3.	"Have You Ever Really Loved a Woman?"	Adams, Lange, Kamen	4:52
4.	"Rock Steady" (with Bonnie Raitt) (Live)	Adams, Gretchen Peters	4:05
5.	"The Only Thing That Looks Good on Me Is You"	Adams, Lange	3:37
6.	"Let's Make a Night to Remember"	Adams, Lange	6:19
7.	"Star"	Adams, Lange, Kamen	3:42
8.	"Back to You" (Live)	Adams, Eliot Kennedy	3:35
9.	"I'm Ready" (Live)	Adams, Vallance	4:42
10.	"On a Day Like Today"	Adams, Phil Thornalley	3:15
11.	"Cloud Number Nine" (Chicane Remix)	Adams, Max Martin, Peters	4:10
12.	"Here I Am"	Adams, Edward Elgar, Peters, Hans Zimmer	4:40
13.	"This Side of Paradise"	Adams, Peters	3:50
14.	"Why Do You Have to Be So Hard to Love?"	Adams, Peters	2:58
15.	"Open Road"	Adams, Kennedy	3:30
16.	"18 til I Die" (Live)	Adams, Lange	3:28
17.	"When You're Gone" (featuring Pamela Anderson)	Adams, Kennedy	3:24
18.	"So Far So Good"	Adams, Lange	3:47

=== International release ===
==== Disc one ====
No.	Title	Writer(s)	Length
1.	"Remember"	Adams, Vallance	3:41
2.	"Lonely Nights"	Adams, Vallance	3:46
3.	"Straight from the Heart"	Adams, Kagna	3:30
4.	"Cuts Like a Knife"	Adams, Vallance	5:16
5.	"This Time"	Adams, Vallance	3:18
6.	"Run to You"	Adams, Vallance	3:54
7.	"Somebody"	Adams, Vallance	4:44
8.	"Heaven"	Adams, Vallance	4:03
9.	"Summer of '69"	Adams, Vallance	3:35
10.	"One Night Love Affair"	Adams, Vallance	4:42
11.	"It's Only Love" (with Tina Turner)	Adams, Vallance	3:15
12.	"Heat of the Night"	Adams, Vallance	5:07
13.	"Hearts on Fire"	Adams, Vallance	3:30
14.	"(Everything I Do) I Do It for You"	Adams, Lange, Kamen	6:34
15.	"Can't Stop This Thing We Started"	Adams, Lange	4:29
16.	"There Will Never Be Another Tonight"	Adams, Lange, Vallance	4:40
17.	"Thought I'd Died and Gone to Heaven"	Adams, Lange	5:58
18.	"All I Want Is You"	Adams, Lange	5:20

==== Disc two ====
No.	Title	Writer(s)	Length
1.	"Please Forgive Me"	Adams, Lange	5:55
2.	"All for Love" (with Rod Stewart and Sting)	Adams, Lange, Kamen	4:46
3.	"Have You Ever Really Loved a Woman?"	Adams, Lange, Kamen	4:52
4.	"Rock Steady" (with Bonnie Raitt) (Live)	Adams, Peters	4:05
5.	"The Only Thing That Looks Good on Me Is You"	Adams, Lange	3:37
6.	"Let's Make a Night to Remember"	Adams, Lange	6:19
7.	"Star"	Adams, Lange	3:42
8.	"Back to You" (Live)	Adams, Kennedy	3:35
9.	"I'm Ready" (Live)	Adams, Vallance	4:42
10.	"On a Day Like Today"	Adams, Thornalley	3:15
11.	"When You're Gone" (featuring Melanie Chisholm)	Adams, Kennedy	3:24
12.	"Cloud Number Nine" (Chicane Mix)	Adams, Martin, Peters	4:10
13.	"The Best of Me"	Adams, Lange	3:33
14.	"Don't Give Up" (Original Radio Edit)	Adams, Nicholas Bracegirdle, Ray Hedges	3:41
15.	"Here I Am"	Adams, Zimmer, Peters	4:40
16.	"Open Road"	Adams, Kennedy	3:30
17.	"18 til I Die" (Live)	Adams, Lange	3:28
18.	"So Far So Good"	Adams, Lange	3:40
19.	"I'm Not the Man You Think I Am"	Adams, Peters	3:02

== Personnel ==
- Bryan Adams – rhythm guitar, vocals, co-producer
- Keith Scott – lead guitar
- Tommy Mandel – Hammond organ and keyboards
- Dave Taylor – bass guitar
- Mickey Curry – drums
- Jim Vallance – drums and percussion
- Robbie King – Hammond organ
- Larry Klein – bass guitar
- Bill Payne – piano and Hammond organ (on "Everything I Do")
- Ed Shearmur – keyboards (on "Everything I Do")
- Brian Stanley – bass guitar (on "Lonely Nights")
- James "Hutch" Hutchinson – bass (on "Please Forgive Me")
- Phil Nicholas – keyboards and programming (on "Waking Up the Neighbours")
- The Tuck Back Twins – background vocals
- Andrew Catlin – photography

== Certifications ==
Region	Certification	Certified units/sales
Canada (Music Canada)	2× Platinum	200,000^{^}
Germany (BVMI)	Gold	100,000^{‡}
Portugal (AFP)	Gold	10,000^{^}
United Kingdom (BPI)	Platinum	300,000^{^}
^{^} Shipments figures based on certification alone.^{‡} Sales+streaming figures based on certification alone.
