= So Far So Good (Bryan Adams album) =

Greatest hits album by Bryan Adams
- Released: November 9, 1993
- Recorded: 1982–1993
- Genre: Rock
- Length: 62:28
- Label: A&M
- Producers: Bryan Adams, Bob Clearmountain, Robert John "Mutt" Lange

Bryan Adams chronology
Waking Up the Neighbours (1991)	So Far So Good (1993)	18 Til I Die (1996)

Singles from So Far So Good
- 1. "Please Forgive Me" Released: October 18, 1993

Professional ratings
Review scores
Source	Rating
AllMusic	4.5/5 stars
Entertainment Weekly	B
MusicHound Rock	4/5 stars
Music Week	4/5 stars
The Rolling Stone Album Guide	3/5 stars
The Great Rock Discography	6/10

So Far So Good is a compilation album by Canadian rock musician Bryan Adams, released by A&M Records on November 9, 1993. The album reached number six on the Billboard 200 in 1994 and was a number one hit in the United Kingdom and many other countries.

The album contains songs from Cuts Like a Knife (1983) to Waking Up the Neighbours (1991), and a new single, "Please Forgive Me". Originally, the song "So Far So Good" was going to be included on the album so the album started and finished with a new song but it was dropped. The song was included on disc two of Anthology.

The only song on the album that has never been released as a single is "Kids Wanna Rock" from Reckless (1984), which replaced "One Night Love Affair", taken from the same album. Although the latter had been released as a single in 1985, charting in Canada, the United States and Japan, "Kids Wanna Rock" proved to be a popular live staple during Adams' world tours. In fact, various live recordings of "Kids Wanna Rock" were issued as B-sides between 1984 and 1992. Other notable singles that were left off include the single "Christmas Time" which charted in several countries in 1985, "Hearts on Fire" and "Victim of Love" from 1987, the moderately successful "Thought I'd Died and Gone to Heaven" from 1991, and the 1992 US single "Touch the Hand". Early versions of the album had a circular black sticker on the jewel case, covering the wheel, featuring the text "The Best of Bryan Adams" in red letters. Also, the album cover was available in different colour schemes, varying from dark green, to light brown and bright orange. The album has been repackaged several times; some versions include the CD single of "Have You Ever Really Loved a Woman?" from 1995 included alongside the album in a cardboard box.

So Far So Good is his best selling record in many countries, with sales exceeding 13 million copies worldwide.

== Track listing ==
All tracks are written by Bryan Adams and Jim Vallance, except where noted.

No.	Title	Writer(s)	Original album	Length
1.	"Summer of '69"		Reckless (1984)	3:35
2.	"Straight from the Heart"	Adams; Eric Kagna	Cuts Like a Knife (1983)	3:30
3.	"It's Only Love" (with Tina Turner)		Reckless (1984)	3:15
4.	"Can't Stop This Thing We Started"	Adams; Robert John "Mutt" Lange	Waking Up the Neighbours (1991)	4:29
5.	"Do I Have to Say the Words?"	Adams; Lange; Vallance	Waking Up the Neighbours (1991)	6:11
6.	"This Time"		Cuts Like a Knife (1983)	3:18
7.	"Run to You"		Reckless (1984)	3:54
8.	"Heaven"		Reckless (1984)	4:03
9.	"Cuts Like a Knife"		Cuts Like a Knife (1983)	5:12
10.	"(Everything I Do) I Do It for You"	Adams; Lange; Michael Kamen	Waking Up the Neighbours (1991)	6:34
11.	"Somebody"		Reckless (1984)	4:44
12.	"Kids Wanna Rock"		Reckless (1984)	2:36
13.	"Heat of the Night"		Into the Fire (1987)	5:06
14.	"Please Forgive Me"	Adams; Lange	Previously unreleased	5:55

== So Far So Good (And More) ==
A VHS video compilation titled So Far So Good (And More) was released on March 22, 1994, and contains eighteen videos, including some musical videos of songs that were not included in the CD album.

=== Track listing ===
1. "Can't Stop This Thing We Started"
2. "Cuts Like a Knife"
3. "Please Forgive Me"
4. "It's Only Love"
5. "Into the Fire"
6. "Heat of the Night"
7. "Heaven"
8. "Somebody"
9. "(Everything I Do) I Do It for You"
10. "Diana"
11. "When the Night Comes"
12. "I Fought the Law"
13. "Straight from the Heart"
14. "Run to You"
15. "C'mon Everybody"
16. "Summer of '69"
17. "Do I Have to Say the Words?"
18. "All for Love"

== Charts ==
=== Weekly charts ===
Weekly chart performance for So Far So Good
Chart (1993–96)	Peak position
Australian Albums (ARIA)	1
Austrian Albums (Ö3 Austria)	1
Belgian Albums (Ultratop Flanders)	13
Canada Top Albums/CDs (RPM)	2
Dutch Albums (Album Top 100)	1
Finnish Albums (Suomen virallinen lista)	1
European Albums (Music & Media)	1
French Albums (SNEP)	5
German Albums (Offizielle Top 100)	1
Hungarian Albums (MAHASZ)	9
New Zealand Albums (RMNZ)	1
Norwegian Albums (VG-lista)	1
Portuguese Albums (AFP)	1
Spanish Albums (AFYVE)	3
Swedish Albums (Sverigetopplistan)	1
Swiss Albums (Schweizer Hitparade)	1
UK Albums (Official Charts)	1
UK Rock Albums (Music Week)	1
US Billboard 200	6

=== Year-end charts ===
1993 year-end chart performance for So Far So Good
Chart (1993)	Position
Australian Albums (ARIA)	2
Canada Top Albums/CDs (RPM)	44
Dutch Albums (Album Top 100)	88
European Albums (European Top 100 Albums)	100
German Albums (Offizielle Top 100)	90
New Zealand Albums (RMNZ)	19
UK Albums (OCC)	6

1994 year-end chart performance for So Far So Good
Chart (1994)	Position
Australian Albums (ARIA)	2
Austrian Albums (Ö3 Austria)	3
Canada Top Albums/CDs (RPM)	15
Dutch Albums (Album Top 100)	16
European Albums (European Top 100 Albums)	1
German Albums (Offizielle Top 100)	2
New Zealand Albums (RMNZ)	14
Swiss Albums (Schweizer Hitparade)	2
UK Albums (OCC)	45
US Billboard 200	17

1995 year-end chart performance for So Far So Good
Chart (1995)	Position
Belgian Albums (Ultratop Flanders)	50

=== Decade-end charts ===
Decade-end chart performance for So Far So Good
Chart (1990s)	Position
Australian Albums (ARIA)	46

== Certifications ==
Certifications and sales for So Far So Good
Region	Certification	Certified units/sales
Australia (ARIA)	14× Platinum	980,000^{‡}
Austria (IFPI Austria)	2× Platinum	100,000^{*}
Belgium (BRMA)	4× Platinum	200,000^{*}
Brazil (Pro-Música Brasil)	Gold	100,000^{*}
Canada (Music Canada)	6× Platinum	600,000^{^}
Finland (Musiikkituottajat)	Platinum	77,318
France (SNEP)	Platinum	300,000^{*}
Germany (BVMI)	2× Platinum	1,000,000^{^}
Italy	—	700,000
Japan (RIAJ)	Gold	100,000^{^}
Malaysia	—	60,000
Netherlands (NVPI)	2× Platinum	200,000^{^}
New Zealand (RMNZ)	Platinum	15,000^{^}
Norway (IFPI Norway)	3× Platinum	150,000^{*}
Singapore	—	100,000
Sweden (GLF)	Gold	250,000
Spain (Promusicae)	Platinum	100,000^{^}
Switzerland (IFPI Switzerland)	4× Platinum	200,000^{^}
United Kingdom (BPI)	3× Platinum	900,000^{^}
United Kingdom (BPI) VHS release	Gold	25,000^{*}
United States (RIAA)	5× Platinum	5,000,000^{^}
Summaries
Europe (IFPI)	6× Platinum	6,000,000^{*}
Southeast Asia	—	1,700,000
Worldwide	—	13,000,000
^{*} Sales figures based on certification alone.^{^} Shipments figures based on certification alone.^{‡} Sales+streaming figures based on certification alone.

== See also ==
- List of best-selling albums in Australia
