= Live! Live! Live! =

Live album by Bryan Adams
- Released: 1988
- Recorded: 3 July 1988
- Venue: Rock Werchter, Belgium
- Genre: Classic rock, hard rock
- Length: 69:40
- Label: A&M
- Producer: Bryan Adams

Bryan Adams chronology
Into the Fire (1987)	Live! Live! Live! (1988)	Waking Up the Neighbours (1991)

Professional ratings
Review scores
Source	Rating
AllMusic	2/5 stars
Entertainment Weekly	B
Music Week	3/5 stars
The Rolling Stone Album Guide	3/5 stars
Smash Hits	3/5 stars

Live! Live! Live! is a live album released by Bryan Adams through A&M Records in 1988. It was recorded live at the Rock Werchter festival on 3 July 1988 in Werchter, Belgium. One track, "Into the Fire", was recorded live in Tokyo. The album sold over 1 million copies.
The concert was taped while it "rained in torrents". At the end of It's Only Love, Adams comments to the audience, "I've got to tell you something. For you people to sit out in the rain, means you're one hell of an audience. I mean, to sit out in this..."

== Track listing ==
All tracks are written by Bryan Adams and Jim Vallance, except where noted.

No.	Title	Length
1.	"She's Only Happy When She's Dancin'"	3:30
2.	"It's Only Love"	3:51
3.	"Cuts Like A Knife"	3:54
4.	"Kids Wanna Rock"	3:03
5.	"Hearts on Fire"	4:11
6.	"Take Me Back"	5:31
7.	"The Best Was Yet to Come"	2:53
8.	"Heaven"	4:17
9.	"Heat of the Night"	5:17
10.	"Run to You"	4:07
11.	"One Night Love Affair"	4:33
12.	"Long Gone"	4:07
13.	"Summer of '69"	4:33
14.	"Somebody"	5:49
15.	"Walkin' After Midnight" (Alan Block, Donn Hecht)	2:19
16.	"I Fought the Law" (Sonny Curtis)	2:38
17.	"Into the Fire"	3:35

== Certifications ==
Region	Certification	Certified units/sales
Canada (Music Canada)	Gold	50,000^{^}
New Zealand (RMNZ)	Gold	7,500^{^}
United Kingdom (BPI)	Silver	60,000^{*}
^{*} Sales figures based on certification alone.^{^} Shipments figures based on certification alone.
