= Do I Have to Say the Words? =

1992 single by Bryan Adams

Single by Bryan Adams

from the album Waking Up the Neighbours
- Released: July 1992
- Genre: Rock
- Length: 6:11 (album version); 4:15 (single/video version)
- Label: A&M
- Songwriters: Bryan Adams; Robert Lange; Jim Vallance
- Producers: Bryan Adams; Robert John "Mutt" Lange

Bryan Adams singles chronology
"All I Want Is You" (1991)	"Do I Have to Say the Words?" (1992)	"Touch the Hand" (1992)

Music video
- "Do I Have to Say the Words?" on YouTube

"Do I Have to Say the Words?" is a song by Canadian singer and songwriter Bryan Adams from his sixth studio album, Waking Up the Neighbours (1991). It was written and produced by Adams and Robert John "Mutt" Lange, with Jim Vallance serving as its co-writer. It was released in July 1992 by A&M Records as the sixth single from the album. "Do I Have to Say the Words?" is a mid-tempo rock ballad with guitar riffs and soft synths in its instrumentation, while Adams gives a dramatic vocal delivery.

"Do I Have to Say the Words?" received generally positive reviews from music critics, who praised it for being a beautiful ballad and Adams for his vocal delivery. Commercially, it was successful in North America, reaching number two in Canada and number eleven on the US Billboard Hot 100. Elsewhere, it peaked modestly, reaching the top-forty in three other countries. The accompanying music video was directed by Anton Corbijn and filmed in Turkey and Iceland. "Do I Have to Say the Words?" was also included on some of Adams' compilations.

== Composition and reception ==
"Do I Have to Say the Words?" was written and produced by Bryan Adams and Robert John "Mutt" Lange, with Jim Vallance as a co-writer. The track began life in September 1987 as an Adams/Vallance composition called "Rescue Me", which was recorded in July 1988 with producer Steve Lillywhite but discarded. "Rescue Me" was a mid-tempo song that Jim Vallance has described as "U2 inspired". During the recording sessions for Waking Up the Neighbours, Mutt Lange radically re-wrote the song, switching the chorus to become the verse, slowing the tempo to create a rock ballad and adding a new chorus, resulting in the new track "Do I Have to Say the Words?". According to the sheet music published at Musicnotes.com by Universal Music Publishing Group, it is written in the key of G major with a rock ballad tempo of 72 beats per minute in common time. The mid-tempo ballad features guitar riffs and "cushiony" synths as its instrumentation, while Adams delivers a dramatic vocal. In a part of the chorus, he "whines", "Do I have to tell the truth?"

Larry Flick of Billboard magazine called it a "charming rock ballad", where Adams "returns to the pensive, romantic tone of his record-breaking hit '(Everything I Do) I Do It for You'." Flick noted that the singer "excels at laying agile [instrumentation] for his gravelly, dramatic vocal delivery." David Hiltbrand and Craig Tomashoff of People named it the best of the ballads on the album. James Hunter of Rolling Stone named it a moodier "eloquent mall ballad," while Jan DeKnock of Chicago Tribune noted that "he really does shine brightest on [the] beautifully bittersweet [ballad]."

== Music video ==
The music video for "Do I Have to Say the Words?" was directed by Dutch director Anton Corbijn and was mainly shot in Istanbul, Turkey on July 28, 1992. The video marked the first outdoor stadium show in Istanbul history, with over 20,000 concertgoers in İnönü Stadium. Part of the video was filmed in Iceland with the female character.

== Track listings ==
- US cassette single
1. "Do I Have to Say the Words?" (edit) – 4:18
2. "Cuts Like a Knife" (live) – 5:36
- UK and European 7-inch single
1. "Do I Have to Say the Words?" (edit)
2. "Summer of '69" (live)
- UK and European CD single
1. "Do I Have to Say the Words?"
2. "Summer of '69" (live)
3. "Kids Wanna Rock" (live)
4. "Can't Stop This Thing We Started" (live)

== Charts ==
=== Weekly charts ===
Chart (1992–1993)	Peak position
Australia (ARIA)	61
Belgium (Ultratop 50 Flanders)	30
Canada Top Singles (RPM)	2
Canada Adult Contemporary (RPM)	3
Europe (Eurochart Hot 100)	58
Germany (GfK)	75
Netherlands (Dutch Top 40)	39
Netherlands (Single Top 100)	34
UK Singles (Official Charts)	30
UK Airplay (Music Week)	20
US Billboard Hot 100	11
US Adult Contemporary (Billboard)	5
US Pop Airplay (Billboard)	3
US Cash Box Top 100	8

=== Year-end charts ===
Chart (1992)	Position
Canada Top Singles (RPM)	17
Canada Adult Contemporary (RPM)	19
US Billboard Hot 100	70
US Adult Contemporary (Billboard)	44

== Release history ==
Region	Date	Format(s)	Label(s)	Ref.
United States	July 1991	Cassette	A&M	
United Kingdom	September 14, 1992	7-inch vinyl; CD; cassette	A&M	
Australia	November 23, 1992	CD; cassette	A&M; Polydor	
Japan	December 21, 1992	Mini-CD	A&M	
