= Please Forgive Me =

1993 single by Bryan Adams

Single by Bryan Adams

from the album So Far So Good
- Released: October 15, 1993
- Genre: Soft rock
- Length: 5:55
- Label: A&M
- Songwriters: Bryan Adams; Robert Lange
- Producers: Bryan Adams; Robert Lange

Bryan Adams singles chronology
"Touch the Hand" (1992)	"Please Forgive Me" (1993)	"All for Love" (1993)

Music video
- "Please Forgive Me" on YouTube

"Please Forgive Me" is a song by Canadian rock musician Bryan Adams. It was released in October 1993, by A&M Records, as the only single and bonus track from his first greatest hits compilation album, So Far So Good (1993). The single reached number seven on the US Billboard Hot 100 and number two on the Billboard Adult Contemporary chart. In the United Kingdom, "Please Forgive Me" peaked at number two on the UK Singles Chart. It is Adams' only Australian number-one single not written for a motion picture, and it also topped the charts of Belgium, Canada, France, Ireland, Norway, Peru, and Portugal. The accompanying music video was directed by Andrew Catlin and filmed in a recording studio, featuring a dog.

== Background ==
"Please Forgive Me" was written by Adams and producer Robert Lange. The song has an instrumental intro, which is only found on the album version of the song. Adams told Songfacts that it was one of the first songs that he agreed to use a modulation in.

The single reached number two in the United Kingdom, number seven in the US, and number one in Australia, Belgium, Canada, Ireland, Norway and Portugal. The song was praised by critics upon its release, and gave Adams one of his best chart performances, his most highly successful being the 1991 international chart-topping hit "(Everything I Do) I Do It for You". The song helped So Far So Good reach number one on the UK Albums Chart and in Canada and Australia.

The studio band, who also appear in the video which was filmed live during the tracking dates, included keyboard players David Paich and Robbie Buchanan, guitarist Shane Fontayne, bassist James "Hutch" Hutchinson, guitarist Keith Scott, drummer Mickey Curry and producer Mutt Lange. The song was co-written and produced by Mutt Lange. It was a radio hit all over the world, and became a hit amongst Adams fans. The single has sold over three million copies worldwide.

== Critical reception ==
Larry Flick from Billboard magazine felt the song "casts him in a familiar role: mournful romantic", and stated that the "guitar-framed rock ballad is an easy smash, thanks to Adams' friendly, world-weathered rasp, and an infectious chorus." He also described it as a "stately tune" and a "delicious hit of ear candy." Dave Sholin from the Gavin Report commented, "Among rock's most talented balladeers, Adams once again collaborates with "Mutt" Lange on a sensational production." Liverpool Echo named the song "another husky ballad with the kind of simple structure and simple sentiment which should ensure the widest appeal." Pan-European magazine Music & Media wrote that it is a "unmistakably part of the Adams' family of great rock ballads." Pete Stanton from Smash Hits gave "Please Forgive Me" a score of two out of five, feeling that it "treads the same path" as '(Everything I Do) I Do It for You', "but doesn't grab the heartstrings in the same way. The throaty vocals are still there".

== Music video ==
The accompanying music video for "Please Forgive Me" was directed by English photographer, artist, director, cinematographer and filmmaker Andrew Catlin. It was filmed in a recording studio and features Adams, his band and a German shepherd dog. Adams and his bandmates befriended the dog—who belonged to the studio owner—whilst recording the track. The video also received a large amount of TV airplay. The video for Adams' 2008 single "I Thought I'd Seen Everything" resembles the music video.

== Track listing ==
No.	Title	Length
1.	"Please Forgive Me" (radio mix)	5:01
2.	"Can't Stop This Thing We Started" (live)	5:00
3.	"There Will Never Be Another Tonight" (live)	5:34
4.	"C'mon Everybody" (live)	4:08

== Charts ==
=== Weekly charts ===
Chart (1993–1994)	Peak position
Australia (ARIA)	1
Austria (Ö3 Austria Top 40)	2
Belgium (Ultratop 50 Flanders)	1
Canada Retail Singles (The Record)	1
Canada Top Singles (RPM)	1
Canada Adult Contemporary (RPM)	3
Denmark (IFPI)	2
Europe (Eurochart Hot 100)	2
Europe (European AC Radio)	1
Europe (European Hit Radio)	1
Finland (Suomen virallinen lista)	2
France (SNEP)	1
Germany (GfK)	3
Iceland (Íslenski Listinn Topp 40)	2
Ireland (IRMA)	1
Italy (Musica e dischi)	3
Lithuania (M-1)	1
Netherlands (Dutch Top 40)	3
Netherlands (Single Top 100)	3
New Zealand (Recorded Music NZ)	7
Norway (VG-lista)	1
Panama (UPI)	2
Peru (UPI)	1
Portugal (AFP)	1
Sweden (Sverigetopplistan)	2
Switzerland (Schweizer Hitparade)	2
UK Singles (Official Charts)	2
UK Airplay (Music Week)	1
US Billboard Hot 100	7
US Adult Contemporary (Billboard)	2
US Pop Airplay (Billboard)	2
US Rhythmic Airplay (Billboard)	39
US Cash Box Top 100	3
Zimbabwe (ZIMA)	4

=== Year-end charts ===
Chart (1993)	Position
Australia (ARIA)	10
Belgium (Ultratop 50 Flanders)	74
Canada Top Singles (RPM)	37
Canada Adult Contemporary (RPM)	68
Europe (Eurochart Hot 100)	35
Germany (Media Control)	94
Iceland (Íslenski Listinn Topp 40)	64
Netherlands (Dutch Top 40)	61
Netherlands (Single Top 100)	90
Sweden (Topplistan)	14
UK Singles (OCC)	15
UK Airplay (Music Week)	15

Chart (1994)	Position
Australia (ARIA)	8
Austria (Ö3 Austria Top 40)	23
Belgium (Ultratop 50 Flanders)	32
Brazil (Crowley)	79
Canada Top Singles (RPM)	11
Canada Adult Contemporary (RPM)	22
Europe (Eurochart Hot 100)	13
Europe (European Hit Radio)	21
France (SNEP)	40
Germany (Media Control)	47
Netherlands (Dutch Top 40)	70
Netherlands (Single Top 100)	99
Sweden (Topplistan)	61
Switzerland (Schweizer Hitparade)	35
US Billboard Hot 100	27
US Adult Contemporary (Billboard)	5
US Cash Box Top 100	27

=== Decade-end charts ===
Chart (1990–1999)	Position
Belgium (Ultratop Flanders)	10
Canada (Nielsen SoundScan)	43

== Certifications ==
Region	Certification	Certified units/sales
Australia (ARIA)	2× Platinum	140,000^{^}
Austria (IFPI Austria)	Gold	25,000^{*}
Brazil (Pro-Música Brasil)	2× Platinum	120,000^{‡}
Germany (BVMI)	Gold	250,000^{^}
New Zealand (RMNZ)	Gold	15,000^{‡}
Sweden (GLF)	Gold	25,000^{^}
United Kingdom (BPI)	Gold	400,000^{^}
^{*} Sales figures based on certification alone.^{^} Shipments figures based on certification alone.^{‡} Sales+streaming figures based on certification alone.

== Release history ==
Region	Date	Format(s)	Label(s)	Ref.
Europe	October 15, 1993	CD	A&M	
United Kingdom	October 18, 1993	7-inch vinyl; CD; cassette	A&M	
Japan	December 20, 1993	Mini-CD	A&M	
