= Heat of the Night =

Single by Bryan Adams

from the album Into the Fire
- B-side: "Another Day"
- Released: March 13, 1987
- Recorded: September 12, 1986
- Genre: Rock
- Length: 4:52 (album version); 6:25 (extended version)
- Label: A&M
- Songwriters: Bryan Adams, Jim Vallance
- Producers: Bryan Adams, Bob Clearmountain

Bryan Adams singles chronology
"Christmas Time" (1985)	"Heat of the Night" (1987)	"Hearts on Fire" (1987)

"Heat of the Night" is a song written by Canadian rock musician Bryan Adams and Jim Vallance and performed by Adams. The song became the most successful song from Adams's album Into the Fire in 1987. It was released as the first single from Into the Fire and reached number 6 on the U.S. Billboard Hot 100 and number 2 on the U.S. Mainstream Rock Tracks chart.

The song is also featured on Adams's 1988 live concert album Live! Live! Live! and his greatest hits albums So Far So Good and Anthology.

The song is very popular among Bryan Adams fans and it won Canadian Music Publisher's Association Rock Song Of The Year Award. According to Billboard magazine, it was the 84th most-listened-to song of the year.

It was also notable for being the first song to be released as a cassette single in North America.

== Background ==
The song was partly inspired by the film noir classic The Third Man, starring the actor-director Orson Welles. The darkness of the lyrics was further influenced by a trip Bryan and Jim Vallance took to Berlin in March 1986, before the wall came down.

== Music video ==
The promo was directed by Wayne Isham and shot in black and white; it was also one of the rare songs/videos where Bryan himself plays lead guitar, instead of Keith Scott to whom he usually leaves the solo work.

A shot from recording sessions is used as the cover of Adams's album Into the Fire.

== Personnel ==
Personnel taken from Into the Fire liner notes.

- Bryan Adams – lead and gang vocals, lead and rhythm guitar
- Keith Scott – guitar harmonics, gang vocals
- Dave Taylor – bass
- Mickey Curry – drums

Additional musicians

- Robbie King – organ
- Jim Vallance – piano, percussion

== Chart positions ==
Chart (1987)	Peak position
Australia (ARIA)	25
Belgium (Ultratop 50 Flanders)	35
Canada RPM Top Singles	7
Canada (The Record)	4
Europe (European Top 100)	79
Finland (Suomen virallinen lista)	20
Germany (GfK)	33
Netherlands (Dutch Top 40)	21
Netherlands (Single Top 100)	34
New Zealand (Recorded Music NZ)	20
Norway (VG-lista)	6
Sweden (Sverigetopplistan)	7
Switzerland (Schweizer Hitparade)	17
UK Singles Chart (The Official Charts Company)	50
US Billboard Hot 100	6
US Billboard Rock Tracks	2

Year-end chart (1987)	Position
US Top Pop Singles (Billboard)	84
