= There Will Never Be Another Tonight =

1991 single by Bryan Adams

Single by Bryan Adams

from the album Waking Up the Neighbours
- Released: November 11, 1991
- Genre: Rock
- Length: 4:40
- Label: A&M
- Songwriters: Bryan Adams; Jim Vallance; Robert Lange
- Producers: Robert Lange; Bryan Adams

Bryan Adams singles chronology
"Can't Stop This Thing We Started" (1991)	"There Will Never Be Another Tonight" (1991)	"Thought I'd Died and Gone to Heaven" (1992)

Music video
- "There Will Never Be Another Tonight" on YouTube

"There Will Never Be Another Tonight" is a song written by Canadian musician Bryan Adams, Robert Lange, and Jim Vallance for Adams sixth studio album, Waking Up the Neighbours (1991). It was the third single released from the album, in November 1991 by A&M Records. The song peaked at number two on Canada's RPM 100 Hit Tracks chart, number six on the US Billboard Album Rock Tracks chart, and number 31 on the Billboard Hot 100. The song has only appeared on one compilation album released by Adams: Anthology (2005). Starting in 2009, the song is used as the opening theme song for the CBC reality competition, Battle of the Blades.

== Writing and recording ==
The song was produced by Mutt Lange and Bryan Adams and was recorded by Nigel Green at Battery Studios, London, and by Ken Lomas at Warehouse Studios, Vancouver. It was mixed by Bob Clearmountain at Mayfair Studios, London.

Vallance's involvement was minimal on "There Will Never Be Another Tonight", although the song started as a musical idea written in 1988 or '89 by both Adams and Vallance. The demo got the title "Buddy Holly Idea" since it is vaguely reminiscent of the Buddy Holly song "Peggy Sue". Lange and Adams further developed the demo into a finished song.

== Chart performance ==
In the United States, the song reached the top forty on the Billboard Hot 100, and the following week it debuted on the Billboard Album Rock Tracks chart at 6. In Canada, it peaked on the RPM Top singles chart at number two, becoming the first single from the album to not top the listing.

The song was released in Australia, Europe, and New Zealand in 1991. "(Everything I Do) I Do It for You" (Waking Up the Neighbours' first single) and "Can't Stop This Thing We Started" reached the UK top five. "There Will Never Be Another Tonight" continued the trend of lower-charting singles when it debuted and peaked at number 31 on the UK Singles Chart. Although "There Will Never Be Another Tonight" reached the top twenty in Ireland, it was a moderate top thirty success in the Netherlands and the top thirty in Australia and Sweden.

== Music videos ==
The music video for "There Will Never Be Another Tonight" was directed by Irish-British filmmaker Steve Barron and shot at Sheffield Arena. Actress Rachel Weisz can be seen in audience.

== Track listing ==
- CD single
1. "There Will Never Be Another Tonight"
2. "One Night Love Affair" (live in Brussels, Belgium)
3. "Into the Fire" (live in Tokyo, Japan)

== Personnel ==
- Bryan Adams – rhythm guitar, vocals and backing vocals
- Keith Scott – lead guitar, backing vocals
- Robbie King – organ
- Phil Nichols – keyboards and programming
- Dave Taylor – bass
- Mickey Curry – drums
- Mutt Lange – backing vocals

== Charts ==
=== Weekly charts ===
Chart (1991–1992)	Peak position
Australia (ARIA)	30
Belgium (Ultratop 50 Flanders)	17
Canada Top Singles (RPM)	2
Europe (Eurochart Hot 100)	49
Europe (European Hit Radio)	19
Ireland (IRMA)	11
Luxembourg (Radio Luxembourg)	14
Netherlands (Dutch Top 40)	27
Netherlands (Single Top 100)	29
New Zealand (Recorded Music NZ)	21
Portugal (AFP)	10
Sweden (Sverigetopplistan)	33
UK Singles (Official Charts)	32
UK Airplay (Music Week)	5
US Billboard Hot 100	31
US Mainstream Rock (Billboard)	6
US Cash Box Top 100	8

=== Year-end charts ===
Chart (1992)	Position
Canada Top Singles (RPM)	34
US Album Rock Tracks (Billboard)	40

== Release history ==
Region	Date	Format(s)	Label(s)	Ref.
United Kingdom	November 11, 1991	7-inch vinyl; CD; cassette	A&M	
Australia	December 9, 1991	CD; cassette	A&M	
Japan	December 15, 1991	Mini-CD	A&M	
