= Into the Fire (album) =

Studio album by Bryan Adams
- Released: 30 March 1987
- Recorded: 16 August–24 October 1986
- Genre: Rock
- Length: 44:53
- Label: A&M
- Producers: Bryan Adams; Bob Clearmountain

Bryan Adams chronology
Reckless (1984)	Into the Fire (1987)	Waking Up the Neighbours (1991)

Singles from Into the Fire
- 1. "Heat of the Night" Released: March 1987; 2. "Hearts on Fire" Released: May 1987; 3. "Victim of Love" Released: August 1987; 4. "Only the Strong Survive" Released: 1987 (CAN)

Into the Fire is the fifth studio album by the Canadian rock singer Bryan Adams. It was co-written by Jim Vallance. It was released in March 1987 by A&M Records as the follow-up album to the chart-topping Reckless (1984). Into the Fire peaked at number seven on the US Billboard 200 chart and reached the Top 10 in several other nations. Six singles were released from the album: "Heat of the Night", "Hearts on Fire", "Victim of Love", "Only the Strong Survive", "Into the Fire" and "Another Day".

== Music ==
=== Recording and production ===
The recording for Into the Fire started on 16 August 1986 and finished on 24 October. It was recorded at a studio set up in Adams' home in Vancouver, British Columbia. Adams and his backing band, which consisted of Keith Scott, Mickey Curry, Dave Taylor and Tommy Mandel, used the dining room, bathroom and bedroom to isolate the different instruments. The studio was named Cliffhanger since Adams' house was close to the sea. "Heat of the Night" was recorded 12 September 1986. "Hearts on Fire" was originally written for Reckless in 1984, but was recorded on 1 September 1986. "Hearts on Fire" was mixed in London, England on 11 January.

By the time Into the Fire was completed, Adams and Vallance were satisfied with only two songs: The dark "Victim of Love" and the upbeat "Hearts on Fire". A possible influence on the album was Adams' involvement of the six-city "Amnesty International Conspiracy of Hope" tour in 1986. Adams says in the "Into the Fire" songbook that the album's title track refers to a man who is at a crossroads and does not quite know what to do with his life, which is how Adams felt when he started recording the album after the massive success of Reckless.

== Release and reception ==
Professional ratings
Review scores
Source	Rating
AllMusic	2/5 stars
The Encyclopedia of Popular Music	3/5 stars
Los Angeles Times	3/4
MusicHound Rock	2/5 stars
Pittsburgh Post-Gazette	C+
The Rolling Stone Album Guide	2/5 stars
The Village Voice	C+

The album was released on 30 March 1987 and featured the singles "Heat of the Night" and "Hearts on Fire". Though commercially successful, peaking at number seven on the Billboard 200, the expectations for Into The Fire were set by the overwhelming success of Adams' previous number one hit album Reckless. That album had sold over 12 million; in that context Into the Fire, which sold over 2 million copies worldwide at its time of release, was viewed as a commercial failure.

As Adams said:

"I have to laugh when the press say that LP didn't do well because it did as well as Cuts Like a Knife, but I suppose the perception was it wasn't Reckless II! Who cares? There were some songs that were slightly different than what we had written before ... some were, let's say, slightly more exploratory than we'd written in the past. Vallance was up for the songwriting challenge of not repeating Reckless."

Critical reception was generally unfavourable, with the album's lyrics being particularly singled out as substandard. Robert Christgau knocked Into The Fire for its "dumbness density", noting that he counted "an astonishing fifty-six full-fledged clichés on what's supposed to be a significance move."

Steve Hochman of Rolling Stone expressed similar sentiments:

"Adams shows that he has a will to speak but nothing in particular to say....a scan of the song titles ("Heat of the Night," "Only the Strong Survive," "Into the Fire" and so on) shows that the best Adams and co-writer Jim Vallance could come up with was a series of clichés.

... Worse are the vague pro-Native American message of "Native Son" and the antiwar message of "Remembrance Day," the lyrics of which read like earnest but clumsy high-school poetry.

A retrospective review from Eduardo Rivera at AllMusic characterized most of the album's songs as "lifeless and dull", with some even being called "depressing", "ugly" or "truly awful". Only "Hearts on Fire" met with Rivera's critical approval.

"Heat of the Night" was the debut single from Into the Fire and was released worldwide in March 1987. In the US, the song ascended to number 2 on the US Billboard Mainstream Rock Tracks chart and at number 6 on the Billboard Hot 100. "Heat of the Night" reached number 7 on the Canadian singles chart and remained in the top ten for five weeks. In Canada, the compact disc release became the first by a Canadian artist to earn a Gold certification (sales of 50,000), and only the second overall following Brothers in Arms by Dire Straits. "Heat of the Night" was released the following month in the UK and peaked in the top 50 on the UK Singles Chart at 50, and was Adams' only single from Into the Fire to chart in mainland Europe. "Heat of the Night" was eventually nominated for a Canadian Juno Award for Single of the Year in 1987.

"Hearts on Fire" was the second single from Into the Fire. The song become a minor hit at its time of release. The song peaked at number 26 on the Hot 100 chart and at number 3 on the Mainstream Rock Tracks chart while reaching number 25 in Canada.

"Victim of Love" and "Only the Strong Survive" would be the two follow-up singles to "Hearts on Fire". These singles became minor hits with "Victim of Love" reaching number 10 on the Mainstream Rock Tracks chart, number 32 on the Hot 100 and number 49 on the Canadian Singles chart. "Only the Strong Survive" reached number 47 in Canada. "Another Day", which was released as the B-side to "In the Heat of Night", peaked at number 33 on the Mainstream Rock Tracks chart. The title track also received airplay on American album-oriented rock radio stations and reached number 6 on the Mainstream Rock Tracks chart.

"Native Son" was covered by Dan Ar Braz on his 1991 album Frontières de sel.

== Track listing ==
All tracks are written by Bryan Adams and Jim Vallance, except where noted.

Side one
No.	Title	Length
1.	"Heat of the Night"	4:52
2.	"Into the Fire"	4:41
3.	"Victim of Love"	4:07
4.	"Another Day"	3:41
5.	"Native Son"	6:04

Side two
No.	Title	Length
6.	"Only the Strong Survive"	3:45
7.	"Rebel"	4:02
8.	"Remembrance Day"	5:59
9.	"Hearts on Fire"	3:30
10.	"Home Again"	4:18
Total length:		44:53

2012 Japan SHM-CD bonus tracks
No.	Title	Writer(s)	Length
11.	"Heat of the Night" (from Live! Live! Live!)		5:22
12.	"Hearts on Fire" (from Live! Live! Live!)		4:12
13.	"Run Rudolph Run"	Johnny Marks; Marvin Brodie	2:43
Total length:			57:33

== Personnel ==
Personnel taken from Into the Fire liner notes.

- Bryan Adams – lead vocals, rhythm guitars (1, 2, 4–10), keyboards (7, 10), gang vocals (1, 8), lead guitar (1, 4), piano (5, 8)
- Keith Scott – lead guitar (2, 3, 5, 7–10), rhythm guitars (5, 7–10), gang vocals (1, 8), guitar harmonics (1), harmony guitar (4), slide guitar (6)
- Dave Taylor – bass
- Mickey Curry – drums

Additional musicians

- Robbie King – organ (1, 4, 6, 7)
- Tommy Mandel – keyboards (2), organ (5, 9, 10)
- Dave "Pick" Pickell – piano (3, 6, 7)
- Ian Stanley – keyboards (3, 5, 8)
- Jim Vallance – percussion, piano (1, 4, 10), sequencing (2, 8), keyboards (3), gang vocals (8)

Production

- Bryan Adams – producer
- Bob Clearmountain – producer, recording, mixing
- Jim Vallance – associate producer
- Tim Crich – recording
- Richard Moakes – second engineer
- Ron Obvious – technical engineer
- Bob Ludwig – mastering
- Masterdisk (New York, NY) – mastering location
- Jeff Gold – art direction
- John Warwicker – art direction
- Platform – design
- Anton Corbijn – photography
- Hans Sipma – photography

== Charts ==
=== Weekly charts ===
Weekly chart positions for Into the Fire
Chart (1987–88)	Peak position
Australian Albums (Kent Music Report)	14
Austrian Albums (Ö3 Austria)	13
Canadian Albums (RMP	2
European Albums (Music & Media)	8
Finnish Albums (Suomen virallinen lista)	3
German Albums (Offizielle Top 100)	7
Dutch Albums (Album Top 100)	18
Norwegian Albums (VG-lista)	4
Swedish Albums (Sverigetopplistan)	3
Swiss Albums (Schweizer Hitparade)	4
UK Albums (Official Charts)	10
US Billboard 200	7

== Certifications ==
Region	Certification	Certified units/sales
Canada (Music Canada)	3× Platinum	300,000^{^}
Switzerland (IFPI Switzerland)	Platinum	50,000^{^}
United Kingdom (BPI)	Gold	100,000^{^}
United States (RIAA)	Platinum	1,000,000^{^}
^{^} Shipments figures based on certification alone.
