= Hearts on Fire (Bryan Adams song) =

Single by Bryan Adams

from the album Into the Fire
- B-side: "The Best Was Yet to Come"
- Released: May 1987
- Recorded: 1986
- Genre: Rock
- Length: 3:30
- Label: A&M
- Songwriters: Bryan Adams and Jim Vallance
- Producers: Bob Clearmountain, Bryan Adams and Jim Vallance

Bryan Adams singles chronology
"Heat of the Night" (1987)	"Hearts on Fire" (1987)	"Victim of Love" (1987)

"Hearts on Fire" is a song performed by Bryan Adams on his 1987 album Into the Fire. Written by Adams and Jim Vallance in Vancouver, British Columbia, Canada in 1984, it was not completed until 1986 or early 1987 when Adams went to record in September 1986 at Cliffhanger Studios, West Vancouver (Adams's home studio at the time). The song was mixed by co-producer Bob Clearmountain in January 1987 at AIR Studios in London.

== Background ==
The song was partially written at the time Adams and Vallance were writing for the album Reckless and not completed until the album recording started. Vallance comments on his website that he believes the sounds were more suited to Reckless than Into the Fire. Adams however believes the song was perfect for the album as it made a direct connection between the two albums for those that liked the previous work. Spreading the connection ever further to his subsequent album, Waking Up the Neighbours Adams re-used the opening riff to the song for the track "House Arrest".

== Live performance ==
Adams often plays this song at his live concerts with prolonged guitar solo battles with his guitarist Keith Scott.

== Personnel ==
Personnel taken from Into the Fire liner notes.

- Bryan Adams - vocals, rhythm guitar
- Keith Scott - lead and rhythm guitar
- Dave Taylor - bass
- Mickey Curry - drums

Additional musicians

- Tommy Mandel - organ
- Jim Vallance - percussion

== Chart performance ==
Chart (1987)	Peak position
Australia (Kent Music Report)	89
Canada (RPM)	25
United Kingdom (The Official Charts Company)	57
US Billboard Hot 100	26
US Billboard Album Rock Tracks	3
