= Thought I'd Died and Gone to Heaven =

1992 single by Bryan Adams

Single by Bryan Adams

from the album Waking Up the Neighbours
- B-side: "Summer of '69" (live); "Somebody" (live)
- Released: February 10, 1992
- Studio: Battery (London); The Warehouse (Vancouver, British Columbia)
- Length: 5:49
- Label: A&M
- Songwriters: Bryan Adams; Robert Lange
- Producers: Robert Lange; Bryan Adams

Bryan Adams singles chronology
"There Will Never Be Another Tonight" (1991)	"Thought I'd Died and Gone to Heaven" (1992)	"All I Want Is You" (1992)

"Thought I'd Died and Gone to Heaven" is a song by Canadian singer and songwriter Bryan Adams, released in February 1992 by A&M Records as the fourth single from his sixth studio album, Waking up the Neighbours (1991). Penned by Robert Lange and Bryan Adams, the song became Adams' third chart-topper in his native Canada, reached No. 13 on the US Billboard Hot 100, and peaked at No. 8 in the United Kingdom.

== Critical reception ==
Larry Flick, Billboard magazine's reviewer, positively reviewed the song, reporting that the "anthemic chorus sounds like it was penned to be chanted in arenas".

== Music video ==
The music video for "Thought I'd Died and Gone to Heaven" is shot in a barley field in the middle of the night with dolphins flying over Bryan Adams and his band.

== Track listings ==
- Canadian and US cassette single; Japanese mini-CD single
1. "Thought I'd Died and Gone to Heaven"
2. "Summer of '69" (live)
- UK 7-inch and cassette single
1. "Thought I'd Died and Gone to Heaven"
2. "Somebody" (live)
- UK 12-inch single

A1. "Thought I'd Died and Gone to Heaven"
A2. "Somebody" (live)
B1. "(Everything I Do) I Do It for You" (single version)

- UK and Australian CD single, Australian cassette single
1. "Thought I'd Died and Gone to Heaven"
2. "Somebody" (live)
3. "Heat of the Night" (live)

== Charts ==
=== Weekly charts ===
Chart (1992–1993)	Peak position
Australia (ARIA)	13
Belgium (Ultratop 50 Flanders)	29
Canada Top Singles (RPM)	1
Europe (Eurochart Hot 100)	30
France (SNEP)	27
Germany (GfK)	47
Ireland (IRMA)	11
Netherlands (Dutch Top 40 Tipparade)	2
Netherlands (Single Top 100)	43
New Zealand (Recorded Music NZ)	23
UK Singles (Official Charts)	8
UK Airplay (Music Week)	4
US Billboard Hot 100	13
US Adult Contemporary (Billboard)	36
US Mainstream Rock Airplay (Billboard)	14
US Cash Box Top 100	7

=== Year-end charts ===
Chart (1992)	Position
Australia (ARIA)	71
Canada Top Singles (RPM)	18
UK Airplay (Music Week)	67
US Billboard Hot 100	74

== Release history ==
Region	Date	Format(s)	Label(s)	Ref.
United Kingdom	February 10, 1992	7-inch vinyl; 12-inch vinyl; CD; cassette	A&M	
Australia	February 1992	CD; cassette	A&M	
Japan	April 17, 1992	Mini-CD	A&M	
