= Waking Up the Neighbours =

1991 studio album by Bryan Adams

Studio album by Bryan Adams
- Released: September 24, 1991
- Recorded: March 1990 – July 1991
- Studios: Battery, London; The Warehouse, Vancouver
- Genre: Rock
- Length: 74:52
- Label: A&M
- Producers: Bryan Adams; Robert John "Mutt" Lange

Bryan Adams chronology
| Live! Live! Live! (1988) | Waking Up the Neighbours (1991) | So Far So Good (1993) |

Singles from Waking Up the Neighbours
- 1. "(Everything I Do) I Do It for You" Released: June 17, 1991; 2. "Can't Stop This Thing We Started" Released: September 2, 1991; 3. "There Will Never Be Another Tonight" Released: November 11, 1991; 4. "Thought I'd Died and Gone to Heaven" Released: February 10, 1992; 5. "All I Want Is You" Released: July 6, 1992 (UK); 6. "Do I Have to Say the Words?" Released: July 1992

Waking Up the Neighbours is the sixth studio album by Canadian singer-songwriter Bryan Adams, released on September 24, 1991. The album was recorded at Battery Studios in London and The Warehouse Studio in Vancouver, mixed at Mayfair Studios in London, and mastered by Bob Ludwig at Masterdisk in New York City.

The album received critical acclaim and reached number one on the album charts in at least eight countries, becoming Adams's second best-selling album worldwide. Its lead single, "(Everything I Do) I Do It for You", spent a record 16 consecutive weeks at number one on the UK Singles Chart. The album was also notable in Canada for generating controversy regarding the system of Canadian content.

At almost 75 minutes, this is Bryan Adams's longest studio album to date.

== Music ==
=== Background and recording ===
The commercial performance of Adams's 1987 album Into the Fire was considered somewhat disappointing. Although it reached No. 7 on the Billboard 200 albums chart and No. 2 in his native Canada, it fell short of the massive commercial success enjoyed by his fourth album, Reckless, released in 1984. Into the Fire was also Adams's last album recorded with his longtime collaborator Jim Vallance; their songwriting partnership dissolved during the making of Waking Up The Neighbours.

Between 1988 and 1989, Adams wrote around 30 songs with Vallance for a follow-up to Into The Fire. Initial attempts were made to record a new album—first in July 1988 with Steve Lillywhite producing and again in May 1989 with regular producer Bob Clearmountain—but nothing from these sessions was released. After a year of meticulously writing and rewriting songs, Adams concluded that he was dissatisfied with the material and wanted to start over. Simultaneously, his creative partnership with Vallance had deteriorated, and Vallance quit in August 1989.

In mid-1989, prior to Vallance's departure, Adams joined forces with producer Robert John "Mutt" Lange, previously known for his work with AC/DC, The Cars, Foreigner, and Def Leppard. Lange assisted with writing and preproduction, developing new songs and reworking some of the earlier ideas conceived with Vallance. It was not until early 1990 that Adams and Lange decided to produce the album themselves, after further sessions with producers Clearmountain and Bob Rock were attempted and shelved.

Recording for the album took place primarily at Lange's private studio in Surrey, England, with additional sessions at Battery Studios (London), The Warehouse (Vancouver), and Mayfair Studios (London); the latter was used for final overdubs and mixing with Clearmountain. Recording began in March 1990, and along with mixing, concluded in July 1991. According to Adams, Lange changed his approach to songwriting by having him work meticulously on each track. As a result, the recording process lasted more than a year, and the release of the album, originally scheduled for the fall of 1990, was postponed several times. Lange is credited on all 15 tracks of the album, including four songs whose demos were originally recorded with Vallance.

== Release and promotion ==
Professional ratings
Review scores
| Source | Rating |
|---|---|
| AllMusic | 3/5 stars |
| Calgary Herald | C |
| Chicago Tribune | 2.5/4 stars |
| Christgau's Consumer Guide | (dud) |
| Entertainment Weekly | B− |
| Los Angeles Times | 3/4 stars |
| Metal Hammer | 3/5 stars |
| MusicHound Rock | 3/5 stars |
| NME | 4/10 |
| Rolling Stone | 4/5 stars |

Waking Up the Neighbours was released after several delays in September 1991. The album peaked at number six on the Billboard 200. The album and its lead single topped the charts in several countries, with "(Everything I Do) I Do It for You" spending a record 16 weeks at number one on the UK Singles Chart and topping the charts in 17 countries. It sold four million copies in the US. Canadian content regulations were revised in 1991 to allow radio stations to credit airplay of the album toward their legal requirement to broadcast Canadian music. The album is Adams's second-bestselling album worldwide.

=== Singles ===
Released prior to the album, "(Everything I Do) I Do It for You" was its most successful single. It has become one of the best-selling singles of all time, spending seven weeks at number one on the United States' Billboard Hot 100, sixteen consecutive weeks at number one on the UK Singles Chart, 11 weeks on the Dutch Top 40, and nine weeks at number one on the Canadian singles chart in Canada. The song received a Grammy Award for Best Song Written Specifically for a Motion Picture or Television at the 1992 Grammy Awards and was nominated for an Academy Award for Best Song of 1991.

Adams was approached to write a theme song by the producers of the Kevin Costner film Robin Hood: Prince of Thieves and received a tape of orchestration written by film score composer Michael Kamen. Adams and "Mutt" Lange used a section of Kamen's orchestration to compose "(Everything I Do) I Do It for You", which was placed deep in the film's closing credits when the film opened on June 14, 1991. The song reached number one in the United Kingdom the week before the film's British release, topped the charts in 16 countries, and sold more than 10 million copies worldwide, becoming one of the best-selling singles in music history. When the BBC asked Adams about the acoustic live version from his Bare Bones CD, "Do you ever get bored of hearing your record-breaking hit 'Everything I Do'?" he said: "Of course not. What a silly question." Julien Temple directed the music video for "(Everything I Do) I Do It for You", which was filmed in Sheffield, England, on May 17–18, 1991.

"Can't Stop This Thing We Started" was the album's second single. A rock song (in contrast to "(Everything I Do) I Do It for You"), it peaked at number two on the Billboard Hot 100 behind Prince's "Cream". The song was nominated at the 1992 Grammy Awards for Best Rock Song and Best Rock Performance, Solo.

"There Will Never Be Another Tonight" was the third single; its title came from a fragment Adams and Jim Vallance wrote in the late 1980s. Originally titled "Buddy Holly Idea" because of its resemblance to Holly's "Peggy Sue", it was developed into a song by Lange and Adams.

"Thought I'd Died and Gone to Heaven" was the fourth single from Waking up the Neighbours. It reached number 13 on the Billboard Hot 100 and number 14 on the Mainstream Rock Tracks chart. In the UK, the song reached number eight. "All I Want Is You", "Do I Have to Say the Words?" (number 11 on the Billboard Hot 100), and "Touch the Hand" were also released as singles, but received less airplay than the first four singles.

== Canadian content controversy ==
The album caused controversy in Canada concerning the system of Canadian Content. Although Adams was one of Canada's biggest recording stars at the time, the specific nature of his collaboration with non-Canadians, coupled with his decision to primarily record the album outside Canada, meant that the album and its tracks did not qualify as Canadian content for the purposes of Canadian radio airplay. Under the system then in effect, a piece of recorded music had to meet any two of the following four criteria in order to qualify as Canadian content:

- 1) the artist was Canadian
- 2) the track was completely recorded in Canada
- 3) the music was entirely written by a Canadian (or Canadians)
- 4) the lyrics were entirely written by a Canadian (or Canadians)

Because Adams co-wrote both the music and the lyrics with Mutt Lange, who is from Zambia, and did not record the album primarily in Canada, he fulfilled only one of the criteria. If Adams had written all the lyrics and Lange all the music (or vice versa), the collaboration would have qualified as Canadian content. Consequently, under CRTC regulations, none of the album's songs qualified as Canadian content.

In protest, Adams briefly threatened to boycott Canada's annual Juno Awards, where his album had been almost completely passed over by the awards committee. He ultimately won the Entertainer of the Year Award (voted on by the public) and the Producer of the Year Award.

Adams publicly criticized CRTC policy, calling it "a disgrace, a shame...stupidity". He continued his attack with:

"You'd never hear Elton John being declared un-British [...] It's time to abolish the CRTC. Not everyone agrees."

Following the controversy, the Canadian Radio-television and Telecommunications Commission announced in September of that year that Canadian content rules would be amended. The revised regulation allows non-Canadians to contribute up to 50% of the finished content to both the music and the lyrics of a recorded piece while still qualifying for Canadian content status—provided the recording artist is Canadian or the song is recorded in Canada. Accordingly, the Adams/Lange songs and the Adams/Lange/Vallance songs on the album now qualify as Canadian content, as Jim Vallance is also Canadian. However, the Adams/Lange/Kamen co-written track "(Everything I Do) I Do It for You" still does not qualify as Canadian content, because two of the three writers are non-Canadians and the song was not recorded in Canada.

== Waking Up the Nation tour ==
Before releasing the album, Adams had already begun a promotional tour, and on June 8, 1991, he co-headlined large concerts in Europe with ZZ Top. Shortly after the tour began, "(Everything I Do) I Do It for You" was released as the lead single for the album. The single became an international hit. Adams further supported the album with his Waking Up the World tour, which began in October 1991 and ran through the end of December 1993. On October 4, 1991, the world tour opened in Belfast, Northern Ireland. On December 18, 1991, Adams played his first two shows in Reykjavík, Iceland. After the European leg, which included a concert at Wembley Stadium attended by more than 72,000 people, Adams traveled to the United States, where he performed at the Ritz Theatre on January 10. That concert sold out in less than 20 minutes. In attendance were Ben E. King and Nona Hendryx.

The Canadian leg of the Waking Up the World Tour kicked off in Sydney, Nova Scotia, on January 12, 1992, and wrapped up with a standing-room-only concert in Vancouver, British Columbia, on January 31. In February 1992, he toured New Zealand and Australia for seven dates, beginning with a press conference in Sydney. On February 21, the tour headed to Japan for nearly a dozen shows in six cities. Adams taped an interview with MuchMusic's Terry Dave Mulligan in Calgary, Alberta, with the airdate scheduled for mid-March. The tour continued through several European countries in June 1992, including Italy, Germany, the Netherlands, and Scandinavia; in July 1992, Adams performed for the first time in Hungary and Turkey. From September through December 1992, the tour visited the US. The Asian leg visited Thailand, Singapore, Japan, and Hong Kong in February 1993, before returning to the US from March through May.

Adams's visit to South Africa during the Waking Up the World tour—following the release of Nelson Mandela and other political prisoners and the lifting of bans on Black political parties—remains relatively undocumented. Adams's concert at Cape Town's Green Point Stadium during the tour was described as one of his most emotional and memorable performances.

Coca-Cola was an official partner and sponsor of the tour, releasing a commercial to promote it. The commercial featured the song "House Arrest", showing Adams and his band performing in a neighborhood, and co-starred actress Neve Campbell.

== Track listing ==
All tracks written and produced by Bryan Adams and Robert John "Mutt" Lange, except where noted.

Standard edition
| No. | Title | Writer(s) | Length |
|---|---|---|---|
| 1. | "Is Your Mama Gonna Miss Ya?" | | 4:41 |
| 2. | "Hey Honey – I'm Packin' You In!" | Adams; Lange; Victoria Russell; Keith Scott | 3:59 |
| 3. | "Can't Stop This Thing We Started" | | 4:29 |
| 4. | "Thought I'd Died and Gone to Heaven" | | 5:48 |
| 5. | "Not Guilty" | | 4:12 |
| 6. | "Vanishing" | | 5:03 |
| 7. | "House Arrest" | Adams; Lange; Jim Vallance | 3:58 |
| 8. | "Do I Have to Say the Words?" | Adams; Lange; Vallance | 6:11 |
| 9. | "There Will Never Be Another Tonight" | Adams; Lange; Vallance | 4:40 |
| 10. | "All I Want Is You" | | 5:20 |
| 11. | "Depend on Me" | Adams; Lange; Vallance | 5:07 |
| 12. | "(Everything I Do) I Do It for You" | Adams; Lange; Michael Kamen | 6:34 |
| 13. | "If You Wanna Leave Me (Can I Come Too?)" | | 4:43 |
| 14. | "Touch the Hand" | | 4:05 |
| 15. | "Don't Drop That Bomb on Me" | | 6:00 |
| Total length: | | | 74:52 |

2012 Japan SHM-CD bonus track
| No. | Title | Writer(s) | Length |
|---|---|---|---|
| 16. | "(Everything I Do) I Do It for You" (Spanish version) | Adams; Lange; Kamen; Martin Kierszenbaum | 4:07 |
| Total length: | | | 78:58 |

== Personnel ==
Dukes of Leisure

- Bryan Adams – vocals, rhythm guitars
- Keith Scott – lead guitars, backing vocals
- Mickey Curry – drums
- Dave Taylor – bass
- Tommy Mandel – Hammond organ

Honorary Dukes of Leisure

- Phil Nicholas – keyboards, programming
- Robbie King – Hammond organ
- Bill Payne – piano, Hammond organ
- Larry Klein – bass
- Ed Shearmur – keyboards
- The Tuck Back Twins (Bryan Adams and Robert John "Mutt" Lange) – backing vocals

Production

- Bryan Adams – producer
- Robert John "Mutt" Lange – producer
- Nigel Green – recording
- Ken Lomas – additional recording
- Yan Memmi – assistant engineer
- Ron Obvious – technical engineer
- Bob Clearmountain – mixing
- Avril Mackintosh – mix assistant
- Bob Ludwig – mastering
- Richard Frankel – package design
- Andrew Catlin – design concept, photography

== Charts ==
=== Weekly charts ===
| Chart (1991–92) | Peak position |
|---|---|
| Australian Albums (ARIA) | 1 |
| Austrian Albums (Ö3 Austria) | 1 |
| Canadian Albums (Music Canada) | 1 |
| Dutch Albums (Album Top 100) | 2 |
| European Albums (Music & Media) | 1 |
| French Albums (SNEP) | 12 |
| Finnish Albums (Suomen virallinen lista) | 1 |
| German Albums (Offizielle Top 100) | 1 |
| Hungarian Albums (MAHASZ) | 18 |
| New Zealand Albums (RMNZ) | 28 |
| Norwegian Albums (VG-lista) | 1 |
| Portuguese Albums (AFP) | 1 |
| Spanish Albums (AFYVE) | 5 |
| Swedish Albums (Sverigetopplistan) | 1 |
| Swiss Albums (Schweizer Hitparade) | 1 |
| UK Albums (Official Charts) | 1 |
| US Billboard 200 | 6 |

=== Year-end charts ===
| Chart (1991) | Position |
|---|---|
| Australian Albums Chart | 23 |
| Austrian Albums Chart | 25 |
| Canadian Albums Chart | 15 |
| Dutch Albums Chart | 13 |
| French Albums Chart | 34 |
| German Albums Chart | 27 |
| New Zealand Albums Chart | 32 |
| US Cash Box Albums | 43 |

| Chart (1992) | Position |
|---|---|
| Argentina Foreign Albums (CAPIF) | 15 |
| Australian Albums Chart | 41 |
| Canadian Albums Chart | 61 |
| Dutch Albums Chart | 13 |
| German Albums Chart | 19 |
| New Zealand Albums Chart | 11 |
| Swiss Albums Chart | 17 |
| US Billboard 200 | 23 |
| US Cash Box Albums | 41 |

== Certifications and sales ==
| Region | Certification | Certified units/sales |
|---|---|---|
| Australia (ARIA) | 4× Platinum | 280,000^{^} |
| Austria (IFPI Austria) | Platinum | 50,000^{*} |
| Belgium (BRMA) | Platinum | 50,000^{*} |
| Canada (Music Canada) | Diamond | 1,200,000 |
| Denmark (IFPI Danmark) | Gold | 10,000^{‡} |
| Finland (Musiikkituottajat) | Platinum | 82,230 |
| France (SNEP) | Gold | 100,000^{*} |
| Germany (BVMI) | Platinum | 500,000^{^} |
| Japan (RIAJ) | Gold | 100,000^{^} |
| Mexico | — | 120,000 |
| Netherlands (NVPI) | Platinum | 100,000^{^} |
| New Zealand (RMNZ) | Platinum | 15,000^{^} |
| Portugal (AFP) | 6× Platinum | 240,000^{^} |
| Singapore | — | 60,000 |
| Spain (Promusicae) | Platinum | 120,000 |
| Sweden (GLF) | 2× Platinum | 200,000^{^} |
| Switzerland (IFPI Switzerland) | 4× Platinum | 200,000^{^} |
| United Kingdom (BPI) | 3× Platinum | 900,000^{^} |
| United States (RIAA) | 4× Platinum | 4,000,000^{^} |
Summaries
| Europe (IFPI) | 3× Platinum | 3,000,000^{*} |
| Worldwide | — | 16,000,000 |
^{*} Sales figures based on certification alone.^{^} Shipments figures based on certification alone.^{‡} Sales+streaming figures based on certification alone.

== See also ==
- List of diamond-certified albums in Canada
