= Have You Ever Really Loved a Woman? =

1995 single by Bryan Adams

Single by Bryan Adams

from the album Don Juan DeMarco: Original Motion Picture Soundtrack
- B-side: "Low Life"
- Released: April 4, 1995
- Genre: Latin rock
- Length: 4:50
- Label: A&M
- Songwriters: Bryan Adams; Michael Kamen; Robert John "Mutt" Lange
- Producers: Bryan Adams; Robert John "Mutt" Lange

Bryan Adams singles chronology
| "All for Love" (1993) | "Have You Ever Really Loved a Woman?" (1995) | "Rock Steady" (1995) |

Audio sample
- "Have You Ever Really Loved a Woman?": file; help

"Have You Ever Really Loved a Woman?" is a song written by Canadian musician Bryan Adams, Michael Kamen and Robert John "Mutt" Lange, and recorded by Adams for the 1995 film Don Juan DeMarco, starring Marlon Brando, Johnny Depp and Faye Dunaway. The melody is used as a musical motif through the film, and the song is featured three times in the movie, twice performed by other artists in Spanish, and finally performed by Adams himself during the closing credits. The Adams version of the song, which features flamenco guitarist Paco de Lucía, is included on the soundtrack album and on Adams' seventh studio album, 18 til I Die, which was released over a year later.

The song stayed at number one for five weeks on the Billboard Hot 100 in the United States, making it the third number-one song for the songwriting team. It also went to number one in Canada, Australia, Austria, and Switzerland while reaching the top five in 10 additional countries, including France and the United Kingdom, and the top ten in a further four countries. Its accompanying music video was filmed in Málaga, Spain. The song was nominated for Best Original Song at the 68th Academy Awards but lost to "Colors of the Wind" from the Disney animated film Pocahontas.

== Critical reception ==
Paul Verna from Billboard magazine described the song as "sultry". Steve Baltin from Cash Box noted that here, "the king of soundtrack ballads attempts to reclaim his throne". He added further, "The flamenco introduction lends the false hope this may be something different, but it's the same old Adams. Be careful not to operate any heavy machinery while under the influence of this one." Fell and Rufer from the Gavin Report viewed it as an "unusual waltz with #1 written all over it." Pan-European magazine Music & Media commented, "Everything is there to make it work: a film, Don Juan DeMarco, a ballad, a long song title but nothing between brackets, guitarist Paco de Lucía and Adams' hoarse voice."

Christine Coulter, librarian/programmer at Downtown Radio/Belfast stated, "It's absolutely different from his previous film ballads. The film, which will be issued here in May I believe, is not the reason we play it. For us it's a track that stands fully on its own." A reviewer from Music Week gave it three out of five, writing that "Bryan comes over all Hispanic for this strong ballad which arrives replete with Spanish guitar flourishes and castanets." The magazine's Alan Jones described it as "a simple, singalong song in waltztime, with acoustic Spanish style guitar picking." Barbara Ellen from NME felt it finds Adams "at his most plaintive".

== Music video ==
A screenshot of the music video. As of 2026, the music video is not available to watch on YouTube or any official platform.

The music video for "Have You Ever Really Loved a Woman?" was shot in Málaga, Spain at Casa los Pavos Reales, starring Cecilie Thomsen and Amira Casar. It was directed by the music video director Anton Corbijn and was released in May 1995.

It was posted on Adams' official YouTube channel on October 31, 2008. The original video had the identifier "hq2KgzKETBw", and it had 107 million views and 409.6 thousand likes. For unknown reasons, the original music video was taken private, and as of March 2026, is unavailable on YouTube or any official platform.

== Rerecording ==
In 2022, Adams released a rerecording of the song with the label "Classic Version". The video was shot in Vigo, Spain, in July 2022.

== Personnel ==
Personnel are taken from the 18 Til I Die liner notes.

- Bryan Adams – vocals, acoustic guitar, handclaps
- Paco de Lucía – Spanish guitar
- Mutt Lange – bass
- Mickey Curry – drums, brushes
- Olle Romo – castanets, pads

== Charts ==
=== Weekly charts ===
1995 weekly chart performance for "Have You Ever Really Loved a Woman?"
| Chart (1995) | Peak position |
|---|---|
| Australia (ARIA) | 1 |
| Austria (Ö3 Austria Top 40) | 1 |
| Belgium (Ultratop 50 Flanders) | 3 |
| Belgium (Ultratop 50 Wallonia) | 2 |
| Brazil (UPI) | 2 |
| Canada Retail Singles (The Record) | 1 |
| Canada Top Singles (RPM) | 1 |
| Canada Adult Contemporary (RPM) | 1 |
| Denmark (IFPI) | 3 |
| Europe (Eurochart Hot 100) | 1 |
| Europe (European Hit Radio) | 1 |
| Finland (Suomen virallinen lista) | 7 |
| France (SNEP) | 5 |
| Germany (GfK) | 3 |
| Hungary (Mahasz) | 2 |
| Iceland (Íslenski Listinn Topp 40) | 2 |
| Ireland (IRMA) | 3 |
| Israel (Israeli Singles Chart) | 22 |
| Italy (Musica e dischi) | 8 |
| Italy Airplay (Music & Media) | 3 |
| Netherlands (Dutch Top 40) | 2 |
| Netherlands (Single Top 100) | 2 |
| New Zealand (Recorded Music NZ) | 9 |
| Norway (VG-lista) | 5 |
| Poland Airplay (Music & Media) | 2 |
| Scottish Singles Sales (Official Charts) | 4 |
| Sweden (Sverigetopplistan) | 6 |
| Switzerland (Schweizer Hitparade) | 1 |
| UK Singles (Official Charts) | 4 |
| US Billboard Hot 100 | 1 |
| US Adult Contemporary (Billboard) | 1 |
| US Adult Pop Airplay (Billboard) | 21 |
| US Pop Airplay (Billboard) | 5 |
| US Rhythmic Airplay (Billboard) | 29 |
| US Cash Box Top 100 | 1 |

2026 weekly chart performance for "Have You Ever Really Loved a Woman?"
| Chart (2026) | Peak position |
|---|---|
| Jamaica Airplay (JAMMS) | 7 |

=== Year-end charts ===
Year-end chart performance for "Have You Ever Really Loved a Woman?"
| Chart (1995) | Position |
|---|---|
| Australia (ARIA) | 6 |
| Austria (Ö3 Austria Top 40) | 6 |
| Belgium (Ultratop 50 Flanders) | 9 |
| Belgium (Ultratop 50 Wallonia) | 8 |
| Brazil (Crowley) | 4 |
| Canada Top Singles (RPM) | 5 |
| Canada Adult Contemporary (RPM) | 1 |
| Europe (Eurochart Hot 100) | 4 |
| Europe (European Hit Radio) | 1 |
| France (SNEP) | 13 |
| Germany (Media Control) | 6 |
| Iceland (Íslenski Listinn Topp 40) | 17 |
| Netherlands (Dutch Top 40) | 7 |
| Netherlands (Single Top 100) | 17 |
| New Zealand (RIANZ) | 27 |
| Sweden (Topplistan) | 14 |
| Switzerland (Schweizer Hitparade) | 1 |
| UK Singles (OCC) | 70 |
| UK Airplay (Music Week) | 37 |
| US Billboard Hot 100 | 16 |
| US Adult Contemporary (Billboard) | 6 |
| US Top 40/Mainstream (Billboard) | 29 |
| US Cash Box Top 100 | 15 |

=== Decade-end charts ===
Decade-end chart performance for "Have You Ever Really Loved a Woman?"
| Chart (1990–1999) | Position |
|---|---|
| Austria (Ö3 Austria Top 40) | 16 |
| Canada (Nielsen SoundScan) | 10 |
| Netherlands (Dutch Top 40) | 99 |
| US Billboard Hot 100 | 54 |

== Certifications ==
Certifications and sales for "Have You Ever Really Loved a Woman?"
| Region | Certification | Certified units/sales |
|---|---|---|
| Australia (ARIA) | Platinum | 70,000^{^} |
| Austria (IFPI Austria) | Gold | 25,000^{*} |
| Belgium (BRMA) | Gold | 25,000^{*} |
| Germany (BVMI) | Gold | 250,000^{^} |
| New Zealand (RMNZ) | Gold | 15,000^{‡} |
| Sweden (GLF) | Gold | 25,000^{^} |
| Switzerland (IFPI Switzerland) | Gold | 25,000^{^} |
| United Kingdom (BPI) | Silver | 200,000^{^} |
| United States | — | 600,000 |
^{*} Sales figures based on certification alone.^{^} Shipments figures based on certification alone.^{‡} Sales+streaming figures based on certification alone.

== Release history ==
Release dates and formats for "Have You Ever Really Loved a Woman?"
| Region | Date | Format(s) | Label(s) | Ref. |
|---|---|---|---|---|
| United States | April 4, 1995 | 7-inch vinyl; CD; cassette | A&M | |
| United Kingdom | April 10, 1995 | 7-inch vinyl; CD; cassette | A&M | |
| Japan | May 10, 1995 | CD | A&M | |
| Australia | May 15, 1995 | CD; cassette | A&M; Polydor | |
