= Can't Stop This Thing We Started =

1991 single by Bryan Adams

Single by Bryan Adams

from the album Waking Up the Neighbours
- B-side: "(Everything I Do) I Do It for You"; "It's Only Love" (live)
- Released: September 2, 1991
- Genre: Rock
- Length: 4:29
- Label: A&M
- Songwriters: Bryan Adams; Robert Lange
- Producers: Robert Lange; Bryan Adams

Bryan Adams singles chronology
"(Everything I Do) I Do It for You" (1991)	"Can't Stop This Thing We Started" (1991)	"There Will Never Be Another Tonight" (1991)

"Can't Stop This Thing We Started" is a song by Canadian singer-songwriter Bryan Adams. The song was written by Adams and Robert John "Mutt" Lange, and was released in September 1991 by A&M Records as the second single from Adams' sixth studio album, Waking Up the Neighbours (1991). The song peaked at number two on the US Billboard Hot 100 while topping the Canadian RPM 100 Hit Tracks chart for three non-consecutive weeks. The track received two nominations at the Grammy Awards of 1992 for Best Rock Song and Best Rock Performance, Solo, winning neither. It served as the 2009 British Columbia Liberal Party campaign theme song.

== Track listings ==
- Single-CD: A&M Records / 390812-2 Europe

Music By, Lyrics By – Bryan Adams, Robert John Lange

1. "Can't Stop This Thing We Started" – 4:35
2. "It's Only Love (Live)" – 3:36
3. "Hearts On Fire (Live)" – 4:20 1
- Single-CD: A&M Records / PCDY-10030 Japan

Music By, Lyrics By – Bryan Adams, Robert John Lange

1. "Can't Stop This Thing We Started" – 4:35
2. "(Everything I Do) I Do It For You" – 5:36 2
- Single-CD: A&M Records / 75021 7276 2 USA

Music By, Lyrics By – Bryan Adams, Robert John Lange

1. "Can't Stop This Thing We Started (LP Version)" – 4:29
2. "Can't Stop This Thing We Started (Single Radio Version)" – 4:11 3

== Charts ==
=== Weekly charts ===
Chart (1991–1992)	Peak position
Australia (ARIA)	9
Austria (Ö3 Austria Top 40)	14
Belgium (Ultratop 50 Flanders)	4
Canada Top Singles (RPM)	1
Canada Adult Contemporary (RPM)	13
Denmark (IFPI)	2
Europe (Eurochart Hot 100)	9
Europe (European Hit Radio)	7
Finland (Suomen virallinen lista)	10
France (SNEP)	10
Germany (GfK)	14
Ireland (IRMA)	4
Luxembourg (Radio Luxembourg)	3
Netherlands (Dutch Top 40)	5
Netherlands (Single Top 100)	10
New Zealand (Recorded Music NZ)	7
Norway (VG-lista)	7
Portugal (AFP)	8
Sweden (Sverigetopplistan)	3
Switzerland (Schweizer Hitparade)	8
UK Singles (Official Charts)	12
UK Airplay (Music Week)	3
US Billboard Hot 100	2
US Adult Contemporary (Billboard)	40
US Mainstream Rock Airplay (Billboard)	2
US Cash Box Top 100	1
Zimbabwe (ZIMA)	4

=== Year-end charts ===
Chart (1991)	Position
Australia (ARIA)	85
Belgium (Ultratop)	40
Canada Top Singles (RPM)	3
Europe (Eurochart Hot 100)	84
Europe (European Hit Radio)	64
Netherlands (Dutch Top 40)	62
Netherlands (Single Top 100)	66
Sweden (Topplistan)	28
US Billboard Hot 100	59
US Album Rock Tracks (Billboard)	38
US Cash Box Top 100	25

Chart (1992)	Position
US Cash Box Top 100	50

== Certifications ==
Region	Certification	Certified units/sales
Canada (Music Canada)	Gold	50,000^{^}
United States (RIAA)	Gold	500,000^{^}
^{^} Shipments figures based on certification alone.

== Release history ==
Region	Date	Format(s)	Label(s)	Ref.
United Kingdom	September 2, 1991	7-inch vinyl; 12-inch vinyl; CD; cassette	A&M	
Australia	September 16, 1991	CD; cassette	A&M	
Japan	October 16, 1991	Mini-CD	A&M	
