= (Everything I Do) I Do It for You =

1991 single by Bryan Adams

Single by Bryan Adams

from the album Robin Hood: Prince of Thieves (Original Soundtrack) and Waking Up the Neighbours
- B-side: "She's Only Happy When She's Dancing" (live); "Cuts Like a Knife" (live)
- Written: 1990
- Released: June 17, 1991
- Recorded: March 1991
- Studio: Battery, London, England
- Genre: Soft rock
- Length: 6:34 (album/video version); 4:06 (single version)
- Label: A&M
- Songwriters: Bryan Adams; Michael Kamen; Robert "Mutt" Lange
- Producer: Robert "Mutt" Lange

Bryan Adams singles chronology
"Only the Strong Survive" (1987)	"(Everything I Do) I Do It for You" (1991)	"Can't Stop This Thing We Started" (1991)

Audio sample
- file; help

Music video
- "(Everything I Do) I Do It for You" on YouTube

"(Everything I Do) I Do It for You" is a song by Canadian singer-songwriter Bryan Adams. Written by Adams, Michael Kamen, and Robert John "Mutt" Lange, the power ballad was the lead single for both the soundtrack album from the 1991 film Robin Hood: Prince of Thieves and Adams' sixth studio album, Waking Up the Neighbours (1991). The single was released on June 17, 1991, by A&M Records and the accompanying music video was directed by Julien Temple.

The song was a chart success internationally, reaching the number-one position on the music charts of at least 19 countries. In the United Kingdom, it spent 16 consecutive weeks at number one on the UK Singles Chart. It went on to sell more than 15 million copies worldwide, making it Adams' most successful song and one of the best-selling singles of all time. The song has been covered by hundreds of singers and artists around the world.

== Background ==
The musicians on the original recording are Adams on lead vocals, backing vocals and rhythm guitar, Bill Payne (piano), Mickey Curry (drums), Larry Klein (bass), Keith Scott (lead guitar and backing vocals), Tommy Mandel (organ), Ed Shearmur and Phil Nicholas (keyboards and programming). The song was based on the film's love theme by Kamen, "Maid Marian".

The song was written in Willesden, London, UK at the studio Adams was working at in 1990, and he and Lange wrote it in 45 minutes, recording it the following March, and releasing it three months later. The song is performed in the key of D♭ major.

== Commercial performance ==
In the United Kingdom, "(Everything I Do) I Do It for You" had the longest unbroken run at number one, spending sixteen consecutive weeks at the top of the UK Singles Chart from July 7, 1991, to October 27 when it dropped to number four, surpassing the record 11 weeks set by Slim Whitman's hit single "Rose Marie" in 1955. Adams' achievement was celebrated by Whitman in November 1991, when he joined Adams on stage at Wembley Arena to sing "Rose Marie", after which he presented Adams with a plaque commemorating the achievement. "(Everything I Do) I Do It for You" also topped the Europe-wide sales chart for eighteen continuous weeks, still an all-time record, and topped the European-wide radio airplay chart for ten weeks.

In the United States, the power ballad spent seven weeks at number one on the Billboard Hot 100, which combines radio airplay and sales, the longest running number one song since 1983, and seventeen consecutive weeks at number one on the sales-only chart, which at the time set the all-time record for consecutive weeks at one. Billboard ranked it as the number-one pop song for 1991. It also held the number one spot on the US Adult Contemporary Chart for eight consecutive weeks, the longest run atop that chart since 1979, and was the number one song of the year on that chart.

"(Everything I Do) I Do It for You" also spent nine weeks atop the singles chart in Adams' native Canada, eleven weeks atop the Australian Singles Chart, and twelve weeks atop the Sweden Singles Chart. In most of the countries where it ascended to number one, it was the number one song for the year 1991, exceptions being Germany (number two), Austria (number two) and Switzerland (number three).

== Music videos ==
The official music video for the song was directed by British film, documentary and music video director Julien Temple. It shows Adams and his band performing the song in a forest with a silk mill in the background, and Adams alone performing on a rocky beachside, intercut with scenes from Robin Hood: Prince of Thieves. The video was filmed in a forest with a derelict silk mill near Holford in the Quantock Hills and on a beach with geological cliff formations near Kilve, Somerset, England. A video was also commissioned for a live version of the song, directed by Andy Morahan.

== Awards and accolades ==
Adams, Kamen, and Lange won a Grammy Award for Best Song Written Specifically for a Motion Picture or Television, and was nominated for the Grammy Award for Record of the Year at the Grammy Awards of 1992. It was also nominated for an Academy Award for Best Original Song, but lost to "Beauty and the Beast" from the Disney film of the same name. As recently as July 2020, it placed at number 13 on YouTube's "Most Listened to Rock Countdown", a monthly tally of the most viewed and listened to songs of the rock genre, both in current release and from the past; this was the second highest-ranked song by Adams after "Please Forgive Me" at number 10. The song was placed 18th in a survey of the favourite songs of British readers of the Guinness Book of Records.

== Personnel ==
- Bryan Adams – lead and backing vocals, rhythm guitar
- Keith Scott – lead guitar, backing vocals
- Mickey Curry – drums
- Bill Payne – piano
- Larry Klein – bass
- Tommy Mandel – Hammond organ
- Ed Shearmur – keyboards
- Phil Nicholas – keyboards, programming
- Robert John "Mutt" Lange – producer
- Bob Clearmountain – mixing
- Nigel Green – engineer

== Charts ==
=== Weekly charts ===
Chart (1991–1993)	Peak position
Australia (ARIA)	1
Austria (Ö3 Austria Top 40)	1
Belgium (Ultratop 50 Flanders)	1
Canada Retail Singles (The Record)	1
Canada Top Singles (RPM)	1
Canada Adult Contemporary (RPM)	1
Denmark (IFPI)	1
El Salvador (UPI)	7
Europe (Eurochart Hot 100)	1
Europe (European Hit Radio)	1
Finland (Suomen virallinen lista)	1
France (SNEP)	1
Germany (GfK)	1
Greece (IFPI)	1
Ireland (IRMA)	1
Israel (Israeli Singles Chart)	1
Italy (Musica e dischi)	3
Luxembourg (Radio Luxembourg)	1
Netherlands (Dutch Top 40)	1
Netherlands (Single Top 100)	1
New Zealand (Recorded Music NZ)	1
Norway (VG-lista)	1
Panama (UPI)	6
Portugal (AFP)	1
Spain (AFYVE)	4
Sweden (Sverigetopplistan)	1
Switzerland (Schweizer Hitparade)	1
UK Singles (Official Charts)	1
UK Airplay (Music Week)	1
US Billboard Hot 100	1
US Adult Contemporary (Billboard)	1
US Mainstream Rock Airplay (Billboard)	10
US Cash Box Top 100	1
Zimbabwe (ZIMA)	2

Chart (2021)	Peak position
US Digital Song Sales (Billboard)	34
US Hot Rock & Alternative Songs (Billboard)	19

=== Year-end charts ===
Chart (1991)	Position
Australia (ARIA)	1
Austria (Ö3 Austria Top 40)	2
Belgium (Ultratop)	1
Canada Top Singles (RPM)	1
Canada Adult Contemporary (RPM)	1
Europe (Eurochart Hot 100)	1
Europe (European Hit Radio)	1
Germany (Media Control)	2
Netherlands (Dutch Top 40)	1
Netherlands (Single Top 100)	1
New Zealand (RIANZ)	1
Sweden (Topplistan)	1
Switzerland (Schweizer Hitparade)	3
UK Singles (OCC)	1
US Billboard Hot 100	1
US Adult Contemporary (Billboard)	1
US Cash Box Top 100	1

Chart (1992)	Position
Europe (Eurochart Hot 100)	73
Germany (Media Control)	69

=== Decade-end charts ===
Chart (1990–1999)	Position
Austria (Ö3 Austria Top 40)	7
Belgium (Ultratop 50 Flanders)	5
Canada (Nielsen SoundScan)	8
Canada (Canadian Artists Digital Songs)	4
Netherlands (Dutch Top 40)	10
UK Singles (OCC)	7
US Billboard Hot 100	37

=== All-time charts ===
Chart	Position
Netherlands Love Songs (Dutch Top 40)	12
UK Singles (OCC)	15
US Billboard Hot 100	21

== Certifications and sales ==
Region	Certification	Certified units/sales
Australia (ARIA)	2× Platinum	140,000^{^}
Austria (IFPI Austria)	Platinum	50,000^{*}
Belgium (BRMA)	Platinum	50,000^{*}
Brazil (Pro-Música Brasil)	Platinum	60,000^{‡}
Canada (Music Canada)	2× Platinum	200,000^{^}
Denmark (IFPI Danmark)	Platinum	90,000^{‡}
France (SNEP)	Gold	250,000^{*}
Germany (BVMI)	Platinum	500,000^{^}
Italy (FIMI)	Platinum	100,000^{‡}
Netherlands (NVPI)	Platinum	100,000^{^}
New Zealand (RMNZ)	2× Platinum	60,000^{‡}
Spain (Promusicae)	Platinum	60,000^{‡}
Sweden (GLF)	Platinum	50,000^{^}
United Kingdom (BPI)	3× Platinum	1,850,000
United States (RIAA)	3× Platinum	4,100,000
^{*} Sales figures based on certification alone.^{^} Shipments figures based on certification alone.^{‡} Sales+streaming figures based on certification alone.

== Release history ==
Region	Date	Format(s)	Label(s)	Ref.
United Kingdom	June 17, 1991	7-inch vinyl; 12-inch vinyl; CD; cassette	A&M	
Australia	July 8, 1991	CD; cassette	A&M	
Japan	July 21, 1991	Mini-CD	A&M	

== Fatima Mansions version ==
The Irish band Fatima Mansions released a heavily altered cover of the song as part of an NME tribute album in aid of the charity, the Spastics Society. The single was a double A-side with the Manic Street Preachers' version of "Suicide Is Painless". The single entered the UK top ten in 1992, and reached number 12 in the Republic of Ireland. However, the Manic Street Preachers song received most of the UK radio airplay.

== Brandy version ==
"(Everything I Do) I Do It for You"

Single by Brandy

from the album Never Say Never
- Released: November 1999
- Studio: Chartmaker (Malibu, California); Sony (Culver City, California)
- Genre: R&B
- Length: 4:09
- Label: Atlantic
- Songwriters: Bryan Adams; Michael Kamen; Robert "Mutt" Lange
- Producer: David Foster

Brandy singles chronology
"U Don't Know Me" (1999)	"(Everything I Do) I Do It for You" (1999)	"Another Day in Paradise" (2001)

Audio video
- "(Everything I Do) I Do It for You" on YouTube

American singer Brandy rerecorded "(Everything I Do) I Do It for You" for the standard version of her second studio album, Never Say Never (1998). Producer David Foster reworked the arrangement of the original song, with Dean Parks playing the acoustic guitar.

In 1999, her cover version was released as the album's final single on a double A-side with "U Don't Know Me" on the Oceanic music market, where it reached the top 30 of New Zealand's RIANZ Singles Chart. That same year, she performed the song live at VH1 Divas Live '99 alongside Faith Hill.

=== Track listings ===
- Australian CD single
1. "(Everything I Do) I Do It for You" – 4:10
2. "U Don't Know Me" – 4:29
3. "Have You Ever?" (Soul Skank Remix) – 5:40

=== Credits and personnel ===
Credits are taken from Never Say Never liner notes.

- Composer – Bryan Adams, Michael Kamen, R.J. Lange
- Production – David Foster
- Acoustic guitar – Dean Parks
- Electric guitar – Michael Thompson
- Programming – Felipe Elgueta
- Mixing – Tom Bender
- Recording – Al Schmitt

=== Charts ===
Chart (1999)	Peak position
New Zealand (Recorded Music NZ)	28

== Yuridia version ==
Mexican singer Yuridia released a Spanish cover of the song titled Todo lo que hago lo hago por ti. Released as part of her album titled Habla El Corazón in 2006.

== See also ==
- List of Hot Adult Contemporary number ones of 1991
- List of European number-one airplay songs of the 1990s
