= Loverboy discography =

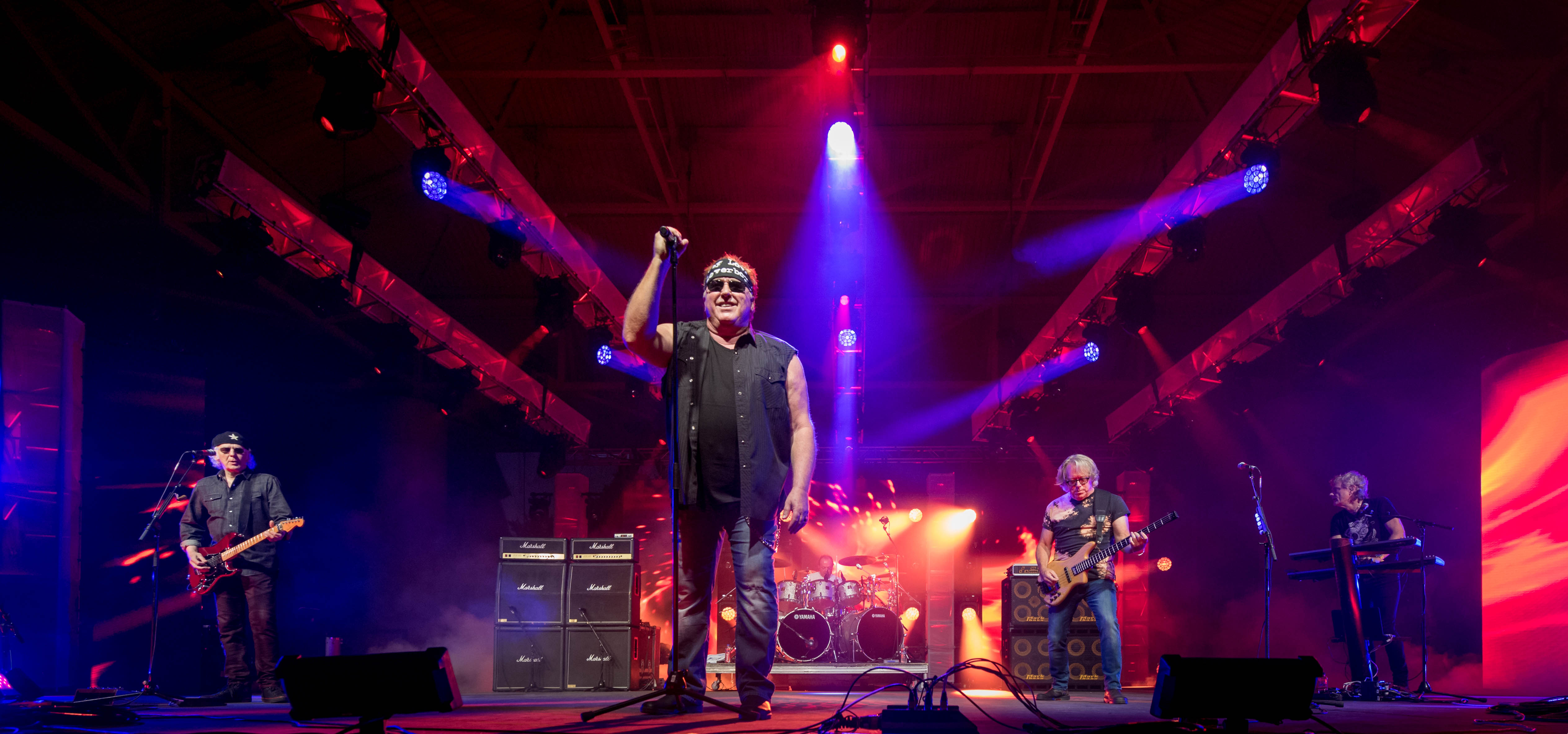
Loverboy performing in 2017

This is the discography for Canadian rock band Loverboy.

== Albums ==
=== Studio albums ===
Year	Album details	Peak chart positions					Certifications (sales threshold)
Year	Album details	AUS	CAN	US	GER	NZ	Certifications (sales threshold)
1980	Loverboy: Release date: October 1980; Label: Columbia Records	5	17	13	—	12	CN: 5× Platinum; US: 2× Platinum
1981	Get Lucky: Release date: October 7, 1981; Label: Columbia Records	70	8	7	—	21	CN: 3× Platinum; US: 4× Platinum
1983	Keep It Up: Release date: June 30, 1983; Label: Columbia Records	—	9	7	25	—	CN: 2× Platinum; US: 2× Platinum
1985	Lovin' Every Minute of It: Release date: August 1985; Label: Columbia Records	—	22	13	54	—	CN: Platinum; US: 2× Platinum
1987	Wildside: Release date: September 1987; Label: Columbia Records	—	21	42	—	—	CN: Gold; US: Gold
1997	Six: Release date: December 4, 1997; Label: CMC International	—	—	—	—	—	
2007	Just Getting Started: Release date: November 27, 2007; Label: eOne Entertainment Canada	—	—	—	—	—	
2012	Rock 'n' Roll Revival: Release date: August 14, 2012; Label: Frontiers Records	—	—	—	—	—	
2014	Unfinished Business: Release date: July 15, 2014; Label: Loverboy Music	—	—	—	—	—	
"—" denotes a recording that did not chart or was not released in that territory.

=== Live albums ===
Year	Album details
1981	Loverboy – Live EP: Release date: 1981; Label: Columbia; This is a live, three-track, white label promo released by Columbia on vinyl ONLY. Columbia number XSM 168602.; The tracks are: "Teenage Overdose" (4:46), "Lady of the 80s" (4:25), and "The Kid Is Hot Tonite" (6:16).
2001	Live, Loud and Loose (1982 - 1986): Release date: June 19, 2001; Label: Sony Music/Columbia Records; Note: Re-released in 2011 as Setlist: The Very Best of Loverboy Live
2010	Loverboy: Extended Versions (Live): Release date: January 29, 2010; Label: SBCMG; Note: All songs on this album are live versions of hit songs by Loverboy recorded on tour in the US states of Georgia and North Carolina in 2005.
2024	Loverboy Live in '82: Release date: June 7, 2024; Label: earMusic

=== Compilation albums ===
Year	Album	Peak positions	Certifications (sales threshold)
Year	Album	US	Certifications (sales threshold)
1984	The Official Music of the 1984 Games: Release Date: 1984; Label: CBS, Columbia; Note: This album is NOT a compilation album composed entirely of songs by Loverboy. It does, however, contain an original song by Loverboy called "Nothing's Gonna Stop You Now" (track #2) that did not appear on any other Loverboy album or compilation until Sony's 2013 budget compilation, Loverboy the 80s. This track was referred to as being the Team Sports Theme at the Olympics in 1984.	—	
1989	Big Ones: Release Date: October 25, 1989; Label: Columbia; Note: "For You", "Ain't Looking for Love," and "Too Hot" are all-new tracks originally released on this album only. While released by the band as a single on August 2, 1986, "Heaven in Your Eyes" is found for the first time on a Loverboy album on Big Ones. It was also released on the Top Gun movie soundtrack in 1986.	189	
1994	Loverboy Classics: Release Date: October 11, 1994; Label: Columbia	—	US: Gold
1995	Temperature's Rising: Release Date: April 11, 1995; Label: Sony Music, Columbia	—	
1997	Super Hits: Release Date: August 26, 1997; Label: Sony Music	—	
2003	Love Songs: Release Date: January 14, 2003; Label: Legacy; Note: This compilation album contains the song "Sword and Stone," originally from the Paul Dean album Hardcore (1989). It isn't otherwise found on any other Loverboy album or compilation, although it was first written and recorded in demo form by Kiss and recorded subsequently by Dean and other artists.	—	
2004	Collections: Release Date: 2004; Label: Sony Music	—	
2005	Rock Breakout Years: 1985: Release Date: October 11, 2005; Label: Madacy Records	—	
2006	We Are the 80s: Loverboy: Release Date: July 18, 2006; Label: Columbia, Legacy	—	
2006	Loverboy / Get Lucky: Release Date: 2006; Label: BGO Records; A remastered and double album re-release of the first two complete Loverboy albums. This single disc import contains all new album notes for both albums.	—	
2006	Keep It Up / Lovin' Every Minute of It: Release Date: 2006; Label: BGO Records; A remastered and double album re-release of the third and fourth complete Loverboy albums. This single disc import contains all new album notes for both albums.	—	
2007	Turn Me Loose: Release Date: May 29, 2007; Label: Sony Music	—	
2008	Playlist: The Very Best of Loverboy: Release Date: August 19, 2008; Label: Sony, Legacy	—	
2009	Greatest Hits... The Real Thing: Release Date: April 14, 2009; Label: Columbia	—	
2009	Metropolis - Original Motion Picture Soundtrack: Release Date: 1984 (December 16, 2009, on CD); Label: CBS; Note: This album is NOT a compilation album composed entirely of songs by Loverboy. It does, however, contain an original song by Loverboy called "Destruction" (track #7) that does not appear on any other Loverboy album or compilation.	—	
2013	Loverboy Original Album Classics: Release Date: June 25, 2013; Label: Sony Legacy; Note: This is a five-disc set of the first five Loverboy albums. The five discs are un-remastered audio copies of the original albums and contain no new tracks.	—	
"—" denotes releases that did not chart

== Singles ==
Year	Single	Peak chart positions						Certifications (sales thresholds)	Album
Year	Single	CAN	US	US Main	US AC	AUS	NZ	Certifications (sales thresholds)	Album
1980	"Turn Me Loose"	7	35	6	—	3	5	CN: Gold; RMNZ: Gold	Loverboy
1980	"Lady of the 80s"	43	—	—	—	—	—		Loverboy
1981	"The Kid Is Hot Tonite"	30	55	42	—	76	—		Loverboy
1981	"Working for the Weekend"	10	29	2	—	19	11	RMNZ: Gold	Get Lucky
1982	"When It's Over"	17	26	21	—	—	—		Get Lucky
1982	"Take Me to the Top"	—	—	23	—	—	—		Get Lucky
1982	"Lucky Ones"	—	—	36	—	—	—		Get Lucky
1982	"Jump"	—	101	—	—	—	—		Get Lucky
1983	"Strike Zone"	—	—	23	—	—	—		Keep It Up
1983	"Hot Girls in Love"	9	11	2	—	—	—		Keep It Up
1983	"Queen of the Broken Hearts"	28	34	11	—	—	—		Keep It Up
1985	"Lovin' Every Minute of It"	17	9	3	—	77	—		Lovin' Every Minute of It
1985	"Dangerous"	37	65	23	—	—	—		Lovin' Every Minute of It
1986	"This Could Be the Night"	44	10	9	30	—	—		Lovin' Every Minute of It
1986	"Lead a Double Life"	—	68	—	—	—	—		Lovin' Every Minute of It
1986	"Heaven in Your Eyes"	24	12	—	—	—	—		Top Gun (soundtrack)
1987	"Notorious"	24	38	8	—	—	—		Wildside
1987	"Love Will Rise Again"	—	—	—	—	—	—		Wildside
1988	"Break It to Me Gently"	—	—	—	—	—	—		Wildside
1989	"Too Hot"	—	84	27	—	—	—		Big Ones (compilation)
1997	"Big Picture" (promo)	—	—	—	—	—	—		Six
2007	"The One That Got Away"	—	—	—	—	—	—		Just Getting Started
2011	"Heartbreaker"	—	—	—	—	—	—		Rock 'n' Roll Revival
2014	"Countin' the Nights"	—	—	—	—	—	—		Unfinished Business
2016	"Hurtin'"	—	—	—	—	—	—		Non-album singles
2017	"Some Like It Hot"	—	—	—	—	—	—		Non-album singles
2017	"Stop the Rain"	—	—	—	—	—	—		Non-album singles
2020	"Gimme Back My Life"	—	—	—	—	—	—		Non-album singles
2022	"Release"	—	—	—	—	—	—		Non-album singles
"—" denotes releases that did not chart

=== Soundtrack appearances ===
Title	Release	Soundtrack
"Destruction"	1984	Metropolis
"Almost Paradise"	1984	Footloose
"Heaven in Your Eyes"	1986	Top Gun

== Videography ==
=== Video albums ===
Year	Album details
1984	Loverboy: Live: Release date: 1984; Label: Pioneer Artists (LaserDisc), Vestron (VHS); Live at the Pacific Coliseum in Vancouver, Canada on May 21, 1982
Year	Album details
1986	Any Way You Look at It: Release date: 1986; Label: CBS/Fox (VHS); Nine selected music videos from their first four albums

=== Music videos ===
Year	Title	Director
1980	"Turn Me Loose"	
1980	"The Kid Is Hot Tonite"	
1981	"Lucky Ones"	
1981	"Working for the Weekend"	
1981	"When It's Over"	
1981	"Gangs in the Street"	
1981	"Jump"	
1983	"Queen of the Broken Hearts"	
1983	"Hot Girls in Love"	
1985	"Lovin' Every Minute of It"	
1985	"This Could Be the Night"	
1985	"Dangerous"	
1986	"Heaven in Your Eyes"	
1987	"Notorious"	
1987	"Love Will Rise Again"	
1987	"Break It to Me Gently"	
2012	"Heartbreaker"	
2016	"Hurtin"	
2017	"Stop The Rain"	
2022	"Release"	
