= Big Ones (Loverboy album) =

Greatest hits album by Loverboy
- Released: October 11, 1989
- Genre: Rock
- Length: 64:11
- Label: Columbia
- Producer: Bruce Fairbairn; Tom Allom; Bob Rock

Loverboy chronology
| Wildside (1987) | Big Ones (1989) | Loverboy Classics (1994) |

Professional ratings
Review scores
| Source | Rating |
|---|---|
| Allmusic | 4/5 stars |

Big Ones is a compilation album released in 1989 by the Canadian rock band Loverboy. The album was the band's first compilation, including hit tracks such as "Working for the Weekend" and "Lovin' Every Minute of it". The compilation includes 3 new studio tracks: "For You", "Ain't Looking for Love" and "Too Hot". It was also released in the same year that the band decided to break up a second time, and another compilation would not be released until five years later.

== Track listing ==
| No. | Title | Writer(s) | Original Album | Length |
|---|---|---|---|---|
| 1. | "Working for the Weekend" | Paul Dean; Mike Reno; Matt Frenetta | Get Lucky (1981) | 3:39 |
| 2. | "For You" | Paul Dean; Mike Reno; Kenny Kaos | New song | 5:46 |
| 3. | "The Kid Is Hot Tonite" | Paul Dean; Bernie Aubin | Loverboy (1980) | 4:21 |
| 4. | "Lovin' Every Minute Of It" | Robert John Lange | Lovin' Every Minute of It (1985) | 3:31 |
| 5. | "Lucky Ones" | Paul Dean; Mike Reno; Scott Smith; Denise Thurlow | Get Lucky | 3:48 |
| 6. | "Hot Girls in Love" | Paul Dean; Bruce Fairbairn | Keep It Up (1983) | 3:56 |
| 7. | "This Could Be the Night" | Paul Dean; Mike Reno; Bill Wray; Jonathan Cain | Lovin' Every Minute of It | 4:55 |
| 8. | "Ain't Looking for Love" | Paul Dean; Mike Reno | New song | 4:34 |
| 9. | "Turn Me Loose" | Paul Dean; Mike Reno | Loverboy | 5:35 |
| 10. | "Notorious" | Paul Dean; Mike Reno; Jon Bon Jovi; Richie Sambora; Todd Cerney | Wildside (1987) | 4:36 |
| 11. | "When It's Over" | Paul Dean; Mike Reno | Get Lucky | 5:02 |
| 12. | "Too Hot" | Paul Dean; Mike Reno | New song | 4:19 |
| 13. | "Take Me to the Top" | Paul Dean; Mike Reno; Doug Johnson | Get Lucky | 6:09 |
| 14. | "Heaven in Your Eyes" | Paul Dean; Mike Reno; Mae Moore; John R. Dexter | Top Gun soundtrack (1986) | 4:00 |
| Total length: | | | | 64:11 |

Note

- Tracks 7 and 14 are bonus tracks on the CD and cassette versions.
- Track 14, while previously released as a single and on the soundtrack to the film Top Gun, makes its first appearance on a Loverboy album here.
- Keyboard player Doug Johnson's photo does not appear on the album's back cover, although all four other members do.
- Track information and credits verified from AllMusic, and the album's liner notes.

== Personnel ==
- Mike Reno - lead vocals
- Paul Dean - guitar, backing vocals
- Doug Johnson - keyboards
- Scott Smith - bass
- Matt Frenette - drums

=== Production ===
- Bruce Fairbairn - Producer
- Paul Dean - Producer
- Tom Allom - Producer
- Mark Dodson - Engineer
- Michael Fraser - Engineer, Assistant Engineer
- Ken Lomas - Assistant Engineer
- Bob Rock - Producer, Engineer
- Randy Staub - Engineer
- Keith Stein - Engineer
- Chris Taylor - Assistant Engineer
- Dave Ogilvie - Assistant Engineer
- John Dexter - Producer
- Mark Burdett - Art Direction
- James O'Mara - Photography
- Ron Obvious - Assistant Engineer
- Sandee Bathgate - Production Coordination
- Rob Porter - Assistant Engineer
