= Juno Awards of 1982 =

Canadian music awards ceremony

- Date: 14 April 1982
- Venue: Harbour Castle Hilton, Toronto, Ontario
- Hosted by: Burton Cummings

Television/radio coverage
- Network: CBC

The Juno Awards of 1982, representing Canadian music industry achievements of the previous year, were awarded on 14 April 1982 in Toronto at a ceremony hosted by Burton Cummings at the Harbour Castle Hilton Convention Centre in the Grand Metropolitan Ballroom.

The biggest winner this year was Loverboy with a record six awards in various categories including Group, Album and Single of the Year. To date this record number of wins in a single Juno year still stands.

== Awards ceremony ==
The original plan for the 1982 ceremonies was to have David Steinberg in Toronto, while Burton Cummings would co-host the broadcast live from the Commodore Ballroom in Vancouver, British Columbia. Juno organisers CARAS cancelled that plan on 15 February citing fears of "fragmentation" of the ceremonies with a dual city hosting approach. This resulted in some talk of hosting the Junos in Vancouver for 1983 but this would not be accomplished until 1991.

CARAS scheduled a music industry conference with guest speakers author Alvin Toffler and producer Bob Ezrin prior to the Juno awards event in an attempt to expand on the occasion. This was cancelled due to lack of advance registrations but this situation did not affect plans for the Juno ceremonies themselves.

Tickets to the ceremonies were priced at $115 for people who were not members of Juno organisers CARAS, and $85 for members. All tickets to the ceremonies were reportedly sold.

Performers during the show included Rough Trade, Liona Boyd, Ronnie Hawkins and B.B. Gabor. The comedic duo of Bob and Doug McKenzie presented the awards for "Most Promising Male Vocalist", "Most Promising Female Vocalist" and "Group of the Year".

When Eddie Schwartz went to the podium to give his acceptance speech for the "Most Promising Male Vocalist" award he took a big drink of beer on live TV. Afterwards two Royal Canadian Mounted Police officers approached Schwartz and reprimanded him, telling him that was illegal before finally releasing him back into the show.

A clean cut Neil Young dressed in a tuxedo accepted his "Canadian Music Hall of Fame" award with a very short speech acknowledging his family and that he was "proud to be a Canadian". He would expand on his thoughts on the award and the current state of the Canadian music scene in a post-Juno Awards show broadcast on CBC following the main ceremonies.

The Juno Awards television broadcast on CBC set a new record with an estimated 2,170,000 viewers.

== Nominees and winners ==
Most nominations were announced 28 February 1982, with certain nominations in classical, jazz and album graphics categories announced 12 March 1982.

Performers Raffi and Sharon, Lois & Bram did not enter their albums for the Juno children's category, as they felt the Junos were about popularity rather than artistry.

Anne Murray continued her streak of absence despite winning two prime awards again this year.

A tie was issued this year for the "Recording Engineer of the Year" award, and Rush was nominated twice in the "Best Album Graphics" category for two of their albums.

=== Female Vocalist of the Year ===
Winner: Anne Murray

Other nominees:

- Carroll Baker
- Lisa Dal Bello
- Joni Mitchell
- Carole Pope

=== Male Vocalist of the Year ===
Winner: Bruce Cockburn

Other nominees:

- Burton Cummings
- Gordon Lightfoot
- Gino Vannelli
- Neil Young

=== Most Promising Female Vocalist of the Year ===
Winner: Shari Ulrich

Other nominees:

- Salome Bey
- Terry Crawford
- Rita Johns
- Karen Silver

=== Most Promising Male Vocalist of the Year ===
Winner: Eddie Schwartz

Other nominees:

- B. B. Gabor
- Jim Byrnes
- Gary O'
- Peter Pringle

=== Group of the Year ===
Winner: Loverboy

Other nominees:

- April Wine
- Prism
- The Rovers
- Rush

=== Most Promising Group of the Year ===
Winner: Saga

Other nominees:

- Goddo
- The Kings
- Martha and the Muffins
- Red Rider

=== Composer of the Year ===
Winner: Mike Reno and Paul Dean, "Turn Me Loose" by Loverboy

Other nominees:

- Bill Henderson and Brian MacLeod, "My Girl" by Chilliwack
- Jack Lavin "Thirsty Ears" by Powder Blues Band
- Baron Longfellow, "Amour" (Longfellow was a pseudonym of Andy Kim)
- Kevan Staples and Carole Pope, "High School Confidential" by Carole Pope

=== Country Female Vocalist of the Year ===
Winner: Anne Murray

Other nominees:

- Carroll Baker
- Marie Bottrell
- Iris Larratt
- Laura Vinson

=== Country Male Vocalist of the Year ===
Winner: Ronnie Hawkins

Other nominees:

- Terry Carlisse
- Wilf Carter
- Harold MacIntyre
- Lee Marlow

=== Country Group or Duo of the Year ===
Winner: The Good Brothers

Other nominees:

- Family Brown
- The Mercey Brothers
- The Rovers
- Showdown

=== Folk Artist of the Year ===
Winner: Bruce Cockburn

Other nominees:

- Gordon Lightfoot
- Joni Mitchell
- The Rovers
- Valdy

=== Instrumental Artist of the Year ===
Winner: Liona Boyd

Other nominees:

- The Emeralds
- André Gagnon
- Hagood Hardy
- Frank Mills

=== Producer of the Year ===
Winner: Paul Dean / Bruce Fairbairn, "Working for the Weekend" and "When It's Over" by Loverboy

Other nominees:

- Kerry Crawford / Jon Goldsmith, "Take Off" by Bob & Doug McKenzie
- Fred Mollin, "Only The Lucky" and "Lodi" by Ronnie Hawkins
- Eddie Schwartz / David Tyson, "All Our Tomorrows" and "Tonight" by Eddie Schwartz
- Ian Thomas, "Hold On" and "Stringing a Line" by Ian Thomas

=== Recording Engineer of the Year ===
Winner (tied):

- Gary Gray, "Attitude" and "For Those Who Think Young" by Carole Pope and Rough Trade
- Bob Rock and Keith Stein, "When It's Over" and "It's Your Life" by Loverboy

Other nominees:

- David Greene, "Battlescar" and "Blue River Liquor Shine" by Max Webster
- Paul Northfield, "Tom Sawyer" and "Red Barchetta" by Rush
- Hayward Parrott, "Plaisir d'Amour" and "Prelude to Romance" by Frank Mills

=== Canadian Music Hall of Fame ===
Winner: Neil Young

== Nominated and winning albums ==
=== Album of the Year ===
Winner: Loverboy, Loverboy

Other nominees:

- Exit...Stage Left, Rush
- The Great White North, Bob and Doug McKenzie
- Moving Pictures, Rush
- The Nature of the Beast, April Wine

=== Best Album Graphics ===
Winner: Hugh Syme and Deborah Samuel, Moving Pictures by Rush

Other nominees:

- Dave Buck, Footloose (self-titled)
- Richard Desmarais, Butler
- Dean Motter, But I'm Just a Kid (self-titled, featuring Mark Domenico, Larry Lacy and Ricky Yorke)
- Hugh Syme and Deborah Samuel, Exit...Stage Left by Rush

=== Best Children's Album ===
Winner: Inch By Inch, Sandra Beech

Other nominees:

- Big Bird and Oscar the Grouch, Camping in Canada (various artists)
- The Cats - Getting Ready for Christmas, The Children's Hour Productions Orchestra
- Listen to the Children, Bob Schneider
- The Polka Dot Pony, Fred Penner

=== Best Classical Album of the Year ===
Winner: Ravel: Daphnis Et Chloe (Complete Ballet), Montreal Symphony Orchestra, Charles Dutoit Conductor

Other nominees:

- Mozart's Serenade for 12 Winds and Double Bass, Toronto Chamber Winds
- Rodrigo's Concerto de Aranjuez and Fantasia Para Un Gentilhombre, Montreal Symphony Orchestra, Charles Dutoit - Conductor
- Rossini-Respighi's La Boutique Fantastique, Toronto Symphony Orchestra
- York Winds (woodwind quintets), York Winds

=== International Album of the Year ===
Winner: Double Fantasy, John Lennon

Other nominees:

- Crimes of Passion, Pat Benatar
- Guilty, Barbra Streisand
- Hi Infidelity, REO Speedwagon
- Stars on Long Play, Stars on 45

=== Best Jazz Album ===
Winner: The Brass Connection, The Brass Connection

Other nominees:

- Au Privave, Wray Downes and Dave Young
- Clear Vision, Joe Sealy
- Jump Street, Peter Leitch
- Live in Digital, Rob McConnell and the Boss Brass

=== Comedy Album of the Year ===
Winner: The Great White North, Bob & Doug McKenzie

Other nominees:

- An Evening With Stephen Leacock, John Stark
- Charlie Farquharson's Bible Stories, Don Harron
- It's Not the Heat, It's the Humility, Ted Woloshyn

== Nominated and winning releases ==
=== Best Selling Single ===
Winner: "Turn Me Loose", Loverboy

Other nominees:

- "Amour" by Baron Longfellow
- "High School Confidential" by Rough Trade
- "My Girl" by Chilliwack
- "Thirsty Ears" by Powder Blues

=== International Single of the Year ===
Winner: "Bette Davis Eyes", Kim Carnes

Other nominees:

- "Celebration", Kool & the Gang
- "Endless Love", Diana Ross and Lionel Richie
- "Stars on 45", Stars on 45
- "The Tide Is High", Blondie

== Bibliography ==
- Krewen, Nick. (2010). Music from far and wide: Celebrating 40 years of the Juno Awards. Key Porter Books Limited, Toronto. ISBN 978-1-55470-339-5
