= Rock 'n' Roll Revival =

Studio album by Loverboy
- Released: August 14, 2012
- Recorded: The Warehouse Studio, Vancouver, Canada
- Genre: Rock
- Length: 57:59
- Label: Frontiers
- Producer: Paul Dean, Bob Rock

Loverboy chronology
Greatest Hits... The Real Thing (2009)	Rock 'n' Roll Revival (2012)	Unfinished Business (2014)

Professional ratings
Review scores
Source	Rating
AllMusic	1.5/5 stars

Rock 'n' Roll Revival is the eighth studio album by the Canadian rock band Loverboy. The album features nine classic Loverboy songs re-recorded for the album by the current lineup, as well as three new songs. The three new songs were recorded with Bob Rock at Bryan Adams' Warehouse Studio in Vancouver, BC.

== Track listing ==
Track Title	Composer(s)	Length	Original Appearance
01 "Rock 'n' Roll Revival"	(Paul Dean/Mike Reno)	4:15	New recording
02 "No Tomorrow"	(Paul Dean/Jaren Johnston/Mike Reno/Bob Rock)	4:42	New recording
03 "Heartbreaker"	(Paul Dean/Jaren Johnston/Mike Reno/Bob Rock)	3:57	New recording
04 "Turn Me Loose"	(Paul Dean/Mike Reno)	5:58	Loverboy
05 "Working for the Weekend"	(Paul Dean/Matt Frenette/Mike Reno)	3:53	Get Lucky
06 "Lovin' Every Minute of It"	(Robert John "Mutt" Lange)	5:23	Lovin' Every Minute of It
07 "The Kid Is Hot Tonight"	(Bernie Aubin/Paul Dean)	4:32	Loverboy
08 "Lucky Ones"	(Paul Dean/Mike Reno/Scott Smith/Denise Thurlow)	4:05	Get Lucky
09 "Always on My Mind"	(Paul Dean/Mike Reno)	3:43	Loverboy
10 "Queen of the Broken Hearts"	(Paul Dean/Mike Reno)	4:03	Keep It Up
11 "When It's Over"	(Paul Dean/Mike Reno)	5:35	Get Lucky
12 "Hot Girls in Love"	(Paul Dean/Bruce Fairbairn)	7:58	Keep It Up

== Personnel ==
- Mike Reno - lead vocals
- Paul Dean - guitar, backing vocals
- Doug Johnson - keyboards, backing vocals
- Ken "Spider" Sinnaeve - bass, backing vocals
- Matt Frenette - drums

=== Additional personnel ===
- Kelly Brock - backing vocals
- Catherine St. Germain - backing vocals
