= Notorious (Loverboy song) =

1987 song by Loverboy

Single by Loverboy

from the album Wildside
- B-side: "Wildside"
- Released: August 1987
- Genre: Pop rock
- Length: 4:37
- Label: Columbia
- Songwriter(s): Jon Bon Jovi; Richie Sambora; Mike Reno; Paul Dean; Todd Cerney
- Producer(s): Bruce Fairbairn

Loverboy singles chronology
"Heaven in Your Eyes" (1986)	"Notorious" (1987)	"Love Will Rise Again" (1987)

Music video
- "Notorious" on YouTube

"Notorious" is a song by Canadian rock band Loverboy co-written by Jon Bon Jovi. It is the lead track of Wildside, peaking at number 24 and 38 on the Canadian and US charts, becoming the band's last Top 40 single in both countries. The music video was directed by David Fincher through his Propaganda Films company.

== Release ==
The song debuted at number 91 on August 22, 1987, and stayed there for fourteen weeks. It peaked at number 38 in the week of October 17, 1987. There was also a picture disc release, which features the cover from Wildside. It also peaked at number 8 on the US Rock charts.

== Track listing ==
7" single

1. "Notorious" – 4:37
2. "Wildside" – 3:32

European 12" single

1. "Notorious" – 4:37
2. "Wildside" – 3:32
3. "Turn Me Loose" – 5:35

UK 12" single

1. "Notorious" – 4:37
2. "Wildside" – 3:32
3. "Turn Me Loose" – 5:35
4. "Emotional" – 4:50

== Chart performances ==
Chart (1987)	Peak position
Canadian RPM Top Singles	24
U.S. Billboard Hot 100	38
U.S. Billboard Top Rock Tracks	8
