= Little Mountain Sound Studios =

Recording studio in Vancouver

Little Mountain Sound Studios was a music recording facility in Vancouver, British Columbia, Canada. From the 1970s through the 1990s, it was the most successful recording studio in Western Canada and the home for many years to producers Bruce Fairbairn and Bob Rock. Albums by Aerosmith, Bon Jovi, AC/DC, Metallica, Bryan Adams, Mötley Crüe, David Lee Roth, Loverboy, Dan Reed Network, and the Cult, among many others, were recorded there. The studio closed in April 1993.

== History ==
Little Mountain Sound Studios was started in 1972 as a 50/50 partnership between Western Broadcasting (CKNW radio) and Griffiths, Gibson Productions (GGP).

Bob Brooks was hired to manage Little Mountain. Brooks was an independent producer working out of an office at CKWX after having left Homer Street Studios. In 1977, Western Broadcasting bought out GGP to become sole owner. In 1982, Western Broadcasting sold the studio to Bob Brooks.

Bruce Fairbairn started recording at Little Mountain Sound Studios with Prism, a band in which he played trumpet. Fairbairn would go on to do the bulk of his work there as an independent producer. Bob Rock & Mike Fraser were house engineers at Little Mountain. They engineered many albums for Fairbairn before becoming producers themselves. Brooks turned over the running of the studio to a manager in the late 1980s. Brooks then replaced the manager with Bruce Levens, who purchased Little Mountain after managing for six months. The studio was sold and closed in April 1993.

== Clients ==
The Goose Creek Symphony

- Head foe the Hills (1976)

Olivia Newton-John

- "Don't Cry for Me Argentina" (1977) – engineered by Armin Steiner

Loverboy

- Loverboy (1980) – produced by Fairbairn, engineered by Fraser
- Get Lucky (1981) – mixing; co-produced by Fairbairn, assistant engineered by Fraser
- Keep It Up (1983) – mixing; co-produced by Fairbairn, assistant engineered by Fraser
- Lovin' Every Minute of It (1985) - Assistant Engineer Ron Obvious
- Wildside (1987) – produced by Fairbairn

Bryan Adams

- Reckless (1984) – partial; assistant engineered by Mike Fraser

The Cheer

- "Shot with Our Own Guns" (1986) – produced by Bob Rock, engineered by Fraser

Bon Jovi

- Slippery When Wet (1986) – produced by Fairbairn, engineered by Rock
- New Jersey (1988) – produced by Fairbairn, engineered by Rock
- Keep the Faith (1992) – produced by Rock

Aerosmith (produced by Fairbairn)

- Permanent Vacation (1987)
- Pump (1989)
- Get a Grip (1993)
- The studio figures prominently in the Aerosmith documentary The Making of Pump (1990).

Mötley Crüe

- Dr. Feelgood (1989) – produced by Rock
- Decade of Decadence (1991)

The Cult

- Sonic Temple (1989) – produced by Rock

Poison

- Flesh & Blood (1990) – co-produced by Fairbairn and Fraser

Metallica

- Metallica (1991) – partial; co-produced by Rock

David Coverdale and Jimmy Page

- Coverdale–Page (1993) – initial recording; co-produced by Fraser

Van Halen

- Balance (1995) – vocals; produced by Fairbairn

Additionally, the British Columbia Rapid Transit Company (now part of Translink) recorded the chimes for the Skytrain system in 1984–1985.
