= Hard Core (Paul Dean album) =

Studio album by Paul Dean
- Released: January 1989
- Recorded: Venture Studios, Little Mountain Sound Studios, Mushroom Studios, Vancouver, British Columbia, Winter 1988/Spring 1989
- Genre: Hard rock
- Length: 40:19
- Label: CBS LP - 44462, 462977-2/1
- Producer: Paul Dean & Brian "Too Loud" MacLeod

Paul Dean chronology
Brutus (1975)	Hard Core (1989)	Machine (1995)

Singles from Hard Core
- 1. "Sword & Stone" Released: 1989; 2. "Draw the Line" Released: 1989

Professional ratings
Review scores
Source	Rating
Allmusic	2.5/5 stars
Kerrang!	4/5 stars

Hard Core is the first solo album by Canadian musician Paul Dean, released in January 1989. The first track, "Sword & Stone", was demoed by Kiss for their Crazy Nights album in 1987, and later additionally recorded by the German rockers, Bonfire, in 1989 for the film Shocker and its accompanying soundtrack.

The song "Draw the Line", written by Bryan Adams and Jim Vallance, was originally recorded by Adams for his hit 1984 album Reckless but was left off the final track list. Adams' version eventually saw a release on the 30th anniversary reissue of Reckless. It was also recorded and released by Ted Nugent with Brian Howe on lead vocals in 1984 on his Penetrator album.

== Track listing ==
1. "Sword & Stone" (Desmond Child, Paul Stanley, Bruce Kulick) - 4:06
2. "Doctor" (Paul Dean) - 4:52
3. "Draw the Line" (Bryan Adams, Jim Vallance) - 4:11
4. "Dirty Fingers" (Taylor Rhodes, Tom DeLuca) - 4:02
5. "Under the Gun" (Dean, Mike Reno, Jon Bon Jovi, Richie Sambora) - 3:39
6. "Action" (Dean, Matt Frenette, Ken "Spider" Sinnaeve, Kenny Shields, Daryl Guthiel) - 5:10
7. "Down to the Bottom" (Dean) - 5:17
8. "Black Sheep" (Dean, Rhodes, Terry Cerney) - 4:09
9. "Politics" (Dean, Brian MacLeod, Foster) - 4:53

== Musicians ==
- Paul Dean (vocals, guitar, bass guitar, backing vocals)
- Brian MacLeod (drums, keyboards, key bass, backing vocals)
- Matt Frenette (drums on track 6)
- Spider Sinnaeve (bass guitar on track 6)
- Jon Bon Jovi (harp on track 5)
- Dave Steele (backing vocals)
- Marc LaFrance (backing vocals)
- Ricky Renouf (backing vocals)
- Geraldo Dominelli (backing vocals)
- Vern Wills (backing vocals)
- Frank Felder (backing vocals)
- Gregg Sheehan (backing vocals)
- Rosalind Keene (backing vocals)
- Nashy Nash (backing vocals)

== Production ==
- Produced by Paul Dean and Brian MacLeod.
- Mixed by Bob Rock at Little Mountain Sound Studios, Vancouver, BC; except tracks 6, 7 and 9, mixed by Paul Dean.
- Recorded at Venture Studios, Vancouver, BC, by Larry Vogel.
- Additional overdubs recorded at Little Mountain Sound Studios, Vancouver, BC, by Tim Crich and Ken Lomas; and at Mushroom Studios in Vancouver, BC, by Dale Penner.

== Chart positions ==
Chart (1989)	Peak position
Canada (RPM 100 Albums)	45
US (Billboard 200)	195
US AOR Albums (Radio & Records)	26
