= Doug Johnson (Loverboy) =

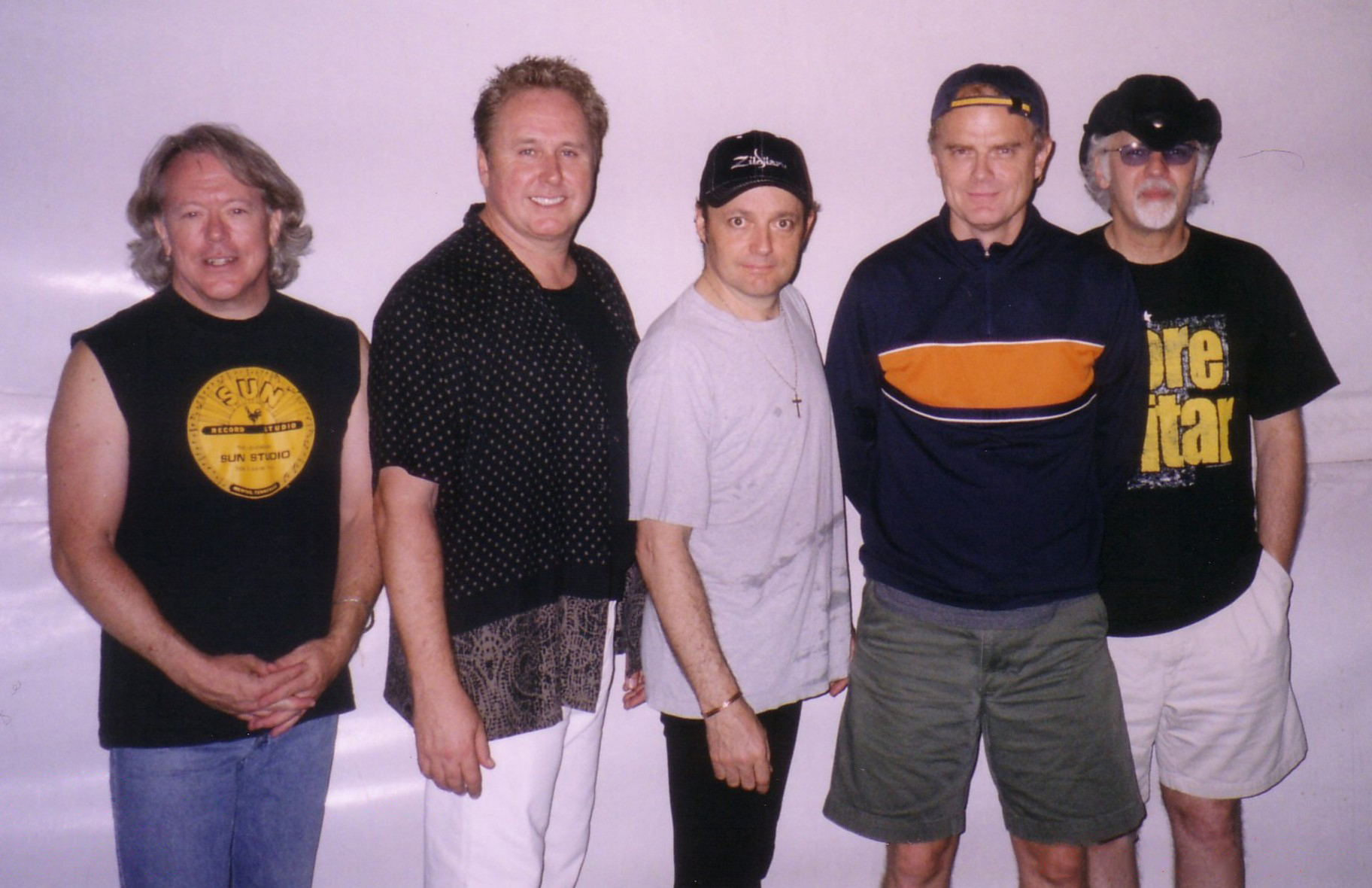
- Loverboy in July 2003 Johnson is second from the right

Background information
- Born: December 19, 1957 (age 68); New Westminster, British Columbia, Canada
- Instruments: Keyboards, saxophone
- Years active: 1978–present
- Member of: Loverboy
- Formerly of: Fosterchild

Douglas Johnson (born December 19, 1957) is a Canadian keyboard player and composer. He is an original member of Loverboy, a group founded in 1979.

== Early life ==
Johnson was born in New Westminster, British Columbia on December 19, 1957. His grandparents emigrated to Saskatchewan in Canada from Sweden in the 1920s. In high school, he played clarinet and saxophone.

He was a classically trained pianist like his mother. He took his first lesson at age four and completed a classical degree at eighteen, playing songs by Bach and Debussy, as well as taking jazz lessons. Seeing The Beatles on The Ed Sullivan Show inspired Johnson to perform.

== Career ==
In 1978, he joined Fosterchild as a keyboardist shortly after their second album, Troubled Child, was released, but only stayed for a short tour promoting the album. Johnson was in the band for a year, and when he left he started a new project with Paul Dean. This project would become the band Loverboy.

With Loverboy, Johnson plays keyboards, saxophone, harmonica and vocals. In 1986, they recorded "Heaven in Your Eyes", which was used in the film Top Gun. Johnson refused to appear in the music video as he believed the song was pro-military and glorifying war, which he opposed.

In 1985, Johnson and Paul Dean and Mike Reno of Loverboy took part in the recording of the charity single "Tears Are Not Enough" released under the name Northern Lights and featuring many Canadian artists including Joni Mitchell, Burton Cummings, and Gordon Lightfoot.

Equipment Johnson has known to have used includes Yamaha CS-50, Yamaha SS30, Sequential Circuits Prophet-5 and Yamaha CP-70 Electric Grand Piano.

Johnson's composings have been heard on film, television and radio, including the 2017 documentary RiverBlue and the 2010 Winter Olympics. He made a solo album, Notes to Self in 2014.

== Personal life ==
On November 26, 2020, Johnson received a Doctor of Letter, honoris causa at the University of British Columbia.

He is a life long resident of Surrey, British Columbia.
