= Chippendales Audition =

Saturday Night Live sketch

"Chippendales Audition" (Note: Also sometimes referred to as "Chippendales" or the Chippendales sketch.) is a comedy sketch which aired on October 27, 1990, during the 16th season of Saturday Night Live. It stars Chris Farley and guest host Patrick Swayze as dancers auditioning for the male burlesque troupe Chippendales. The sketch's humor largely stems from the incongruity of the overweight Farley performing energetic and erotic dance moves, with his body, which the judges later describe as "fat and flabby", contrasting with the trim, muscular body of Swayze. Heightening the absurdity, the panel judging the men considers them to be closely matched, repeatedly emphasizing the difficulty of choosing between them.

"Chippendales Audition" was well received by SNL's audience and has been remembered as one of the show's most iconic sketches. Occurring on Farley's fourth episode as a cast member, the sketch was instrumental in his rise to stardom. Contemporary SNL cast and writers are sharply divided in their assessments of the sketch, with some strongly criticizing it as lazy and mean-spirited humor at the expense of Farley's weight, and others praising it as one of the funniest sketches of all time.

== Summary ==
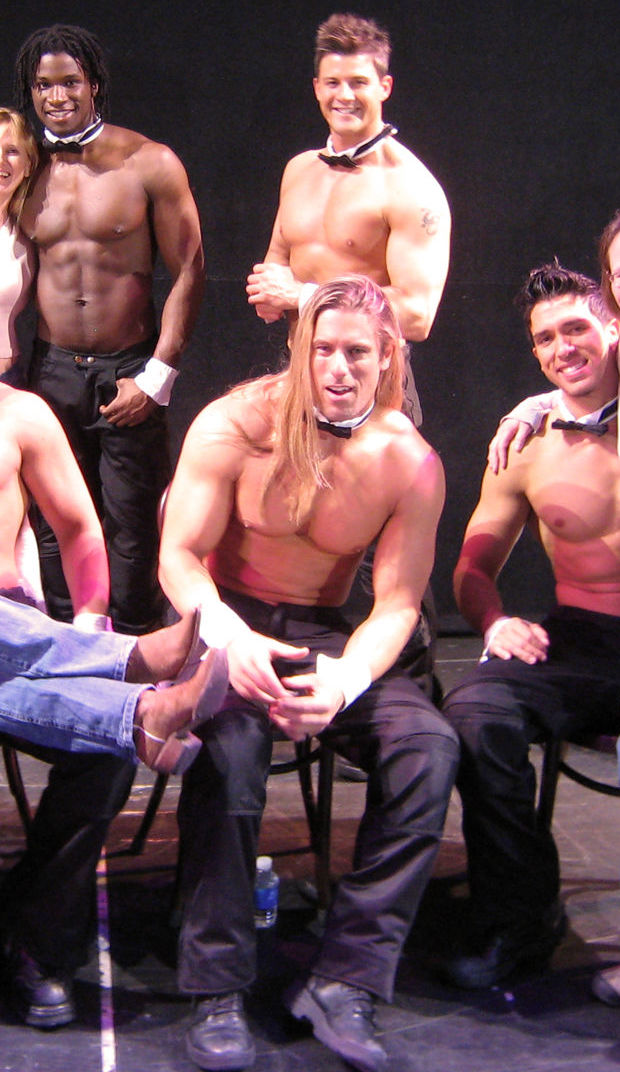
Farley and Swayze's costumes in the sketch mimic the ones worn by actual Chippendales dancers, including the distinctive bowties and wrist cuffs shown here.

The sketch opens on an establishing shot of the exterior of a Chippendales nightclub, dissolving to a panel of three judges played by Jan Hooks, Kevin Nealon, and Mike Myers. They have a discussion establishing that this is the final step of a long audition process, after which they must make the difficult decision of selecting one of two final candidates to hire as a Chippendales dancer.

A young woman (Victoria Jackson) ushers two dancers ("Barney", played by Chris Farley, and "Adrian", played by Patrick Swayze) on stage in front of the judges. The dancers are dressed in black trousers, sleeveless tuxedo shirts, bow ties, and wrist cuffs. The song "Working for the Weekend" by Loverboy begins to play, and the two begin dancing. Early in the routine, Adrian rips off his shirt, eliciting cheers from the audience. Barney then does the same thing, revealing his large belly, to laughter. Throughout the routine, the two men perform a number of high-energy moves, including leaps, spins, and sensual hip thrusting. At one point, Barney does "the worm" from a standing jump.

After the song ends, the two men exit the stage, and praise one another's performances backstage. They return to the stage, wearing robes, to receive the judges' decision. The judges state that they have chosen Adrian. Nealon's character explains that, while Barney's dancing was excellent, Adrian's body is "much, much better" than Barney's, which is "fat and flabby". Adrian affirms that Barney is a more skilled and sexy dancer, and that, if the judges chose him over Barney, it could only be because Barney's body is "so bad". As the judges continue to explain their decision, the camera slowly zooms in on Adrian's face, and the audio fades out and is replaced by a voiceover, with Adrian seeming to reflect retrospectively on his memory of this moment, and the impact that Barney had on him.

== Production ==
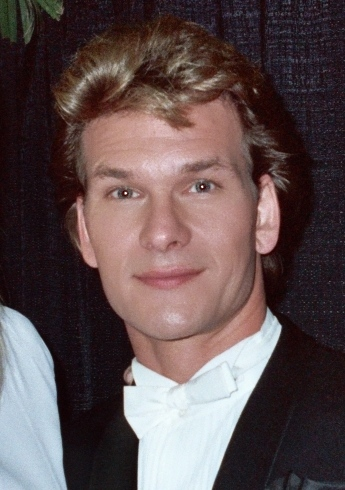
Patrick Swayze in 1990. The writing of the Chippendales sketch was partly inspired by Swayze's good looks and dancing ability.

The sketch was written by SNL writer Jim Downey. Downey stated that the sketch was mostly inspired by guest host Patrick Swayze, who was known for his attractive physique and dancing skill (as demonstrated, for example, in his breakout role in the 1987 film Dirty Dancing). Downey emphasized to Farley that, for the latter half of the sketch to succeed, his character needed to be unfazed by the criticism given by Nealon's character. He remembered his advice to Farley as being:

You're not at all embarrassed here. They're telling you, "Our audience tends to prefer a more sculpted, lean physique as opposed to a fat, flabby one," but your feelings are never hurt. You're processing that like it's good information. Like you're going to learn from this and take it to your next audition.

In the 2015 documentary I Am Chris Farley, comedian Tom Arnold recalled that, in the days leading up to the Swayze show, Farley had confided that he had reservations about doing the sketch, fearing the embarrassment of playing "the fat guy".

The version of the sketch shown in rebroadcasts is similar to the version which aired on the live broadcast, but the dancing sequence is taken from the filmed dress rehearsal.

== Impact ==
"Chippendales Audition" was the first SNL sketch to feature Farley in a starring role, and the episode in which it aired was only Farley's fourth as a cast member. Other cast members have identified the sketch as a pivotal moment in Farley's career on SNL, with its extremely positive audience reception establishing him as a standout cast member, and leading to his being frequently cast in prominent roles in future sketches that season. According to Farley's agent, Doug Robinson, a video of the Chippendales sketch was what led to him being signed by the talent agency CAA.

== Criticism and analysis ==
SNL writers and cast members have expressed sharply divided opinions about the Chippendales sketch.

Critics of the sketch have taken issue with its exploitation of Farley's obesity for humor, and the effect that such jokes had on Farley's mental health. Farley often used his weight for comedic effect – for example, The Washington Post's obituary for Farley noted his propensity for playing "comically sweaty, tightly wound characters who worked themselves and their girth into a frenzy". But friends and biographers have stated that, privately, Farley was insecure about his weight, and ambivalent about what he termed the "Fatty falls down" trope. Some contend that this fed into the addictions that would ultimately lead to his early death.

In interviews for the 2008 Farley biography The Chris Farley Show, writer Bob Odenkirk and cast member Chris Rock both stated that they "hate" the Chippendales sketch. Odenkirk described it as "fucking lame, weak bullshit", and expressed regret at it being Farley's breakout role, a view which he later reiterated in his 2022 memoir. Rock described the sketch as "mean", and complained that, after getting laughs from Farley's shirtless dancing, the sketch lacks any further "comic twist". In an interview with Howard Stern, Rock suggested that an ending in which the casting director selected Farley over Swayze would have maintained the sketch's humor without hurting Farley's feelings.

The author of the sketch, Jim Downey, and writers Robert Smigel and Al Franken have all defended it against such criticisms, with Smigel and Franken ranking it as one of the funniest sketches in the show's history. Downey and Smigel argue that the sketch goes beyond the mere "cheap" gag of laughing at Farley's shirtless dancing, by having all the characters consider Farley as a serious contender, with the judges earnestly taking down notes during the performance, and Nealon's judge stating multiple times how difficult it is to choose between Farley and Swayze's characters. The sketch's proponents also point to Farley's nimble, skillful dancing as an element which renders the sketch "empowering" rather than degrading. Kevin Nealon, who played a judge in the sketch, cited it as the most memorable sketch of his career, praising Farley's commitment, and noting his own difficulty in keeping a straight face.
