= Temperature Rising =

Temperature Rising may refer to:

- Temperature Rising (album), a 2006 album by Tata Young
- Temperature's Rising, an album by Loverboy
- "Temperature's Rising" (song), a 1995 song by Mobb Deep from The Infamous
- Temperatures Rising, an American television situation comedy
