= Goodbye Angel =

Goodbye Angel may refer to:

== Music ==
- "Goodbye Angel", a song by Fleetwood Mac from 25 Years – The Chain
- "Goodbye Angel", a song by Loverboy from Six (Loverboy album)
- "Goodbye Angel", a song by Red Hot Chili Peppers from The Getaway
