= Sinnaeve =

Sinnaeve is a surname. Notable people with the surname include:

- Bob Sinnaeve (born 1949), Canadian darts player
- Ken Sinnaeve (born 1955), Canadian musician
