= This Could Be the Night (Loverboy song) =

Single by Loverboy

from the album Lovin' Every Minute of It
- B-side: "It's Your Life"
- Released: January 1986
- Genre: Pop rock
- Length: 4:14
- Label: Columbia
- Songwriters: Paul Dean; Bill Wray; Jonathan Cain; Mike Reno
- Producers: Bruce Fairbairn; Paul Dean

Loverboy singles chronology
"Dangerous" (1985)	"This Could Be the Night" (1986)	"Lead a Double Life" (1986)

"This Could Be the Night" is a song written by Paul Dean, Mike Reno, Bill Wray and Jonathan Cain, and recorded by the Canadian rock band Loverboy from their hit album, Lovin' Every Minute of It, released in 1985. The song contained much more of a style that represented 1980s power ballads than the rocking style for which the band had been known. Released as a single in 1986 with an accompanying black-and-white music video, it reached the top ten on the Billboard Hot 100 singles chart.

Cash Box said that the "melodic, big-beat production features soaring guitars and string orchestration." Billboard called it a "stately power ballad."

== Charts ==
Chart (1985–86)	Peak position
Australia (Kent Music Report)	88
US Billboard Hot 100	10
US Album Rock Tracks (Billboard)	9
