= Lovin' Every Minute of It (song) =

Single by Loverboy

from the album Lovin' Every Minute of It
- B-side: "Bullet in the Chamber"
- Released: August 1985
- Recorded: 1985
- Genre: Hard rock
- Length: 3:32
- Label: Columbia
- Songwriter(s): Robert John "Mutt" Lange
- Producer(s): Tom Allom; Paul Dean

Loverboy singles chronology
"Queen of the Broken Hearts" (1983)	"Lovin' Every Minute of It" (1985)	"Dangerous" (1985)

"Lovin' Every Minute of It" is a song released in 1985 on the Canadian rock band Loverboy's album of the same title. The song reached #9 on the U.S. Billboard Hot 100 becoming their first US Top 10 hit, when released as a single later that year. It was written by Robert John "Mutt" Lange. In Canada, the song peaked at #11.

== Background ==
Loverboy were almost done writing songs for their upcoming album, but they felt they needed one more song — preferably a big hit — to round out the record. However, everyone in the band was out of ideas. They begged their then-producer, Mike Shipley, to find someone who could write one more song. Shipley called legendary producer Mutt Lange, who agreed and wrote "Lovin' Every Minute of It" in two or three days (or wrote it the same night as initially reported). However, Lange was in England while Loverboy were in Canada, and the band needed to know how the song sounded. Singer Mike Reno said,

There were no cellphones and there was no way to get the stuff here. There was no magic email — that wasn’t even created yet. So what happened was that he held the phone up to the speakers, played the song from England and we recorded it from the telephone line by holding a little recorder up to the phone. We said 'thanks,' and then we hung up and we proceeded to pick this song apart and give it our best try from what we picked up off the phone. A lot of it probably wasn’t very well heard, so we had to make a lot of it up. That was kind of an interesting way of doing things, right?

== Charts ==
Chart (1985–86)	Peak position
Australia (Kent Music Report)	77
Canada RPM Top Singles	11
US Billboard Hot 100	9
US Album Rock Tracks (Billboard)	3
