= This Could Be the Night =

This Could Be the Night may refer to:

- "This Could Be the Night" (1966 song), a 1966 song written by Harry Nilsson and Phil Spector
- "This Could Be the Night" (Loverboy song), a 1986 song by Loverboy
- This Could Be the Night (film), a 1957 film directed by Robert Wise
