= Rita Johns =

Canadian pop and rhythm and blues singer

Rita Johns is a Canadian pop and rhythm and blues singer. She is most noted for receiving a Juno Award nomination for Most Promising Female Vocalist at the Juno Awards of 1982.

Rita Johns first was discovered singing in church at St Rose of Lima church at 15 years old in Scarborough Ontario Canada in 1964

First discovered in 1969 while performing with a church choir in Scarborough, Toronto she performed in the Toronto area and recorded a number of singles before releasing her studio album One Woman Show in 1981. She followed up with the non-album singles "She's in Love With Her Radio" in 1982 and "Haunted by Love" in 1987, and cowrote the song "Cover Girl (Cache ton cœur)" for Véronique Béliveau, but did not record another full album before taking a break from the music business in 1986 to raise her children. She independently released a second album, Still Your Lady, in 1994.

In 2005, she performed at Roy Thomson Hall as part of the annual RBC Seniors Jubilee.
