= Live, Loud and Loose =

Live, Loud, and Loose

Live album by Loverboy
- Released: June 19, 2001
- Recorded: May 1, 1982 – February 27, 1986
- Genre: Rock
- Length: 73:39
- Labels: Sony Music, Columbia
- Producer: Paul Dean

Loverboy chronology
Six (1997)	Live, Loud, and Loose (2001)	Just Getting Started (2007)

Professional ratings
Review scores
Source	Rating
AllMusic	3/5 stars
Rolling Stone	(mixed)

Live, Loud and Loose (1982–1986) is an album released by the rock band Loverboy in 2001. After the death of their original bassist Scott Smith, the band decided to release a live album. This album contains refurbished recorded live tracks from the band's intense touring from 1982 to 1986. It became quite popular with fans, but failed to break into the mainstream.

The compilation was produced by Matt Frenette, with the overall album being produced by Paul Dean.

== Track listing ==
No.	Title	Writer(s)	Length
1.	"Working for the Weekend"	Dean; Frenette; Reno	3:57
2.	"Lucky Ones"	Dean; Reno; Smith; Thurlow	4:02
3.	"Lady of the 80's"	Dean; Johnson; Reno; Wills	6:10
4.	"Take Me to the Top"	Dean; Johnson; Reno	7:18
5.	"Jump"	Adams; Dean; Frenette; Reno; Vallance	4:22
6.	"This Could Be the Night"	Cain; Dean; Reno; Wray	5:18
7.	"Dangerous"	Adams; Vallance	3:50
8.	"Lead a Double Life"	Dean; Johnson; Johnson; Reno; Sigerson; Wray	4:28
9.	"When It's Over"	Dean; Reno	5:29
10.	"Queen of the Broken Hearts"	Dean; Reno	5:33
11.	"Lovin' Every Minute of it"	Dean; Fairbairn	5:02
12.	"Hot Girls in Love"	Dean; Fairbairn	6:33
13.	"Turn Me Loose"	Dean; Reno	6:04
14.	"The Kid is Hot Tonite"	Aubin; Dean	5:24

== Personnel ==
- Mike Reno – lead vocals
- Paul Dean – guitar, backing vocals
- Doug Johnson – keyboards
- Scott Smith – bass, backing vocals
- Matt Frenette – drums

Production

- Paul Dean – producer
- Matt Frenette – compilation producer
- Guy Charbonneau – engineer
- Biff Dawes – engineer
- Lynn Goldsmith – cover photo
- Mark Wilder – mastering
- Patrick Glover – assistant
- Al Quaglieri – compilation producer
- Howard Fritzson – art direction
- Steve Newman – design
- Craig Waddell – mastering
- Dianne Spoto Shattuck – packaging manager
