= Mae Moore =

Canadian singer

- Origin: Brandon, Manitoba, Canada
- Genres: Folk; jazz; pop
- Occupations: Singer; songwriter
- Instruments: Vocals; guitar
- Years active: 1985–present
- Labels: CBS Canada; Epic

Mae Moore is a Canadian singer-songwriter. Her music is a blend of pop, folk and jazz. Her most successful album, 1992's Bohemia, was an international hit, although her other albums have been successful mainly in Canada. Over the course of her career, Moore achieved nine top 40 singles in Canada, as well as two JUNO nominations, two Canadian Folk Music Awards nominations, and won two SOCAN Awards. Moore's second album, Bohemia, drew critical acclaim and was released internationally. Her biggest hit, "Genuine", became a top 10 hit in June 1995 and was one of Canada's ten most-performed compositions of the year.

== Early life ==
Moore was born in 1956 in Brandon, Manitoba, living there until the age of eight. Her family moved several times in the 1960s, and Moore lived for two years in White Rock, BC, then two years in Toronto, followed by several years in southern Ontario, in and around London. Moore's father was jazz trumpeter Tom "Dinty" Moore; Moore's mother died when Moore was 17. Moore studied art in Ottawa for a time, lived in Halifax for about a year, and then in 1979, moved with her family to Vancouver.

In and around the Vancouver area, Moore sang and wrote music with various local bands. Her first hit came by co-writing the song "Heaven in Your Eyes" (with John Dexter), which would later be recorded by Loverboy for the Top Gun soundtrack in 1986. She then worked with Barney Bentall and Colin Nairne from the band Barney Bentall and the Legendary Hearts, providing background vocals on their self-titled 1988 album Barney Bentall and the Legendary Hearts. She sang background vocals on and appeared in the music video for the Legendary Heart's "She's My Inspiration" song from that album. Her association with Bentall and Nairne paid off, as CBS Records in Canada soon awarded her a recording contract.

== Career ==
=== 1990–1994: Early studio albums ===
Moore's debut album, Oceanview Motel, arrived in 1990. It was produced by Bentall and Nairne, and featured Vancouver-area musicians from both Barney Bentall & the Legendary Hearts and Spirit of the West. Three singles were released, including "I'll Watch Over You" and "Red Clay Hills", which ranked among the top Adult Contemporary hits of 1990 and 1991, respectively, in Canada. The following year, Moore was nominated for a Juno Award for "Most Promising Female Vocalist".

In 1991, Moore traveled to Australia to write tracks for what would become her second album, Bohemia. She collaborated with Steve Kilbey, the lead singer from the Australian band The Church, and the resulting recordings featured a more atmospheric sound than her first album. Although Kilbey was the album's initial producer, his ongoing drug addiction resulted in producer Gavin MacKillop being asked to complete the record. Bohemia was released in Canada in October 1992 and met with critical acclaim. The album, released as her United States debut in August 1993, experienced some success in that country as well. It was released internationally in Australia, New Zealand, Germany, the UK, and Asia in early 1994.

The title track, which The Washington Post described as "a softly intoned rap song", was released as a single and reached number 26 in Canada in November 1992. The single gained popularity on US modern rock stations, peaking at number 25 on the Modern Rock chart in 1994. The music video was nominated for a Juno award in 1993. Further Bohemia singles "Because of Love" and "Coat of Shame" ranked at numbers 87 and 91, respectively, in the RPM year-end chart for 1993.

=== 1995–1996: Final CBS years and "Genuine" ===
Moore's third and final studio album for CBS was 1995's Dragonfly, again produced by MacKillop. The album adopted a less urban style than on Bohemia, which Moore explained to Billboard by commenting that "I tend to celebrate a bit more. I'm happier as a person than I was maybe a couple of years ago", although the album discussed topics including a near-death experience. The album debuted on the RPM albums chart at number 89 on the chart dated May 29, 1995, reaching number 63 on the chart dated June 11.

Dragonfly featured her most successful single to date, "Genuine", a song which Billboard writer Craig Rosen deemed "funkier" than her work on Bohemia, and which features an MC break near the end. The single debuted on the RPM100 on May 8, 1995, It reached number 8 on the RPM "Top 100" singles chart in Canada dated July 3, 1995. It further peaked within the top 5 of the RPM Adult Contemporary chart. In the issue of Radio & Record dated August 11, Genuine was ranked number 3 on Canada's airplay chart. The accompanying music video, which was filmed in Toronto in April 1995, received play on MuchMusic beginning in May 1995. The single was planned to be sent to adult alternative and modern rock radio in the United States during the first week of April 1995.

Three songs on Dragonfly ranked among the biggest hits in Canada of 1995 and 1996. On the RPM "Top 100 Hit Tracks of 1995" chart, "Genuine" placed at number 68, while follow-up single "Watermark" placed at number 74. In that issue, both tracks also appeared on the year-end Adult Contemporary Tracks chart, with "Genuine" at number 42 and "Watermark" at number 79. In the year-end 1996 issue of RPM, Moore's "Love Won't Find Us Here" placed at number 92 on the Top 100 Adult Contemporary Tracks ranking. In November 1996, Moore received a SOCAN award for "Genuine", recognizing it as one of the previous year's ten most popular Canadian pop songs. Prior to her receiving the award, Moore was dropped by her label.

=== 1996–present: Independent recordings ===
After being dropped from CBS, Moore's friend, fellow Canadian singer Jann Arden, invited her to record for Arden's newly founded record label, Big Hip Records. Moore released her self-titled fourth studio album on the label in 1999. In 2002, she released her fifth studio album, It's a Funny World, which she recorded in her home studio. The album is a mix of new compositions and re-recordings of her old songs, including "Bohemia" and "Red Clay Hills".

In 2011, Moore released Folklore, an album accompanied by a coffee table book of her paintings. Produced by Joby Baker, it was nominated for two Canadian Folk Music Awards. Folklore is an ode to Canada, an exploration of friendship and for the first time features Moore on the Appalachian mountain dulcimer, an instrument that she has played since the mid-'70s. In fact, "Rain Song" was written in 1979 but never previously recorded. The record features Joby Baker (Cowboy Junkies, Alex Cuba), Rick May, Marc Atkinson, Daniel Lapp and Scott Sheerin.

== Personal life ==
In 2002, Moore launched an occasional performing collaboration with folk musician Lester Quitzau. Moore and Quitzau subsequently married. Together they released an album in 2004 entitled Oh My!. In 2005, they appeared in their own Bravo TV documentary, Mae Moore and Lester Quitzau: In Their Own Backyard.

== Discography ==
=== Albums ===
List of albums, with selected peak chart positions
Release date	Title	Chart positions
Release date	Title	Canada RPM Albums Chart
September 1990	Oceanview Motel	—
October 1992	Bohemia	66
May 1995	Dragonfly	63
June 1999	Mae Moore	—
2000	Collected Works 1989–1999 (greatest hits compilation)	—
April 2000	It's a Funny World	—
January 2004	Oh My! (with Lester Quitzau)	—
February 2011	Folklore	—

=== Singles ===
List of singles, with selected peak chart positions
Release date	Title	Chart positions	Album
Release date	Title	Canada RPM Top 100	Album
August 1990	"I'll Watch Over You"	16	Oceanview Motel
November 1990	"Where Loneliness Lives"	30	Oceanview Motel
March 1991	"Red Clay Hills"	23	Oceanview Motel
October 1992	"Bohemia"	26	Bohemia
January 1993	"Because of Love"	12	Bohemia
May 1993	"Coat of Shame"	11	Bohemia
September 1993	"The Wish"	50	Bohemia
May 1995	"Genuine"	8	Dragonfly
September 1995	"Watermark"	29	Dragonfly
February 1996	"Love Won't Find Us Here"	18	Dragonfly
May 1999	"Free to Love Me (Warm Song)"	—	Mae Moore
