= Just Getting Started (Loverboy album) =

Studio album by Loverboy
- Released: November 27, 2007
- Genre: Hard rock, pop rock, power pop
- Length: 37:10
- Label: RockStar Records/eOne Entertainment Canada
- Producer: Dane DeViller, Sean Hosein, Steve Smith, Anthony Anderson

Loverboy chronology
Live, Loud and Loose (2001)	Just Getting Started (2007)	Rock 'n' Roll Revival (2012)

Professional ratings
Review scores
Source	Rating
AllMusic	4/5 stars

Just Getting Started is the seventh studio album by the Canadian rock band Loverboy, released in 2007. It was their first album of original material since 1997, and their first album to feature bassist Ken Sinnaeve.

For fans who purchased the album on CD, a bonus song download and booklet were offered on Rockstar Records' official website.

== Track listing ==
Just Getting Started track listing
No.	Title	Writer(s)	Length
1.	"Just Getting Started"	Mike Reno, Anthony Anderson, Dane DeViller, Adam Hursfield, Sean Hosein, Steve Smith	3:25
2.	"Fade to Black"	Reno, Anderson, DeViller, Hursfield, Hosein, Smith	3:34
3.	"One of Them Days"	Reno, DeViller, Hosein, Hursfield, Paul Dean	3:27
4.	"Back for More"	Steve Kipner, DeViller, Hosein	3:49
5.	"Lost With You"	Reno, Anderson, DeViller, Hursfield, Hosein, Smith	3:40
6.	"I Would Die for You"	Reno, Anderson, DeViller, Hursfield, Hosein, Smith	3:59
7.	"The Real Thing"	Reno, Haydain Neale, Davor Vulama	3:52
8.	"The One that Got Away"	Reno, DeViller, Hursfield, Hosein	3:51
9.	"As Good as it Gets"	Reno, Hursfield, Vulama	3:47
10.	"Stranded"	Reno, Anderson, DeViller, Hursfield, Hosein, Smith	3:46
Total length:			37:10

== Personnel ==
Loverboy

- Mike Reno -– lead vocals
- Paul Dean – guitar, backing vocals
- Doug Johnson – keyboards
- Ken Sinnaeve – bass
- Matt Frenette – drums

Additional personnel

- Phil Collen – backing vocals on "Stranded"
