= John Stark (actor) =

Canadian stage actor

John Starcevic, known by the stage name John Stark, is a Canadian stage actor and producer most noted for his long-running one-man show which he performed in character as writer Stephen Leacock. Originally from Rossland, British Columbia, he is an alumnus of Simon Fraser University, He began performing as Leacock in the 1970s, and toured the show extensively throughout Canada, the United States and the United Kingdom. His show was also filmed for broadcast by CBC Television and PBS; his performance at the National Arts Centre was recorded for release on Tapestry Records in 1981, and received a Juno Award nomination for Comedy Album of the Year at the Juno Awards of 1982.

In the 1980s, Stark moved into film production, trying for over ten years to produce a historical drama film about the Doukhobors. His other film projects included a television film of Leacock's Sunshine Sketches of a Little Town, and the theatrical films Chekhov and Maria and A Play on Words. He has also continued to produce and direct in theatre; he most commonly stages the plays of playwright Jovanka Bach, who was his wife for 28 years until her death in 2006, but has also created the original autobiographical show Me Myself And I, by Himself.
