= Working for the Weekend =

1981 song by Loverboy

Single by Loverboy

from the album Get Lucky
- B-side: "Emotional"
- Released: September 1981
- Studio: Mushroom (Vancouver, British Columbia)
- Genre: Hard rock; pop rock
- Length: 3:41
- Label: CBS
- Songwriters: Paul Dean; Matt Frenette; Mike Reno
- Producers: Bruce Fairbairn; Paul Dean

Loverboy singles chronology
"The Kid Is Hot Tonite" (1981)	"Working for the Weekend" (1981)	"When It's Over" (1981)

Music video
- "Working for the Weekend" on YouTube

"Working for the Weekend" is a song by Canadian rock band Loverboy from their second studio album, Get Lucky (1981). It was written by guitarist Paul Dean, vocalist Mike Reno, and drummer Matt Frenette and produced by Bruce Fairbairn and Dean. The song was released as the lead single from the album in 1981 and reached number 29 on the US Billboard Hot 100 chart, as well as number two on Billboard's Rock Top Tracks chart in February 1982. "Working for the Weekend" was ranked at number 100 on VH1's "100 Greatest Songs of the 80s".

== Background ==
The song originated when guitarist Paul Dean was out walking one Wednesday afternoon, looking for inspiration in his songwriting. He noticed that much of the area was deserted, as most people were at work. "So I'm out on the beach and wondering, 'Where is everybody? Well, I guess they're all waiting for the weekend,'" he later said. Mike Reno, the band's vocalist, suggested they change the title to "Working for the Weekend". According to Dean, he first began writing the song in a hotel room following a Montreal concert. At the time, the band were still playing bars to little response from patrons. After completing the song, they used it to open one set, and Dean recalled that "the dance floor was packed".

== Personnel ==
- Mike Reno – lead vocals
- Paul Dean – guitar, backing vocals
- Doug Johnson – keyboards
- Scott Smith – bass
- Matt Frenette – drums

== Charts ==
=== Weekly charts ===
Chart (1981–1982)	Peak position
Australia (Kent Music Report)	19
Canada Top Singles (RPM)	10
New Zealand (Recorded Music NZ)	19
US Billboard Hot 100	29
US Rock Top Tracks (Billboard)	2

=== Year-end charts ===
Chart (1982)	Rank
Australia (Kent Music Report)	93
US Billboard Hot 100	96

== Certifications ==
Region	Certification	Certified units/sales
Canada (Music Canada)	2× Platinum	160,000^{‡}
^{‡} Sales+streaming figures based on certification alone.

== Cover versions ==
- The song was covered by former American Idol contestant and country music singer Josh Gracin on the soundtrack to the 2005 film Herbie: Fully Loaded, starring Lindsay Lohan and Justin Long, in the scene where the team works to fix Herbie overnight in time for the final race.
- American virtuoso guitarist Paul Gilbert included an instrumental cover of this song as the first track on his 2014 album Stone Pushing Uphill Man.
- Ron Burgundy (Will Ferrell) performed a parody version of the song on Conan on November 20, 2013, suggesting he had been asked by Rob Ford to cover the song as Ford's campaign song for re-election as Mayor of Toronto, the lyrics parodying Ford's substance abuse scandal.

== In popular culture ==
- The song was used in the Saturday Night Live sketch "Chippendales Audition" featuring Chris Farley and guest host Patrick Swayze. The sketch aired on October 27, 1990.
- The song made in appearance in the video game Grand Theft Auto: Vice City on the in-game hard rock and heavy metal radio station V-Rock.
- The song has appeared in the 2001 comedy film Zoolander in a scene where Derek Zoolander works in a coal mine with his family.
- The song appears as one of the main menu themes in the 2005 video game Namco Museum: 50th Anniversary.
- The song was briefly heard in the 2006 comedy film Click where a driver (Terry Crews) is seen singing the lyrics to Michael Newman (Adam Sandler).
- The song was featured in the Cartoon Network show Regular Show Season 1, Episode 3, Caffeinated Concert Tickets. It was featured during a montage scene.
- The song was referenced in the 2014 television series Selfie, specifically in episode 4, "Nugget of Wisdom," featuring Karen Gillan, John Cho, Brian Huskey, and Samm Levine.
- The song was used in the launch trailer for Chapter 6: Season 4 of Fortnite: Battle Royale, titled "Shock 'N Awesome".
- The song was used in the 2026 Pixar film Hoppers, during King George’s introduction.
- The song appears on Grand Theft Auto 6.
