= The Kid Is Hot Tonite =

Single by Loverboy

from the album Loverboy
- B-side: "Teenage Overdose"
- Released: June 20, 1981
- Genre: Rock; pop rock
- Length: 3:35
- Label: Columbia
- Songwriters: Paul Dean, Bernie Aubin
- Producer: Bruce Fairbairn

Loverboy singles chronology
"Turn Me Loose" (1980)	"The Kid Is Hot Tonite" (1981)	"Working for the Weekend" (1981)

"The Kid Is Hot Tonite" is a song by Canadian rock band Loverboy, released in 1981 as the second and final single from their self-titled debut album. The song is interpreted by some to be about up-and-coming fellow Canadian musician Bryan Adams. While not as big a chart success as their debut single "Turn Me Loose", the song still reached number 20 in Canada and number 55 in the United States.

AllMusic called it "a radio-ready rocker that slickly balances mid-tempo guitar riffs with surging synthesizer lines". Record World stated the song has "winning guitar/synthesizer strains and a smashing chorus hook."

== Charts ==
Chart (1981)	Peak position
Australia (Kent Music Report)	76
Canada Top Singles (RPM)	20
US Billboard Hot 100	55
US Billboard Top Rock Tracks	42
