= Unfinished Business (Loverboy album) =

Studio album by Loverboy
- Released: July 15, 2014
- Genre: Rock
- Length: 44:28
- Label: Loverboy Music

Loverboy chronology
| Rock 'n' Roll Revival (2012) | Unfinished Business (2014) |

Unfinished Business is the ninth studio album by Canadian rock band Loverboy. The album was released on July 15, 2014, through Loverboy Music.

== Track listing ==
Unfinished Business track listing
| No. | Title | Length |
|---|---|---|
| 1. | "Fire Me Up" | 3:45 |
| 2. | "Countin' the Nights" | 3:50 |
| 3. | "Ain't Such a Bad Thing" | 3:39 |
| 4. | "Come Undone" | 4:06 |
| 5. | "Slave" | 4:41 |
| 6. | "What Makes You So Special" | 4:03 |
| 7. | "War Bride" | 6:19 |
| 8. | "Doin' It the Hard Way" | 3:32 |
| 9. | "You Play the Star" | 4:38 |
| 10. | "Crack of the Whip" | 5:55 |
| Total length: | | 44:28 |

== Personnel ==
- Mike Reno – lead vocals
- Paul Dean – guitar, backing vocals, mixing
- Matt Frenette – drums
- Doug Johnson – keyboards
- Ken "Spider" Sinnaeve – bass guitar

Additional personnel

- Scott Smith – bass (posthumous)
- Aleen Hunnie – mastering
