= Wildside (album) =

Studio album by Loverboy
- Released: September 1987
- Studio: Little Mountain Sound Studios
- Genre: Rock
- Length: 48:43
- Label: Columbia
- Producer: Bruce Fairbairn

Loverboy chronology
Lovin' Every Minute of It (1985)	Wildside (1987)	Big Ones (1989)

Professional ratings
Review scores
Source	Rating
AllMusic	2/5 stars

Wildside is the fifth studio album by Canadian rock band Loverboy, released in September 1987. It was the band's first to not be certified platinum, signalling a decline in their popularity.

Cash Box cited the "driving rock melodies" of the single "Love Will Rise Again", which "continues in band's established tradition of melodic power-rock".

Of the album, Musician reviewer J. D. Considine wrote simply: "Take a walk."

== Track listing ==
Wildside track listing
No.	Title	Writer(s)	Length
1.	"Notorious"	Jon Bon Jovi, Todd Cerney, Dean, Reno, Richie Sambora	4:39
2.	"Walkin' on Fire"	Todd Cerney, Dean, Taylor Rhodes	4:17
3.	"Break It to Me Gently"	Dean, Reno	4:37
4.	"Love Will Rise Again"	Todd Cerney, Rhodes	4:29
5.	"Can't Get Much Better"	Todd Cerney, Paul Dean, Mike Perodeau, Rhodes, Steve Tracey	4:05
6.	"Hometown Hero"	Bryan Adams, Todd Cerney, Dean, Rhodes	4:12
7.	"Wildside"	Reno, Lindsay West, J.L. Douglas	3:31
8.	"Don't Let Go"	Brian MacLeod, Reno	3:36
9.	"That's Where My Money Goes"	Dean, Gerald O'Brien, Alfie Zappacosta	4:14
10.	"Read My Lips"	Doug Johnson, Reno, Neil Shilkin	5:03

CD bonus track
No.	Title	Writer(s)	Length
11.	"Don't Keep Me in the Dark"	James P. Dunne, Reno, Austin Roberts	5:56

== Personnel ==
All information from the album booklet.

Loverboy

- Mike Reno – lead vocals
- Paul Dean – guitar, backing vocals
- Doug Johnson – keyboards
- Scott Smith – bass
- Matt Frenette – drums, percussion

Additional musicians

- Darrell Mansfield – harp
- Alison Glass – voice on "That's Where My Money Goes"
- Paul Hyde – voice on "That's Where My Money Goes"

Production

- Neil Shilkin – programming
- Bruce Fairbairn – producer, backing vocals
- Bob Rock – engineer, mixing
- Mike Fraser – engineer
- Ed Thacker – mastering
- George Marino – mastering
- Norman Moore – art direction
- Phillip Dixon – photography
- James O' Mara – photography
- Ryan Begley – photography

== Charts ==
Chart (1987)	Peak position
Canada Top Albums/CDs (RPM)	21
US Billboard 200	42

== Certifications ==
Region	Certification	Certified units/sales
Canada (Music Canada)	Gold	50,000^{^}
United States (RIAA)	Gold	500,000^{^}
^{^} Shipments figures based on certification alone.
