= Ken Sinnaeve =

Canadian musician

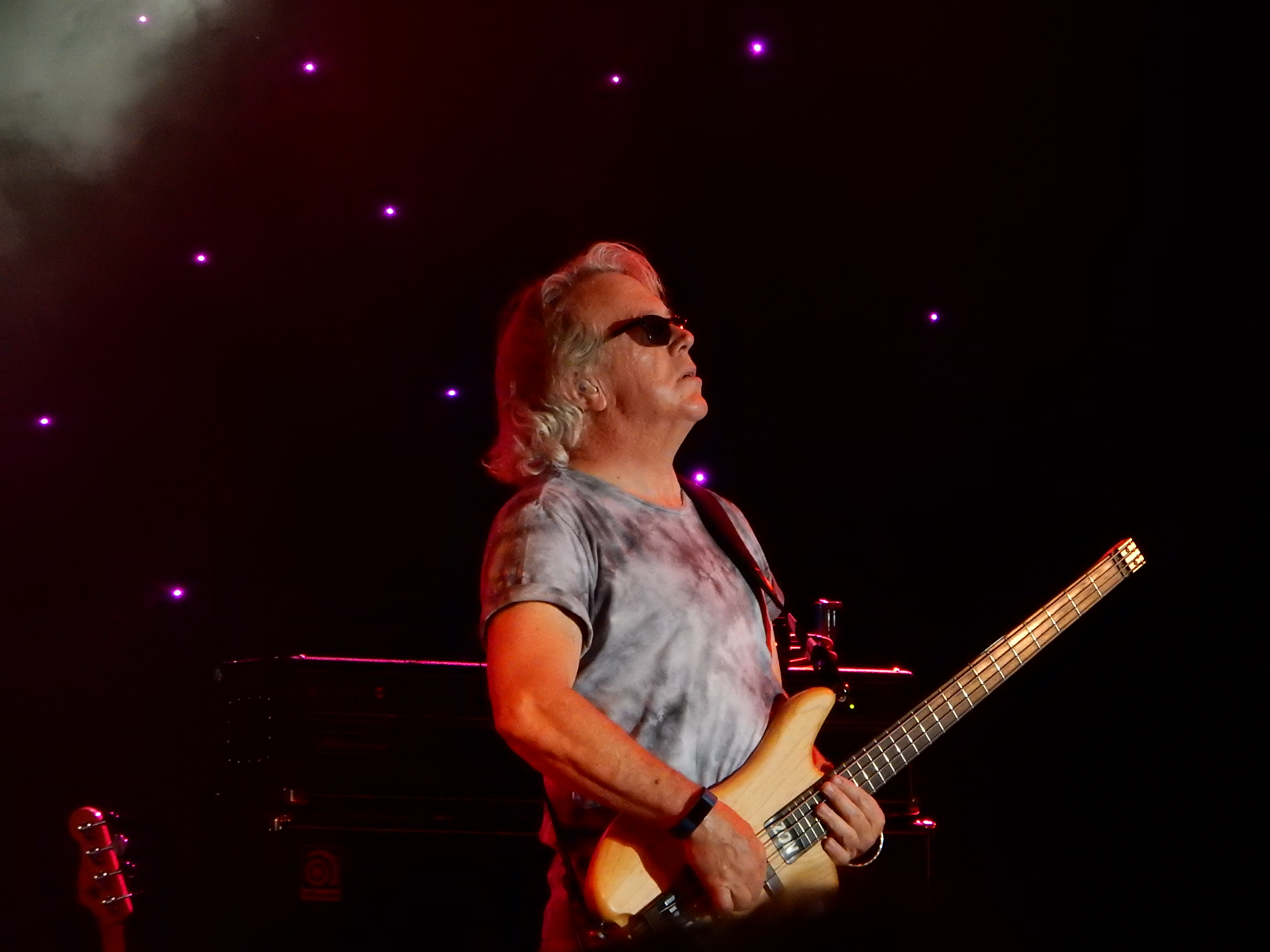
- Sinnaeve performing with Loverboy in 2018

Background information
- Also known as: Spider
- Born: Kenneth Sinnaeve; May 2, 1954 (age 71)
- Origin: Regina, Saskatchewan, Canada
- Genres: Rock
- Occupation: Musician
- Instrument: Bass guitar
- Website: kenspidersinnaeve.com

Kenneth "Spider" Sinnaeve (born May 2, 1954) is a Canadian musician. He was a founding member of the popular Canadian band Streetheart, and since 2001 has been a member of Loverboy, replacing late bassist Scott Smith. Sinnaeve has also contributed to many albums and played live performances with George McCrae, Helix, Tom Cochrane & Red Rider, Kim Mitchell, The Partland Brothers, Lee Aaron, and The Guess Who.

== Career ==
Sinnaeve and keyboardist Daryl Gutheil formed a band, Wascana, in Regina. The pair moved to Winnipeg and joined with Kenny Shields, calling themselves Witness. In 1976, the group became a full band, Streetheart, with the addition of guitarist Paul Dean and drummer Matt Frenette. Streetheart released a number of successful albums in the 1980s.

Streetheart's most popular single, their 1979 cover version of "Under My Thumb" by the Rolling Stones, achieved gold single status in Canada; the live version contains a blazing bass solo, performed by Sinnaeve.

After Streetheart broke up in 1983, Sinnaeve recorded with the Partland Brothers and also performed and recorded with Red Rider. in 1988, he toured in western Canada with former bandmate Kenny Shields.

Spider has been with Loverboy since 2000 and continues to perform with them as well as Streetheart. He has continued to play with this band for many years.

== Awards ==
Awards include two Juno Awards, an Ampex Golden Reel Award, and a Technics All Star Band award as bass player of the year. He has been inducted into the Western Canadian Music Hall of Fame twice, as well as the Juno Hall of Fame.

== Personal life ==
Sinnaeve has a wife, Barbara, a daughter Kaari and a son, Anders.

== Discography ==
=== with Streetheart ===
- Meanwhile Back in Paris... (1978)
- Under Heaven Over Hell (1979)
- Quicksand Shoes (1980)
- Drugstore Dancer (1980)
- Streetheart (1982)
- Dancing with Danger (1983)
- Buried Treasure (1984)

=== with Strange Advance ===
- 2WO (1985)

=== with Loverboy ===
- Just Getting Started (2007)
- Rock 'n' Roll Revival (2012)
- Unfinished Business (2014)
