= Dangerous (Loverboy song) =

"Dangerous" was a song released in 1985 on the highly successful album Lovin' Every Minute of It released by Loverboy. The song achieved minor success when released as a single during the same year, and reached #65 on the Billboard Hot 100.

The song was written by Bryan Adams and Jim Vallance, and was originally recorded by Adams, under the title "Reckless", for his hit 1984 album of the same name. However, it was ultimately left off the final track list. When Loverboy later used the song, they changed the title and chorus lyrics. The Bryan Adams' version eventually saw a release on the 30th anniversary reissue of Reckless.

Cash Box said that it "captures the raw energy of Loverboy with a killer chorus hook." Billboard called it an "oversized, megarock cruncher."

== Charts ==
Chart (1985–86)	Peak position
US Billboard Hot 100	65
US Album Rock Tracks (Billboard)	23
