= Six (Loverboy album) =

Studio album by Loverboy
- Released: December 4, 1997
- Studio: Machine Works (West Vancouver)
- Genre: Rock
- Length: 65:55
- Label: CMC International
- Producer: Paul Dean

Loverboy chronology
Temperature's Rising (1995)	Six (1997)	Live, Loud, and Loose (2001)

Six is the title of Loverboy's sixth studio album, released in 1997. It is the band's first album with new material since 1987, and their last album to feature the original lineup, as bassist Scott Smith died in a boating accident in 2000.

== Track listing ==
Six track listing
No.	Title	Writer(s)	Length
1.	"Big Picture"	Dean, Reno, Smith, Kevin McKenzie	6:19
2.	"Love of Money"	Dean, Reno	4:01
3.	"Secrets"	Dean, Reno, Alex Chuaqui	5:12
4.	"Waiting for the Night"	Dean, Reno	4:27
5.	"Nobody Cares"	Dean, Reno, Doug Johnson	5:29
6.	"Goodbye Angel"	David Steele, Kenny Geatros	4:36
7.	"Create a Monster"	Dean, Reno, Alex Chaqui	4:11
8.	"Hair of the Dog"	Dean, Reno, Smith, Frenette	4:33
9.	"Maybe Someday"	Dean, Kevin McKenzie	5:17
10.	"Spinnin' My Wheels"	Dean, Reno	4:47
11.	"So Much for Love"	Dean, Reno, Geraldo Dominelli, Gerry Doucette	3:58
12.	"Tortured"	Dean, Reno, Doug Johnson, Kevin McKenzie	6:01
Total length:			52:50

Japanese bonus track
No.	Title	Writer(s)	Length
13.	"Domino Effect"	Dean, Reno, Manny Carlton	4:13

== Personnel ==
All information from the album booklet.

Loverboy

- Mike Reno – lead vocals, producer
- Paul Dean – guitar, vocals, producer, recording, mixing
- Doug Johnson – keyboards on "Spinnin' My Wheels" and "Tortured"
- Scott Smith – bass, vocals
- Matt Frenette – drums

Additional musicians

- Norm Fisher – bass
- Eric Webster – keyboards on "So Much For Love"
- Richard Sera – keyboards, vocals

Production

- Paul Baker – engineering
- Marc Ramaer – engineering
- Craig Waddell – mastering
- Ralph Alfonso – design
- Annamaria DiSanto – photography
- George Lembesis – photography
