= When It's Over (Loverboy song) =

Single by Loverboy

from the album Get Lucky
- B-side: "It's Your Life"
- Released: 1982
- Genre: Rock
- Length: 5:08 (Album version): 3:56 (Single edit)
- Label: Columbia
- Songwriters: Paul Dean; Mike Reno

Loverboy singles chronology
"Working for the Weekend" (1981)	"When It's Over" (1982)	"Take Me to the Top" (1982)

"When It's Over" is a song by the Canadian rock band Loverboy from their album Get Lucky released in 1981. Written by band members Paul Dean and Mike Reno, it features Nancy Nash on background vocals. Relying heavily on synthesizers, the song became a Top 40 hit for the band when released as a single the following year, peaking at number 17 on Canada's RPM Top Singles in May and number 26 on the U.S. Billboard Hot 100 chart for two weeks in June 1982.

Billboard calls the song a "catchy midtempo rocker", while AllMusic's Donald A. Guarisco considers it a "moody power ballad" with Reno's "show-stoppingly emotional vocal performance".

== Charts ==
Chart (1982)	Peak position
US Billboard Hot 100	26
