= Scott Smith (musician) =

Canadian musician (1955–2000)

- Born: Donald Scott Smith; 13 February 1955; Winnipeg, Manitoba, Canada
- Died: 30 November 2000 (aged 45) Off the coast of San Francisco
- Genres: Rock, hard rock
- Occupation: Musician
- Instrument: Bass guitar
- Disappeared: November 30, 2000 (aged 45); Off the coast of San Francisco
- Status: Declared dead in absentia

Donald Scott Smith (born 13 February 1955 – disappeared 30 November 2000) was a Canadian musician and the bassist for Canadian rock band Loverboy, a band that sold millions of records and scored several hit songs in the 1980s before a break up and reunion in the 1990s.

Smith disappeared after a large wave swept him off a pleasure boat near San Francisco, California. He was never seen again, and later presumed dead.

== Early life ==
Smith was born in Winnipeg, Manitoba. He originally studied guitar, and at the age of twelve moved to bass.

== Career ==
During his studies at the University of Manitoba, Smith received a call inviting him to play bass for the Canadian rock band Loverboy. In addition to playing bass for the band, Smith also co-wrote a few of the band's songs including the 1983 rock hit "Lucky Ones".

After Loverboy disbanded in 1988, Smith was part of the band Dangerous along with Mike Reno and Brian MacLeod. He also worked as a late-night radio DJ at CFOX, albeit briefly. Loverboy got back together for a benefit concert in 1991 then reunited in 1993 and continued touring through the 1990s. Smith said in an interview, "We're back because we like to rock and simply because promoters want to book us."

Bob Rock used Scott Smith's Spector NS1 bass on Metallica's eighth studio album, St. Anger.

Smith played the bass on six Loverboy albums, and featured posthumously on the 7th album released in 2014.

== Death ==
On 30 November 2000, Smith was sailing his boat, the 11-metre (36-foot) Sea Major, with two friends off the coast of San Francisco near the Golden Gate Bridge when a large wave swept him overboard. Searches conducted by the Coast Guard and a private company hired by friends and family were unsuccessful. Smith was pronounced missing and presumed dead, lost at sea.

== Personal life ==
Smith lived in Maple Ridge, British Columbia and had two sons.

== Discography ==
=== with Loverboy ===
- Loverboy (1980)
- Get Lucky (1981)
- Keep It Up (1983)
- Lovin' Every Minute of It (1985)
- Wildside (1987)
- Six (1997)
- Unfinished Business (2014, posthumous)

=== Soundtrack appearances ===
| Title | Release | With | Soundtrack |
|---|---|---|---|
| "Dangerous" | 1984 | Loverboy | Metropolis |
| "Heaven in Your Eyes" | 1986 | Loverboy | Top Gun |

== See also ==
- List of people who disappeared mysteriously at sea
