= Loverboy (Loverboy album) =

- Barbara Astman self portrait based on the Untitled, I was Thinking About You series of art works.

Studio album by Loverboy
- Released: July 1980/November 1, 1980 (US)
- Recorded: 1979–Spring 1980
- Studio: Little Mountain Sound (Vancouver)
- Genres: Pop rock; arena rock; hard rock; new wave
- Length: 40:13
- Label: Columbia
- Producer: Bruce Fairbairn

Loverboy chronology
Loverboy (1980)	Get Lucky (1981)

Singles from Loverboy
- 1. "Turn Me Loose" Released: February 7, 1981; 2. "The Kid Is Hot Tonite" Released: June 20, 1981; 3. "Lady of the 80's" Released: 1981

Loverboy is the debut studio album by Canadian rock band Loverboy. It was released in July 1980 by CBS Records Canada and Columbia Records in the United States the following November.

== Release ==
Originally rejected by all the major record labels in the United States, the band signed with CBS Records Canada. On March 20, 1980, Loverboy went into the studio with producer Bruce Fairbairn and engineer Bob Rock to record their debut.

Over that summer, Loverboy became a huge hit, eventually selling over a million records in Canada. Its success convinced Columbia Records to release it in the United States that November. It went on to sell over two million copies in the US. Their debut single, "Turn Me Loose", went on to hit No. 7 on the Canadian charts and No. 35 on the US Billboard Hot 100 in early 1981. Follow up single "The Kid Is Hot Tonite" reached number 20 in Canada and number 55 in the United States.

== Critical reception ==
Professional ratings
Review scores
Source	Rating
AllMusic	4.5/5 stars
Billboard	(unrated)

Linda Romaniak of the Beaver County Times compared Loverboy to The Cars and The Babys, calling "Turn Me Loose" and "Teenage Overdose" rocking tunes, while also praising "The Kid Is Hot Tonite" and "Lady of the 80's". AllMusic gave the album a rave retrospective review, making particular note of the hybridization of musical styles on most of the songs, and picking out "The Kid Is Hot Tonite" and "Turn Me Loose" as especially strong tracks. Record World stated that "The Kid is Hot Tonite" had "winning guitar/synthesizer strains and a smashing chorus hook."

== Artwork ==
Fellow Canadian photographer Barbara Astman was commissioned to create the album cover, and was sent a copy along with lyrics. She created the cover by typing the lyrics to "Little Girl" onto a self-portrait Polaroid as it developed. It is based on her Untitled, I was Thinking About You series of photos.

== Track listing ==
No.	Title	Writer(s)	Length
1.	"The Kid Is Hot Tonite"	Bernie Aubin, Paul Dean	4:24
2.	"Turn Me Loose"	Dean, Mike Reno	5:35
3.	"Always On My Mind"	Dean, Reno	3:31
4.	"Lady of the 80's"	Dean, Reno, Doug Johnson, Vernon Wills	5:05
5.	"Little Girl"	Dean	3:55
6.	"Prissy Prissy"	Dean, Matt Frenette	4:21
7.	"Teenage Overdose"	Dean, Johnson, Reno	4:14
8.	"D.O.A."	Dean, Johnson, Reno	3:38
9.	"It Don't Matter"	Dean, Reno	4:56
Total length:			39:39

== Personnel ==
Loverboy

- Mike Reno – lead vocals
- Paul Dean – guitar, backing vocals
- Doug Johnson – keyboards
- Scott Smith – bass
- Matt Frenette – drums

Additional musicians

- Wayne Kozak – saxophone
- Nancy Nash – backing vocals on "Turn Me Loose" and "Always On My Mind"

Production

- Bruce Fairbairn – producer
- Bob Rock – engineer
- Mike Fraser – assistant engineer

== Charts ==
Chart (1980–1981)	Peak position
Australian Albums (Kent Music Report)	5
Canada Top Albums/CDs (RPM)	17
New Zealand Albums (RMNZ)	12
US Billboard 200	13

== Certifications ==
Region	Certification	Certified units/sales
Canada (Music Canada)	7× Platinum	700,000^{‡}
United States (RIAA)	2× Platinum	2,000,000^{^}
^{^} Shipments figures based on certification alone.^{‡} Sales+streaming figures based on certification alone.
