= Lovin' Every Minute of It =

Studio album by Loverboy
- Released: August 1985
- Studios: Little Mountain Sound Studios (Vancouver, British Columbia)
- Genres: Arena rock, pop rock
- Length: 38:19
- Label: Columbia
- Producers: Tom Allom and Paul Dean

Loverboy chronology
Keep It Up (1983)	Lovin' Every Minute of It (1985)	Wildside (1987)

Singles from Lovin' Every Minute of It
- 1. "Lovin' Every Minute of It" Released: 1985; 2. "Dangerous" Released: 1985; 3. "This Could Be the Night" Released: 1986; 4. "Lead a Double Life" Released: 1986

Professional ratings
Review scores
Source	Rating
AllMusic	2/5 stars
Kerrang!	3.5/5 stars

Lovin' Every Minute of It is the fourth studio album, released in 1985 by the rock band Loverboy. The album became a hit thanks to the title track which reached #9 at US Billboard Hot 100, while "This Could Be the Night" peaked at #10, "Dangerous" #65 and "Lead a Double Life" #68. The album went double platinum, being the last of the band's to do so.

Due to scheduling conflicts this is the first album the band did not use Bruce Fairbairn as their producer. In October 1984, they did sessions with Mike Shipley producing at Le Studio in Morin Heights, but were dissatisfied with the results so the recordings were scrapped. Tom Allom was eventually hired as a replacement.

Cash Box said of the single "Lead a Double Life" that "Loverboy’s trademark straightforward pop/rock angle is given a slight 'new music,' Devo-ish bent here." Billboard said it borrowed "aggressive mannerisms from the new wave."

== Track listing ==
No.	Title	Writer(s)	Length
1.	"Lovin' Every Minute of it"	Robert John "Mutt" Lange	3:30
2.	"Steal the Thunder"	Paul Dean, Mike Reno, Davitt Sigerson, Bill Wray	4:09
3.	"Friday Night"	Patrick Mahassen, Wray, Dean, Sigerson	3:33
4.	"This Could Be the Night"	Jonathan Cain, Dean, Reno, Wray	4:56
5.	"Too Much Too Soon"	Dean, Sigerson, Wray	4:07
6.	"Lead a Double Life"	Doug Johnson, Sigerson, Ted Johnson, Wray, Dean, Reno	4:20
7.	"Dangerous"	Bryan Adams, Jim Vallance	3:29
8.	"Destination Heartbreak"	Scott Smith, Wray, Reno, Dean	4:42
9.	"Bullet in the Chamber"	Dean, Sigerson, Wray, Reno	5:11

== Personnel ==
All information from the album booklet.

Loverboy

- Mike Reno – lead vocals
- Paul Dean – guitar, backing vocals, producer
- Doug Johnson – keyboards, Fairlight CMI, E-MU Emulator
- Scott Smith – bass, backing vocals
- Matt Frenette – drums, percussion, timbales

Additional backing vocals

- Jaime St. James
- Mark LaFrance
- Nancy Nash
- Ra McGuire
- Rick Livingstone
- Tommy Thayer

Production

- Tom Allom – producer
- Mark Dodson – engineer
- Bernie Grundman – mastering
- James O'Mara – photography
- Ron Obvious – assistant engineer
- Holland MacDonald – art direction
- Elizabeth Legge – artwork

== Charts ==
Chart (1985)	Peak position
Canada Top Albums/CDs (RPM)	22
German Albums (Offizielle Top 100)	54
US Billboard 200	13

== Certifications ==
Region	Certification	Certified units/sales
Canada (Music Canada)	2× Platinum	200,000^{‡}
United States (RIAA)	2× Platinum	2,000,000^{^}
^{^} Shipments figures based on certification alone.^{‡} Sales+streaming figures based on certification alone.
