= Turn Me Loose (Loverboy song) =

1981 single by Loverboy

Single by Loverboy

from the album Loverboy
- B-side: "Prissy Prissy"
- Released: February 7, 1981
- Recorded: 1979
- Genre: Hard rock; pop rock; disco
- Length: 5:38 (album); 3:30 (single/video)
- Label: Columbia
- Songwriters: Paul Dean, Mike Reno
- Producer: Bruce Fairbairn

Loverboy singles chronology
"Turn Me Loose" (1981)	"The Kid Is Hot Tonite" (1981)

"Turn Me Loose" is a song by Canadian rock band Loverboy. It was released in 1980 as the second track on their self-titled debut album in 1980, then as their debut single in 1981. Written by vocalist Mike Reno and guitarist Paul Dean, the song combines hard rock guitars, a disco beat and new wave keyboards.

It was a top ten hit in Australia, Canada, New Zealand and South Africa, while peaking at number 6 on the US Billboard Top Rock Tracks chart.

== Reception ==
Record World attributed the song's success to "Mike Reno's vocal plea, a guitar grind, and marvelous production."

== Charts ==
=== Weekly charts ===
Chart (1981)	Peak position
Australia (Kent Music Report)	3
Canada Top Singles (RPM)	7
New Zealand (Recorded Music NZ)	5
South Africa (Springbok)	4
US Billboard Hot 100	35
US Billboard Top Rock Tracks	6

=== Year-end charts ===
Year-end chart performance
Chart (1981)	Position
Australia (Kent Music Report)	12
Canada Top Singles (RPM)	48

== Certifications ==
Region	Certification	Certified units/sales
Canada (Music Canada)	Gold	75,000^{^}
New Zealand (RMNZ)	Gold	15,000^{‡}
^{^} Shipments figures based on certification alone.^{‡} Sales+streaming figures based on certification alone.

== Personnel ==
- Mike Reno – Lead vocals
- Paul Dean – Guitar, and Backing vocals
- Doug Johnson – Keyboards
- Scott Smith – Bass
- Matt Frenette – Drums

Additional musicians

- Nancy Nash – backing vocals
- Katie Kissoon – backing vocals

== Cover versions ==
- Tim Rogers and Tex Perkins covered it on their 2006 album My Better Half, under their recording alias T'N'T
- Electric Six covered the song on their cover album Mimicry and Memories (2015).

=== Young Divas version ===
"Turn Me Loose"

Single by Young Divas featuring Savage

from the album New Attitude
- B-side: "Dear Santa (Bring Me a Man)"
- Released: November 17, 2007
- Recorded: 2007
- Genre: Dance, pop
- Length: 3:50
- Label: Sony BMG
- Songwriters: Paul Dean, Mike Reno

Young Divas singles chronology
"Searchin'" (2007)	"Turn Me Loose" (2007)

Savage singles chronology
"They Don't Know" (2005)	"Turn Me Loose" (2007)	"Swing" (remix) (2008)

Music video
- "Turn Me Loose" on YouTube

"Turn Me Loose" was covered by Australian girl group Young Divas for their second studio album New Attitude. It was released physically and digitally as the lead single from the album on November 17, 2007. "Turn Me Loose" also features New Zealand rapper Savage and is the final single released by the Young Divas. The song peaked at number 15 on the ARIA Singles Chart. The music video for "Turn Me Loose" features the Young Divas singing and dancing in front of a white backdrop.

==== Track listing ====
CD single

1. "Turn Me Loose" – 3:50
2. "Dear Santa (Bring Me a Man This Christmas)" – 3:40

Digital EP

1. "Turn Me Loose" – 3:50
2. "Dear Santa (Bring Me a Man This Christmas)" – 3:40
3. "Turn Me Loose" (Divas Only Version) – 3:18

==== Weekly chart ====
Chart (2007)	Peak position
Australia (ARIA)	15

==== Year-end chart ====
Chart (2007)	Rank
Australian Artists Singles (ARIA)	35
