= Keep It Up =

Studio album by Loverboy
- Released: June 30, 1983
- Studios: Mushroom Studios, Vancouver, B.C., Canada
- Genre: Arena rock
- Length: 38:32
- Label: Columbia
- Producers: Bruce Fairbairn, Paul Dean

Loverboy chronology
Get Lucky (1981)	Keep It Up (1983)	Lovin' Every Minute of It (1985)

Singles from Keep It Up
- 1. "Strike Zone" Released: 1983; 2. "Hot Girls in Love" Released: 1983; 3. "Queen of the Broken Hearts" Released: 1983

Professional ratings
Review scores
Source	Rating
AllMusic	4/5 stars
Rolling Stone	2/5 stars

Keep It Up is the third studio album released by the Canadian rock band Loverboy in late June 1983. With new hit tracks like "Hot Girls in Love", the album became an instant hit, and reached #7 on the US Billboard 200 charts, as did the previous album released by the band.

== Track listing ==
No.	Title	Writer(s)	Length
1.	"Hot Girls in Love"	Paul Dean, Bruce Fairbairn	3:59
2.	"Strike Zone"	Paul Dean, Mike Reno, Scott Smith, Bruce Fairbairn	6:01
3.	"It's Never Easy"	Doug Johnson, Mike Reno, Paul Dean	4:07
4.	"Chance of a Lifetime"	Doug Johnson, Paul Dean, Mike Reno, Bruce Fairbairn	3:55
5.	"Queen of the Broken Hearts"	Paul Dean, Mike Reno	3:53
6.	"Prime of Your Life"	Doug Johnson, Paul Dean, Bruce Fairbairn	4:50
7.	"Passion Pit"	Paul Dean, Mike Reno, Bruce Fairbairn	4:25
8.	"One-Sided Love Affair"	Paul Dean, Mike Reno, Peter Taylor, Bruce Fairbairn	3:46
9.	"Meltdown"	Doug Johnson, Paul Dean, Mike Reno	3:31

== Personnel ==
All information from the album booklet.

Loverboy

- Mike Reno – lead vocals
- Paul Dean – guitar, backing vocals, producer
- Doug Johnson – keyboards
- Scott Smith – bass
- Matt Frenette – drums

Additional musicians

- Nancy Nash – backing vocals on "It's Never Easy"

Production

- Paul Dean – producer
- Bruce Fairbairn – producer
- Lindsay Kidd – engineer
- Mike Fraser – engineer
- Dave Ogilvie – engineer
- Bob Rock – engineer, mixing
- Keith Stein – engineer, recording
- George Marino – mastering
- Jean Piché – programming

== Charts ==
Chart (1983)	Peak position
Canada Top Albums/CDs (RPM)	9
German Albums (Offizielle Top 100)	25
US Billboard 200	7

== Certifications ==
Region	Certification	Certified units/sales
Canada (Music Canada)	3× Platinum	300,000^{‡}
United States (RIAA)	2× Platinum	2,000,000^{^}
^{^} Shipments figures based on certification alone.^{‡} Sales+streaming figures based on certification alone.
