= Heaven in Your Eyes =

Single by Loverboy

from the album Top Gun
- B-side: "Friday Night"
- Released: July 17, 1986
- Recorded: 1986
- Genre: Rock
- Length: 4:03 (7")
- Label: Columbia
- Songwriters: Paul Dean, John Dexter, Mae Moore, Mike Reno
- Producer: Dale Penner

Loverboy singles chronology
"Lead a Double Life" (1986)	"Heaven in Your Eyes" (1986)	"Notorious" (1987)

"Heaven in Your Eyes" is a song recorded by Canadian rock band Loverboy for the soundtrack to the film Top Gun. It later appeared on Loverboy's 1989 hits compilation Big Ones.

The song was originally written by Mae Moore and John Dexter, both Vancouver-area musicians. As recorded, it is credited to Moore, Dexter and Paul Dean and Mike Reno from Loverboy.

Cash Box called it a "powerful, emotional rock ballad." Billboard called it a "routine power ballad."

Noteworthy is the fact that Loverboy keyboardist Doug Johnson does not appear in the song's music video. His absence was intentional, as he felt that the Top Gun film over-glamorized war and military service.

== Charts ==
Chart (1986)	Peak position
US Billboard Hot 100	12
US Cash Box Top 100	10
Canada The Record Singles	30
Canada RPM Top Singles	24
