= Get Lucky (Loverboy album) =

Studio album by Loverboy
- Released: October 7, 1981
- Recorded: 1980–81
- Studio: Mushroom Studios
- Genre: Hard rock
- Length: 40:15
- Label: Columbia
- Producers: Bruce Fairbairn, Paul Dean

Loverboy chronology
Loverboy (1980)	Get Lucky (1981)	Keep It Up (1983)

Singles from Get Lucky
- 1. "Working for the Weekend" Released: October 1981; 2. "When It's Over" Released: 1982; 3. "Take Me to the Top" Released: 1982; 4. "Lucky Ones" Released: 1982; 5. "Jump" Released: 1982

Professional ratings
Review scores
Source	Rating
AllMusic	4/5 stars
Record Mirror	5/5 stars
Rolling Stone	3/5 stars

Get Lucky is the second studio album by Canadian hard rock band Loverboy. It was released on October 7, 1981, by Columbia Records. The album reached number 7 on the Billboard 200 album chart, remaining on the chart for over two years, and has sold over 4 million copies in the United States. It featured the singles "Working for the Weekend", "When It's Over", "Lucky Ones", and "Take Me to the Top.”

According to Scott Smith's notes on the Greatest Hits album Big Ones, the song "Take Me to the Top" is actually the demo version "complete with out of tune bass" because the band couldn't quite capture the sound in the studio.

The album was re-released as a digitally remastered CD in July 2006 to commemorate the 25th anniversary of its original release. The remastered album features four bonus tracks, all of which were previously unreleased demos.

== Artwork ==
The cover of the album depicts the posterior of someone wearing tight red leather pants, with a man's arm and hand in the foreground with index and middle finger crossed. The model wearing the leather pants was 13-year-old Tymara Kennedy, daughter of photographer David Michael Kennedy who shot the cover. The photo credit on the album stated "Bottom by: T.K.", which was sometimes interpreted as the publishing shorthand for the term to come. The use of red leather pants originated from Reno selecting a few items from a leather shop owned by the husband of the band manager's publicist.

Until 2014, various claims about the identity of the person wearing the leather pants were made. These included Mike Reno, the band's lead singer, who "just went along with" such claims, and Paul Dean, both of whom wore red leather pants during the concert tour for the album. At other times, both were ambiguous about the identity of the model. In a 2012 interview, Reno stated that the model was the photographer's daughter, a claim repeated in a 2013 interview. CBC Music confirmed the identity of the model in an interview with Steven Keller in August 2014. According to Kennedy, his stylist found only one pair of red leather pants while shopping in New York City before the photo shoot in 1981. They fit none of the band members or models on the set. At home later that day, his daughter returned from school, saw the pants, and asked to try them. They fit her, and Kennedy decided to use her as the model.

It is unknown whose hand and arm are in the picture. According to a 2015 article in The Toronto Star newspaper, an "Argentinian male model, six foot five" was hired "on the basis of his big hands". Tymara Kennedy died in an automobile crash in 1991, at 22 years old, with the cover to this album as her only modelling credit.

The cover was chosen as one of the 50 greatest Canadian album covers by CBC Music staff in 2014.

The cover of American singer Joan As Police Woman's 2020 album Cover Two is an homage to this Loverboy album.

== Track listing ==
No.	Title	Writer(s)	Length
1.	"Working for the Weekend"	Paul Dean, Matt Frenette, Mike Reno	3:41
2.	"When It's Over"	Dean, Reno	5:08
3.	"Jump"	Bryan Adams, Dean, Frenette, Reno, Jim Vallance	3:41
4.	"Gangs in the Street"	Dean, Reno	4:35
5.	"Emotional"	Dean	4:55
6.	"Lucky Ones"	Dean, Reno, Scott Smith, Denise Thurlow	3:51
7.	"It's Your Life"	Dean, Frenette, Johnson, Reno, Smith	4:05
8.	"Watch Out"	Dean, Johnson	4:02
9.	"Take Me to the Top"	Dean, Johnson, Reno	6:13

Bonus tracks on remastered edition

No.	Title	Writer(s)	Length
10.	"I Told You So (Demo)"		1:13
11.	"Boy Likes the Girl (Demo)"		4:32
12.	"Your Town Saturday Night (Demo)"		3:08
13.	"Working for the Weekend (Demo)"	Paul Dean, Matt Frenette, Mike Reno	3:47

== Personnel ==
All information from the album booklet.

Loverboy

- Mike Reno – lead vocals
- Paul Dean – guitar, backing vocals, lead vocal on "Emotional"
- Doug Johnson – keyboards
- Scott Smith – bass
- Matt Frenette – drums

Additional musicians

- Nancy Nash – backing vocals on "When It's Over"

Production

- Bruce Fairbairn – producer
- Keith Stein – engineer, recording
- Rob Porter – engineer, recording
- John Berg – cover design
- Bob Rock – mixing, engineer
- Mike Fraser – mixing, engineer
- George Marino – mastering
- David Kennedy – photography

== Charts ==
Chart (1981–1982)	Peak position
Australian Albums (Kent Music Report)	70
Canada Top Albums/CDs (RPM)	8
New Zealand Albums (RMNZ)	21
US Billboard 200	7

== Certifications ==
Region	Certification	Certified units/sales
Canada (Music Canada)	5× Platinum	500,000^{‡}
United States (RIAA)	4× Platinum	4,000,000^{^}
^{^} Shipments figures based on certification alone.^{‡} Sales+streaming figures based on certification alone.
