= Paul Dean (guitarist) =

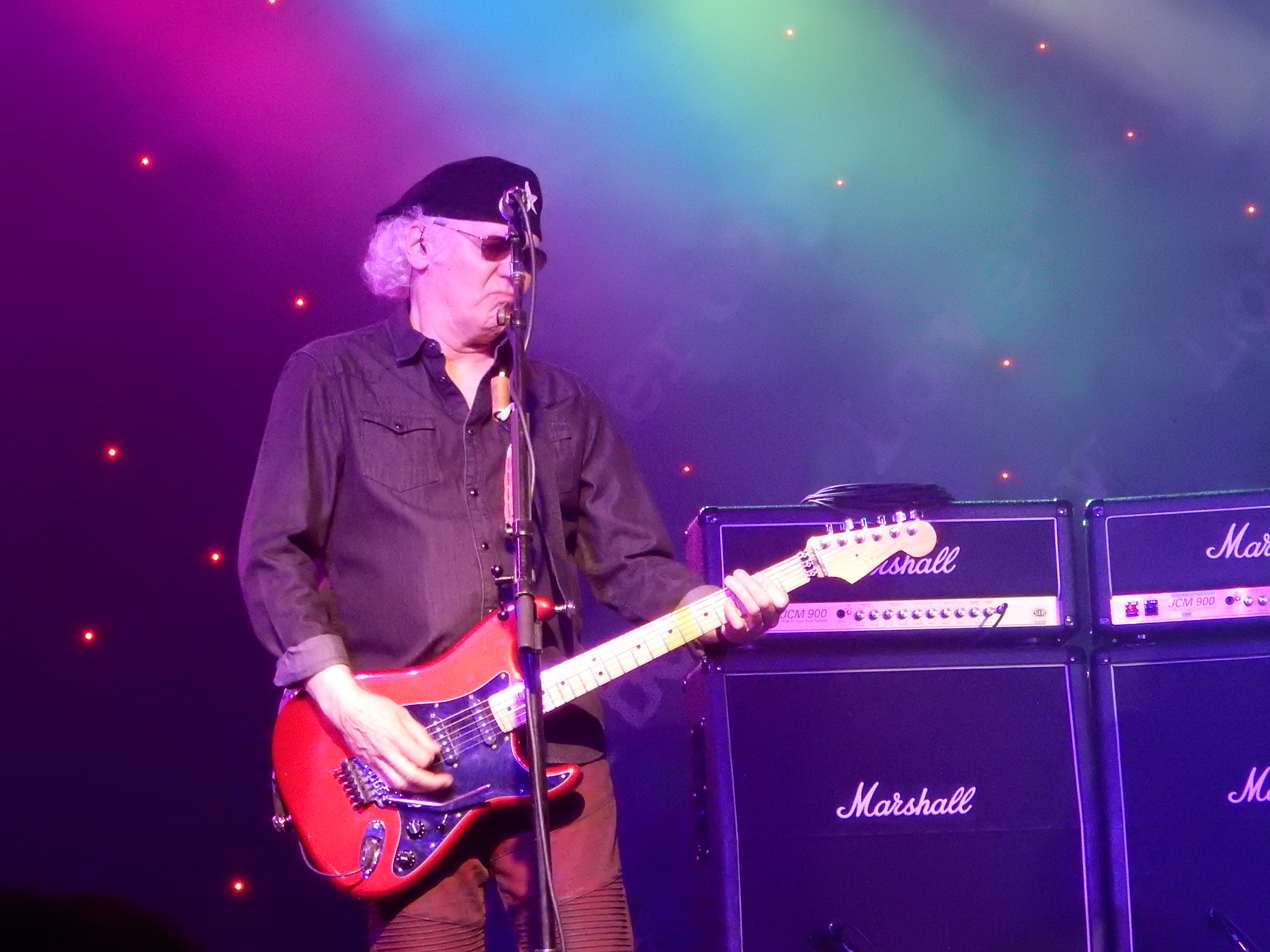
- Dean performing at the Snoqualmie Casino, 2018

Background information
- Born: February 19, 1946 (age 80); Vancouver, British Columbia, Canada
- Genres: Rock; hard rock; soft rock
- Occupation: Musician
- Instrument: Guitar
- Years active: 1970–present
- Labels: Capitol; Columbia

Paul Warren Dean (born February 19, 1946) is a Canadian musician and the lead guitarist of the Canadian rock band Loverboy which reached huge fame in the early 1980s.

== Biography ==
Growing up in Calgary, Alberta, Dean first started out playing washtub bass at the age of 12, followed by a plastic wind-up ukulele, which he received for Christmas at 13. He received his first guitar 2 months later, an acoustic, which he commenced to smash using it as a badminton racket. He next saved to buy his first electric guitar later that summer.

Dean's early musical influences included Duane Eddy, Luther Perkins, Hank Marvin, The Ventures, The Fireballs, Johnny and the Hurricanes, and later Led Zeppelin, Jeff Beck, The Beatles, Jimi Hendrix, and Boston.

Dean's first bands included Cannonball, the Great Canadian River Race, Canada (later known as Canada-Fox), and Scrubbaloe Caine. Scrubbaloe Caine released one album, Round One in 1973 before dissolving by 1975. A self-titled album that Canada-Fox recorded in 1970 was released in 2024.

Dean then met drummer Matt Frenette and joined Streetheart in Regina, Saskatchewan, in 1977. Dean, along with singer Kenny Shields, keyboard player Daryl Gutheil, bassist Ken Sinnaeve, and drummer Matt Frenette released their debut album Meanwhile Back in Paris in 1978.

In 1979, Dean and Frenette left Streetheart and returned to Calgary where they formed Loverboy with singer Mike Reno. Loverboy has since produced seven studio albums plus compilations and live albums, and a number of hit singles in Canada and the United States.

In 1982, Dean won the "Composer of the Year" Juno Award along with Reno for writing "Turn Me Loose" from Loverboy's self-titled 1980 debut album.

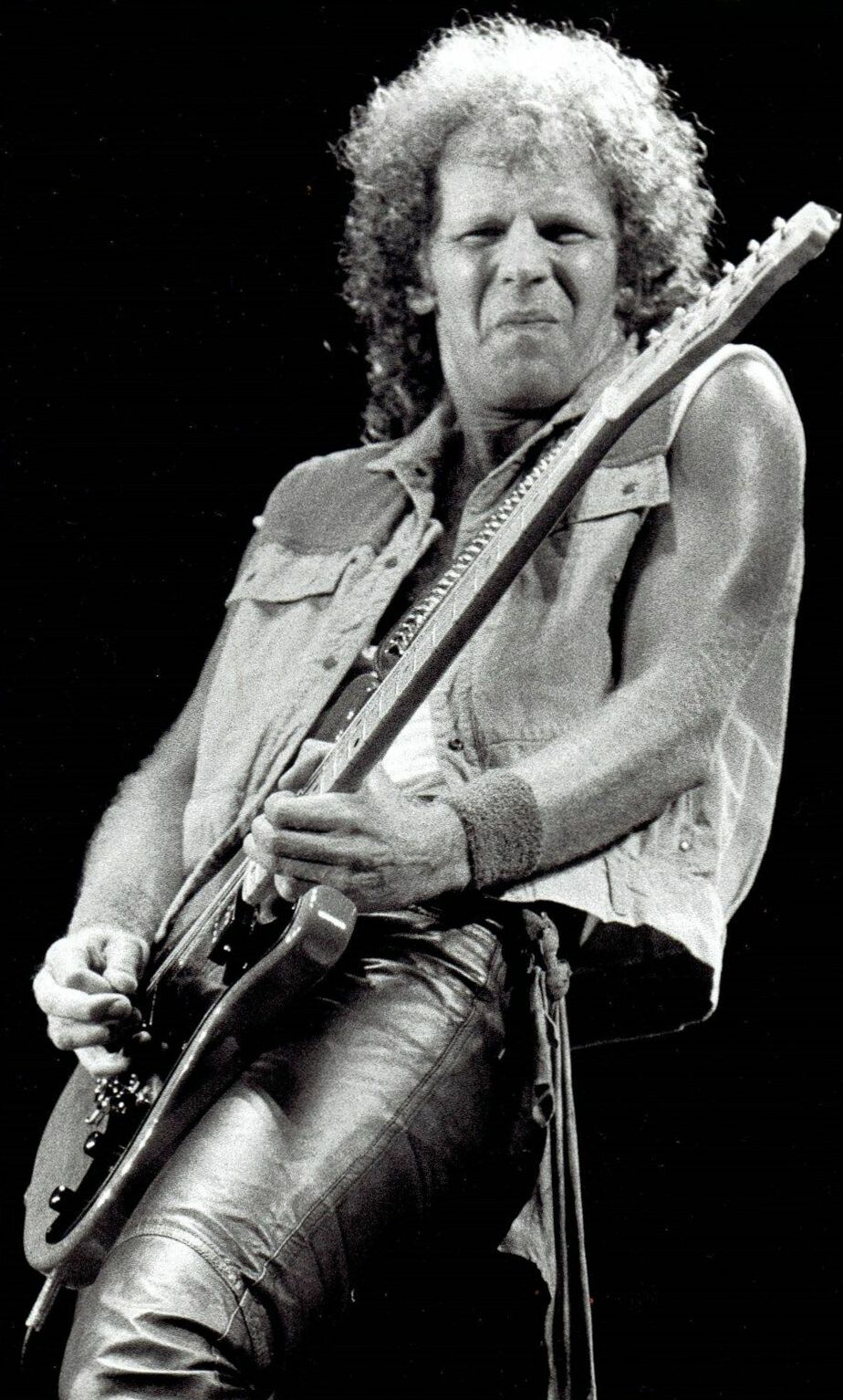
Dean performing at the Bayfront Center in St. Petersburg, Florida, circa 1983.

In 1989, Dean released his first solo album called Hard Core. The album is composed of nine tracks with songs co-written by other 1980s artists such as Bryan Adams and Paul Stanley (of Kiss fame). His second solo album, 1994's Machine, featured a blues sound with guest appearance from Reno. Dean released a third solo album in 1997 titled Blackstone.

Dean continues to tour and play live shows with Loverboy. The band's album, Just Getting Started, was initially released exclusively through Wal-Mart on October 30, 2007, and is now available on iTunes. Loverboy had a headlining spot at the 2007 Grey Cup party in Toronto.

At the 2009 Juno Awards Dean was inducted into the Canadian Music Hall of Fame as a member of Loverboy. The band's latest album was released in 2014.

== Personal life ==
Paul Dean currently lives in Vancouver with his wife and son.

== Equipment ==
Dean plays modified Fender Stratocaster and Gibson Les Paul guitars with Gibson T500 pickups, GHS Boomers guitar strings, modified Marshall 900 50 watt - 4500 amplifiers, Marshall 1960 speaker cabinets, Sennheiser wireless systems, TC Electronic G-System and Dunlop 60 guitar picks.

== Discography ==
=== Studio albums ===
- Hard Core (1989)
- Machine (1994)
- Blackstone (1997)

=== with Scrubbaloe Caine ===
- Round One (1973)

=== with Streetheart ===
- Meanwhile Back in Paris... (1978)

=== with Loverboy ===
- Loverboy (1980)
- Get Lucky (1981)
- Keep It Up (1983)
- Lovin' Every Minute of It (1985)
- Wildside (1987)
- Six (1997)
- Just Getting Started (2007)
- Rock 'n' Roll Revival (2012)
- Unfinished Business (2014)

=== with Canada-Fox ===
- Canada-Fox (2024)

=== Soundtrack appearances ===
Title	Release	With	Soundtrack
"Destruction"	1984	Loverboy	Metropolis
"Heaven in Your Eyes"	1986	Loverboy	Top Gun

== See also ==
- Loverboy
- Streetheart
