= Loverboy =

Canadian rock band

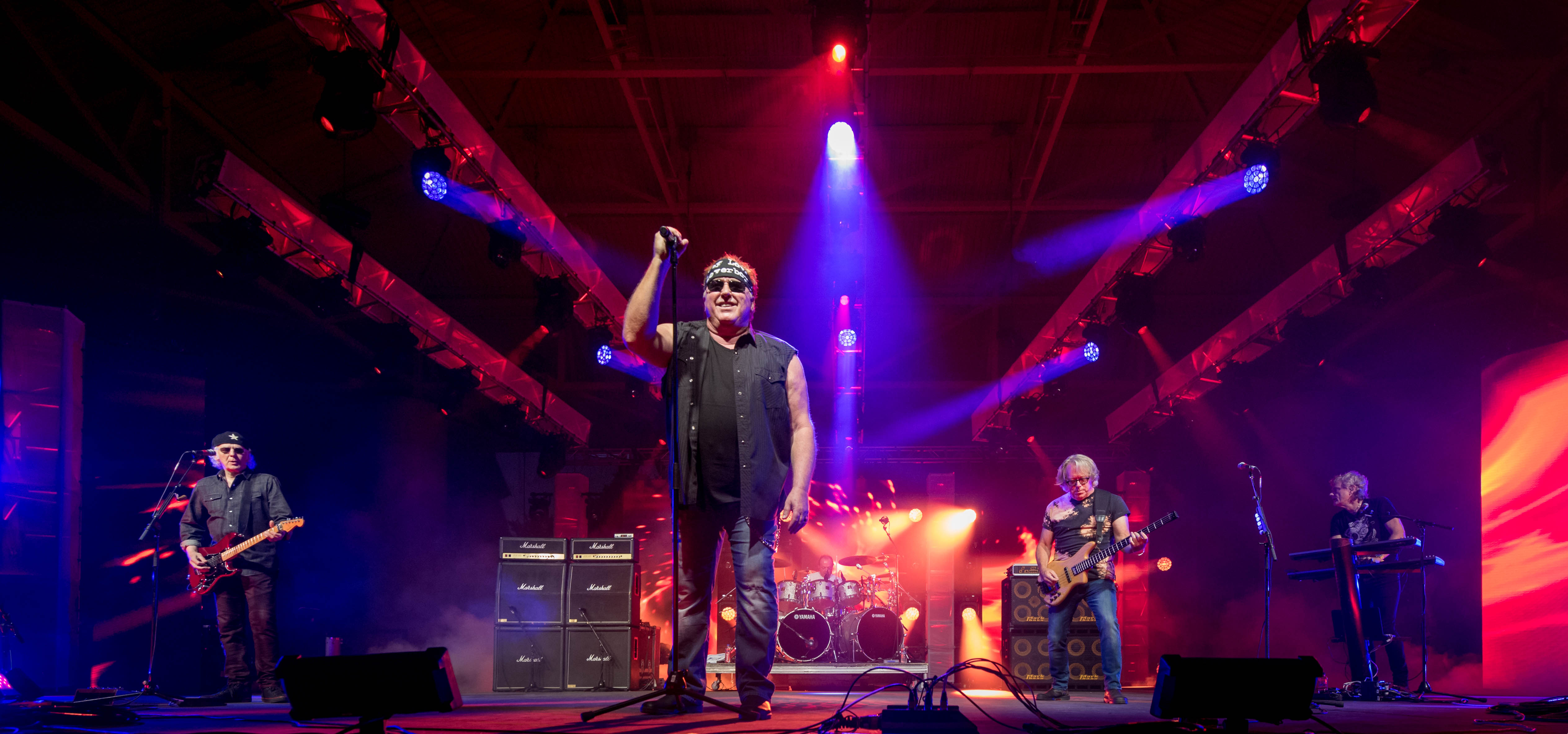
- Loverboy in 2017

Background information
- Origin: Calgary, Alberta, Canada
- Genres: Arena rock; hard rock; pop rock; new wave (early)
- Years active: 1979–1988; 1989; 1991–present
- Labels: Columbia; CMC International
- Members: Mike Reno; Paul Dean; Doug Johnson; Matt Frenette; Ken "Spider" Sinnaeve
- Past members: Jim Clench; Scott Smith
- Website: loverboyband.com

Loverboy is a Canadian rock band formed in Calgary, Alberta in 1979. Loverboy's hit singles, particularly "Turn Me Loose" and "Working for the Weekend", have become arena rock staples and are still heard on many classic rock and classic hits radio stations across Canada and the United States.

After being rejected by many American record labels, Loverboy signed with Columbia/CBS Records Canada and began recording the debut album on March 20, 1980. Founding members were lead singer Mike Reno (previously with Moxy as Mike Rynoski), guitarist Paul Dean (previously with Scrubbaloe Caine and Streetheart), keyboardist Doug Johnson, bassist Jim Clench (replaced after one gig by Scott Smith) and drummer Matt Frenette.

Throughout the 1980s, Loverboy accumulated numerous hit songs in Canada and the United States, earning four multi-platinum albums and selling millions of records. Except for a brief breakup from 1988 to 1991, the band has continued to perform live shows regularly. They are currently based in Vancouver.

== History ==
=== 1979–1983 ===
According to Reno, their name was chosen due to a dream by Paul Dean. He had come up with the name after spending the previous night with some of the bandmates, including Reno and their girlfriends, before going to the movies. The girlfriends were browsing through fashion magazines, where the guys in the band saw a Cover Girl advertisement. Cover Girl became Cover Boy, and then became Loverboy in Dean's dream later that night. After being told by Dean about the dream the next morning, Reno agreed to try it out and it stuck.

Dean's manager, Lou Blair, then brought in the biggest rock manager in Canada at that time, Bruce Allen, who took on the band and arranged for them to make their live debut opening for Kiss at Pacific Coliseum in Vancouver, British Columbia, on November 19, 1979.

Originally rejected by all the major record labels in the United States, the band signed with Columbia Records of Canada, and on March 20, 1980, Loverboy went into the studio with producer Bruce Fairbairn and engineer Bob Rock to record what would be its self-titled debut album.

Over that summer, the record became a huge hit with eventually over one million records sold in Canada alone. The album made its American debut in November 1980, and went on to sell over two million copies in the US. The band went on a touring spree that year putting on over 200 shows with bands such as Cheap Trick, ZZ Top, Kansas, and Def Leppard. Their debut single, "Turn Me Loose", went on to hit No. 7 on the Canadian charts and No. 35 on the US Billboard Hot 100 in early 1981. "The Kid Is Hot Tonite" was also a single.

The band's follow-up album, Get Lucky, released in October 1981 when it was opening for Journey, included the hit tracks "Working for the Weekend", "When It's Over", and "Lucky Ones". It became the group’s best selling album in the U.S., reaching No. 7 on the Billboard album charts and selling over four million copies. In the same year Loverboy received six Juno Awards (Canada's highest award for music) in one year, a record that still stands today.

Loverboy released its third album, Keep It Up, in June 1983. Its first single "Hot Girls in Love" became their most successful to that date, reaching No. 11 on the US Billboard Hot 100. The video for the song as well as for the follow-up single "Queen of the Broken Hearts" were hugely popular on MTV.

=== 1984–1989 ===
In 1984, Loverboy recorded the United States Team theme for the 1984 Summer Olympics, "Nothing's Gonna Stop You Now". The song originally appeared on The Official Music of the 1984 Games but not on any of its albums or compilations to date. The band would often play it on tour mixing it in during the performance of "Queen of the Broken Hearts".

Also in 1984, Loverboy recorded a song called "Destruction" which appeared on the 1984 soundtrack of a re-edited version of the film Metropolis (1927).

Lovin' Every Minute of It, the band's fourth album and first not produced by Fairbairn (it was produced by Tom Allom, best known for producing Judas Priest), was released in August 1985, with the title single written by Mutt Lange and "This Could Be the Night" co-written by Journey's Jonathan Cain becoming their first and second U.S. Billboard top 10 hits respectively.

In 1986, the band recorded "Heaven in Your Eyes", a song featured in the movie Top Gun, which peaked at No. 12 on the Billboard charts. Keyboardist Doug Johnson refused to appear in the video as he felt that the film glorified war, which he opposed.

The release of Wildside, the band's fifth album, followed in September 1987. While it scored a minor hit with "Notorious", co-written by Jon Bon Jovi and Richie Sambora, the album sold relatively poorly and the band broke up in 1988 due to tensions between Dean and Reno.

Dean released a solo album, Hardcore, in May 1989 and a Loverboy greatest-hits album, Big Ones, was released later that same year, in October, to fulfill Loverboy's obligation to Columbia Records. The group briefly reunited in late 1989 to tour (with Geraldo Valentino Dominelli on keyboards filling in for Johnson) to promote it, but broke up again at the tour's conclusion.

=== 1991–1999 ===
On October 6, 1991, the band reunited again to join fellow rockers Bryan Adams, Colin James, Chrissy Steele, and Bill Henderson of Chilliwack at a benefit show at Vancouver's 86 Street Music Hall to raise over $50,000 for Henderson's former bandmate, Brian MacLeod, who was fighting cancer and undergoing treatment at a Houston medical clinic. The band members reportedly recalled that the concert was the most fun that they had had in years and decided that they wanted to do it again. They went on another live touring spree in Canada the following year before launching a 64-concert tour in the United States in 1993.

The band's record label released its second and third compilation albums, Loverboy Classics and Temperature's Rising, in 1994. Loverboy Classics went Gold by 1998, coinciding with another American tour. This was followed by the releases of Six and Super Hits in 1997.

Keyboardist Richard Sera came on to fill in for Johnson in December 1996 through 1997.

=== 2000–2009: Death of Scott Smith ===
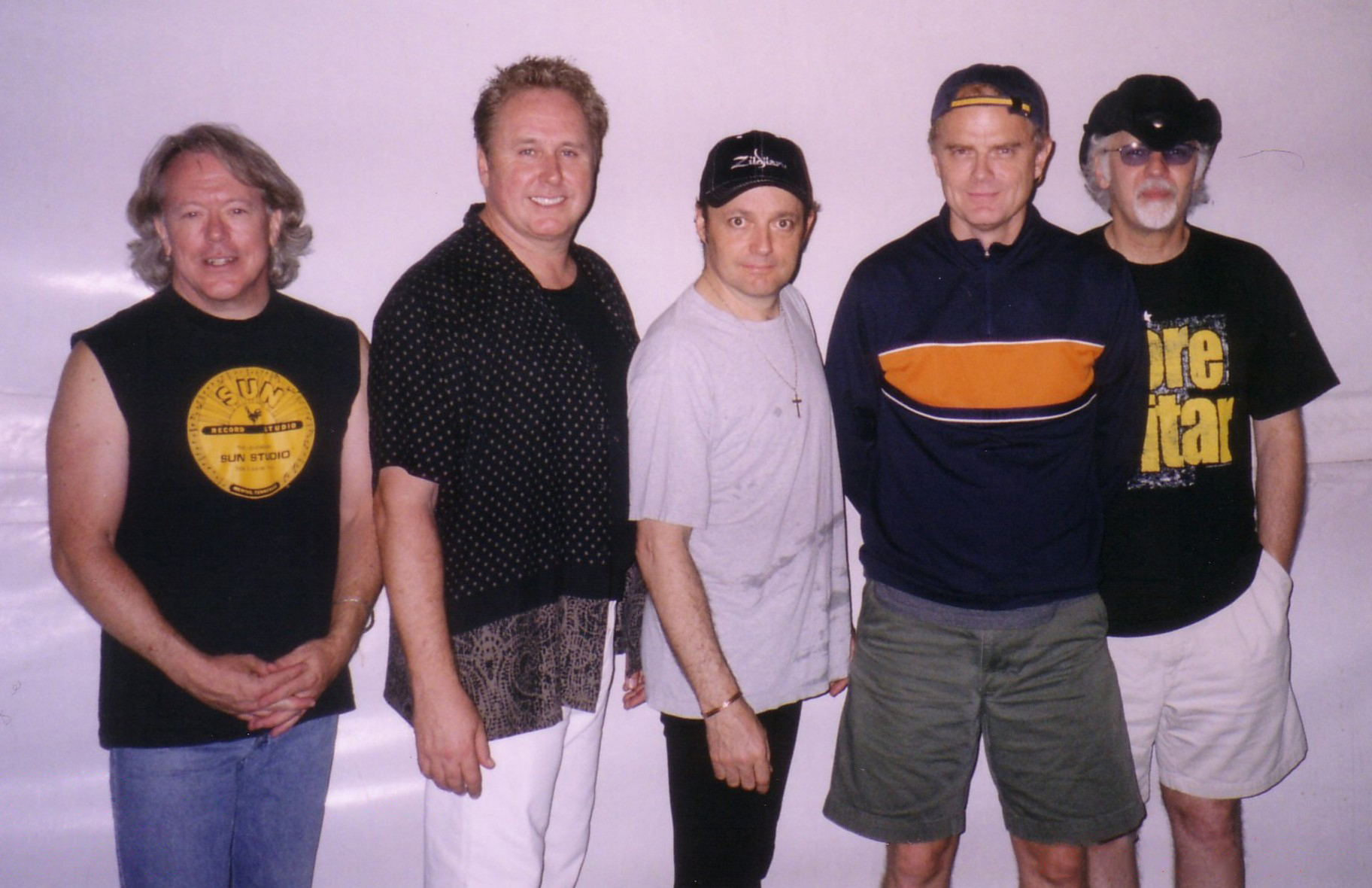
Loverboy in 2003

The band continued touring until November 30, 2000, when bassist Scott Smith was presumed dead after being washed overboard by a large wave while sailing in San Francisco Bay. He was 45 years old.

The band went on to release a live album, Live, Loud and Loose, in 2001, which consisted of refurbished early live concert recordings from the band's intense touring years from 1982 to 1986. The year 2001 also brought another round of touring, this time dedicated to Scott Smith. Ken "Spider" Sinnaeve, a former member of The Guess Who, Red Rider and Dean and Frenette's pre-Loverboy band Streetheart, joined the band on bass prior to the tour.

Loverboy celebrated 25 years together in 2005 and began to perform in selected cities to commemorate this milestone. That tour continued with live concerts scheduled well into August 2006. Also in 2005, Loverboy was one of the featured bands on the American version of Hit Me, Baby, One More Time. It performed "Working for the Weekend" and a cover version of "Hero" by Enrique Iglesias on the show.

In 2006, twenty-five years after its initial release, Get Lucky was remastered and re-released with several previously unreleased songs, including the original demo of "Working for the Weekend".

In a video interview from March 2007, Mike Reno confirmed that the band finished recording a new studio album released in 2007. Titled Just Getting Started, it was released in October, with a clip of the first single "The One That Got Away" available on the band's MySpace page. The band continues to tour throughout Canada and the United States.

The band was inducted into the Canadian Music Hall of Fame during the 2009 Juno Awards.

=== 2010–2019 ===
On February 21, 2010, the band performed at the 2010 Vancouver Olympics awards ceremony.

In June 2012, the band announced its album Rock 'n' Roll Revival would be released by Frontiers Records. The band was on tour with Journey and Pat Benatar/Neil Giraldo from July 24 to November 16, 2012. It finished up 2012 on the same tour when Night Ranger took up the reins to replace Benatar.

In 2013, Loverboy toured on and off for at least a few dates during every month, except for the month of March.

While continuing to tour in 2014, it was announced on the official Loverboy home page on June 19, 2014, that the band's newest album of all-original material, Unfinished Business, was expected to be released on July 15, 2014. The first single was already available for purchase on iTunes and the title of this song was "Countin' the Nights". The band toured during that summer, including at least two free shows.

In 2016, the band released two new singles, "Hurtin'" and "Some Like It Hot", the latter is described by Paul Dean as "the first and only shuffle Loverboy has ever done", comes from the same late 1970s period as several of the songs found on their previous album, 2014's Unfinished Business. "Giving it all away/Living for today," sings Mike Reno on the track – which originated as a demo, but was later rearranged and augmented by Dean, describing this latest as a "gift" from the band to its fans.

Dean went through more than 230 individual two-inch analog tapes he had transferred to digital, including this "gem" from the band's storied history. It follows the release of "Hurtin'" earlier this year. "The beauty of the Internet is the ability to make a song available right away, without waiting until you have the rest of the album done," says Dean. "It's a real boon to creativity. It's total grass roots, DIY. Like the lyrics to 'Some Like It Hot', we're not living for tomorrow or next year."

The single, artwork and accompanying music video – with a montage of a Loverboy program from the band's 1983 Keep It Up tour – prominently features the late bassist Scott Smith. "It was one of the first tunes we ever recorded," he said. "He's playing his ass off on it. I thought it was lost and gone forever. And, I think it would be a really good addition to our set list!"

In 2016, a commercial and digital short for National Car Rental started airing that features the band and major fan Patrick Warburton, best known for his role as David Puddy in Seinfeld. After Warburton touts that four out of five National rentals result in a free upgrade, the group piles into the rental car with Warburton and drives home the commercial's message with the title of one of their many hits, "Lovin' Every Minute of It". There is also a digital short, specifically made available on National Car Rental's YouTube channel, with Warburton having the group autograph their Get Lucky album, and pledging his devotion.

In 2017, the band released a new single, "Stop the Rain" and appeared at the Rockingham Festival 2017, held at Nottingham Trent University, UK, between October 20–22, 2017. The band headlined on Sunday, October 22, 2017.

=== 2020–present ===
In 2022 the band released a new single, "Release" and toured with REO Speedwagon and Styx.

In 2026, the band were inducted into the Canadian Songwriters Hall of Fame.

== Musical style ==
Loverboy has been described as arena rock, hard rock, pop rock and synth-rock, while their early work has been characterized as new wave.

== Band members ==
Current

- Mike Reno – lead vocals, occasional guitar (1979–1988, 1989, 1991–present)
- Paul Dean – guitar, backing vocals (1979–1988, 1989, 1991–present)
- Matt Frenette – drums, percussion (1979–1988, 1989, 1991–present)
- Doug Johnson – keyboards, synthesizers, piano, saxophone, harmonica, backing vocals (1979–1988, 1991–present)
- Ken "Spider" Sinnaeve – bass guitar, backing vocals (2001–present)

Former

- Jim Clench – bass guitar, backing vocals (1979; died 2010)
- Scott Smith – bass guitar, backing vocals (1979–1988, 1989, 1991–2000; disappeared 2000)

Touring

- Geraldo Valentino Dominelli – keyboards (1989)
- Richard Sera – keyboards (1996–1997)
- Jerry Wong – guitar, backing vocals (2022)

== Discography ==
Studio albums

- Loverboy (1980)
- Get Lucky (1981)
- Keep It Up (1983)
- Lovin' Every Minute of It (1985)
- Wildside (1987)
- Six (1997)
- Just Getting Started (2007)
- Rock 'n' Roll Revival (2012)
- Unfinished Business (2014)

== See also ==
- Canadian rock
- Music of Canada
- Canadian Music Hall of Fame
