= Mike Reno =

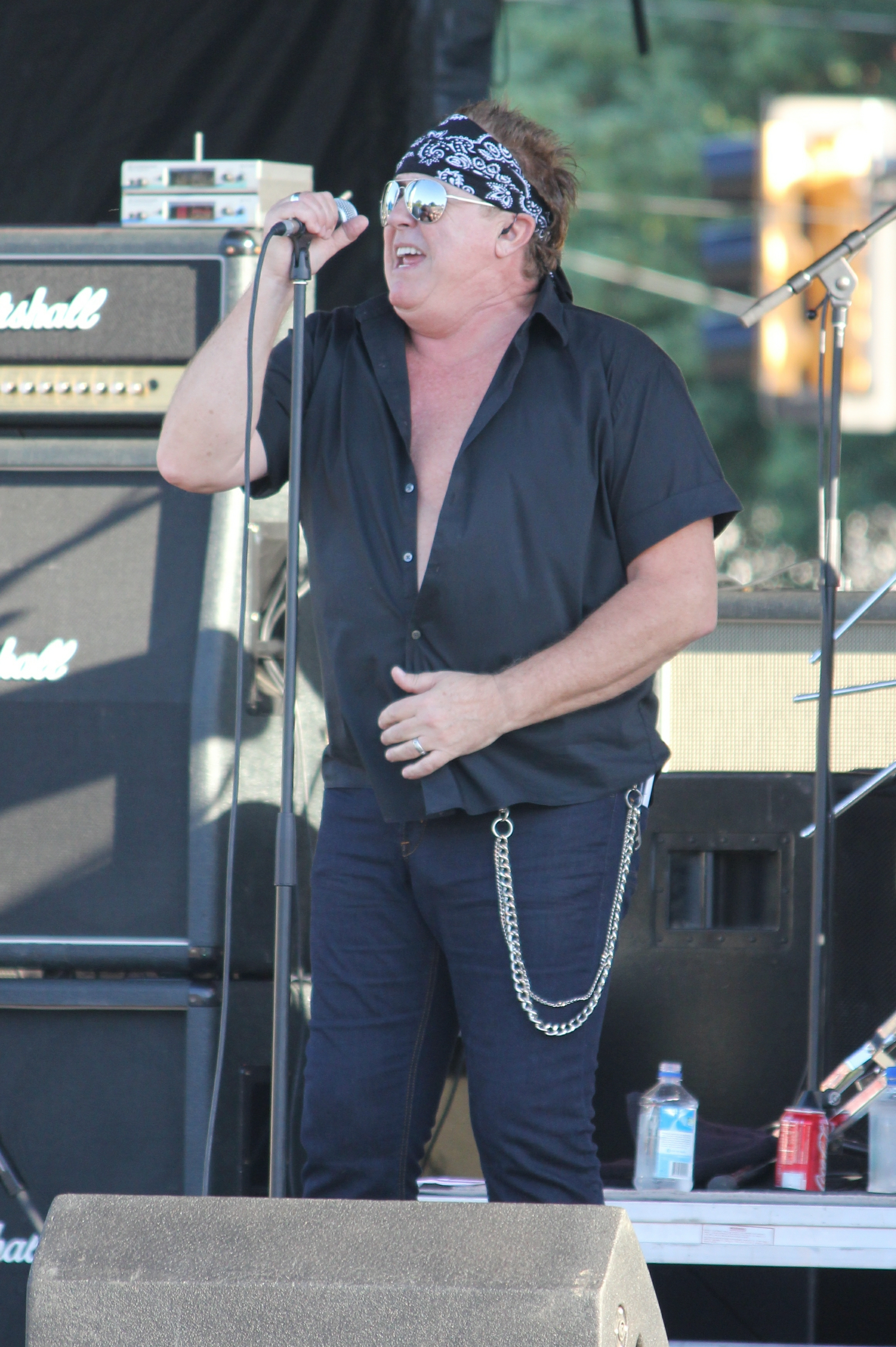
- Reno performing in 2013

Background information
- Born: Joseph Michael Rynoski; January 8, 1955 (age 71); New Westminster, British Columbia, Canada
- Genres: Rock, hard rock
- Occupations: Musician, singer
- Instruments: Vocals, drums, guitar
- Years active: 1978–present
- Label: Columbia

Mike Reno (born Joseph Michael Rynoski; born January 8, 1955) is a Canadian musician, singer and the lead singer of the rock band Loverboy. He fronted other bands, including Moxy, before helping form Loverboy. Reno also sang for the Canadian band Hammersmith in 1976.

== Early life and education ==
Reno was born in New Westminster, British Columbia, Canada. He spent his early years in the South Okanagan. Reno recalls writing songs when he was 12 or 13 years old. He graduated from Penticton Secondary School. He later pursued a career in music as a singer and songwriter.

== Career ==
During his high school years in the early 1970s, Reno joined a cover band called Morning Glory in which he played the drums. Eventually he joined the cover band Synergy. Later, Reno moved on to a band, Spunk, with guitarist Jack Stoltz.

After graduating from secondary school, Reno briefly joined the band Moxy for a single album, Under the Lights, released in 1978. It was something of a departure from the previous Moxy albums, partially because of changes in band members as well as Reno's different singing style, and did not sell as well as the band's earlier releases. Eventually, Reno was introduced to Paul Dean in 1979 at The Refinery, a nightclub. and they immediately got together for a jam session, which led to the formation of Loverboy shortly thereafter. Loverboy released its first album in 1980 and the band went on to tour extensively as well as release three more multi-platinum albums between 1981 and 1985. Loverboy's last full album of original material in the 1980s was Wildside (1987), though they included three new original songs on the compilation album Big Ones (1989). In the late 1990s, Reno attributed the decline of Loverboy to the rise of grunge bands such as Pearl Jam and Nirvana.

Reno has contributed to various film soundtracks. Most prominently, he performed "Almost Paradise" (1984) in a duet with Ann Wilson (of Heart), for the movie Footloose. With Loverboy, the band contributed "Heaven in Your Eyes" for the movie Top Gun (1986). Reno contributed the song "Chasing the Angels" for the soundtrack to Iron Eagle II (1988) along with the song "Whenever There's a Night" for the movie Dream a Little Dream (1989).

Reno also reportedly recorded a cover of "Never Been to Spain", a song that was originally written by Hoyt Axton and recorded by Three Dog Night for their album Harmony (1971). The Three Dog Night version went to #1 on the charts. In 1990 Reno co-wrote and performed the song "All I Ever Needed" from the David Foster album River of Love. In 2003, artist Tim Feehan released a solo album Tracks I Forgot About containing a song that features Reno on vocals, "Call of the Wild".

In 2002, Reno released his first solo album, Renovation, containing ten tracks closely resembling the sound of his work with Loverboy; some CDs contain a bonus track, "Guilty as Charged." The album was reportedly recorded in 1992, and was supposed to be released by Sony, but they chose instead to indefinitely shelve the project due to changes in the music industry. Reno eventually proceeded to release the un-mastered recordings from his own archival tapes on his now defunct website but went on to release the album widely on a variety of sources. The main complaint amongst critics and fans is a lack of mastering, overall production and polishing commonly found on finished albums... but hard core fans and critics seem to feel the album is more than worthy of attention in spite of this.

Loverboy had a headlining spot at the 2007 Grey Cup party in Toronto. At the 2009 Juno Awards, Reno was inducted into the Canadian Music Hall of Fame as a member of Loverboy. Loverboy also played as a part of the 2010 Olympics ceremonies in Vancouver on February 21, 2010. This night, otherwise known as "Nunavut Night", was also headlined by Trooper.

Although Loverboy was sidelined during the COVID-19 pandemic, they resumed performing in 2022. As of 2024, Reno continues to tour and play live shows with Loverboy.

== Personal life ==
Reno maintains a residence in Vancouver, British Columbia, but he also resides in Palm Springs, California.

== Discography ==
=== Studio albums ===
- Renovation (2002)

=== with Moxy ===
- Under the Lights (1978)

=== with Loverboy ===
- Loverboy (1980)
- Get Lucky (1981)
- Keep It Up (1983)
- Lovin' Every Minute of It (1985)
- Wildside (1987)
- Six (1997)
- Just Getting Started (2007)
- Rock 'n' Roll Revival (2012)
- Unfinished Business (2014)

=== with Just·If·I ===
- All One People (1993)

=== Guest appearances ===
Title	Release	Contribution	Other artist(s)	Album
"Remember the Heroes"	1982	Co-lead vocals	Sammy Hagar, Jonathan Cain	Three Lock Box
"We Got the Fire"	1985	Backup vocals	Black 'n Blue	Without Love
"Call of the Wild"	1989	Backup vocals	Tim Feehan	Tracks I Forgot About
"All I Ever Needed"	1990	Lead vocals, co-writer	David Foster	River of Love
"River of Love"	1991	Backup vocals	David Foster, Alex Brown, Bill Champlin, Bryan Adams, Hamish Stuart, Portia Griffin, Rio, Tamara Champlin, Vesta Williams, Warren Wiebe	River of Love

=== Soundtrack appearances ===
Title	Release	Other artist(s)	Soundtrack
"Almost Paradise"	1984	Ann Wilson	Footloose
"Dangerous"	1984	Loverboy	Metropolis
"Heaven in Your Eyes"	1986	Loverboy	Top Gun
"Chasing the Angels"	1988		Iron Eagle II
"Dream Machine"	1988		Watchers
"Whenever There's a Night"	1989		Dream a Little Dream
