= Cinderella (1997 film) =

1997 television film directed by Robert Iscove

- Home video promotional poster, featuring Houston and Brandy as their respective characters.
- Also known as: Rodgers & Hammerstein's Cinderella
- Genre: Musical; Fantasy
- Based on: Cendrillon by Charles Perrault; Cinderella by Oscar Hammerstein II
- Written by: Robert L. Freedman
- Directed by: Robert Iscove
- Starring: Brandy Norwood; Jason Alexander; Victor Garber; Whoopi Goldberg; Whitney Houston; Bernadette Peters; Veanne Cox; Natalie Desselle-Reid; Paolo Montalban
- Composer: Richard Rodgers
- Country of origin: United States
- Original language: English

Production
- Executive producers: Whitney Houston; Debra Martin Chase; Craig Zadan; Neil Meron; David R. Ginsburg
- Producers: Mike Moder; Chris Montan
- Cinematography: Ralf D. Bode
- Editors: Casey O. Rohrs; Tanya M. Swerling
- Running time: 88 minutes
- Production companies: Walt Disney Television; BrownHouse Productions; Storyline Entertainment
- Budget: $12 million

Original release
- Network: ABC
- Release: November 2, 1997

Rodgers & Hammerstein's Cinderella (also known as simply Cinderella) is a 1997 American musical fantasy television film produced by Walt Disney Television, directed by Robert Iscove, and written by Robert L. Freedman. Based on the French fairy tale of the same name by Charles Perrault, the film is the second remake and third version of Rodgers and Hammerstein's musical, which originally aired on television in 1957. Adapted from Oscar Hammerstein II's book, Freedman modernized the script to appeal to more contemporary audiences by updating its themes, particularly re-writing its main character into a stronger heroine. Co-produced by Whitney Houston, who also appears as Cinderella's Fairy Godmother, the film stars Brandy in the title role and features a racially diverse ensemble cast consisting of Jason Alexander, Whoopi Goldberg, Bernadette Peters, Veanne Cox, Natalie Desselle, Victor Garber, and Paolo Montalban.

Following the success of the 1993 television adaptation of the stage musical Gypsy (1959), Houston approached Gypsy's producers Craig Zadan and Neil Meron about starring in a remake of Rodgers & Hammerstein's Cinderella for CBS. However, development was delayed for several years, during which time the network grew disinterested in the project. By the time the film was greenlit by Disney for ABC, Houston felt that she had outgrown the title role, which she offered to Brandy instead. The decision to use a color-blind casting approach originated among the producers to reflect how society had evolved by the 1990s, with Brandy becoming the first Black actress to portray Cinderella on screen. Among the most significant changes made to the musical, several songs from other Rodgers and Hammerstein productions were interpolated into the film to augment its score. With a production budget of $12 million, Rodgers & Hammerstein's Cinderella ranks among the most expensive television films ever made.

Heavily promoted to re-launch the anthology series The Wonderful World of Disney, Rodgers & Hammerstein's Cinderella premiered on ABC on November 2, 1997, to mixed reviews from critics. While most reviewers praised the film's costumes, sets and supporting cast, particularly Peters, Alexander and Goldberg, television critics were divided over Brandy and Houston's performances, as well as Disney's more feminist approach to Brandy's character. Despite this, Cinderella proved a major ratings success, originally airing to 60 million viewers and establishing itself as the most-watched television musical in decades, earning ABC its highest Sunday-night ratings in 10 years. Rodgers & Hammerstein's Cinderella was nominated for several industry awards, including seven Primetime Emmy Awards, winning one for Outstanding Art Direction for a Variety or Music Program. The program's success inspired Disney and ABC to produce several similar musical projects.

Critical reception towards the film has improved over time, with several media publications ranking it among the best film adaptations of the fairy tale. Rodgers & Hammerstein's Cinderella is regarded by contemporary critics as a groundbreaking film due to the unprecedented diversity of its cast and Brandy's role.

== Plot ==
Orphaned at a young age, a young woman named Cinderella grows distracted while waiting upon her stepmother and her two stepsisters in the marketplace, where she meets a charming young man. Despite being apprehensive about introducing herself to him, the pair bond upon realizing that both are dissatisfied with their sheltered home lives. After being scolded for speaking to a stranger, Cinderella returns to her stepfamily's aid before she was able to realize the young man is Prince Christopher. He returns to the palace, where he is apprehended by his valet Lionel for once again visiting the kingdom disguised as a commoner, and learns that his parents, Queen Constantina and King Maximillian, plan to host a ball in order to find their son a suitable bride, an idea he strongly protests because he would rather marry for love. At Lionel's suggestion, Constantina and Maximillian compromise that should Christopher not be successful in choosing a bride at the ball, he be allowed to find one on his own terms.

Back at their own home, Cinderella wishes to attend the ball herself, but her stepmother ridicules the idea, advising her that a prince would never be interested in her and to remain grateful for her current life. Solely determined to bolster their own wealth and social status by marrying the prince, Cinderella's stepfamily leaves for the ball, leaving Cinderella home alone. Cinderella is soon visited by her Fairy Godmother for the first time, who encourages her to go to the ball; she magically transforms a pumpkin into a carriage, rats into footmen and a coachman, mice into horses, and her rags into a beautiful ballgown, complete with a pair of glass slippers. With her Fairy Godmother's warning that the spell will only last until midnight, Cinderella leaves for the ball.

Yet to be impressed with any of the young women he meets, including Cinderella's Stepsisters, Christopher is growing weary until Cinderella arrives, and the pair instantly start dancing much to the annoyance of Cinderella's stepfamily, who can't help but feel that the unidentified princess is familiar. Cinderella grows dismayed and wishes to leave when the King and Queen ask her about her background, but her Fairy Godmother encourages her to stay. The clock strikes midnight as Cinderella and the Prince share their first kiss, but Cinderella flees on foot while the spell is reverted, leaving behind a single glass slipper. With his parents' blessing, Christopher declares that he will marry whoever fits the slipper, even if it means trying it on every maiden in the kingdom.

When Cinderella's stepfamily return home, they begin sharing embellished recounts of their evening. Cinderella explains that she can only imagine what it must have been like, and they briefly bond over the memory, only for the Stepmother to soon recognize Cinderella as the mysterious princess with whom the Prince danced and insisting that she will never be more than a common girl. With final encouragement from her Fairy Godmother, Cinderella finally decides she will run away from home.

When the Prince and Lionel arrive at Cinderella's home, the Stepmother locks Cinderella in the kitchen hoping to keep her hidden. Cinderella's stepfamily – including the Stepmother and the Two Stepsisters– tries on the slipper with little success. Lionel demands that the kitchen be unlocked and searched, and the Prince discovers Cinderella in the courtyard about to run away. When Christopher recognizes Cinderella from the marketplace, he tries the slipper on her foot, and it fits perfectly. In the end, Cinderella and the Prince marry in a grand ceremony, while the palace gates close on her uninvited stepfamily.

== Cast ==
- Brandy Norwood as Cinderella
- Paolo Montalban as Prince Christopher, Cinderella's husband
- Jason Alexander as Lionel
- Victor Garber as King Maximillian, Christopher's father
- Whoopi Goldberg as Queen Constantina, Christopher's mother
- Whitney Houston as Fairy Godmother
- Bernadette Peters as Cinderella's Wicked stepmother
- Veanne Cox as Calliope, Cinderella's older stepsister
- Natalie Desselle-Reid as Minerva, Cinderella's older stepsister

== Musical numbers ==
- "The Sweetest Sounds" (from No Strings, lyrics by Richard Rodgers) - Cinderella, Prince Christopher
- "The Prince Is Giving A Ball" - Queen Constantina, Lionel, Stepmother, Stepsisters
- "In My Own Little Corner" - Cinderella
- "Falling In Love With Love" (from The Boys from Syracuse, lyrics by Lorenz Hart) - Stepmother, Stepsisters
- "Impossible - It's Possible" - Fairy Godmother, Cinderella
- "Ten Minutes Ago" - Prince Christopher, Cinderella
- "Stepsister's Lament" - Stepsisters
- "Do I Love You Because You're Beautiful" - Prince Christopher, Cinderella
- "A Lovely Night" - Cinderella, Stepsisters, Stepmother
- "There Is Music In You" (from Main Street to Broadway) - Fairy Godmother

== Production ==
=== Origins and development ===
Rodgers & Hammerstein's Cinderella was the third screen version of the musical. Songwriters Richard Rodgers and Oscar Hammerstein II originally wrote Cinderella as a musical exclusively for television starring Julie Andrews, which aired in 1957 to 107 million viewers. The telecast was remade in 1965 starring Lesley Ann Warren, airing annually on CBS from 1965 to 1972. The idea to remake Cinderella for television a second time originated as early as 1992, at which time producers Craig Zadan and Neil Meron first approached the Rodgers & Hammerstein Organization about obtaining the screen rights to the production. Further development was inspired by the success of CBS' adaptation of the stage musical Gypsy (1993) starring Bette Midler which, in addition to being credited with reviving interest in the genre, Zadan and Meron had also produced; CBS executive Jeff Sagansky asked Zadan and Meron to start brainstorming ideas for a follow-up shortly after Gypsy premiered. The day after Gypsy's original broadcast, Whitney Houston's agent Nicole David asked the producers if they were interested in developing a similar project starring her client, to whom they suggested Cinderella with Houston playing the title role. CBS originally intended to air the completed film by the end of the 1994-1995 television season, but the project was continuously delayed. The network grew disinterested in favor of other titles by 1996, while Houston herself was already committed to several other projects. Zadan explained that, because of her popularity, Houston "had so many other concrete things that she was doing that 'Cinderella' took a back seat". The singer eventually aged to the point at which she no longer felt suitable for the role of Cinderella. Houston explained that by the time she became a wife and mother, she was not "quite feeling like Cinderella" anymore, believing that portraying the ingenue would require significant "reaching" for herself as an actress.

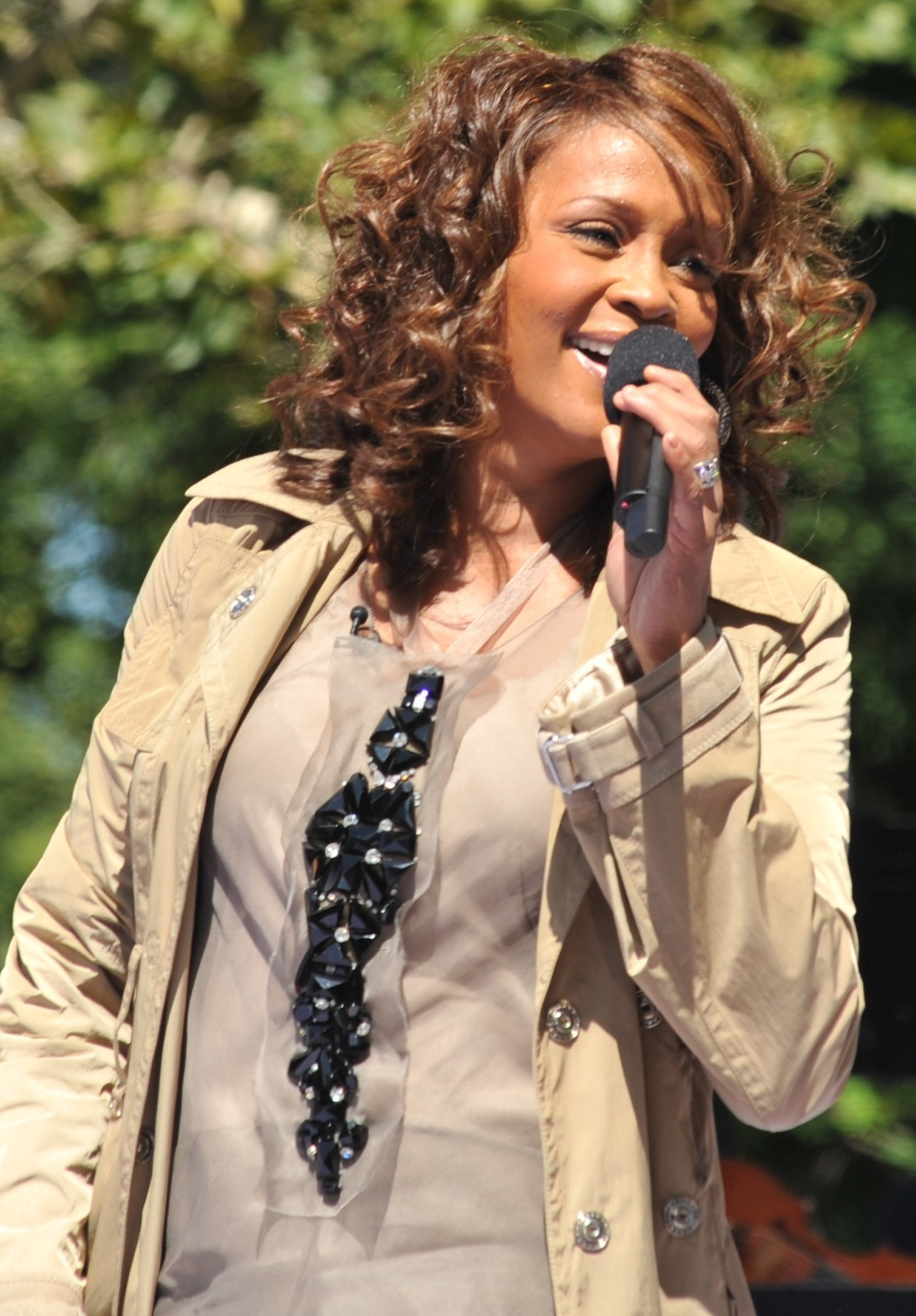
Singer and actress Whitney Houston (pictured in 2009) originally intended to play Cinderella herself. However, feeling that she had outgrown the role by the time the film was greenlit, she opted to play the character's Fairy Godmother instead, in addition to producing the film.

By the late 1990s, Disney had grown interested in reviving their long-running anthology program The Wonderful World of Disney. Hoping to relaunch the series using "a big event", Disney CEO Michael Eisner approached Zadan and Meron about potential television projects; the producers suggested Houston's Cinderella, which Eisner green-lit immediately. After relocating their production company, Storyline Entertainment, from CBS to Disney Studios, Zadan and Meron re-introduced the project to Houston. Agreeing that Cinderella required a certain "naivete ... that's just not there when you're 30-something", the producers suggested that Houston play Cinderella's fairy godmother instead, a role she accepted because it was "less demanding" and time-consuming. For the title role, Houston recommend singer Brandy, a close friend, in her first major film appearance. Brandy had been starring on the sitcom Moesha at the time but was still relatively new to television audiences, despite her success as a recording artist. Houston believed that Brandy possessed the energy and "wonder" to play Cinderella convincingly, admitting that their fictional relationship as godmother and goddaughter translates "well on-screen because it starts from real life"; when Houston telephoned Brandy to offer her the role, she introduced herself as her fairy godmother. Brandy, who identified "Cinderella" as her favorite fairy tale, was the first person of color to portray the character on screen, with both Brandy and Houston becoming the first African-American actresses to play their respective roles in any screen adaptation of the fairy tale, although an all-Black modern-day re-telling of "Cinderella" entitled Cindy had premiered in 1978.

Brandy likened being hand-selected for Cinderella by a performer she idolizes to a real-life fairy tale, accepting the role because she already had successful singing and acting careers, in addition to relating to the main character in several ways. The fact that Cinderella is traditionally depicted as white did not discourage Brandy from pursuing the role. Having grown up watching Caucasian actresses portray Cinderella, Houston felt that 1997 was "a good time" to cast a woman of color as the title character, claiming the choice to use a multi-cultural cast "was a joint decision" among the producers, who agreed that every "generation [should] have their own 'Cinderella'." Executive producer Debra Martin Chase explained that, despite enjoying Warren's performance as Cinderella, she and Houston "realized we never saw a person of color playing Cinderella", explaining, "To have a black [sic] Cinderella ... is just something. I know it was important for Whitney to leave this legacy for her daughter." Chase hoped that the film mirroring an evolving society "will touch every child and the child in every adult", encouraging "children of all colors [to] dream." One Disney executive would have preferred to have a white Cinderella and Black Fairy Godmother and suggested singer-songwriter Jewel for the title role. The producers refused, insisting that "The whole point of this whole thing was to have a black [sic] Cinderella." Zadan maintains that Brandy was the only actress they had considered for the role, elaborating, "it's important to mention because it shows that even at that moment there was still resistance to having a black [sic] Cinderella. People were clearly still thinking, 'Multicultural is one thing, but do we have to have two black [sic] leads?"

Robert Iscove was enlisted as the film's director, with Chris Montan and Mike Moder producing alongside Zadan and Meron. Houston was retained as an executive producer, alongside Chase. The film was co-produced by Walt Disney Telefilms, Storyline Entertainment and Houston's own production company BrownHouse Productions, becoming the latter's first project and Houston's executive producing debut. The film has a total of five executive producers: Houston, Chase, Zadan, Meron and David R. Ginsburg. Houston remained heavily involved in the film's production aspects, despite being relegated to a supporting acting role, retaining final approval over all creative decisions, particularly its multiracial cast. In addition to developing a good relationship with each other, the producers established a strong rapport with Rodgers & Hammerstein Organization President Ted Chapin. Although they were originally concerned that the organization would dismiss the idea of a multi-cultural cast, they were surprised when the company did not protest whatsoever. Mary Rodgers and James Hammerstein, relatives of the original composers, also approved this casting decision, with Mary maintaining that the production remains "true to the original" despite contemporary modifications to its cast and score, and James describing the film as "a total scrambled gene pool" and "one of the nicest fantasies one can imagine". James also believes Hammerstein would have approved of the color-blind casting, claiming he would have asked why the process took as long as it did. Meron believes that the organization was so open due to Houston's involvement, explaining, "Whitney was so huge at that time; to a lot of executives she was popular entertainment as opposed to being defined by her race."

=== Writing ===
Television writer Robert L. Freedman became involved with the project as early as 1993. Although he had not written a musical before, Freedman was fond of Warren's version and drawn to the opportunity to work with Zadan and Meron, whose plans to remake Cinderella he had first read about in a Variety article. Aware that the film could potentially be groundbreaking, Freedman, Zadan and Meron collaborated on several new ideas for the remake, among them ensuring that Cinderella "was defined by more than falling in love", providing her with her own story arc that is beyond simply finding a love interest. The Rodgers & Hammerstein Organization allowed the filmmakers an unusual amount of freedom to modify the musical's script, among these changes making Cinderella a more active heroine; Meron credits Freedman with "giv[ing] her a little bit more of a backbone", ultimately developing the character into a more independent woman. Instead of making each character more modern, Zadan opted to "contemporize the qualities of the characters" instead. Freedman was more concerned with writing a film suitable for young girls in the 1990s than writing a multi-cultural film, inspired by stories about his wife being affected by women's representation in films when she was growing up. In a conscious decision to update the fairy tale for a modern generation, Freedman sought to deconstruct the messages young girls and boys were subjected to in previous versions of the fairy tale, explaining, "We didn't want the message to be 'just wait to be rescued", and thus altered the story to "reflect current ideas about what we should be teaching children." Attempting to eliminate the element that Cinderella is simply waiting to be rescued by the prince, Freedman explained, "I'm not saying that it's the most feminist movie you'll ever see, but it is compared the other versions." His efforts apply to both Cinderella and the prince; while Cinderella pines for independence from her stepfamily and actively disagrees with her stepmother's opinions about gender roles in marriage, the prince protests the idea of being married off to simply anyone his parents choose.

Freedman continuously re-wrote the script between 1993 and 1997, particularly concerned about whether or not Houston would like his teleplay. Despite quickly earning approval from the Rodgers & Hammerstein Organization, Houston typically took longer to make decisions, and although the producers sent and continuously reminded her about the script, it remained unread for several months. Since Houston was still slated to play Cinderella at the time, production was unable to proceed without her involvement. In a final attempt to earn Houston's approval, Meron and Zadan enlisted Broadway actors to perform a read-through for the singer, namely La Chanze as Cinderella, Brian Stokes Mitchell as the prince, Theresa Meritt as the Fairy Godmother and Dana Ivey as the Stepmother. They hosted the table-read at the Rihga Royal Hotel in New York City, one of Houston's favorite locations at the time. Houston arrived at the reading several hours late, by which time some of the actors had grown frustrated and weary. Houston remained silent for most of the reading, barely engaging with the participants until the end of the table read when she finally declared her approval of the script and eventually sent the actors flowers to apologize for her tardiness. Houston believed strongly in the story's positive moral "that nothing is impossible and dreams do come true," encouraging the filmmakers to imbue their version of Cinderella "with a 90s sensibility but to remain faithful to the spirit of the original." Freedman identified Houston's eventual re-casting as the Fairy Godmother as a moment that instigated "the next round of rewriting", adapting her version of the character into a "worldly-wise older sister" to Cinderella, as opposed to the "regal maternal figure" that had been depicted prior. Houston described her character as "sassy, honest and very direct ... all the things that you'd like a godmother to be." Houston found the most impressive part of the remake to be "the lessons youngsters can learn about dreams and self-image".

According to Ray Richmond of Variety, Freedman's teleplay is faster in pace and contains more dialogue than previous versions, although A Problem Like Maria: Gender and Sexuality in the American Musical author Stacy Ellen Wolf believes that the teleplay borrows more from the 1957 version than Joseph Schrank's 1965 version due to sharing much of its humor, dialogue and gender politics with Hammerstein's book. Despite being more similar to the original musical than the 1965 remake in style and structure, the script's "values and tone" have been updated. The New York Daily News journalist Denene Millner observed that although the remake is "not all that different from the original", its version of Cinderella is more outspoken, the prince is more interested in finding someone he can talk to as opposed to simply "another pretty face", as well as "a hip fairy godmother who preaches self-empowerment" as a result of its "'90s flair". The remake reflected a changing society, containing themes discussing self-reliance and love. According to George Rodosthenous, author of The Disney Musical on Stage and Screen: Critical Approaches from 'Snow White' to 'Frozen', "traces of sexism" were removed from the script in favor of creating "a prince for a new era" while maintaining its "fundamental storyline"; this version of the story emphasizes that the prince has fallen in love with Cinderella because she is funny and intelligent, in addition to being beautiful. Freedman granted the prince "a democratic impulse" that drives him to spend time among the citizens of his country in the hopes of better understanding them. Cinderella and the prince are also shown meeting and developing an interest in each other prior to the ball, lessening the "love at first sight" element at the behest of the producers, by having Cinderella and the prince meet and talk to each other first, an idea that would be reused in subsequent adaptations of the story. Cinderella has a conversation with the prince in which she explains that a woman should always be treated "like a person. With kindness and respect", which some critics identified as the studio's attempt to make the film more feminist.

Cinderella was provided with a more empowering motive in that her fairy godmother reminds her that she has always been capable of bettering her own situation; she "just didn't know it" yet. According to Entertainment Weekly contributor Mary Sollosi, none of the script's dialogue requires that any of its cast or characters be white, with the film also lacking references to the races or ethnicities of the characters whatsoever. The Los Angeles Times critic Howard Rosenberg wrote that the prince's inability to recognize that some of the women trying on the glass slipper in his search for Cinderella are white as part of "what makes this Cinderella at once a rainbow and color-blind, a fat social message squeezed into a dainty, glass slipper of a fable."

=== Casting ===
Rodgers & Hammerstein's Cinderella was the first time the "Cinderella" story was adapted for a racially diverse cast, having been conceived in this format from inception. The producers hoped that the cast's diversity would enhance the film's "universal appeal" and interest children of all ethnicities. The casting directors recruited performers from various entertainment facets, spanning the Broadway, television, film and music industries. Casting the stepmother proved particularly challenging since most of the white actresses considered for the role felt uneasy about acting cruelly towards a Black Cinderella; Bette Midler was among several actresses who declined. Bernadette Peters was ultimately cast as Cinderella's stepmother, her third villainous role after portraying Lily St. Regis in the 1982 film adaptation of Annie and originating the Witch in the stage musical Into the Woods (1986). Peters' stepmother was adapted into a more comical version than previous incarnations of the character due to the actress' comedic background.

Jason Alexander was cast as the prince's valet Lionel, an entirely new character created for comic relief. Alexander accepted the role despite being paid significantly less than his Seinfeld salary because, in addition to hoping to earn Zadan and Meron's favor for the title role in a potential film adaptation of the musical Sweeney Todd: The Demon Barber of Fleet Street (1979), he hoped that Cinderella would positively impact the future of television musicals. Describing the project as both a major opportunity and responsibility, Alexander acknowledged that Cinderella's failure to succeed could potentially jeopardize the future of musical films altogether. Furthermore, Alexander insisted that Lionel be different from his Seinfeld character George Costanza, despite Freedman originally writing several in-jokes that alluded to Alexander's most famous role, prompting him to revise several of the actor's scenes accordingly. Whoopi Goldberg accepted the role of Queen Constantina because Cinderella reminded her of a period when television specials were "major event[s]" before home video made such programs available and re-watchable at virtually any time, and hoped that the film would re-introduce the tradition of watching it live and "become part of the fabric of our lives again." Goldberg found the film's colorful cast to be reflective of "who we are", describing it as "more normal" than all-Black or all-white casts. Victor Garber, who was cast as King Maximillian, also enjoyed the film's multicultural cast, describing the fact that his character has an Asian son with an African-American queen as "extraordinary". The actor concluded "There's no reason why this can't be the norm."

Casting the prince was significantly more time-consuming. Auditions were held in both Los Angeles and New York. The final actor to audition for the film, Paolo Montalban was ultimately cast as Prince Christopher in his film debut; Montalban had been an understudy in Rodgers and Hammerstein's musical The King and I at the time. Despite being late for the final day of auditions, Montalban impressed the producers with his singing voice. Montalban enjoyed this version of the prince character because "he isn't just holding out for a pretty girl ... he's looking for someone who will complete him as a person, and he finds all of those qualities in Cinderella." Company alumna Veanne Cox and television actress Natalie Desselle, respectively, were cast as Cinderella's stepsisters. Cosmopolitan's Alexis Nedd wrote that the film's final cast consisted of "Broadway stars, recording artists, relative unknowns, and bona fide entertainment superstars." Due to the well-known cast, tabloid newspapers often fabricated stories of the cast engaging in physical altercations, particularly among Brandy, Houston and Goldberg, all of which were proven false. This version of Cinderella was the first live-action fairy tale featuring color-blind casting to be broadcast on television, boasting one of the most diverse ensemble casts to appear on television at the time.

=== Music ===
Freedman's final teleplay is 11 minutes longer than previous adaptations, in turn offering several opportunities for new songs, some of which the producers felt necessary. Disney asked the Rodgers & Hammerstein Organization to be as open about changes to the musical's score as they had been about the script and cast. Music producers Chris Montan and Arif Mardin were interested in combining "Broadway legit with Hollywood pop", re-arranging the musical's original orchestration in favor of achieving a more contemporary sound by updating its rhythm and beats. Mountain, who oversees most of the music for Disney's animated films, had been interested in crossing over into live-action for several years and identified Cinderella as one of the first opportunities in which he was allowed to do so. The musicians were not interested in completely modernizing the material in the vein of the musical The Wiz (1974), opting to simply "freshen" its orchestration by incorporating contemporary rhythms, keyboards and instruments, similar to the way in which the studio approaches animated musicals. Although filmmakers are usually hesitant to interpolate songs from other sources into adaptations of Rodgers and Hammerstein's work, Ted Chapin, President of the Rodgers & Hammerstein Organization, challenged the producers to conceive "compelling reasons" as to why they should incorporate new material into the remake, allowing the filmmakers significant freedom on the condition that the additions remain consistent with the project. Three songs not featured in previous versions of the musical were added to augment the film's score, each of which was borrowed from a different Rodgers and Hammerstein source; these additions are considered to be the most dramatic of the changes made to the musical. "The Sweetest Sounds", a duet Rodgers wrote himself following Hammerstein's death for the musical No Strings (1962), was used to explore the lead couple's initial thoughts and early relationship upon meeting each other in the town square, performing separately until they are united. The filmmakers found this song particularly easy to incorporate.

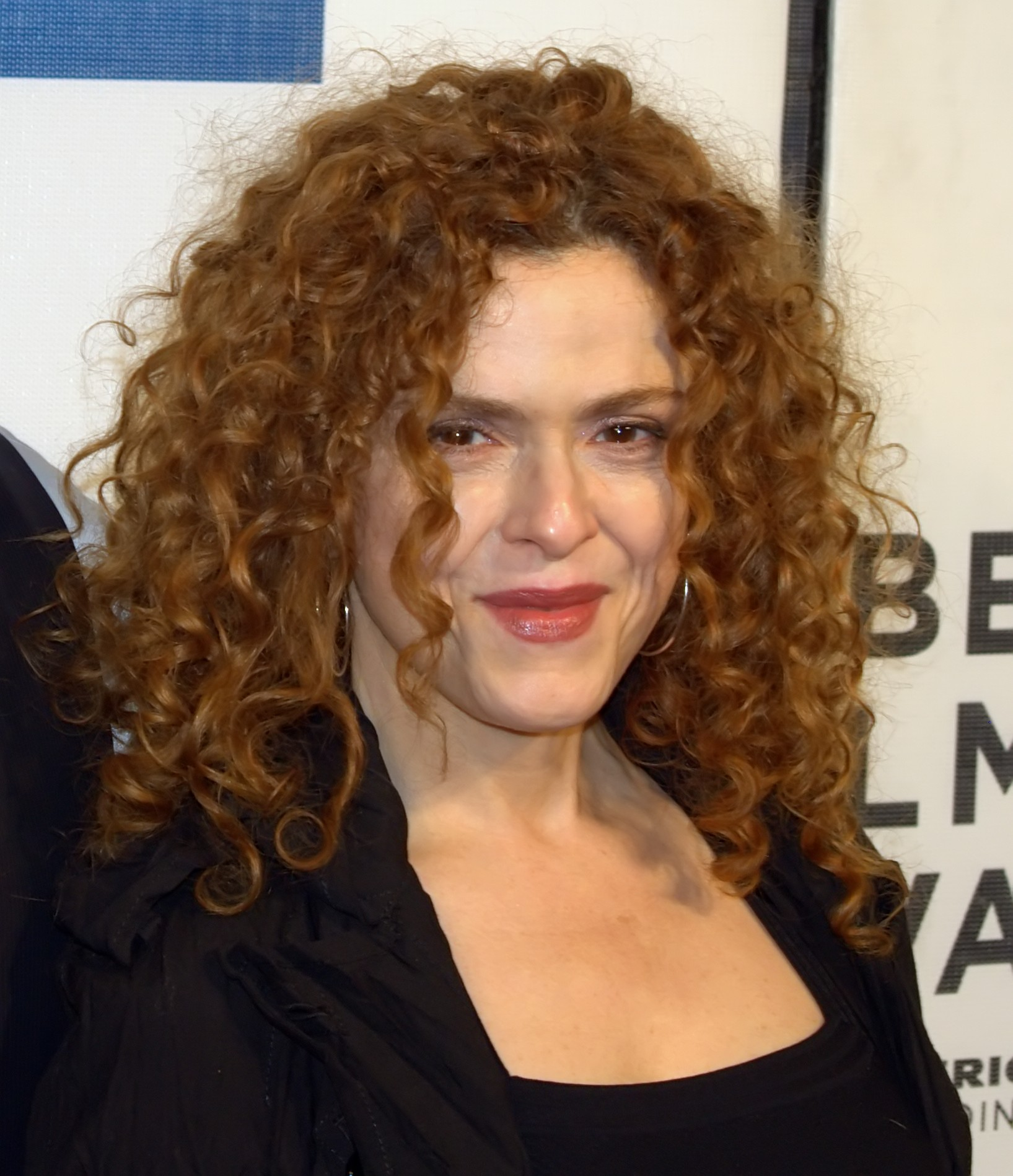
Actress Bernadette Peters portrays Cinderella's stepmother. Borrowed from the musical The Boys from Syracuse (1938), the song "Falling in Love with Love" was used in the film to both develop the Stepmother's character and provide Peters with an opportunity to use her singing voice.

"Falling in Love with Love", which Rodgers wrote with lyricist Lorenz Hart for the musical The Boys from Syracuse (1938), was adapted into a song for Cinderella's stepmother, a character who seldom sings or expresses her innermost feelings in previous adaptations of the fairy tale. She advises her own daughters about love and relationships, warning them not to confuse love with marriage. The filmmakers wanted to prove that Stepmother is not simply "an evil harridan" but rather a "product of bitter experience", for which Freedman himself suggested "Falling in Love With Love". Despite concerns that Hart's "biting" lyrics would sound too abrasive against the rest of the score, James, Hammerstein's son, was very much open to the idea. While Mary, Rodgers' daughter, was initially against using "Falling in Love With Love", she relented once Peters was cast as the Stepmother, feeling confident that the Broadway veteran was capable of "put[ting] a different kind of spin on it." The filmmakers also agreed that it would be wasteful to cast Peters without allowing her to sing. According to Peters, the song demonstrates her character's disappointment in her own life, exploring why she has grown so embittered and jealous of Cinderella. Performed while they prepare for the ball, the song was offered "a driving, up-tempo arrangement" for Peters. Although its original melody is retained, the music producers adapted the waltz into a "frenetic Latin-tinged number in duple meter" more suitable for the conniving character. The filmmakers agreed that Alexander deserved his own musical number due to his experience as a musical theatre performer, and decided to combine the Steward's "Your Majesties" with the Town Crier's "The Prince is Giving a Ball" from the original musical into an elaborate song-and-dance sequence. Broadway lyricist Fred Ebb was recruited to contribute original lyrics to the new arrangement "that melded stylistically with the Hammerstein originals." Despite the fact that Hammerstein's will states that altering his work is prohibited, James believes his father would have appreciated Ebb's contribution since the songwriter had been known to enjoy collaborating with new lyricists.

Houston's Fairy Godmother was expanded into a more musical role by having the character preface the film with a downtempo rendition of "Impossible". Describing herself as familiar with the "flavor" of Rodgers and Hammerstein's material, Houston opted to perform their songs simply as opposed to her signature pop, R&B or gospel approach. Zadan and Meron wanted Houston to end the film with a wedding song for Cinderella and Christopher. Although the producers agreed that Houston's character would sing the film's closing number, selecting a song for Houston proved a challenge. Few songs remaining in Rodgers and Hammerstein's repertoire were deemed suitable until they re-discovered "There's Music in You", a little-known song from the film Main Street to Broadway (1953), in which the songwriters play themselves. Despite being covered by singer Bing Crosby, "There's Music in You" remained obscure for 40 years until its re-discovery. The original song lacked a bridge and was deemed inferior to Houston's trademark vocals, thus it was combined with the bridge from "One Foot, Other Foot" from Rodgers and Hammerstein's musical Allegro (1947). Additionally, samples of "Impossible" and the wedding march were interpolated into its melody. Mary described the completed song as "Whitney-fied". Meron maintains that these adjustments helped the composition resemble a "Rodgers and Hammerstein song that sounds like a new Whitney Houston record". Chapin considered "There's Music in You" to be a "perfect" addition to the original score because, when combined with "The Sweetest Sounds", it "bookends Cinderella with songs about music" while demonstrating how Cinderella has matured throughout the course of the film. Mary said about the new arrangements, "I'm crazy about what they've done with the music ... They save the original sound while updating it." Rob Marshall choreographed and staged the film's musical numbers, which he credits with teaching him how to choreograph dance sequences for motion pictures. Brandy learned to waltz for the role, a task which took her two weeks to perfect. To film the "Impossible" musical sequence, Houston rode on a wooden pulley to simulate the effect that she was flying alongside Cinderella's pumpkin carriage.

Brandy found the recording process "challenging" because the film's songs were different than any material she had recorded before, explaining that she was nervous since her "voice wasn't fully developed", especially in comparison to her idol Houston and at times struggling to project. Houston would encourage the singer to "Sing from your gut" as opposed to singing from her chest in order to get her to sing louder. Goldberg, who is not primarily known as a singer, also provided her own vocals for the film, by which some of the filmmakers and cast were pleasantly surprised; Goldberg found the process somewhat difficult due to being surrounded by several professional singers, namely Houston, Brandy and Peters. The studio originally planned to release an original soundtrack featuring the film's music. However, this idea was abandoned due to conflicts between Houston and Brandy's respective record labels.

=== Filming ===
Rodgers & Hammerstein's Cinderella was the first of the three versions of the musical to be shot on film. Principal photography began on June 23, 1997, and was completed over a 28-day period, primarily on stages 22 and 26 at Sony Pictures Studios in Culver City, California, which had been the location of MGM Studios during what is now revered as "the golden age of the movie musical." With a then-unprecedented production budget of $12 million, Rodgers & Hammerstein's Cinderella is one of the most expensive television films ever made; some media publications dubbed the program "the most expensive two hours ever produced for television." In September 1997, Disney Telefilms president Charles Hirschhorn identified the film as the studio's most costly upcoming project. According to A. J. Jacobs of Entertainment Weekly, the film's budget was approximately four-times that of a typical television film. Disney granted the producers this amount because they felt confident that the film would eventually make its budget back once it was released on home video. Zadan agreed that "We've only been able to make [expensive musicals] because of the home-video component. The show loses money, and the home video [market] makes back the money that you lose." However, the film's budget is one of the lowest among the contemporary Cinderella adaptations.

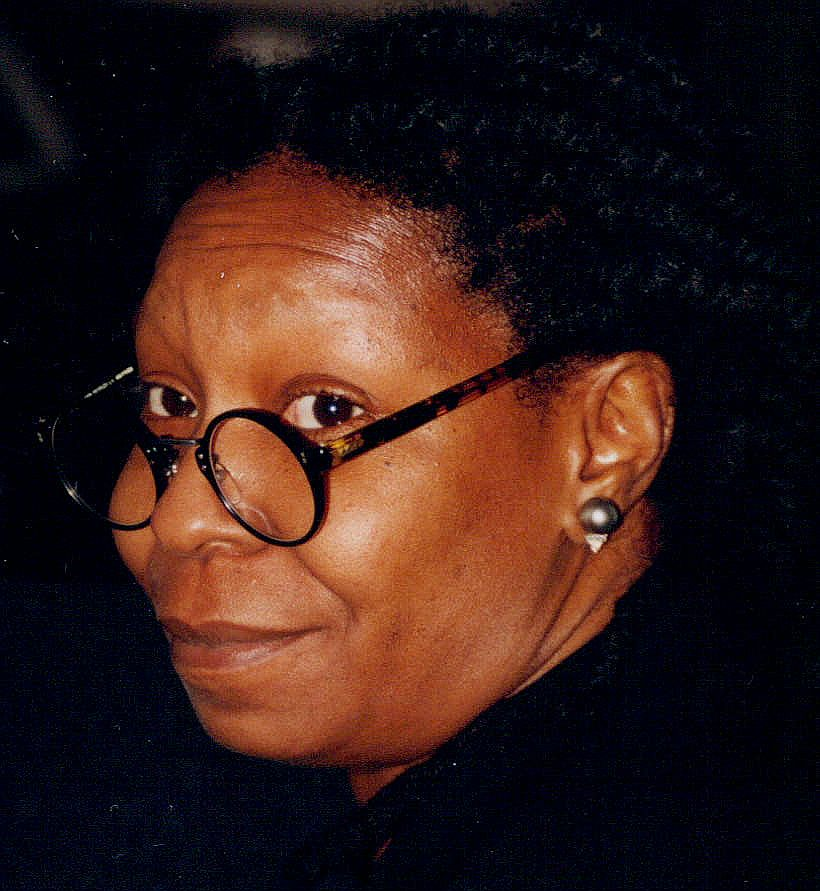
For her role as Queen Constantina, actress Whoopi Goldberg insisted that she wear real jewels as opposed to costume jewelry, enlisting jeweler Harry Winston to loan the film $60 million worth of jewelry.

The film's costumes were designed by Ellen Mirojnick, who aspired towards making them "both funny and stylish" in appearance. In order to give Cinderella's ballgown a "magical look", Mirojnick combined blue and white detailing into the dress, in addition to incorporating a peplum, a design element that had not been used in previous versions of the gown. Cinderella's "glass slippers" were made of shatterproof acrylic as opposed to glass, and only one pair was designed to fit Brandy's feet; the shoe the prince discovers and carries on a pillow in search of its owner was designed to be extremely small in order to give it the appearance of being "incredibly delicate", with Iscove describing it as "too small for any human" foot. During the 25th anniversary reunion special aired on ABC on August 23, 2022, Brandy revealed that all of the closeup shots of Cinderella's feet in the glass slippers were done by a foot model with smaller feet than her own size 9, joking that "size nine shoes look like size 12 on TV". In addition to Cinderella herself, Mirojnick costumed all female guests attending the prince's ball in various shades of blue, ranging from aqua to sapphire; Meron believes that Mirojnick's use of color in the characters' costumes distracts from the various skin colors of the film's actors. Meanwhile, the villagers' costumes range in style from "nineteenth-century peasant chic to '40s-esque brocade gowns with exploding collars, bustles, and ruffles." The costume department originally created fake jewelry for Goldberg's character, which consisted of rhinestones for her to wear during the film's ballroom and wedding sequences. However, the actress insisted that the film's queen should wear real jewelry instead and personally contacted jeweler Harry Winston to lend the production millions of dollars' worth of jewels, which ultimately included a 70-carat diamond ring and a necklace worth $9 million and $2.5 million, respectively. Winston supplied the set with three armed guards to ensure that the jewelry remained protected at all times and was safely returned at the end of filming. The Brooklyn Paper estimates that Goldberg wore approximately $60 million worth of jewelry for the film.

The film's sets were designed by Randy Ser, while art direction was headed by Ed Rubin, who opted to combine a "bright and bold" color palette with "a great deal of subtlety". Iscove identified the film's time period as "nouveau into deco," while also incorporating influences from the work of Gustav Klimt. Prince Christopher's palace was built on the same location as what had been the yellow brick road from the film The Wizard of Oz (1939), thus the palace's courtyard bricks were painted yellow in homage to the classic film. Due to the film's child-friendly message, children and family members of the cast and crew visited the set regularly, including Houston's daughter Bobbi Kristina Brown and husband Bobby Brown. Mary and James often visited, as well as Chapin. During a scheduled visit in July, approximately midway through the filming process, Mary and James previewed early footage of the film and met the cast. Hailing the sets as "the most incredible" she had ever seen, Mary described Brandy as "a sweet, wonderful young woman ... I love the fact that millions of children are going to hear her sing 'I can be whatever I want to be.' What better message could we send than that?" Towards the end of filming, the producers realized that they did not have enough money to pay for extras and additional costs, and Disney refused to loan any more money to the production. The producers agreed to finance the remainder of the project using their own money, while Goldberg volunteered to donate the rest of her daily salary to completing the production.

== Release ==
=== Marketing and premiere ===
Rodgers & Hammerstein's Cinderella was heavily promoted as the centerpiece of the newly revived Wonderful World of Disney; Disney themselves have referred to Cinderella as the "grande dame" of the anthology, while Jefferson Graham of the Chicago Sun-Times touted the film the "crown jewel" of the revival. The same newspaper reported that Cinderella was one of 16 upcoming television films commissioned for the series. One of ABC's promotional advertisements for Rodgers & Hammerstein's Cinderella featured a black-and-white scene from the original 1957 broadcast in which Andrews sings "In My Own Little Corner", which transitions into Brandy singing her more contemporary rendition of the same song, its "funkier orchestration" sounding particularly noticeable opposite Andrews' original. Rodgers & Hammerstein's Cinderella premiered on October 13, 1997, at Mann's Chinese Theatre, which Houston attended with her husband and daughter. The film's impending premiere coincided with the launch of the official Rodgers and Hammerstein website, which streamed segments from the upcoming broadcast via RealVideo from October 27 to November 3, 1997. These segments were again interpolated with excerpts from the 1957 version. A public screening of the film was hosted at the Sony Lincoln Square Theatre in New York on October 27, 1997. Most of the film's cast – Brandy, Houston, Cox, Garber, Desselle and Montalban – was present; Goldberg and Alexander were unable to attend.

=== Broadcast and viewership ===
Houston originally hoped that the film would earn a theatrical release. Rodgers & Hammerstein's Cinderella premiered on November 2, 1997, during The Wonderful World of Disney on ABC, 40 years after the original broadcast. Disney CEO Michael Eisner introduced the program. Rodgers & Hammerstein's Cinderella was a major ratings success, breaking several television records much like the original did. The telecast aired to over 60 million viewers who watched at least a portion of the film, becoming the most-watched television musical in several years and earning more viewership than 1993's Gypsy. According to the Nielsen ratings, Cinderella averaged a 22.3 rating and 31 share (although it was originally estimated that the program had earned only an 18.8 rating), which is believed to have been bolstered by the film's strong appeal towards women and adults between the ages of 18 and 49. Translated, this means that 31 percent of televisions in the United States aired the premiere, while 23 million different households tuned in to the broadcast. Surprisingly, 70 percent of Cinderella's total viewership that evening consisted of females under the age of 18, specifically ages two to 11. The broadcast attracted a particularly high number of younger audience members, including children, teenagers and young adults, in turn making Cinderella the television season's most popular family show.

In addition to being the most-watched program of the evening, Cinderella remained the most-watched program of the entire week, scoring higher ratings than the consistently popular shows ER and Seinfeld. The film became ABC's most-watched Sunday night program in more than 10 years, as well as the most-watched program during the network's two-hour 7:00 pm to 9:00 pm time slot in 13–14 years, a record it broke within its first hour of airing. AllMusic biographer Steve Huey attributes the film's high ratings to its "star power and integrated cast". Additionally, the popularity of Cinderella boosted the ratings of ABC's television film Before Women Had Wings, which premiered immediately following the program and consequently earned a rating of 19, retaining much of its viewership from Cinderella's broadcast. ABC's chief researcher Larry Hyams recalled that few "predicted the magnitude of Cinderella's numbers". On February 14, 1999 (Valentine's Day), ABC re-aired the film, which was watched by 15 million viewers. According to Ashley Lee of the Los Angeles Times, Cinderella was the most profitable television film of its time.

Fuse broadcast Rodgers & Hammerstein's Cinderella on November 2, 2017, in honor of the film's 20th anniversary, naming the television special A Night Of Magic: 20th Anniversary of Rodgers & Hammerstein's Cinderella. The network also aired "Cinderella"-themed episodes of Brandy's sitcom Moesha and the sitcom Sister, Sister in commemoration.

ABC aired Rodgers & Hammerstein's Cinderella on August 23, 2022, for the film's 25th anniversary, following Cinderella: The Reunion, A Special Edition of 20/20. 1.5 million viewers watched.

=== Home media ===
Shortly after the film's premiere, audiences soon began demanding a swift home video release, which the studio soon began bringing to fruition. Rodgers and Hammerstein's Cinderella was released on VHS February 10, 1998, a mere 101 days after premiere. This became the highest-selling home video release of any made-for-television film at that time, selling one million copies its first week. By February 1999, the video had sold more than two million copies. According to Zadan, musical films struggled to sell well on home video until Cinderella was released. The film was released on DVD on February 4, 2003. In July 2020, fans and Brandy herself began heavily petitioning on social media to have the film added to the streaming service Disney+, which currently streams several other Disney-produced film versions of the fairy tale. On February 4, 2021, Brandy announced on The View that the film would be released on Disney+ on February 12, 2021.

== Reception ==
=== Critical response ===
Playbill's Rebecca Paller reviewed the New York screening as "overflowing with star performances, lavish sets" and "lush rainbow-hued costumes", describing its score as "fresher than ever." According to Paller, the screening resembled a Broadway tryout more than a film preview since the audience reportedly applauded at the end of every song. Praising its sets, costumes, choreography and script, Paller concluded "everything about the TV play worked", predicting that both young and adult audiences will find the program memorable. Although well received by audiences, Cinderella premiered to generally mixed reviews from most critics, who were critical of some of its songs, cast and feminist approach, at times deeming it inferior to the 1957 and 1965 versions. Some purist fans were less impressed with the contemporary arrangements of Rodgers and Hammerstein's original music. Critics have softened towards the film over time, which has earned 86% on review aggregate Rotten Tomatoes.

Praising its score and faithfulness to the source material, Eileen Fitzpatrick of Billboard called the film a "sure to please" remake while lauding Brandy's performance, joking that the singer "slips into the Rodgers and Hammerstein Broadway-like score as easily as Cinderella fits into the glass slipper". Fitzpatrick went on to write that the supporting cast lacks "a weak link" entirely, finding it obvious that Houston enjoyed her material and commending the contributions of Peters, Alexander, Goldberg, Garber, Cox and Deselle. New York entertainment critic John Leonard praised the cast extensively, highlighting the performance of Brandy whom the writer said possesses "the grace to transfigure inchoate youth into adult agency" while complimenting the work of Houston, Montalban, Peters, Goldberg and Alexander, the latter of whom the critic identified as a reminder "that he belonged to musical theater before he ever shacked up with Seinfeld's slackers." Leonard also praised the actors' musical performances, particularly Peters' "Falling in Love with Love", but admitted that he prefers the songs used in Disney's 1950 animated adaptation of the fairy tale. In addition to receiving praise for its overall craftsmanship and musical format, critics appreciated the film's color-blind cast. Describing the film as "Short, sweet and blindingly brightly colored", TV Guide film critic Maitland McDonagh wrote that Cinderella is "overall ... a pleasant introduction to a classic musical, tweaked to catch the attention of contemporary youngsters." McDonagh observed that the color-blindness of the entire cast spares the film from potentially suffering "disturbing overtones" that otherwise could have resulted from images of an African-American Cinderella being mistreated by her Caucasian stepmother. Despite calling the supporting cast "unusually strong", the critic felt Brandy and Houston acted too much like their own selves for their performances to be considered truly compelling.

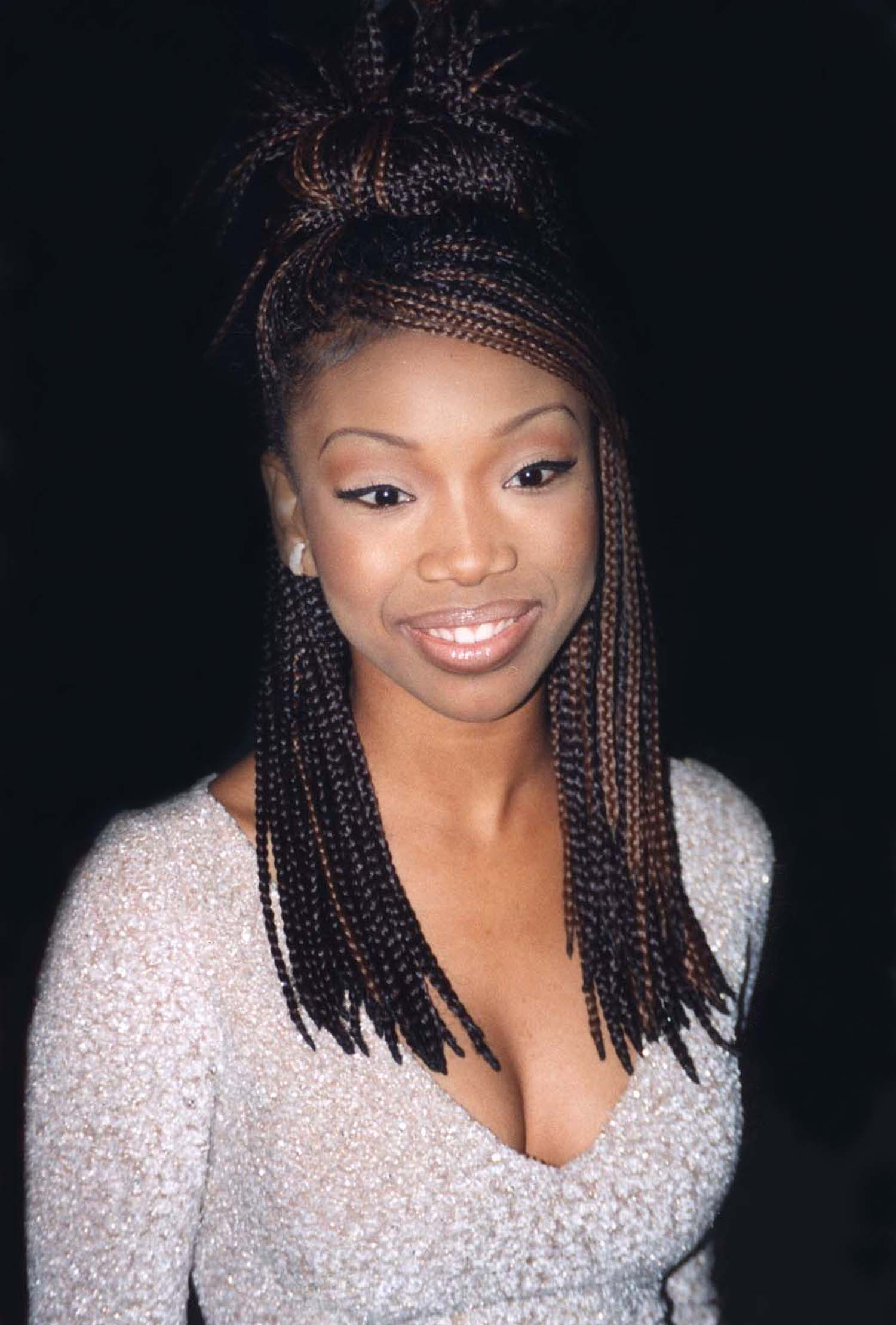
Singer Brandy (pictured in 1997) was the first Black actress to play the role of Cinderella on-screen.

Teresa Talerico, writing for Common Sense Media, praised the film's costumes, sets and musical numbers while lauding Peters, Goldberg and Houston's performances, but found the choreography stiff. In a mixed review, The New York Times journalist Caryn James found the film's multi-racial cast and incorporation of stronger Rodgers and Hammerstein material improve Cinderella overall, but admitted the production fails to "take that final leap into pure magic", dismissing it as "a cobbled-together 'Cinderella' for the moment, not the ages." While lauding Brandy and Montalban's efforts, James described the film's feminist re-writes as "clumsy" and accused it of wasting Houston's talent. Matthew Gilbert of The Boston Globe complained that despite its "visual charm" and strong performances, the film lacks "romance, warmth, and a bit of snap in the dance department", failing to become "anything more than a slight TV outing that feels more Nickelodeon than Broadway." Describing the film as "big, gaudy, miles over the top and loads of fun", Variety's Ray Richmond found some of its aspects distracting and opined that the entire project "could have been toned down a notch and still carried across plenty of the requisite spunk." While praising Brandy's subtlety, Richmond found Houston's interpretation of the Fairy Godmother to be an overzealous, "frightening caricature, one certain to send the kids scurrying into Mom's lap for reassurance that the good woman will soon go away." Similarly, television critic Ken Tucker, writing for Entertainment Weekly, praised Brandy and Alexander but found that Houston "strikes a wrong note as a sassy, vaguely hostile Fairy Godmother" while dismissing Montalban as "a drearily bland prince" and describing most of the musical numbers as "clunky", predicting that children "will sleep through" the film.

Although Houston and Brandy's on-screen pairing was highly anticipated, the supporting cast of Peters, Goldberg and Alexander ultimately garnered most of the program's praise. Television critic Howard Rosenberg, in a review for the Los Angeles Times, described Brandy's singing as superior to her acting, resulting in "a tender, fresh Cinderella". Attributing most of the "magic" to Alexander, Peters and Goldberg, Rosenberg was unimpressed with Montalban and Houston, who he described as "pastel as a prince can get (although it's not his fault the character is written as a doofus)" and "not much of a fairy godmother", respectively. For Entertainment Weekly, Denise Lanctot praised the musical numbers and choreography but found Brandy's performance underwhelming, describing it as "oddly vacuous" and "Barbie-doll blank" while criticizing her singing. However, she called Montalban "perfectly charming" and "The real fairy tale". Despite praising Houston, Montalban, Alexander and Peters, People's Terry Kelleher found Brandy's vocals inferior to Houston's and "lack[ing] the vocal command and emotive power to" support the film's ballads. Harlene Ellin of the Chicago Tribune wrote that, despite its aesthetics and color-blind casting, the film "lacks the requisite charm and spark", concluding that the production "doesn't capture the heart" despite its beauty. While praising the performances of Houston, Peters and Montalban, Ellin joked that "Cinderella's glass slippers are far too big for Brandy", criticizing her acting while saying that the singer "delivers her lines so timidly and flatly that it's hard to stay focused on the story when Brandy is on the screen", concluding that her co-stars "only makes her weak acting all the more glaring", and causing her to wonder how the film would have turned out had Houston been cast as the lead instead. The Oxford Handbook of The American Musical editor Raymond Knapp believes that Brandy's sitcom experience negatively affected her acting, writing that she often overreacts and delivers lines "as if they were punch lines rather than emotionally generated phrases." Theater director Timothy Sheader found the production "harsh and unmagical". In 2007, theatre historian John Kenrick dismissed the film as "a desecration of Rodgers & Hammerstein's only original TV musical" despite its popularity, advising audiences to only watch the previous versions of the musical. In its year-end edition, TV Guide ranked the program the best television special of 1997.

The diversity of the cast prompted some members of the media to dub the film "rainbow 'Cinderella'", Laurie Winer of the Los Angeles Times summarized that the film's cast "is not just rainbow, it's over the rainbow", observing that "the black [sic] queen (Goldberg) and white king (Victor Garber), for instance, produce a prince played by Filipino Paolo Montalban" while "Cinderella withstands the company of a white stepsister (Veanne Cox) and a black [sic] one (Natalie Desselle), both, apparently, birth daughters of the mother played by Bernadette Peters." A writer for Newsweek believed that Brandy's Cinderella falling in love with a non-Black prince reflects "a growing loss of faith in black [sic] men by many black [sic] women", explaining, "Just as Brandy's Cinderella falls in love with a prince of another color, so have black [sic] women begun to date and marry interracially in record numbers." The Sistahs' Rules author Denene Millner was less receptive towards the fact that Brandy's Cinderella falls in love with a non-Black prince, arguing, "When my stepson who's 5 looks at that production, I want him to know he can be somebody's Prince Charming."

=== Awards and nominations ===
The film received several accolades. Rodgers & Hammerstein's Cinderella was nominated for seven Primetime Emmy Awards, including Outstanding Variety, Music or Comedy Special. At the 50th Primetime Emmy Awards in 1998, the film was also nominated for Outstanding Art Direction for a Variety or Music Program, Outstanding Choreography, Outstanding Costume Design for a Variety or Music Program, Outstanding Directing for a Variety or Music Program, Outstanding Hairstyling for a Miniseries, Movie or a Special, and Outstanding Music Direction, ultimately winning one for Outstanding Art Direction for a Variety or Music Program, which was awarded to Julie Kaye Fanton, Edward L. Rubin and Randy Ser. Rodgers & Hammerstein's Cinderella was the 13th most nominated program at that year's ceremony.

The film also won an Art Directors Guild Award for Excellence in Production Design – Awards Show, Variety, Music, or Non-Fiction Program, awarded to Ser. Freedman's teleplay was nominated for a Writers Guild of America Award for Best Children's Script. Rodgers & Hammerstein's Cinderella was nominated for three NAACP Image Awards, including Outstanding Television Movie, Mini-Series or Dramatic Special, while both Brandy and Goldberg were nominated for an NAACP Image Award for Outstanding Lead Actress in a Television Movie or Mini-Series. Peters was nominated for a Satellite Award for Best Performance by an Actress in a Supporting Role in a Mini-Series or Motion Picture Made for Television, while Alexander was nominated for Best Performance by an Actor in a Supporting Role in a Mini-Series or Motion Picture Made for Television.

20/20: Cinderella: The Reunion was nominated for an Emmy at the 44th News and Documentary Emmy Awards.

== Legacy ==
ABC began discussing the possibility of Disney producing more musical films for the network shortly after Cinderella's premiere, originally commissioning its producers to develop similar musicals to broadcast every November. Bill Carter of The New York Times predicted that the success of the broadcast "will mean more musicals for television, probably as early as" 1998. Similarly, Bert Fink of the Rodgers & Hammerstein Organization said that the program's ratings will most likely "have a salubrious effect on" the future of television musicals. Hirschhorn interpreted the film's success as an indication that "there is a huge family audience out there for quality programming," expressing interest in eventually "fill[ing] in the ground between feature animated musicals and Broadway". Cinderella's producers immediately began researching other musical projects to adapt for the Wonderful World of Disney, with the network originally hoping to produce at least one similar television special per year, announcing that songwriter Stephen Schwartz had already begun writing a musical adaptation of Pinocchio.

In his book The Cambridge Companion to the Musical, author Nicholas Everett identified Rodgers & Hammerstein's Cinderella among important television musicals that "renewed interest in the genre" during the 1990s, with Playbill recognizing it as "the resurgence of televised movie musicals". According to Zadan, Cinderella's success "helped secure a future for musicals in the 'Wonderful World of Disney' slot", whose film company Storyline Entertainment started developing new musicals for the series shortly afterward, including Annie (1999). Although the stage musical Annie had already been adapted as a film in 1982, the film was considered to be a critical and commercial failure. Inspired by the success of Cinderella, Zadan and Meron saw remaking the musical as an opportunity to rectify the previous adaptation's errors. They enlisted Cinderella's choreographer Rob Marshall to direct and making the orphans ethnically diverse. According to Vulture.com entertainment critic Matt Zoller Seitz, both productions "stood out for their lush production values, expert control of tone, and ahead-of-the-curve commitment to diverse casting." However, the Los Angeles Times' Brian Lowry observed that few of the series' subsequent projects achieved the ratings that Cinderella had, with viewership for later programming being rather inconsistent.

Following the success of the film, the Rodgers & Hammerstein Organization and Disney discussed possibly adapting the production into a touring stage musical by 2001, but the idea never materialized. Various elements from Freedman's script were incorporated into the 2000 national tour of Cinderella, which is considered to be the first time the musical was adapted into a legitimate Broadway-style production. A Broadway adaptation of the musical premiered in 2013, in which several songs from the 1997 film are re-used, including "There's Music in You". Additionally, Montalban has reprised his role as the prince in both regional and touring productions of Cinderella, some of which have been directly based on or inspired by the 1997 film.

Despite its initial reception, Cinderella has become widely revered as a classic, and one of the best film adaptations of the fairy tale. The Daily Telegraph deemed the 1997 adaptation "The final of the trio of classic Cinderella remakes". Both Polygon and Mashable named 1997's Cinderella the best version of the story, while Entertainment Tonight ranked the film the third greatest adaptation of the fairy tale. CinemaBlend ranked the film the fourth most charming film adaptation. Highlighting the performances of Montalban, Peters and Houston, Entertainment Weekly ranked Rodgers & Hammerstein's Cinderella the fourth greatest adaptation of the fairy tale, ahead of both the 1965 (10th) and 1957 (sixth) versions, with author Mary Sollosi calling it one of "the 11 best-known film adaptations of the tale". In 2017, Shondaland.com crowned the film "one of the most inclusive, expensive ... and ultimately beloved TV movies of all time." Den of Geek ranked the film the second best "Cinderella" adaptation, describing it as "the first time the story truly felt magical" and writing "Almost twenty-five years later, this adaptation still feels like the television event it was when it premiered." On February 11, 2021, the day prior to the film's premiere on Disney+, Entertainment Weekly held a virtual reunion with the surviving principal cast members. In August 2022, the cast once again reunited for a television special Cinderella: The Reunion, A Special Edition of 20/20, which was followed by an airing of the film, the first time it has aired on broadcast television in over two decades.

=== Cultural significance ===
Rodgers and Hammerstein's Cinderella is considered to be a "groundbreaking" film due to its diverse cast, particularly casting a Black actress as Cinderella. Following its success, Disney had considered adapting the fairy tale "Sleeping Beauty" into a Latin musical set in Spain, but the idea never materialized. Brandy is considered to be the first African-American to play Cinderella on-screen. Newsweek opined that Brandy's casting proved that "the idea of a black [sic] girl playing the classic Cinderella was [not] unthinkable", calling it "especially significant because" Disney's 1950 film "sent a painful message that only white women could be princesses". Fans have affectionately nicknamed the film "the Brandy Cinderella". Brandy's performance earned her the titles "the first Cinderella of color", "the first black [sic] Cinderella" and "the first African-American princess" by various media publications, while Shondaland.com contributor Kendra James dubbed Brandy "Disney's first black [sic] princess", crowning her the Cinderella of the 1990s. James concluded, "for a generation of young children of color, 'Cinderella' became an iconic memory of their childhoods, of seeing themselves in a black [sic] princess". Similar to the film, the stage adaptation has consistently utilized color-blind casting. In 2014, actress Keke Palmer was cast as Cinderella on Broadway, becoming the first Black actress to play the role on Broadway. Palmer also credited Brandy with allowing her the opportunity.

Ruthie Fierberg of Playbill said Brandy's performance "immortalized the role on screen", while Hollywood.com's Jeremy Rodriguez ranked her the seventh-best Cinderella interpretation. Fuse TV dubbed Brandy's Cinderella "arguably the most groundbreaking portrayal at time" for inspiring subsequent diverse portrayals of the character. Essence's Deena Campbell credited the singer with "inspiring other young girls to be black [sic] Cinderellas". Media criticism professor Venise Berry found Brandy's casting and performance to be a "wonderful opportunity to reflect the true diversity in our society", writing, "I think that Brandy will help African-American females see there are other possibilities that their lives can blossom into something good, and you don't have to be white for that to happen," in turn making the classic story more accessible "to little black girls" who had believed that ascending into a life of privilege was only possible for white people. Writing for Nylon, Taylor Bryant called the film both "An Underrated Classic" and "One of the most important moments in [film] history". Applauding the film for providing minorities with "the chance to see themselves depicted as royalty for perhaps the first time", Bryant identified Brandy as a princess for Black girls to "fawn" over, which Disney would not revisit until The Princess and the Frog (2009). Similarly, Martha Tesema wrote in an article for Mashable that "seeing Brandy as Cinderella on screen was groundbreaking" having "grown up in a time where future Disney characters like Tiana did not exist and the reason why didn't cross my mind—until this Cinderella. Seeing a princess with box braids like mine and a fairy godmother like Whitney ... gave me and girls who looked like me a glimpse at an early age of why it is necessary to demand representation of all types of people playing all types of roles in films." Ashley Rey, a writer for Bustle, opined that the film "helped show the world that black and brown faces should have just as much of a presence in fairytale land as white faces do."

Martha Tesema, a writer for Mashable, called the film "the best live-action princess remake", writing that it "deserves just as much praise now as it did then." Tesema credits its ethnic diversity with making the film as "enchanting" as it is, continuing that the production "invites you to accept these [characters' races] as just the way they are for a little over an hour and it's a beautiful phenomenon". Furthermore, the writer opined that future live-action remakes should watch Cinderella for reference. In an article for HuffPost, contributor Isabelle Khoo argued that despite the constant remakes that Hollywood produces "no fairy tale adaptation has been more important than Rodgers and Hammerstein's 'Cinderella.'", citing its diverse cast, combating of sexist stereotypes often depicted in other Disney films, and empowering themes that encourage children to make their own dreams come true as opposed to simply "keep on believing" among "three important reasons the 1997 version has maintained relevance today." Khoo observed that the film continues to be constantly praised in social media by fans who had grown up with the film for its diversity, concluding, "With so much talk about the lack of diversity in Hollywood these days, Rodgers and Hammerstein's 'Cinderella' is a shining example of the diversity we need." Similarly, Elle writer R. Eric Thomas crowned Cinderella "One of the Most Important Movies of the '90s". Describing it as "effortlessly, even unintentionally, progressive", Thomas wrote that the film "forecast a world with far more possibility; it's a film made for the future." Crediting the film with establishing both Brandy and Houston as "icons", the writer concluded that Cinderella teaches "about the limitless nature of storytelling. That in stories, there are no constraints; the only limit is your imagination. And once you learn that, you don't unlearn it", representing its theme that nothing is impossible. Mandy Len Catron, author of How to Fall in Love with Anyone: A Memoir in Essays, believes that the film remains "The only truly diverse version of the fairy tale" as of 2017. Ashley Lee of the Los Angeles Times declared Cinderella "the best example of colorblind casting of a screen musical to date" which "offers a useful template for potential successors", concluding, "the creatives behind Hollywood's current movie-musical boom could learn a thing or two from its clever spin on a classic text."

Brandy and Montalban reprise the roles as Cinderella and King Charming in the Disney+ film Descendants: The Rise of Red, part of the Descendants franchise, as versions of the characters based on the 1950 Cinderella film, and again in the sequel Descendants: Wicked Wonderland.

== See also ==
- Cinderella, Rodgers and Hammerstein's original 1957 television musical on which the film is based, starring Julie Andrews in the title role
- Cinderella, Disney's 1950 animated musical adaption of the fairy tale
- Cindy, ABC's 1978 re-imagining of the Cinderella fairy tale featuring an all-Black cast
- Descendants: The Rise of Red, Disney+ film in which Brandy and Montalban also play versions of Cinderella and Prince Charming
