= Let Yourself be Loved =

Single by Diamond Carter

from the album Pink Balloon
- Released: September 2012
- Genre: Indie Rock
- Length: 3:34(single)
- Songwriters: John Stamos; Tyler Tuohy; Michael Gigante
- Producer: Michael Gigante

“Let Yourself be Loved” is a song by indie rock band Diamond Carter. The song was featured on the band’s first album entitled Pink Balloon, released in September 2012. It was co-written by Diamond Carter’s front man, Tyler Tuohy, the band's producer, Michael Gigante and John Stamos, who also directed the song’s music video in March of 2014.

The video stars Tuohy alongside Nicky Whelan and was released as a feature music video on Yahoo! Music May 14, 2014. This was the first music video Stamos had recorded since “Hot Fun in the Summertime” with The Beach Boys in the early 1990s. The video received Twitter recognition from artists such as John Stamos, Howard Stern, Lori Loughlin, Amanda Cerny and Matt Sorum.

== Origins ==
Not wanting to forget the idea of the song, along with the lyrics “Let yourself be loved,” Stamos recorded himself singing the line and humming the tune one night before going to bed. He later contacted his friend, Michael Gigante, about his recording and Gigante put him in touch with Tuohy from Diamond Carter. Together the three finished the song, adding music, verses and the rest of the chorus to what would be Diamond Carter’s first radio single.

Stamos says the song focuses on “being blocked and not letting people in,” while for Tuohy, the song tells a more specific story about a broken yet beautiful relationship. In Tuohy’s words, “when it was good it was really good, but when it was bad it was really, really bad.” The day Diamond Carter recorded “Let Yourself be Loved” for Pink Balloon was the day the relationship ended. The climactic event was so impactful for Tuohy as an artist, the music video for the song was shot in the same studio the breakup occurred, mirroring the events that took place that day. For Tuohy, the song shows evidence of misconstrued bliss that seems relevant at the beginning of a relationship, but loses dignity once intimacy is the only thing left to supersede solidarity.
