= Lucy (2003 film) =

TV movie about Lucille Ball

- Film advertisement
- Genre: Biography; Comedy-drama
- Written by: Katie Ford; T. S. Cook
- Directed by: Glenn Jordan
- Starring: Rachel York; Danny Pino; Ann Dowd; LaChanze; Madeline Zima
- Music by: Bruce Broughton
- Country of origin: United States
- Original language: English

Production
- Executive producers: Glenn Jordan; Craig Zadan; Neil Meron
- Producer: Dave Mace
- Cinematography: James Bartle
- Editor: David Simmons
- Running time: 128 minutes
- Production companies: Storyline Entertainment; Sony Pictures Television

Original release
- Network: CBS
- Release: May 4, 2003

Lucy is a 2003 American biographical comedy-drama television film directed by Glenn Jordan and written by Katie Ford and T. S. Cook. It is based on the life and career of actress and comedian Lucille Ball, and her turbulent relationship with her husband and co-star Desi Arnaz. It stars Rachel York as Ball and Danny Pino as Arnaz, with Ann Dowd, LaChanze, and Madeline Zima in supporting roles.

The film premiered on May 4, 2003, on CBS.

== Plot ==
In 1960, moments before filming the final episode of The Lucy-Desi Comedy Hour, Lucille Ball and Desi Arnaz send scathing messages to each other through a pageboy. Co-stars Vivian Vance and William Frawley comment on the tense situation, but everyone puts on their best front as Desi introduces them for the final time and Lucy emerges to a warm welcome from the studio audience.

In 1925, a young Lucille lives with her family in Celoron, New York. Her desire to be a performer prompts her to enroll in acting school, where encounters with a condescending Bette Davis and an unreceptive acting coach result in her quitting. Shortly after, Lucy's grandfather is sued by the family of a neighborhood boy who was accidentally shot and paralyzed by someone target shooting under his supervision. Left penniless by the lawsuit, Lucy and her family move into an apartment in Jamestown. She finds work as a model and a cigarette girl in New York City before landing a job as a Goldwyn Girl and eventually moving to Hollywood to pursue a film career.

After earning several minor roles as a contract player for RKO Radio Pictures, she befriends Carole Lombard, convinces the rest of her family to move to California, hires an African-American maid named Harriet and develops a romantic relationship with fellow contract player Desi Arnaz before eloping with him in November 1940. Lucy later signs with Metro-Goldwyn-Mayer and stars alongside comedian Red Skelton in Du Barry Was a Lady. Meanwhile, rumors of Desi being unfaithful put a strain on their marriage, which is further strained following a devastating miscarriage. After being released from MGM, Lucy meets silent movie legend Buster Keaton, who is convinced of her talent as a clown and takes her under his wing. Her comedic skills further gestate on the radio program My Favorite Husband, which leaves her more convinced of her comedic abilities.

Gathering the radio team together, the idea for I Love Lucy is formed and pitched to CBS. When studio executives prove to be skeptical of the public's readiness, Lucy sets out to prove them wrong by performing several comedy routines. The network gives in but remains convinced that the show will flop. It proves to be a huge success, remaining a fan favorite for six years and forever changing the shape of television. The couple build their studio, Desilu Productions, from the ground up, and are hailed as pioneers in television. However, as their empire grows, Lucy and Desi's marriage quickly deteriorates due to his alcoholism and womanizing, and her commitment to her craft. The two decide it would be best if they end their marriage.

In the present day, moments after the filming ends, Lucy and Desi hold hands as they leave the studio, content with remaining friends and proud of what they have accomplished.

== Production ==
The film was shot in and around Auckland, New Zealand, and featured many New Zealand actors in supporting roles.

== Cast ==
- Rachel York as Lucille Ball
  - Madeline Zima as Teen Lucy
- Danny Pino as Desi Arnaz
- Ann Dowd as DeDe Hunt-Ball
- LaChanze as Harriett
- Rebecca Hobbs as Vivian Vance
- Merv Smith as Fred Hunt
- Russell Newman as William Frawley
- Zoe Carides as Lolita De Acha
- Chris Brougham as Fred Ball
- Ray Woolf as Edward Sedgwick
- Peter Mochrie as Don Sharpe
- Andrew Mitchell as Bob Carroll Jr.
- Lachlan MacDonald as Jess Oppenheimer
- Theresa Healey as Madelyn Pugh
- Mark Clare as Red Skelton
- Vanessa Gray as Carole Lombard
- Ian Mune as Buster Keaton
- Bart John as Hubbell Robinson
- Charles Pierard as Alexander Hall (uncredited)
- Peter Rowley as Marc Daniels (uncredited)
- Priscilla Bonnet as Bette Davis
- Laurie Dee as Congressman Jackson
- Charles Unwin as Clark Gable (uncredited)
- Madeline Kofoed as Lucie Arnaz (uncredited)

== Historical inaccuracies ==
- Desi Arnaz tells the audience that the night's episode would be the final episode of The Lucy–Desi Comedy Hour, but the show was not given this title until it entered syndication; during its original run, it was known as The Lucille Ball-Desi Arnaz Show. In addition, due to tensions on the set, the final season was taped without a studio audience.
- Harriett is a composite character based on several maids Lucille had over the years, and also takes the place of her cousin, Cleo Morgan.
- In the first flashback scene, the establishing shot of Celoron Park, as well as the on-screen subtitle are both misspelled as "Celeron Park" and "Celeron, New York,1925" respectively.
- Lucille suffers only one miscarriage instead of three.
- Jess Oppenheimer is portrayed as being hired specifically to produce I Love Lucy, ignoring his involvement with My Favorite Husband beginning in 1948.
- Grape is shown as being a Jell-O flavor, when at the time only six flavors - strawberry, raspberry, cherry, orange, lemon, and lime - existed in 1949.
- The I Love Lucy set omits the Ricardo's bedroom and has the first scene from "Lucy Thinks Ricky Is Trying to Murder Her" be the kitchen scene with Ethel.
- The second season Tropicana set is shown to be in use during production of the first season.
- The Ricardos' wall is painted light blue instead of pale pink.
- The "Pioneer Women" "13 cakes" conversation takes place in the living room set instead of the kitchen.
- The Ricardos' second apartment is not used; the film shows the first one as lasting the entire series.
- The revelation of Lucille's communist ties comes after the filming of season three's "Lucy is Envious", when in reality the news broke prior to the filming of the first episode that season, "The Girls Go Into Business".
- Lucy & Desi discuss buying RKO in 1953 during the red scare, when it did not hit the market until around 1957.
- The film shows Marc Daniels being the sole director, and Bob Carroll, Jr. and Madelyn Davis as the only writers. In reality, Daniels left after the first season, being replaced by William Asher, James Kern, and Jerry Thorpe. Bob Schiller and Bob Weiskopf joined the series in the fifth season, while Carroll, Jr. and Davis left after the first season of The Lucy-Desi Comedy Hour.
- The Arnaz family is shown moving out of the ranch and onto Roxbury Drive in 1958, when actually they moved in 1954.
- "Lucy Meets the Moustache" was not filmed before a live audience in reality. The filming also occurred on March 2, 1960, not in February.
- The final scene of "Lucy Meets the Moustache" takes place in the Connecticut living room instead of Ernie Kovacs' hotel room.
- The Connecticut house is shortened, omitting a portion of the wall between the fireplace and the front door, plus the kitchen door. There is also no door or balcony at the top of the stairs. In addition, the location of the other side door is changed in order to consolidate the set.
- The depiction of Ball and Arnaz holding hands at the end of the film would be unlikely given the animosity between the two at the time. Ball and Arnaz rekindled a friendship in the years following their divorce and remarriages.

== Cut Scenes ==
Following its release on Amazon Prime, nearly 30 minutes worth of scenes from the film have been cut or reduced. Such as Lucy's time at acting school with Bette Davis, her scenes with Carole Lombard, and her being accused of being a communist were removed from syndication.
