= Neil Meron =

American film and television producer

- Born: October 26, 1955 (age 71); Brooklyn, New York
- Education: Brooklyn College
- Occupations: film and television producer
- Years active: 1989 – present

Neil Meron (born October 26, 1955) is an American film producer known for producing the film adaptations of Chicago and Hairspray. With partner Craig Zadan he ran the production company Storyline Entertainment until Zadan's death in 2018. Meron continues to run the company.

== Life and career ==
Meron, born in Brooklyn, New York, attended Samuel J. Tilden High School in the same borough and Brooklyn College, graduating in 1976. He is Jewish. He became Zadan's assistant with the duo working for Joseph Papp at the Public Theater in the 1970s. They formed the production company "Storyline Entertainment", producing films and television features. He is openly gay.

Back, from Storyline Entertainment and CBS Paramount Network, is a 2009 CBS television pilot which centers on a man (portrayed by Skeet Ulrich) who disappeared in the wake of the 9/11 terrorist attacks- but who suddenly shows up, eight years later. The story was to follow the man as he reconnects with his family and adjusts to a world that has dramatically changed. Dean Widenmann wrote the project and was to serve as supervising producer, while Storyline's Zadan and Meron were Executive Producers.

He and Craig Zadan have produced the 85th, 86th and 87th Oscar telecasts.

== Filmography ==
- If Looks Could Kill (1991)
- Gypsy (1993) (TV)
- Twists of Terror (1997) (TV) Executive Producer
- Cinderella (1997)
- Annie (1999)
- Chicago (2002)
- Lucy (2003)
- The Music Man (2003) (TV)
- It's All Relative (2004) (TV, 11 episodes)
- 16th Annual GLAAD Media Awards (2005) (TV)
- Wedding Wars (2006) (TV)
- The Bucket List (2007)
- Hairspray (2007)
- Living Proof (2008)
- A Raisin in the Sun (2008) (TV)
- Drop Dead Diva (2009) (TV)
- Footloose (2011)
- Smash (2012) (TV)
- Steel Magnolias (2012) (TV)
- Bonnie and Clyde: Dead and Alive (2013) (TV)
- The Sound of Music Live! (2013) (TV)
- Peter Pan Live! (2014) (TV)
- The Wiz Live! (2015) (TV)
- Hairspray Live! (2016) (TV)
- Jesus Christ Superstar Live in Concert (2018) (TV)
- Annie Live! (2021) (TV)
- 13 (2022)

== Awards and nominations ==
In 2008, Zadan and Meron were awarded the Career Achievement Award by the Casting Society of America. He has been nominated for the Emmy Award eight times, along with his co-executive producer Zadan (and the respective producers).
