= Wedding Wars =

- DVD cover
- Written by: Stephen Mazur
- Directed by: Jim Fall
- Starring: John Stamos; Eric Dane; Bonnie Somerville; James Brolin; Sean Maher
- Music by: Mervyn Warren
- Country of origin: United States
- Original language: English

Production
- Executive producers: Neil Meron; Craig Zadan
- Producer: Michael Mahoney
- Cinematography: Ron Stannett
- Editor: Margaret Goodspeed
- Running time: 87 minutes
- Production companies: Storyline Entertainment; Sony Pictures Television

Original release
- Network: A&E
- Release: December 11, 2006

Wedding Wars is a 2006 American LGBT romantic comedy television film directed by Jim Fall, written by Stephen Mazur, and starring John Stamos, Eric Dane, Bonnie Somerville, James Brolin and Sean Maher. The film was executive produced by Neil Meron and Craig Zadan. It premiered in the United States on December 11, 2006, on A&E.

Stamos portrays gay wedding planner Shel, who is prompted to speak out for his own right to marry when his brother Ben's (Dane) boss and future father-in-law Governor Welling (Brolin) speaks out publicly against gay marriage.

Stamos appeared on the cover of the LGBT news magazine The Advocate to promote Wedding Wars. The film was well-received, and it is the first of its kind to explore gay marriage.

== Plot ==
Gay party planner Shel (Stamos) is organizing the wedding of his straight brother Ben (Dane) to Maggie (Somerville). But when Maggie's father and Ben's boss, Maine's Governor Welling (Brolin), makes a speech against gay marriage, Shel goes on strike for equal rights. His cause picks up steam and eventually spreads nationwide in a "no gays for a day" movement.

== Cast and characters ==
- John Stamos - Shel Grandy
- Eric Dane - Ben Grandy
- Bonnie Somerville - Maggie Welling
- James Brolin - Governor Conrad Welling
- Sean Maher - Ted Moore

== Production ==
In April 2006, it was reported that A&E had greenlit production of the film, then titled Wedding March. Of Stamos, director Fall said, "John's incredibly charming ... which makes him the perfect conduit for the message of this movie." He went on to explain, "I didn't want to make just another 'gay' movie ... I wanted to make a point and really say something, but subtly. I wanted to show both sides without vilifying anyone. I wanted to win people over with comedy — and who better to help with that than someone who has been coming into their living rooms for years now?" Executive producer Neil Meron said, "John was always the first choice for the role." Stamos stated he was proud of the film, noting "Initially it's not about this issue of gay marriage. It's just the simple fact that his brother gets to have something that he can't have, and why shouldn't he get to have it? He can plan a wedding but can't have one himself."

Wedding Wars was filmed in Halifax, Nova Scotia.

== Reception ==
The Advocate called Wedding Wars "A family comedy that manages to tackle the issue of same-sex marriage with light humor and a deft touch."

In a December 2012 AfterElton.com interview, director Fall stated that he was very proud of the film, noting that "it was kind of subversive, because it really was an entertaining comedy. But the politics are clear in the movie and so I think a lot of people watched it as sheer entertainment but there’s an explicit political agenda going on. It was a very clever way, I think. Kind of a spoonful of sugar thing."
