= John Stamos =

American actor and musician (born 1963)

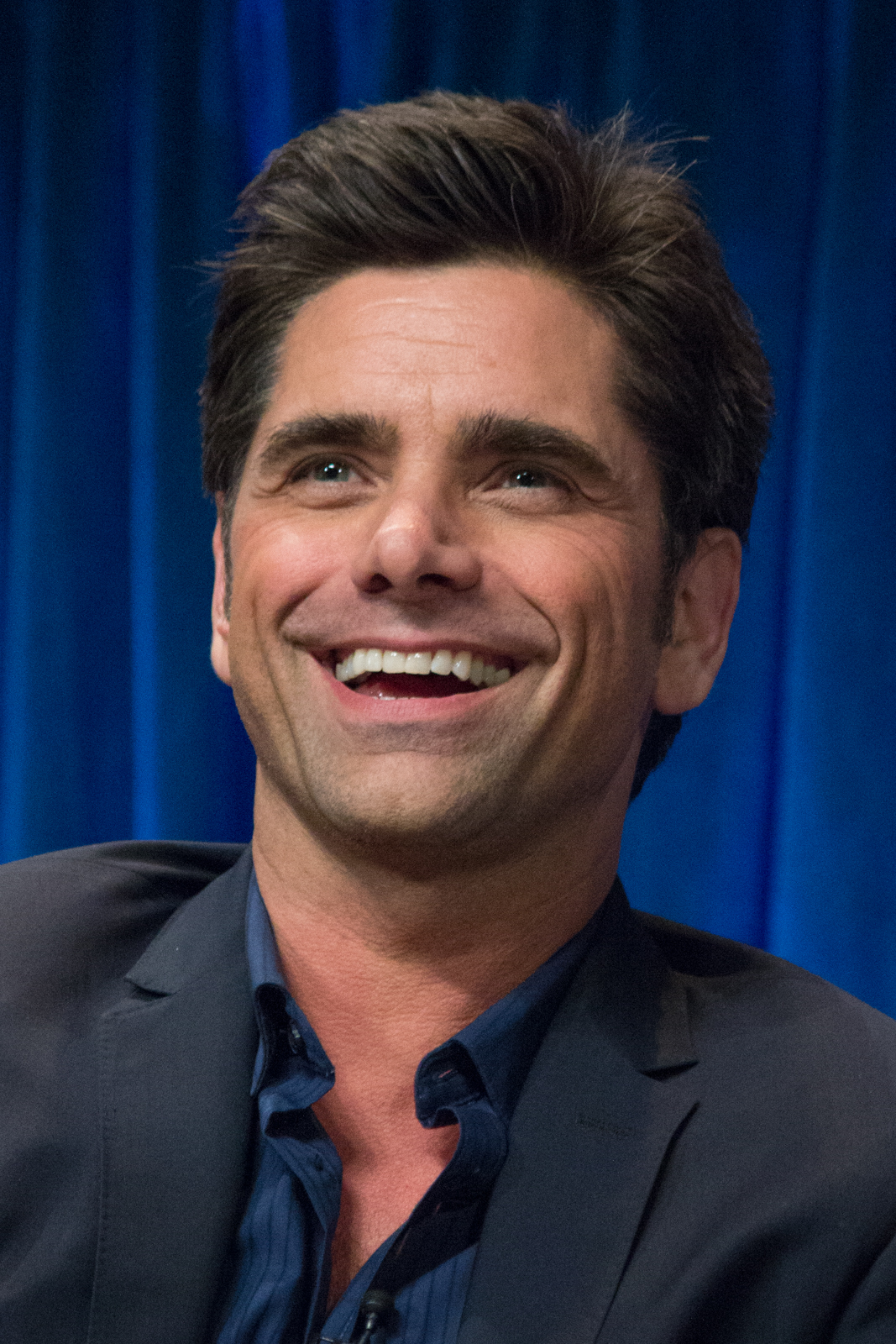
- Stamos in 2013
- Born: John Phillip Stamos; August 19, 1963 (age 63); Cypress, California, U.S.
- Occupations: Actor; musician
- Years active: 1982–present
- Spouses: Rebecca Romijn (m. 1998; div. 2005) Caitlin McHugh (m. 2018)
- Children: 1

John Phillip Stamos (/ˈsteɪmoʊs/ STAY-mohss; born August 19, 1963) is an American actor and musician. He first gained recognition for his contract role as Blackie Parrish on the ABC television soap opera General Hospital, for which he was nominated for the Daytime Emmy Award for Outstanding Supporting Actor in a Drama Series at the 10th Daytime Emmy Awards in 1983. He is known for his work in television, especially in his starring role as Jesse Katsopolis on the ABC sitcom Full House. Since the show's finale in 1995, Stamos has appeared in numerous TV films and series.

From 2005 to 2009, Stamos had a starring role on the NBC medical drama ER as Dr. Tony Gates. After Broadway stints in How to Succeed in Business Without Really Trying and Cabaret, Stamos began playing the role of Albert Peterson in the Broadway revival of Bye Bye Birdie, which he starred in from October 2009 to January 2010. He then played Senator Joseph Cantwell in a Broadway revival of Gore Vidal's play The Best Man from July to September 2012, replacing Eric McCormack.

From September 2015 to 2016, Stamos starred as the lead character in the Fox sitcom Grandfathered. He executive produced the Netflix series Fuller House, in which he reprised the role of Jesse Katsopolis. He also starred in Never Too Young to Die (1986), Born to Ride (1991), and as Dr. Nicky in the Lifetime/Netflix psychological thriller You.

== Early life ==
John Stamos was born on August 19, 1963, in Cypress, California, to William "Bill" Stamos, a second-generation Greek-American restaurateur originating from the village of Kakouri in Arcadia and Loretta (née Phillips). His original family surname is Stamatopoulos (Greek: Σταματόπουλος).

In his youth, Stamos worked for his father's restaurants, and as a teenager, had a job flipping burgers in the Orange County area. He attended John F. Kennedy High School and played in the marching band there. At 15, he attended his first Beach Boys concert; a huge fan, he would later tour with the band. His parents were supportive of his aspiration to be an actor, and although he planned to enroll at Cypress College for the 1981 term, he skipped his first semester to focus on launching a career as an actor—with his father's blessing. After just three weeks, he landed his first role on General Hospital.

== Acting career ==
=== 1982–1986: Early career ===
Stamos began his acting career with the role of Blackie Parrish on the soap opera General Hospital in late January 1982, for which he was nominated for a Daytime Emmy Award for Outstanding Supporting Actor in a Drama Series at the 10th Daytime Emmy Awards in 1983. That April, he went on to the lead role in the short-lived CBS sitcom Dreams, in which he played Gino Minnelli, an aspiring musician in a band of the same name. Later, he was a series regular on the sitcom You Again? (1986) with Jack Klugman. In 1986, Stamos starred in his first film Never Too Young to Die, an action spy film also starring Kiss bassist Gene Simmons. Though intended to be a "young James Bond" film (and even starred former Bond actor George Lazenby as Drew Stargrove, the father of Stamos' character Lance Stargrove), the movie was a critical and commercial flop.

=== 1987–1995: Full House ===
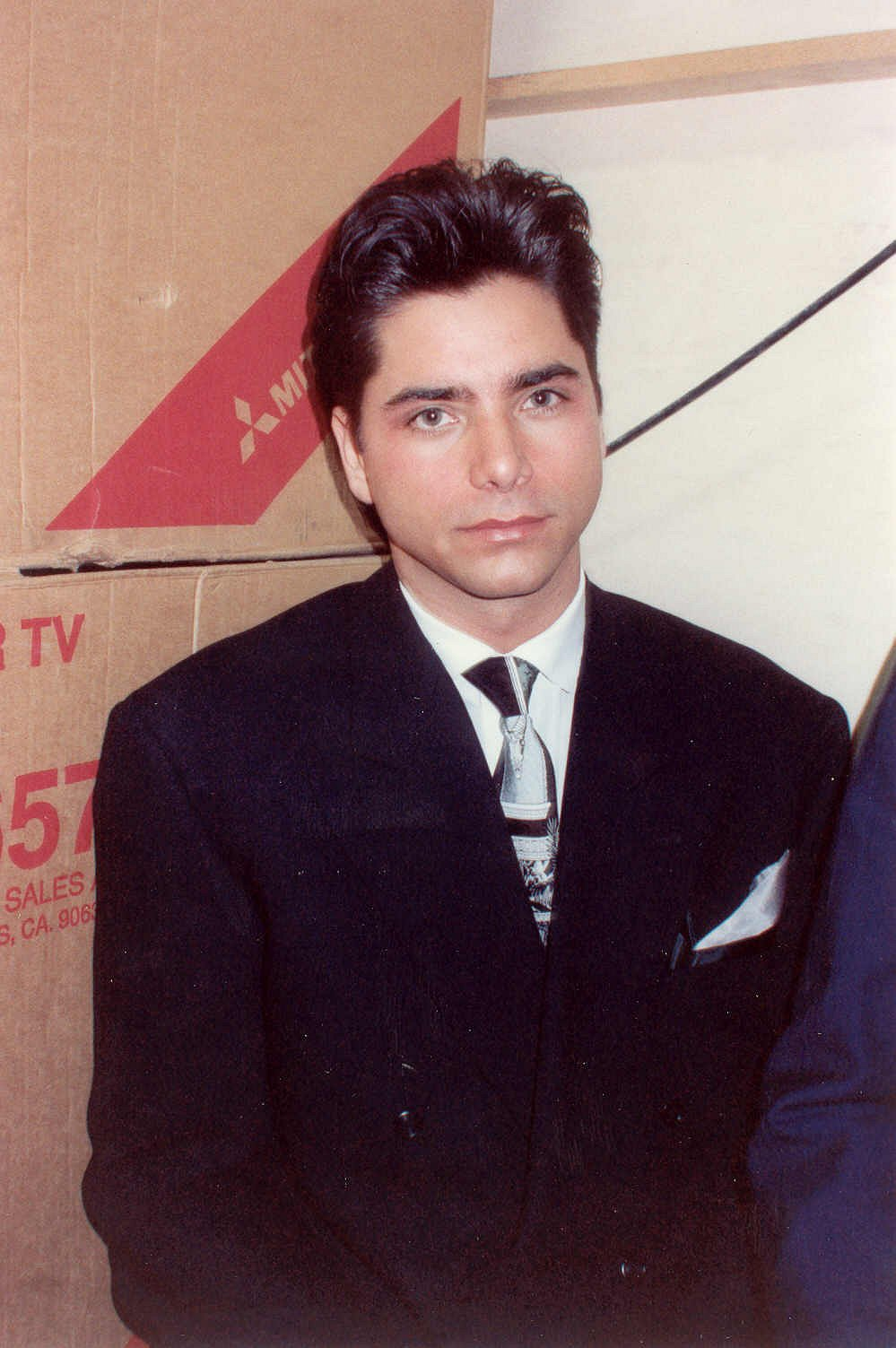
Stamos at the 1990 Grammy Awards

In the late 1980s, ABC's Full House gradually became a hit, and the show solidified Stamos's career. He asked that his character's last name be changed from Cochran to Katsopolis to highlight his Greek heritage, according to show creator and executive producer Jeff Franklin. He played one of the show's protagonists, Jesse, who lives with his brother-in-law, Danny Tanner (Bob Saget), whose deceased wife Pam Tanner (Christine Houser) was Jesse's older sister. Danny's best friend, Joey Gladstone (Dave Coulier), also lives in the house with them. The three help each other raise Danny's three young daughters D.J. (Candace Cameron), Stephanie (Jodie Sweetin) and Michelle Tanner (Mary-Kate and Ashley Olsen). Jesse is known to be the "bad boy" at first until he falls in love with and marries Rebecca Donaldson (Lori Loughlin) and has twin boys, Nicky and Alex Katsopolis (Blake and Dylan Tuomy-Wilhoit). In 1995, after eight seasons, the series came to an end. Stamos has since maintained close relationships with co-stars Bob Saget, Dave Coulier, Lori Loughlin, Jodie Sweetin, Mary-Kate and Ashley Olsen, Andrea Barber, and Candace Cameron Bure.

=== 1996–2009: Later career ===
Stamos has appeared in numerous made-for-television films, stage productions, television series, and commercials. He had starring roles in the television series Thieves (2001) and Jake in Progress (2005). Both shows ran for several episodes before cancellation. In 2003, Stamos guest-starred on Friends, appearing in the season nine episode, "The One with the Donor", playing Zack, a man who went to Chandler Bing (Matthew Perry) and Monica Gellar (Courteney Cox)'s apartment for dinner, not knowing he was actually being interviewed to be a sperm donor. Stamos was a guest star in a first-season episode of MTV's The Andy Milonakis Show (2005), playing himself. He took part in only one skit, which featured him in a tree, having rabies, and being put down by another character. In the A&E television movie Wedding Wars (2006), he starred as Shel Grandy, a gay wedding planner. He stated that his performance reflected his support for same-sex marriages.

He has made several voice acting appearances such as in the MTV animated series Clone High in the 2003 episode, "Changes: The Big Prom: The Sex Romp: The Season Finale", where he played himself, and as the What's Global Warming Penguin in Bob Saget's 2007 parody film Farce of the Penguins. In 2005, Stamos guest-starred in two episodes in season 12 of ER as paramedic-turned-intern Tony Gates. In 2006, at the start of ER's thirteenth season, he joined the cast as a series regular. In February 2008, Stamos appeared in the television adaptation of A Raisin in the Sun. In August 2008, he was the roastmaster for the Comedy Central Roast of Bob Saget.

=== 2010–present: Grandfathered, Fuller House, and other ventures ===
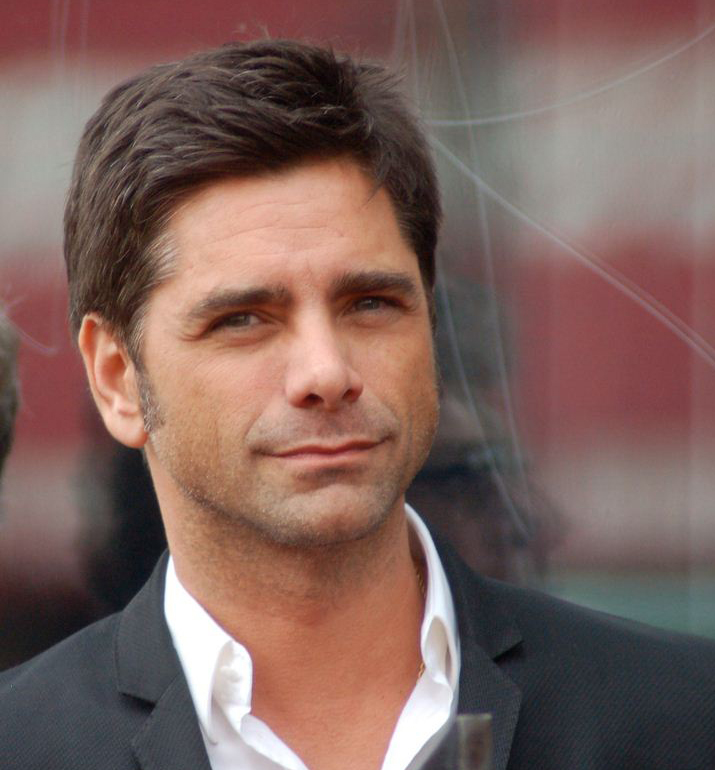
Stamos in 2012

On June 8, 2010, it was announced that Stamos would portray Carl Howell, a new love interest for Emma Pillsbury (Jayma Mays), in season two of the television show Glee. In 2011, Stamos guest-starred on Law & Order: Special Victims Unit and was featured in a CollegeHumor video with Bob Saget. Stamos also guest-starred as himself on Two and a Half Men as Charlie Harper (Charlie Sheen)'s old friend, who was interested in buying the house until he found out that the place was Charlie's.

Since 2011, Stamos has appeared in a series of commercials for Dannon's Greek yogurt brand Oikos; including his first Super Bowl commercial, which was aired during Super Bowl 2012. In February 2012, it was reported that Stamos would take on one of the lead roles on the new Fox drama Little Brother. The series was created by Everybody Loves Raymond writer Mike Royce, and centers around a man who finds out that he has a long-lost half-brother.

In March 2013, Stamos signed on in a recurring role on the USA Network drama Necessary Roughness, during season three. He played Connor McClane, the head of a sports and entertainment management company that is interested in hiring Dani Santino (Callie Thorne). Stamos was to play the lead role in ABC's soap opera Members Only, but the network decided not to air the show.

In April 2015, Stamos announced on Jimmy Kimmel Live! that the streaming service Netflix would be picking up Full House for a 13-episode sequel, titled Fuller House, to start airing on February 26, 2016. In September, he began leading the cast of the Fox sitcom Grandfathered, also starring Josh Peck, Christina Milian, and Paget Brewster. In 2016, Stamos appeared in the film My Big Fat Greek Wedding 2, and joined the Fox black comedy series Scream Queens in its second season, as series regular Dr. Brock Holt.

In 2018, Stamos starred in Lifetime's television adaptation of You as Dr. Nicky, which premiered on September 9, 2018. On June 24, 2019, it was confirmed that Stamos would reprise his role as Dr. Nicky in the second season, by which point the series had been announced to move to Netflix. The second season was released on December 26, 2019.

In 2021, Stamos hosted a series of episodes on the podcast The Grand Scheme entitled Snatching Sinatra, in which he interviewed personal friend Barry Keenan about his 1963 kidnapping of Frank Sinatra Jr. The following year, Keenan notified Stamos shortly before committing suicide due to health issues at age 82. Stamos then announced Keenan's death to the world on Instagram.

In 2022, Stamos recurred in Spidey and His Amazing Friends where he voiced Iron Man.

In 2025, Stamos recurred in Iron Man and His Awesome Friends as Howard Stark. In 2025, Stamos was cast in the second season of Apple TV's Palm Royale.

== Music and theatre ==
Stamos started learning drums when he was four, then began to take up playing the guitar, and started his own band called Destiny. The band played concerts at some amusement parks and parties.

=== Independently ===
Stamos performed on a 1994 album entitled Shades of Blue along with Lanny Cordola, Gary Griffin, Sandra Stephens, Tony Guerrero, and David Enos. Shades of Blue was re-released digitally through iTunes and other channels in 2010 after being long out-of-print. He appeared on Broadway as The Emcee in Cabaret, as Guido Contini in Nine, and as J. Pierrepont Finch in How to Succeed in Business Without Really Trying. Stamos performed the Billy Joel song "Lullabye (Goodnight, My Angel)" on the 2006 charity album Unexpected Dreams – Songs From the Stars.

On March 30, 2009, he announced that he would participate in the Broadway revival of Bye Bye Birdie. Stamos won the 2009–10 Golden Icon Award for best actor in a musical for his performance in that production. Stamos was awarded a star on the Hollywood Walk of Fame on November 16, 2009. The star is located at 7021 Hollywood Blvd.

Stamos performed with John Fogerty on April 24, 2010, during one of the Tampa Bay Rays post-game concerts. Stamos rotated between the tambourine, drums, and bass guitar throughout the concert. In August 2011, Stamos performed in Hairspray at the Hollywood Bowl as Corny Collins, alongside an all-star cast.

On July 10, 2012, Stamos began performances on Broadway in Gore Vidal's The Best Man as Senator Joseph Cantwell. Stamos reprised his role as Jesse Katsopolis for a "Jesse and the Rippers" reunion on Late Night with Jimmy Fallon on July 19, 2013. Played straight by host Fallon (who introduced the band as being from San Francisco and having a number one song in Japan), Stamos performed a medley of songs featured on Full House including "Forever" and the series' theme song "Everywhere You Look". Bob Saget and Lori Loughlin also made cameos.

In 2014, Stamos directed the music video "Let Yourself be Loved" for the Nashville-based band Diamond Carter, featuring the band's front-man Tyler Tuohy alongside actress Nicky Whelan. Stamos was also noted as a co-writer for the song, along with Michael Gigante, and the video was released on Yahoo Music on May 21, 2014.

In April of 2025, Stamos played in one of the most-watched (and most upvoted) "blind cover" videos on Drumeo's YouTube channel, being challenged with Papa Roach's Last Resort.

=== The Beach Boys ===
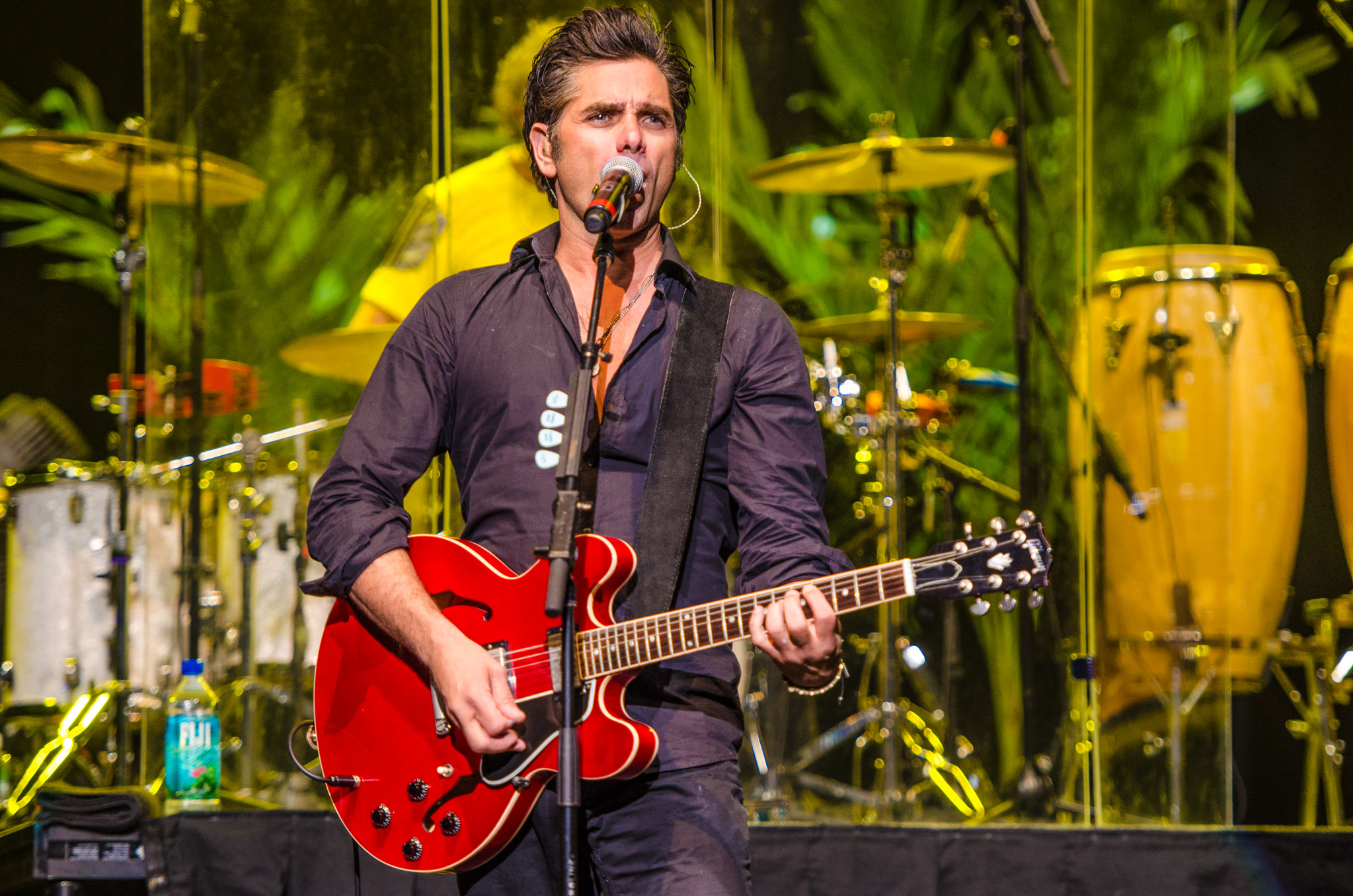
Stamos playing with the Beach Boys at Neal S. Blaisdell Center in Honolulu, Hawaii, January 2014

Stamos has occasionally performed in concert with the Beach Boys, dating back to 1985, typically playing drums and various other percussion instruments. In 1988, he appeared in their video for "Kokomo", in which he played conga drums and steel drums. In 1990, he played drums for them on the title track of the comedy Problem Child and also appeared in the song's music video.

In 1992, he sang lead vocals on a new version of "Forever" for their album Summer in Paradise. The song was originally written and sung by Beach Boy Dennis Wilson and released in 1970. The song was also featured twice on Full House. The first was a recording sung at his character's wedding, while the second was a recording sung for his character's twin sons. The 1992 music video, titled "Forever by Jesse and the Rippers," featured Stamos predominantly. However, three of The Beach Boys members are briefly shown singing harmonies with Stamos: Carl Wilson, Bruce Johnston, and Mike Love.

Other performances include:

- July 4, 1985, Ben Franklin Parkway in Philadelphia, in a large outdoor performance that featured guests like Jimmy Page, Joan Jett, Mr. T, Christopher Cross and the Oak Ridge Boys.
- March 30, 2010, on a season 8 episode of ABC's Dancing with the Stars, playing drums, congas, and guitar, also touring with them that spring, including an appearance at Fort Myers, Florida
- June 2011 at a benefit concert for the Terri Schiavo Life & Hope Network
- Several appearances on their 50th Reunion Tour (April – September 2012)
- May 26, 2013, performed during a post-game concert at Great American Ball Park in Cincinnati, Ohio
- July 4, 2017, performed during the A Capitol Fourth concert in Washington, D.C.
- July 4, 2018, hosted the A Capitol Fourth special on PBS and performed with The Beach Boys in front of the White House in Washington, D.C.
- March 24, 2022, emceed the 80-year MD Anderson benefit concert and performed with The Beach Boys at the Toyota Center in Houston, Texas

In June 2010, Stamos performed bongos on a version of "California Dreamin'" that appeared on co-founding Beach Boy Al Jardine's solo album A Postcard from California. Glen Campbell also provided guest vocals on the song.

In October 2026, Stamos was announced as performing at that year's Epcot International Food & Wine Festival as John Stamos and the California Sound, replacing the Beach Boys, who were scheduled to perform at the festival. Stamos' band features the same musicians as the touring lineup of the Beach Boys minus Love. The group played classic songs by the Beach Boys and other artists, as well as a version of "Les Poissons" from The Little Mermaid, performed by Stamos.

== Personal life ==
Stamos is a big fan of Elvis Presley and has often referenced or paid homage to him in the show Full House. Stamos began dating model and actress Rebecca Romijn in 1994 after they met at a Victoria's Secret fashion show in which she was modeling. Stamos and Romijn became engaged on Christmas Eve 1997, and they married on September 19, 1998, at the Beverly Hills Hotel. They announced their separation in April 2004. Stamos filed for divorce in August 2004, and it became final on March 1, 2005.

Since 2005, Stamos has been the national spokesperson for the Project Cuddle child-oriented charity.

On October 23, 2017, Stamos announced his engagement to model and actress Caitlin McHugh after a year of dating. In December 2017, the couple announced they were expecting their first child, due in the spring of 2018. Stamos and McHugh married in February 2018. The couple's son was born in April 2018.

On May 19, 2018, Stamos and McHugh announced their new jewelry line, "St. Amos Jewelry", with 100% of the proceeds going to the Childhelp foundation.

== Acting credits ==
=== Film ===
Year	Title	Role	Notes
1986	Never Too Young to Die	Lance Stargrove	
1991	Born to Ride	Cpl. Grady Westfall	
1997	Private Parts	Himself	Cameo
2000	Dropping Out	Ronny	
2001	My Best Friend's Wife	Steve Richards	
2002	Run Ronnie Run!	Himself	
2002	Femme Fatale	Cheesy Agent	Uncredited
2003	Party Monster	Talk Show Host	
2004	I Am Stamos	Himself	Short film
2004	Knots	Cal Scoppa	
2006	Farce of the Penguins	What's Global Warming Penguin	Voice role
2010	Father of Invention	Steven Leslie	
2014	My Man Is a Loser	Mike	
2014	They Came Together	Assistant Engineer	Cameo
2016	My Big Fat Greek Wedding 2	George	
2018	Ploey: You Never Fly Alone	Giron (voice)	
2022	Dirty Daddy: The Bob Saget Tribute	Himself	
2026	Drag	TBA	Post-production; also executive producer

=== Television ===
Year	Title	Role	Notes
1982–84	General Hospital	Blackie Parrish	Main role (139 episodes)
1984	Dreams	Gino Minnelli	12 episodes
1985	Alice in Wonderland	Messenger	Movie
1986–87	You Again?	Matt Willows	Lead role (26 episodes)
1987–95	Full House	Jesse Katsopolis	Lead role (192 episodes)
1989	The New Mickey Mouse Club	Jesse Katsopolis	Episode: "Guest Day"
1990	Daughter of the Streets	Joey	Movie
1991	Captive	Robert Knott	Movie
1992	General Hospital	Himself	Cameo
1992	Hangin' with Mr. Cooper	Jesse Katsopolis	Episode: "Hangin' with Michelle"
1993	The Disappearance of Christina	Joe Seldon	Movie
1993	Tales from the Crypt	Johnny Canaparo	Episode: "Till Death Do We Part"
1994	Step by Step	Himself	Episode: "Great Expectations"
1994	Full House	Stavros	Episode: "Kissing Cousins"
1994	Fatal Vows: The Alexandra O'Hara Story	Nick Pagan	Movie
1995	Baywatch	Drummer	Episode: "Surf's Up"
1995; 1997	The Larry Sanders Show	Himself	2 episodes
1997	Tracey Takes On...	Rob Trasca	Episode: "Movies"
1997	A Match Made in Heaven	Tom Rosner	Movie
1998	The Marriage Fool	Robert Walsh	Movie
1999	Sealed with a Kiss	Bennett Blake	Movie
2000	The Beach Boys: An American Family	Drummer	Miniseries; also executive producer
2000	How to Marry a Billionaire: A Christmas Tale	Tom Nathan	Movie
2001	Thieves	Johnny	Lead role (10 episodes); also producer
2003	Clone High	Himself (voice)	Episode: "Changes: The Big Prom: The Sex Romp: The Season Finale"
2003	Friends	Zack	Episode: "The One with the Donor"
2003	The Reagans	John Sears	Movie
2005	The Andy Milonakis Show	Himself	Episode: "1.3"
2005–06	Jake in Progress	Jake Phillips	Lead role (21 episodes); also producer
2005–09	ER	Dr. Tony Gates	Lead role (65 episodes)
2006	Wedding Wars	Shel Grandy	Movie
2008	Comedy Central Roast	Himself/Roastmaster	Special; episode: "Comedy Central Roast of Bob Saget"
2008	A Raisin in the Sun	Carl Lindner	Movie
2008	The Two Mr. Kissels	Andrew Kissel	Movie; also producer
2010	Entourage	Himself	Episode: "Tequila Sunrise"
2010–11	Glee	Dr. Carl Howell	4 episodes
2011	Law & Order: Special Victims Unit	Ken Turner	Episode: "Bang"
2011, 2015	Two and a Half Men	Himself	2 episodes
2012	Secrets of Eden	Pastor Steven Drew	Movie
2013	The New Normal	Brice	5 episodes
2013	Necessary Roughness	Connor McClane	10 episodes
2013	Losing It with John Stamos	Himself/Host	Web series (20 episodes); also executive producer
2013	I Am Victor	Victor	Unsold pilot
2014	Stuck on A	Himself	Episode: "Mercy"
2015	Members Only	Randy Harris	Cancelled before premiere
2015	Galavant	Sir Jean Hamm	2 episodes
2015–16	Grandfathered	Jimmy Martino	Lead role (22 episodes); also executive producer
2016–20	Fuller House	Jesse Katsopolis	Recurring role (17 episodes); also executive producer
2016	Scream Queens	Dr. Brock Holt	Main role (10 episodes)
2017	Who Do You Think You Are?	Himself	1 episode
2017–20	A Capitol Fourth	Himself/Host	Also performed with The Beach Boys
2018–19	You	Dr. Nicky	Recurring role (5 episodes)
2019	Historical Roasts	John Wilkes Booth	Episode: "Abraham Lincoln"
2019	The Little Mermaid Live!	Chef Louis	Special
2020	Royalties	Elliot Peck	3 episodes
2021–22	Big Shot	Marvyn Korn	Main role (20 episodes); also executive producer
2021	Muppets Haunted Mansion	Himself	Special
2022–present	Spidey and His Amazing Friends	Tony Stark / Iron Man (voice)	Recurring role (9 episodes)
2022–25	Mickey Mouse Funhouse	Captain Salty Bones (voice)	Recurring role (11 episodes)
2023	The Prank Panel	Himself/Host	Episode: "Gullible Granny / Pageant Problems"
2023	Harley Quinn	Etrigan the Demon (voice)	Episode: "A Very Problematic Valentine's Day Special"
2024	Unprisoned	Murphy Collins	4 episodes
2024	LEGO Marvel Avengers: Mission Demolition	Tony Stark / Iron Man (voice)	Disney+ special
2024	Doctor Odyssey	Craig Massey	Episode: "Oh, Daddy!"
2025	Phineas and Ferb	Meap (voice)	Episode: "Meap Me in St. Louis"
2025	Kiff	Hobart Angstrom (voice)	Recurring role
2025	Palm Royale	Dr. Dusty Magic	Recurring role
2025–present	Iron Man and His Awesome Friends	Howard Stark (voice)	Recurring role

=== Theatre ===
Year	Title	Role	Notes
1995-1996	How to Succeed in Business; Without Really Trying	J. Pierrepont Finch	Broadway
2002	Cabaret	The Emcee	Broadway
2003	Nine	Guido Contini	Broadway
2009-2010	Bye Bye Birdie	Albert Peterson	Broadway
2011	Hairspray	Corny Collins	Hollywood Bowl
2012	The Best Man	Senator Joseph Cantwell	Broadway
2016	The Little Mermaid	Chef Louis	Hollywood Bowl
2023	Gutenberg! The Musical!	The Producer	Broadway (One night cameo)
2025	Jesus Christ Superstar	King Herod	Hollywood Bowl
2025	The Nightmare Before Christmas	Lock	Hollywood Bowl

== Awards and nominations ==
Year	Association	Category	Nominated work	Result
1982	Soapy Awards	Most Exciting New Actor	General Hospital	Won
1983	Daytime Emmy Awards	Outstanding Supporting Actor in a Drama Series	General Hospital	Nominated
1983	Young Artist Awards	Outstanding Supporting Actor in a Drama Series	General Hospital	Nominated
1983	Soapy Awards	Outstanding Supporting Actor: Daytime	General Hospital	Won
1984	Young Artist Awards	Outstanding Supporting Actor in a Drama Series (tie with David Mendenhall for General Hospital)	General Hospital	Won
1985	Young Artist Awards	Best Young Actor in a Television Comedy Series	Dreams	Nominated
2000	Primetime Emmy Awards	Outstanding Miniseries	The Beach Boys: An American Family	Nominated
2004	TV Land Awards	Quintessential Non-Traditional Family	Full House	Nominated
2007	TV Land Awards	Favorite Elvis Impression	Full House	Won
2016	People's Choice Awards	Favorite Actor in a New TV Series	Grandfathered	Won
2018	Primetime Emmy Awards	Outstanding Children's Program	Fuller House	Nominated

== Book ==
- Stamos, John; Daphne Young (October 24, 2023). If You Would Have Told Me: A Memoir. Foreword: Jamie Lee Curtis. New York: Henry Holt and Company. ISBN 978-1-250-89097-9. OCLC 1362507268.
