= Caitlin McHugh =

American actress, writer, model

- Born: May 13, 1986 (age 40)
- Occupations: Actress; writer; model
- Years active: 2007–present
- Spouses: Massimo Lusardi (m. 2011; div. 2014) John Stamos (m. 2018)
- Children: 1

Caitlin McHugh (born May 13, 1986) is an American actress, writer, and model.

== Career ==
McHugh first began to find bit parts in film and television in 2007 was cast in a minor role in I Am Legend. But her part was cut out and she never appeared in the film. She earned nine more credits in the next six years. In 2014, she portrayed Sloan in the fifth season of the TV series The Vampire Diaries. In 2017, she co-wrote the romantic comedy short film Ingenue-ish with fellow actor John Stamos, who co-starred with her.

McHugh is signed with Wilhelmina Models in Manhattan, New York. In 2016, she appeared in television commercials for Colgate toothpaste and the next year, for Buick SUVs.

== Personal life ==
McHugh is of Irish and Filipino descent. She married restaurateur Massimo Lusardi on June 3, 2011. They separated a few months later and divorced in 2014.

In 2011, McHugh met John Stamos when they both guest-starred on an episode of Law & Order: Special Victims Unit. They began dating in 2016 and were engaged in October 2017. They married in February 2018 and their son was born in April 2018.
