= Diamond Carter =

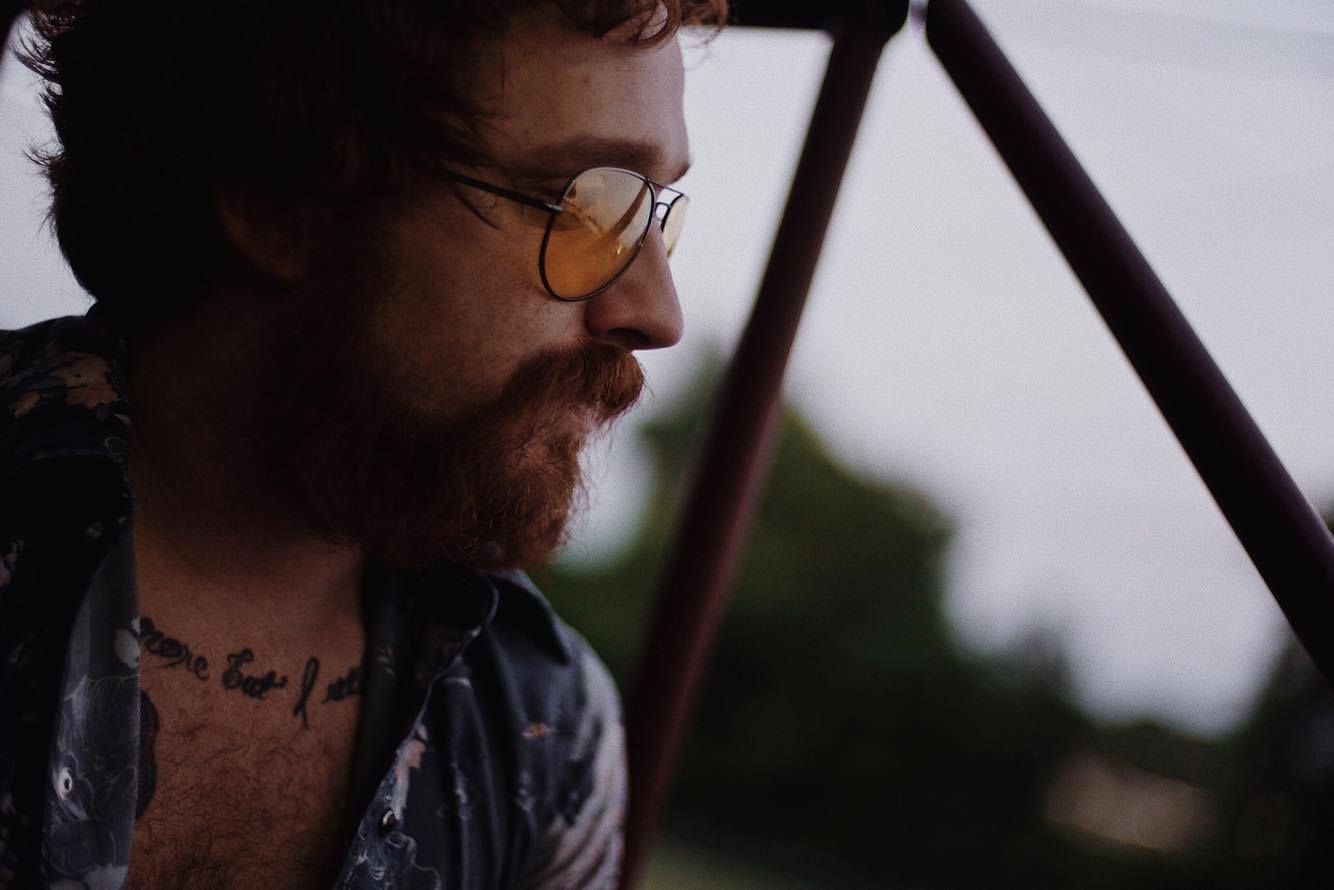
- Diamond Carter at Gray Matters Studios in Nashville, TN

Background information
- Genres: American singer-songwriter
- Years active: 2011–present
- Members: Tyler Tuohy

Diamond Carter is a Nashville-based singer/songwriter from Southern California. Originally formed as a band in 2011, Carter relocated to Nashville in 2013, with a sound straddling the border between blues, jazz and indie-pop.

The band's first album, Pink Balloon, was released in September 2012 and debuted their radio single “Let Yourself be Loved,” co-written by Tyler Tuohy, Michael Gigante, and John Stamos.

In March 2014, John Stamos directed the “Let Yourself be Loved” music video starring Tuohy alongside actress Nicky Whelan. The video was released as a feature music video on Yahoo Music May 14, 2014 and received Twitter recognition from artists such as Howard Stern, Lori Loughlin, Amanda Cerny, and Matt Sorum.

In 2016, Diamond Carter recorded his first solo album with Jars Of Clay guitarist and producer Matt Odmark at Gray Matters Studio in Nashville; as yet unreleased, the album contains the singles "Santa Cruz" and "Women & Booze". He has had multiple songs in regular rotation on Nashville based radio station, Lightning 100, who have also made him their "Artist of the Week" on four separate occasions, more than any other artist in the station's history.

The Recording Academy asked Diamond Carter to perform as the sole act at their Producers and Engineers Wing, NAMM Show reception at Third Man Records in Nashville in July 2017.

Carter is currently working on releasing his third full-length album "Moon Paradise." The single "I Believe In Too (Things)" is set for release on January 12, 2018.

== Discography ==
- Pink Balloon (2013)
- Flowers of Evil; Searching for a Sound (2013)
- Fuzzy Holly and the Mistletoe Mishap (2013)
- "Legend" (Single) (2013)
- "Evil is a Young Man's Game"

Credits:

- Marc VanGool - Guitar

(Single) (2013)

- Duende (2014)
