= Living Proof (2008 film) =

- Genre: Biography; Drama
- Written by: Vivienne Radkoff, Robert Bazell
- Directed by: Dan Ireland
- Starring: Harry Connick Jr. Tammy Blanchard; Amanda Bynes; Jennifer Coolidge; Angie Harmon; John Benjamin Hickey; Regina King; Swoosie Kurtz; Paula Cale Lisbe; Amy Madigan; Bernadette Peters; Trudie Styler
- Music by: Halli Cauthery
- Country of origin: United States
- Original language: English

Production
- Executive producers: Vivienne Radkoff; Renée Zellweger
- Producers: Neil Meron; Craig Zadan
- Cinematography: James Chressanthis
- Editor: Margaret Goodspeed
- Running time: 125 min.
- Production companies: Lifetime; Sony Pictures Television; Storyline Entertainment

Original release
- Network: Lifetime
- Release: October 18, 2008

Living Proof is a 2008 Lifetime Television film directed by Dan Ireland. The film stars Harry Connick Jr. as Dr. Dennis Slamon, a doctor attempting to find a cure for breast cancer. Paula Cale, Angie Harmon, and Amanda Bynes (in her final television appearance) appear in supporting roles.

== Plot ==
The film recounts the true story of Dr. Dennis Slamon (played by Harry Connick Jr.), who helped develop the breast cancer drug Herceptin, over eight years from 1988 to 1996. Dr. Slamon, a physician scientist at UCLA Medical Center in Los Angeles, develops the experimental drug Herceptin, which he believes will treat breast cancer. When the drug company ceases funding the research, philanthropists, including Lilly Tartikoff (Angie Harmon) and Ronald Perelman, help him continue his research. Funding includes an initial donation from Perelman's Revlon charity, and continues over the years with the "Fire and Ice Ball" organized by Tartikoff.

The drug company eventually resumes funding the research, and the drug undergoes three trials before gaining approval from the FDA (Food and Drug Administration). Prior to the trials, the drug undergoes a preclinical animal trial. Nicole (Tammy Blanchard), a young mother with stage 4 cancer, receives the drug first. Although her mother Elizabeth (Swoosie Kurtz) pleads with Dr. Slamon, Nicole is not included in the subsequent trials because she does not meet the trial requirements. The women in the trials, particularly the first trial, band together. They handle their disease and drug trial with humor—Tish (Jennifer Coolidge)—or with alternative therapy—Tina (Trudie Styler). The stories of Barbara (Bernadette Peters) and Ellie (Regina King) are followed throughout, as they go through the trials and eventual recovery. Although some patients involved in the tests die, Slamon's work with the drug ultimately changes the course of breast cancer treatment.

== Cast ==
- Harry Connick Jr. as Dr. Dennis Slamon
- Tammy Blanchard as Nicole, the first woman to receive Herceptin
- Amanda Bynes as Jamie, Dr. Slamon's student assistant
- Jennifer Coolidge as Tish, participant in Phase One of the Her2 study
- Angie Harmon as Lilly Tartikoff, wife of Brandon Tartikoff (NBC Television president)
- John Benjamin Hickey as Blake Rogers, Dr. Slamon's friend and fellow scientist
- Regina King as Ellie, a fashion designer and breast cancer survivor
- Swoosie Kurtz as Elizabeth, Nicole's mother
- Paula Cale Lisbe as Donna Slamon, Dr. Slamon's wife
- Amy Madigan as Fran Visco, President of the National Breast Cancer Coalition
- Bernadette Peters as Barbara Bradfield, a retired art teacher and the first woman the drug trial saved by Herceptin
- Trudie Styler as Tina, participant in Phase One of the Her2 study
- Bruce McKinnon as Dean Bradfield, Barbara Bradfield's husband
- Jackson Hurst as Josh
- Tom Nowicki as Carl Reinhardt
- Brandon Smith as Pharmacy Board Member
- William Ragsdale as Andy Marks
- Melissa McBride as Sally
- Lance E. Nichols as Dr. Brown, Barbara's physician
- Rhoda Griffis as Bindy Hawn, a member of the Revlon charity board

Note: the women patients portrayed are composites with the exception of Barbara Bradfield.

== Soundtrack ==
Harry Connick Jr. wrote "Song for the Hopeful", which is also on Connick's album What a Night! A Christmas Album, released in November 2008. Sony announced it would contribute to breast cancer charities for each download of "Song for the Hopeful" (Theme from "Living Proof") from iTunes, where it was released on October 7, 2008.

== Production ==
Teleplay writer Vivienne Radkoff developed the story over seven years. It is an adaptation of Robert Bazell's book HER-2: The Making of Herceptin, a Revolutionary Treatment for Breast Cancer. The film was the first mainstream feature film scored as a solo project by composer Halli Cauthery.

Renée Zellweger, in her first television project, is executive producer, with Neil Meron and Craig Zadan as producers. Zellweger previously produced Miss Potter (2006). Zellweger suggested casting Harry Connick, Jr. for the film. They acted together in the romantic comedy New in Town.

Filming of Living Proof took place in New Orleans, Louisiana in 2008. Connick suggested the filming location because "It's expensive to film in Los Angeles, and my being from New Orleans, it's a chance to help the city get back on its feet a little bit by employing a lot of the local people."

== Release ==
=== Release ===
The film premiered on October 18, 2008, for Lifetime's "Stop Breast Cancer for Life" public service and advocacy campaign, during National Breast Cancer Awareness Month. The movie averaged 2.5 million viewers in its debut on October 18, 2008.

A red carpet premiere screening took place in New York on September 24, 2008, with a reception following with Harry Connick, Jr. and Bernadette Peters performing. Subsequent screenings took place in Washington, D.C. (September 25), Los Angeles (October 7), and London (October 9).

=== Critical reception ===
Variety wrote: "Earnest, emotional and cast to the hilt with cameos for actresses, "Living Proof" rises above most Lifetime movie fare...There's also some nice camaraderie among the women patients, who are introduced as the song "Say a Little Prayer" appropriately plays in the background. It's that sort of movie – one without much use for subtlety – but the theme and execution should resonate strongly with those who tune in, helping promote the network's "Stop Breast Cancer for Life" public-awareness campaign.Lifetime movies often get a bad rap...but every once in awhile [sic], they genuinely do some good by doing well."

A Denver Post critic wrote: "A stunning lineup of talented actresses combines with a lively script to distinguish what might have been a fairly ordinary disease movie on Lifetime this weekend. A based-on-truth testament to perseverance and essential human goodness, the film offers proof that determined individuals can win the fight against huge, heartless drug companies."

A USA Today critic wrote: "'Living Proof' knows its target audience, though, and appeals to it with an earnestness made more engaging by a string of winning performances. Connick sustains the breezy charm he has shown as an actor and musician, but also shows a decided urgency in tracing Slamon's often frustrating, sometimes desperate struggle to get the support and funds required for his work...The women who take part in those trials are presented as a motley sorority and portrayed with a decided lack of vanity. Glamorous gals such as Bernadette Peters, Trudie Styler and Tammy Blanchard turn up looking weary and strained but also evoke the humor and resilience of their characters...Swoosie Kurtz and Regina King add extra sass as, respectively, Blanchard's mother and another young woman who survives cancer only to see it return in a more aggressive form."
