= Craig Zadan =

American film producer

- Born: April 15, 1949; Miami, Florida, U.S.
- Died: August 20, 2018 (aged 69); Los Angeles, California, U.S.
- Education: Hofstra University
- Occupations: Producer, director, writer
- Partner: Elwood Hopkins
- Writing career
- Years active: 1972–2018

Craig Zadan (April 15, 1949 – August 20, 2018) was an American producer and writer. Working alone and with Neil Meron, his partner in the production company Storyline Entertainment, he produced such films as Footloose, Chicago and Hairspray.

== Life and career ==
=== Early life ===
Zadan was born in Miami, Florida. He grew up in New York City, and attended Hofstra University. He wrote for New York magazine and also contributed articles to publications such as After Dark. He co-produced a Broadway tribute to Stephen Sondheim, Sondheim: A Musical Tribute, featuring Angela Lansbury and Alexis Smith in 1973. He wrote a book relating the "behind-the-scenes" of the musicals of composer Stephen Sondheim titled "Sondheim & Co." published in 1974, which has been updated with a subsequent edition and revisions until 1990. Meron invited Zadan to speak at a lecture series at Brooklyn College, and they became professional partners upon Meron's 1976 graduation. They worked for Joseph Papp at the Public Theater before going to California in the early 1980s to work for Peter Guber. He was openly gay.

=== Storyline Entertainment ===
In 1995, the Storyline Entertainment group had signed a deal with The Walt Disney Studios to produce television projects, including musical adaptations of its original film properties. Storyline Entertainment has had success with film musicals, such as Chicago (2002) and Hairspray (2007). On September 6, 2005, Storyline Entertainment had signed a deal with New Line Cinema to a two-year, first look deal in order to develop many theatrical projects on the big screen. Andrea McArdle, who originated the title role in Annie on stage, made a special appearance as the Star to Be in Zadan's televised version. Chita Rivera appears in Chicago as "Nickie"; she played "Velma Kelly" in the original 1975 production.

The film adaptation of Hairspray featured cameos by John Waters (writer/director) as "the flasher who lives next door", Jerry Stiller ("Wilbur Turnblad") as "Mr. Pinky" and Ricki Lake ("Tracy"). On the soundtrack, Lake joins Nikki Blonsky and Marissa Jaret Winokur ("Tracy" from the Broadway production) to sing "Mama I'm a Big Girl Now" over the closing credits, and Harvey Fierstein (Broadway's "Edna") can be heard briefly soon after. Mink Stole ("Tammy" in the original film) appears as the smoking woman on the street whom Waters flashes, and is also seen in the musical number, "Welcome to the 60s". Corey Reynolds ("Seaweed" in the Broadway production) appears on the soundtrack as singer of "Trouble on the Line."

=== Later career ===
Zadan and Meron produced the Academy Awards telecast from 2013 to 2015.

=== Death ===
Zadan died on August 20, 2018, at his home in Los Angeles of complications from shoulder replacement surgery at the age of 69.

== Filmography ==
- Footloose (1984) (producer)
- Sing (1989) (producer)
- If Looks Could Kill (1991) (producer)
- My Fellow Americans (1996) (executive producer)
- Brian's Song (2001) (executive producer)
- Chicago (2002) (executive producer)
- The Music Man (2003) (executive producer)
- Filthy Gorgeous: The Trannyshack Story (2006) (producer)
- The Banshee and Fin Magee (2007) (producer)
- Hairspray (2007) (producer)
- The Bucket List (2007) (producer)
- Living Proof (2008) (executive producer)
- The Mayor of Castro Street (2009) (producer; about life around Castro Street)
- Fahrenheit 451 (2009) (producer)
- Footloose (2011) (producer)

== Theater ==
- Up in One (1979), Broadway, musical revue
- Promises, Promises (2010), Broadway, musical revival
- How to Succeed in Business Without Really Trying (2011), Broadway, musical revival

== Television ==
=== Series ===
- Drop Dead Diva (2009) (executive producer)
- Smash (2012) (executive producer)

=== Films ===
- Gypsy (1993) (executive producer)
- Serving in Silence: The Margarethe Cammermeyer Story (1995) (executive producer)
- Twists of Terror (1997) (TV) (executive producer)
- Cinderella (1997) (executive producer)
- Annie (1999) (executive producer)
- Double Platinum (1999) (executive producer)
- Lucy (2003) (executive producer)
- The Reagans (2003) (producer)
- Wedding Wars (2006) (producer)
- A Raisin in the Sun (2008) (producer)
- Family Man (2008) (executive producer)
- Steel Magnolias (2012) (TV) (producer)
- Bonnie and Clyde: Dead and Alive (2013) (producer)
- Flint (2017) (producer)

=== Live productions ===
- The Sound of Music Live! (2013) (TV)
- Peter Pan Live! (2014) (TV)
- The Wiz Live! (2015) (TV)
- Hairspray Live! (2016) (TV)
- Jesus Christ Superstar Live in Concert (2018) (TV)

== Awards ceremonies ==
- 16th GLAAD Media Awards (2005) (executive producer)
- 85th Academy Awards (2013) (producer)
- 86th Academy Awards (2014) (producer)
- 87th Academy Awards (2015) (producer)

== Awards and nominations ==
In 2008, Zadan and Meron were awarded the Career Achievement Award by the Casting Society of America. He has been nominated for the Emmy Award eight times, along with his co-executive producer Meron (and the respective producers).
