= A Raisin in the Sun (2008 film) =

- Poster
- Based on: A Raisin in the Sun; 1959 play by Lorraine Hansberry
- Screenplay by: Paris Qualles
- Directed by: Kenny Leon
- Starring: Sean Combs; Audra McDonald; Phylicia Rashad; Sanaa Lathan; John Stamos; Justin Martin; Bill Nunn; Ron Cephas Jones; David Oyelowo; Sean Patrick Thomas
- Composer: Mervyn Warren
- Country of origin: United States
- Original language: English

Production
- Producers: Sean Combs; Craig Zadan; Neil Meron
- Cinematography: Ivan Strasburg
- Editor: Melissa Kent
- Running time: 131 minutes
- Production companies: Bad Boy Films; Storyline Entertainment; Sony Pictures Television

Original release
- Network: ABC
- Release: February 25, 2008

Related
- A Raisin in the Sun

A Raisin in the Sun is a 2008 American period drama television film directed by Kenny Leon and starring Sean Combs, Audra McDonald, Phylicia Rashad, and Sanaa Lathan. The teleplay by Paris Qualles is based on the award-winning 1959 play of the same name by Lorraine Hansberry and is the third film adaptation of that play, following the 1961 film that starred Sidney Poitier, Ruby Dee, Claudia McNeil, and Diana Sands, and the 1989 TV version on PBS' American Playhouse starring Danny Glover and Esther Rolle.

A Raisin in the Sun debuted at the 2008 Sundance Film Festival and was broadcast by ABC on February 25, 2008. According to Nielsen Media Research, the program was watched by 12.8 million viewers and ranked #9 in the ratings for the week ending March 2, 2008.

== Plot ==
In 1959 Chicago, the Younger family is expecting a life insurance check of $10,000 after the death of Walter Lee’s father. Walter Lee, an impoverished limousine driver, wants to invest the money in a liquor store with his partner Bobo, hoping that it will put an end to his wife Ruth and son Travis' financial troubles while his sister Beneatha, who had recently accepted a date with a prosperous neighbor, George Murchinson, intends to use it to pay her medical school tuition. Lena, the mother of Walter Lee, who had just quit her job, would rather spend it on a house she and her deceased husband Walter Lee Sr. "Big Walter" dreamed of.

At the Green Hat club, Walter Lee and Bobo discuss opening their liquor store when Willy Harris, a friend, chips in by telling them how they can get a business license from people in Springfield and that they could move the business near the Green Hat, with Walter Lee and Bobo agreeing. The next day, Beneatha and Lena discover that Ruth has been pregnant for two months, with Ruth fearing for their financial issues as the new child would add to them. Beneatha invites Joseph over, who gives her some Nigerian music and a wrapper and an invite to dinner on Monday. Thinking that he has feelings for her, Beneatha scorns him. Later on, the check arrives, to Beneatha, Lena, Ruth, and Travis' joy, only for that joy to end when Walter Lee tells Lena about his future liquor business, much to Lena's dismay, who informs him of Ruth being pregnant and planning to get an abortion. Although Lena is against abortion, Walter Lee voices no objection to it.

Later that night, Beneatha dresses Nigerian for a date with George Murchinson. George calls her out for being "eccentric" and boasts about how her heritage means nothing, when Walter Lee comes in, noticing George and rants about how he has it made. Just then, Lena comes in, telling them that she spent the money on a house in Clybourne Park, to everyone's joy except for Walter.

The next day, Lena receives a call from Mrs. Arnold, the wife of Walter Lee's employer about him missing work, prompting Lena to find him. Lena finds Walter Lee at the Green Hat, and he reluctantly returns. Meanwhile, Ruth tries to get an abortion with help from Miss Tilly, who works at a salon. Discovering how the process works, Ruth changes her mind and leaves. At a café, Lena reveals to Walter Lee that she spent $3,500 for the house, leaving Walter Lee with $6,500. She tells Walter to deposit $3,000 for Beneatha's tuition and take the remain $3,500 for himself.

The next day, the Youngers explore the new house, much to their white neighbors' disgust. A man from the Clybourne Park Improvement Association named Karl Lindner arrives to offer the Youngers money in return for staying away, but they refuse the deal. Just then, Bobo arrives and has a private talk with Walter Lee, revealing that he gave all of the money to Willy and that Willy never showed up at the train station. Walter comes back in, revealing that all the money is gone, to everyone's shock.

Later, Joseph arrives and consoles Beneatha, which she and the rest of the Youngers are back at the apartment. As Ruth tries to persuade a now hopeless Lena that they can still afford the house, Walter arrives, explaining how life is divided between "the takers and the tooken," which is why he made a call to Karl so he can receive more money from him for the house. When Lindner arrives to sign the papers, Walter Lee has a change of heart and calls off the deal, telling him that they will move into the house. The Youngers get ready to move into their new home.

== Cast ==
- Sean Combs as Walter Lee Younger, a man who works as a chauffeur and the husband of Ruth and father of Travis, who seeks to give his family a better life.
- Sanaa Lathan as Beneatha Younger, Walter Lee's sister who aspires to be a doctor and often enjoys making Walter Lee's life unsettling.
- Audra McDonald as Ruth Younger, Walter Lee's long-suffering wife and the mother of Travis.
- Phylicia Rashad as Lena Younger, the widowed sensible mother of Walter Lee and Beneatha who works as a maid.
- Justin Martin as Travis Younger, Walter Lee and Ruth's son.
- Bill Nunn as Bobo, Walter Lee's business partner and friend.
- David Oyelowo as Joseph Asagai, Beneatha's Nigerian teacher.
- Ron Cephas Jones as Willy Harris, a friend of Walter Lee and Bobo who is also the former's business partner.
- Sean Patrick Thomas as George Murchison, a cocky rich college student who is Beneatha's suitor and does not believe in the future of women in other fields.
- John Stamos as Karl Lindner, a man who works at the Clybourne Park Improvement Association.
- Sandi Ross as Earline Johnson
- Rudy Webb as Mr Johnson
- Martin Roach as Walter Lee Sr
- Paul Stephen and Rosemary Dunsmore as Mr. and Mrs. Arnold (respectively), Walter Lee's employer and the wife of Mr. Arnold respectively.
- Yanna McIntosh as Miss Tilly, a friend of Ruth's who works at a salon and wants to help her with the abortion.
- Morgan Freeman as the narrator; uncredited

== Production notes ==
The title was inspired by poet Langston Hughes' reflection on whether a deferred dream "dr[ies] up like a raisin in the sun."

Sean Combs, Audra McDonald, Phylicia Rashad, and Sanaa Lathan reprised the roles they played in the 2004 Broadway revival, which also was directed by Kenny Leon. It ran at the Royale Theatre for 31 previews and 89 performances. McDonald and Rashad both won the Tony Award and Drama Desk Award for their performances, and Lathan was honored with the prestigious Theatre World Award.

== Critical reception ==
In his review in Variety, Dennis Harvey said, "Strong performances and a brisk pace downplay the original script's more dated, preachy aspects. No one will mistake this well-produced but inevitably dialogue-driven piece for pure cinema, but Leon and adapter Paris Qualles open up the play just enough to avoid the usual stage-to-screen claustrophobia. Mervyn Warren's score is a bit more earnest and old-fashioned than would be ideal for this essentially faithful yet refreshed take on a dramatic golden oldie."

James Greenberg of The Hollywood Reporter said, "A Raisin in the Sun never totally transcends its origins on the stage and it's a long way from cutting edge cinema. But those who can relax into the leisurely pace and lush language will be rewarded with an earnest and moving night at the movies. As he did on stage, Leon gets the most out of his actors and with Hansberry's words, that's what carries the film. Rashad beautifully captures the wounded pride and hopes of the older generation, while the rapper and music entrepreneur Combs holds his own in his first major movie role. Balanced between her mother-in-law's idealism and her husband's pragmatism is Walter's wife Ruth, who may be getting the worst of both worlds. McDonald gives the role a heartbreaking dimension."

In The Wall Street Journal, Drothy Rabinowitz observed the three-hour production "flies by with lightning speed - and that cast led by Ms. Rashad as Lena, is no small part of the reason. Ms. McDonald is heartbreaking as Ruth, desperate to understand her husband's descent into misery, and Mr. Combs, who portrays that husband, delivers a sterling performance."

Joanne Ostrow of the Denver Post said, "Overall, this Raisin is a proud, important addition to the history of stage adaptations for TV, one that could touch many more millions of people than ever saw the play, thanks both to its star power and the reach of the medium."

In Entertainment Weekly, Ken Tucker rated the production B+ and called it "a model of subtle adaptation."

== Awards and nominations ==
Year	Award	Category	Nominee(s)	Result	Ref.
2008	Humanitas Prize	Sundance Feature Film	Paris Qualles	Won	
2008	Online Film & Television Association Awards	Best Motion Picture		Won	
2008	Online Film & Television Association Awards	Best Actress in a Motion Picture or Miniseries	Phylicia Rashad	Won	
2008	Online Film & Television Association Awards	Best Supporting Actress in a Motion Picture or Miniseries	Audra McDonald	Won	
2008	Online Film & Television Association Awards	Best Direction of a Motion Picture or Miniseries	Kenny Leon	Nominated	
2008	Online Film & Television Association Awards	Best Writing of a Motion Picture or Miniseries	Paris Qualles	Won	
2008	Online Film & Television Association Awards	Best Ensemble in a Motion Picture or Miniseries		Nominated	
2008	Online Film & Television Association Awards	Best Costume Design in a Motion Picture or Miniseries		Nominated	
2008	Primetime Emmy Awards	Outstanding Made for Television Movie	Craig Zadan, Neil Meron, Sean Combs, Carl Rumbaugh, Susan Batson, David Binder, and John M. Eckert	Nominated	
2008	Primetime Emmy Awards	Outstanding Lead Actress in a Miniseries or a Movie	Phylicia Rashad	Nominated	
2008	Primetime Emmy Awards	Outstanding Supporting Actress in a Miniseries or a Movie	Audra McDonald	Nominated	
2008	Satellite Awards	Best Actress in a Miniseries or Motion Picture Made for Television	Phylicia Rashad	Nominated	
2008	Television Critics Association Awards	Outstanding Achievement in Movies, Miniseries and Specials		Nominated	
2009	Christopher Awards	Television & Cable		Won	
2009	Directors Guild of America Awards	Outstanding Directorial Achievement in Movies for Television or Miniseries	Kenny Leon	Nominated	
2009	Golden Globe Awards	Best Miniseries or Television Film		Nominated	
2009	Golden Reel Awards	Best Sound Editing – Long Form Music in Television	Joanie Diener	Nominated	
2009	NAACP Image Awards	Outstanding Television Movie, Mini-Series or Dramatic Special		Won	
2009	NAACP Image Awards	Outstanding Actor in a Television Movie, Mini-Series or Dramatic Special	Sean Combs	Won	
2009	NAACP Image Awards	Outstanding Actor in a Television Movie, Mini-Series or Dramatic Special	Sean Patrick Thomas	Nominated	
2009	NAACP Image Awards	Outstanding Actress in a Television Movie, Mini-Series or Dramatic Special	Sanaa Lathan	Nominated	
2009	NAACP Image Awards	Outstanding Actress in a Television Movie, Mini-Series or Dramatic Special	Audra McDonald	Nominated	
2009	NAACP Image Awards	Outstanding Actress in a Television Movie, Mini-Series or Dramatic Special	Phylicia Rashad	Won	
2009	NAACP Image Awards	Outstanding Writing in a Motion Picture (Theatrical or Television)	Paris Qualles	Nominated	
2009	Producers Guild of America Awards	David L. Wolper Award for Outstanding Producer of Long-Form Television	Craig Zadan, Neil Meron, Sean Combs, and John M. Eckert	Nominated	
2009	Screen Actors Guild Awards	Outstanding Performance by a Female Actor in a Miniseries or Television Movie	Phylicia Rashad	Nominated	
2009	Young Artist Awards	Best Performance in a TV Movie, Miniseries or Special – Leading Young Actor	Justin Martin	Nominated	
