= Michael Gigante =

Michael Gigante (born June 27, 1969) is an American record producer, songwriter and composer. Gigante’s work includes collaborations with John Stamos, Andy Allo, Esthero, Taylor Coliee, Jordan Michael, THMPSN. and Diamond Carter. He’s collaborated with and produced various songs for Monica Ortiz, along with Charlie Lowell of Jars of Clay

== Early life ==
Michael Gigante was born on June 27, 1969, in Brooklyn, New York. He began taking piano lessons at the age of 12 and started writing songs a few years later, which led to him starting a band called The Peaces in New York City with brothers Brian and Bruce Halverson, Paul Stingo, and his own brother John Gigante.

== Career ==
After moving to Los Angeles, he scored the independent film, Cugini, starring Burt Young, written and directed by his brother. That same year he released an album with LoveStarDeluxe. After a winding path of various music and non-music related jobs, he began working with Diamond Carter in 2011. He produced and collaborated on Pink Balloon, Diamond Carter’s freshman release. That album featured the songs What If Nothing Changes, which ended up on MTV’s Teen Mom 2, and Let Yourself Be Loved, which Gigante wrote with Diamond Carter and John Stamos. Gigante produced the music video for Let Yourself Be Loved with John Stamos directing. This eventually started a back and forth affair with Nashville, Tennessee. In Nashville and Los Angeles, Gigante collaborated and produced songs with Taylor Coliee. He’s played keys for Andy Allo on her One Step Closer EP, and has collaborated with Esthero, THMPSN, Jordan Michael, Charlie Lowell of Jars of Clay, the latter of which he co-wrote When Heaven Can’t Wait along with Monica Ortiz for her album Journey Home. He’s also written Sativa and London Never with Taylor Coliee, the latter featuring John Stamos on drums, tracked at Studio City Sound, in Los Angeles.

In 2017, Gigante created the Dreamy Sugar lullaby brand, releasing its debut album, 80's for Babies, reimagining popular songs as orchestral lullabies.

In 2026, Gigante co-wrote "Take Care of California" with John Stamos and Michael Campion. Released under the artist names Cool New People, John Stamos and Richard Marx, the recording features Mickey Raphael on harmonica and Waylon Payne on background harmonies.

== Awards ==
Gigante was credited as an original music composer in The Grand Scheme: Snatching Sinatra, Episode 10: "The Rights" (~38:57). In 2022, the podcast won a Webby Award for Original Music Score / Best Sound Design.
