= Interpolation (classical music) =

Unrelated material inserted between two logically succeeding functions

For music of the Classical period, "interpolation" is defined in the context of a musical sentence or period as "unrelated material inserted between two logically succeeding functions".

This device is commonly used to extend what would normally be a regular phrase into an irregular and extended phrase. Such expansion by interpolation is achieved by the addition of extra music in the middle of a phrase (commonly through the use of sequence).

Formerly, in the sung portions of the Mass, such as the introit or kyrie, it was permissible, especially during the medieval period, to amplify a liturgical formula by interpolating a "farse" (from Medieval Latin farsa, forcemeat), also called "trope". This might consist of an explanatory phrase or verse, usually in the form of an addition or paraphrase, often in the vernacular.

Interpolation (also known as replayed), especially in 20th-century music and later, is an abrupt change of musical elements, with the (almost immediate) resumption of the main theme or idea. Pieces that are cited as featuring interpolation, among other techniques, are Music for Brass Quintet by Gunther Schuller and Threnody to the Victims of Hiroshima by Krzysztof Penderecki (both 1960–61).

== See also ==
- Interpolation (popular music)
