= Footloose (disambiguation) =

Footloose is a 1984 musical film.

Footloose may also refer to:

- Footloose (1984 soundtrack)
  - "Footloose" (song), performed by Kenny Loggins
- Footloose (2011 film), a remake of the 1984 film
  - Footloose (2011 soundtrack)
- Footloose (musical), a 1998 stage adaptation of the film
- Footloose (professional wrestling), the tag team comprising Toshiaki Kawada and Hiromichi Fuyuki
- Footloose!, a 1963 album by jazz pianist Paul Bley
- Footloose (G.I. Joe), a fictional character in the G.I. Joe universe
- "Footloose" (My Hero), a 2006 television episode
- Footloose industry, a term for industry that isn't limited by certain environmental or spatial concerns that limit other kinds of industries
