= Loverboy Classics =

Compilation album by Loverboy

Greatest hits album by Loverboy
- Released: October 11, 1994
- Recorded: 1980–1987
- Genres: Rock; Hard rock Pop rock
- Length: 1:11:02
- Label: Columbia/Legacy
- Producer: Bruce Fairbairn

Loverboy chronology
Big Ones (1989)	Loverboy Classics (1994)	Temperature's Rising (1995)

Professional ratings
Review scores
Source	Rating
Allmusic	4.5/5 stars

Loverboy Classics is a compilation album by the Canadian rock band Loverboy, released on October 11, 1994. In 1998, the album was certified Gold by the RIAA for shipments of half a million copies.

The album covered more ground than the previous compilation album Big Ones, and outsold it by far as well, but it still doesn't contain their 1983 #34 U.S. hit "Queen of the Broken Hearts".

== Track listing ==
No.	Title	Writer(s)	Original Album	Length
1.	"Turn Me Loose"	Paul Dean; Mike Reno	Loverboy	5:38
2.	"Working for the Weekend"	Dean; Reno; Matt Frenette	Get Lucky	3:41
3.	"Take Me to the Top"	Dean; Reno; Doug Johnson	Get Lucky	6:13
4.	"The Kid Is Hot Tonite"	Dean; Bernie Aubin	Loverboy	4:28
5.	"This Could Be the Night"	Dean; Reno; Jonathan Cain; Bill Wray	Lovin' Every Minute of It	4:58
6.	"Jump"	Dean; Reno; Frenette; Bryan Adams; Jim Vallance	Get Lucky	3:38
7.	"Lovin' Every Minute of It"	Robert John Lange	Lovin' Every Minute of It	3:33
8.	"Notorious"	Dean; Reno; Jon Bon Jovi; Todd Cerney; Richie Sambora	Wildside	4:40
9.	"Almost Paradise"	Dean Pitchford; Eric Carmen	Footloose: Original Soundtrack	3:50
10.	"Lucky Ones"	Dean; Reno; Scott Smith; Denise Thurlow	Get Lucky	3:51
11.	"Destination Heartbreak"	Dean; Reno; Smith; Wray	Lovin' Every Minute of It	4:46
12.	"Hot Girls in Love"	Dean; Bruce Fairbairn	Keep It Up	4:01
13.	"When It's Over"	Dean; Reno	Get Lucky	5:07
14.	"It's Your Life"	Dean; Reno; Frenette; Johnson; Smith	Get Lucky	4:03
15.	"Gangs in the Street"	Dean; Reno	Get Lucky	4:32
16.	"Heaven in Your Eyes"	Dean; Reno; John Dexter; Mae Moore	Top Gun: Original Soundtrack	4:03
Total length:				1:11:02

== Personnel ==
- Mike Reno – lead vocals
- Paul Dean – guitar, backing vocals
- Doug Johnson – keyboards
- Scott Smith – bass
- Matt Frenette – drums
- Nancy Nash – backing vocals
- Bruce Fairbairn – producer
