= Somebody's Eyes =

- 7" promo single picture sleeve

Single by Karla Bonoff

from the album Footloose: Original Soundtrack of the Paramount Motion Picture
- Released: 1984
- Genre: Soft rock
- Length: 3:33
- Label: Columbia
- Songwriter(s): Tom Snow; Dean Pitchford
- Producer(s): John Boylan

“Somebody's Eyes” is a song from the 1984 movie Footloose and featured on its soundtrack whose lyrics were written by Dean Pitchford, who wrote the film's screenplay and source story, and whose music was composed by Tom Snow. It was later used in the 1998 musical version.

“Somebody's Eyes” was originally sung by Karla Bonoff, and it reached #16 on the US Billboard Adult Contemporary chart in 1984, and #9 on Canada's AC chart, October 6, 1984.

== Overview ==
The movie and musical versions of the song are very different in tone and lyrics. In the movie, it is a soft rock love song (featured on the soundtrack), sung by a girl afraid that her boyfriend's ex still has feelings for him, and will interfere with their relationship (the refrain in this song is "Love is no disguise/From Somebody's Eyes"). In the musical adaptation, it is a plot-driven song, sung by the characters Rusty Pizzolo, Wendy Jo and Urleen to Ren McCormack, about the strict rules and morality that pervades the town of Bomont (refrain here being: "You've got no disguise/From Somebody's Eyes").

== Personnel ==
- Karla Bonoff - vocals, background vocals
- Tom Snow - fender rhodes
- Alan Pasqua - synthesizer
- Nathan East - bass
- Michael Landau - guitar
- Michael Botts - percussion
- Wendy Waldman - background vocals
