= Sing (1989 film) =

1989 film by Richard Baskin

- Theatrical release poster
- Directed by: Richard J. Baskin
- Written by: Dean Pitchford
- Produced by: Craig Zadan
- Starring: Lorraine Bracco; Peter Dobson; Jessica Steen; Louise Lasser; George DiCenzo; Patti LaBelle
- Cinematography: Peter Sova
- Edited by: Jere Huggins; Bud S. Smith; M. Scott Smith
- Music by: Jay Gruska
- Distributed by: Tri-Star Pictures
- Release date: March 31, 1989
- Running time: 98 minutes
- Country: United States
- Language: English
- Budget: $11.5 million
- Box office: $2.3 million

Sing is a 1989 American musical drama film directed by Richard J. Baskin, written by Dean Pitchford (who also co-wrote the songs) and produced by Craig Zadan (both previously collaborated on Footloose), and starring Lorraine Bracco, Peter Dobson, and Jessica Steen.

The film follows a fictional New York City SING! production. The supporting cast includes Louise Lasser, George DiCenzo, Patti LaBelle, Yank Azman, Ingrid Veninger, and Cuba Gooding Jr.

Sing was released in the United States on March 31, 1989. It received mixed reviews from critics and was a box office bomb, grossing only $2.3 million from an $11.5 million budget.

== Plot ==
The story begins with Hannah, a beautiful young teen, as she is completing her senior year of high school. Her Brooklyn neighborhood is falling apart and SING! is one of the only traditions that keep the neighborhood alive. Newly arrived teacher, Miss Lombardo grew up in the neighborhood and returned to be their SING! leader. One cold Christmas night, Miss Lombardo is leaving a neighborhood party when a young man hails her a cab, then attempts to mug her. In self-defense, she bites his hand to release his grip and he screams in pain and terror and flees. The cab driver jokes about not starting the meter yet.

On the first day back at school, Miss Lombardo runs into difficulty when her students are uninterested and misbehaved. One such student, named Dominic, gets scolded for bringing stolen watches to school and putting his feet up on the desk. On the day of SING! leader elections, Miss Lombardo recognizes Dominic as her mugger by the bandage on his hand and decides to blackmail him into being co-SING! leader of the Senior class along with Hannah, who was rightfully elected. The school kids work hard to plan their SING! productions. Hannah and Dominic clash along the way as Hannah uses traditional SING! planning strategies while Dominic wants to introduce the flavor of the youth in the neighborhood. In order to put Dominic and Hannah on the same page, Miss Lombardo suggests that Hannah accompany Dominic to a local club. At first, the two are equally hesitant but Hannah agrees on the terms that it is not a date.

However, by the end of the night, Hannah uses Dominic to make her ex-boyfriend, Mickey, jealous, and due to this, Hannah and Dominic start seeing each other in a different light. Dominic accompanies Hannah on her walk home and the two share a romantic kiss. Once the two are finally uniting and getting along, the Dept. of Education informs the school that it will close forever at the end of the semester and therefore, there won't be enough resources for them to complete this year's SING!. This fuels the kids to work even harder on their productions and the neighborhood comes together even more to help finance the show, despite the school authorities' ban.

Just as things are starting to look up, Dominic reluctantly accompanies his brother on a robbery of Hannah's mother's diner, their sole source of income which already was at risk of failure due to the school's upcoming closure. A classmate sees Dominic standing outside the diner at the time of the crime and informs Hannah about it. Devastated, Hannah confronts Dominic and he promises to get the money back for her. He then steals the money from his brother and returns it to the diner, restoring Hannah's faith in him. The recent events have discouraged Dominic from fulfilling his co-SING! leader duties and he had been skipping out on rehearsals. In a moment of great need as the senior's main performer is injured and knocked unconscious, Dominic steps in to save the show. He sheds his bad-boy demeanor and exceeds all expectations. The underclassmen and seniors perform to a record-high sold-out audience. At the end of the show, Hannah makes a moving speech motivating the community to rejoice and always remember that despite compromising circumstances, they completed a successful SING! and proved their community's worth.

== Cast ==
- Lorraine Bracco as Miss Lombardo
- Peter Dobson as Dominic
- Jessica Steen as Hannah Gottschalk
- Louise Lasser as Rosie
- George DiCenzo as Mr. Marowitz
- Patti LaBelle as Mrs. DeVere
- Susan Peretz as Mrs. Tucci
- Laurnea Wilkerson as Zena
- Rachel Sweet as Cecelia, Singer
- Scott Wentworth as Freddy
- David Coury as Mickey
- Yank Azman as Mr. Frye (credited as Jank Azman)
- Jason Blicker as Ari
- Cuba Gooding Jr. as Stanley
- Sam Moses as Murray Bloom
- Ingrid Veninger as Naomi
- Leonard Chow as Wilson
- Craig Hempsted as Romeo
- Randy Lutterman as Clarissa
- Mario Marenco as Cyril (credited as Mario Marengo)
- Marilyn Peppiatt as Mrs. Simonides
- Corinne Promislow as Janine
- Rino Romano as "Blade"
- Phillip Jarrett as Stan (credited as Phil Jarrett)
- Gino Marrocco as Mr. Abaidi
- Lou Pitoscia as Lou, The Janitor
- Doug Bain as Mr. Tucci
- Catherine Oppenheimer as Cujette
- Elena Kudaba as Grandma
- Peter Manierka as Grandpa

== Soundtrack ==
1. Mickey Thomas - "Sing" (Dean Pitchford, Jonathan Cain, Martin Page) 4:52
2. Johnny Kemp - "Birthday Suit" (Dean Pitchford, Rhett Lawrence) 4:30
3. Paul Carrack & Terri Nunn - "Romance (Love Theme from Sing)" (Dean Pitchford, Patrick Leonard, Paul Carrack) 4:30
4. Nia Peeples - "You Don't Have To Ask Me Twice" (Dean Pitchford, Tom Snow) 3:35
5. Michael Bolton with the cast of Sarafina! - "One More Time" (Dean Pitchford, Tom Snow) 4:48
6. Bill Champlin - "Somethin' To Believe In" (Dean Pitchford, Desmond Child, Diane Warren) 3:29
7. Patti LaBelle - "Total Concentration" (Dean Pitchford, Billy Steinberg, Tom Kelly) 3:56
8. Kevin Cronin - "(Everybody's Gotta) Face The Music" (Dean Pitchford, Richard Marx) 4:10
9. Laurneá Wilkerson - "What's The Matter With Love?" (Dean Pitchford, Tom Snow) 3:57
10. Art Garfunkel - "We'll Never Say Goodbye" (Dean Pitchford, Tom Snow) 2:57
