= Footloose (musical) =

1998 musical

- Playbill cover
- Music: Tom Snow
- Lyrics: Dean Pitchford
- Book: Dean Pitchford; Walter Bobbie
- Basis: Footloose
- Productions: 1998 Broadway; 2000 US tour 2003 US tour 2003 Australia; 2004 UK tour 2006 UK tour 2006 West End; 2007 UK tour 2007 West End; 2008 US tour 2016 UK tour 2017 UK tour 2017 West End revival

Footloose is a 1998 musical based on the 1984 film of the same name. The music is by Tom Snow (among others), the lyrics by Dean Pitchford (with additional lyrics by Kenny Loggins), and the book by Pitchford and Walter Bobbie. Lighting design by Ken Billington.

== Plot ==
=== Act 1 ===
Ren McCormack, an ordinary city teenager living in Chicago, IL, dances off the stresses from his long and arduous eight-hour work day at a dance club with friends. But this is his last visit; he tells them, due to financial pressures brought on by his father's abandonment, he and his mother Ethel have to move to a small town in the middle of nowhere: Bomont (much to the chagrin of his friends, who gripe, "Bomont?! Where the hell is Bomont?!"), where his aunt and uncle have offered them a place to stay. After arriving in town, Ren and Ethel attend church and get their first glimpse of the Reverend, Shaw Moore. A deeply religious, conservative man and a prominent authority figure in the town, Moore gives a long sermon lambasting the evils of "rock and roll" music and its "endless chant of pornography" ("Footloose/On Any Sunday").

After church, Ren immediately finds himself at odds with the repressive, stifling atmosphere in Bomont and meets Ariel, the Reverend's daughter and only person seemingly unfazed by her father's iron-fisted control. Ariel quickly dismisses Ren and runs off to a gas station where she meets her boyfriend Chuck Cranston, the local bad boy, and his buddies Travis and Lyle ("The Girl Gets Around"). While attempting to give Ariel her forgotten jacket, Rev. Moore catches Chuck with his hands around his daughter, much to his displeasure.

The next day at his new school, Ren accidentally bumps into Willard Hewitt, a slow-witted cowboy with strong loyalty to his mother, who decides to beat him up. Ren charms him and the two become friends. Ren, annoyed by how little there is to do in town, tells Willard about his exciting life in Chicago and starts to dance in the school's hallway ("I Can't Stand Still"). Willard tries to stop him, but Ren ignores his protests and puts on a show in front of everyone, including the school's principal, who angrily explains to him that dancing is illegal in the town of Bomont. Willard quickly comes to Ren's defense, explaining he is new in town and does not know the rules. As the hallway clears, Ren is introduced to Ariel's best friends: Rusty, Wendy Jo and Urleen. Rusty flirts with her crush, Willard, telling him how brave he is to have stood up to the principal on Ren's behalf. The girls explain to a bemused Ren that dancing in Bomont is, in fact, illegal; years ago, after a horrifying car accident killed four kids returning from a dance in a neighboring county, Moore became extremely righteous and campaigned to pass a law forbidding all residents from dancing. They warn him to lie low unless he wants to get into even more trouble than he already is. Unfortunately for Ren, his reputation has preceded him; the adults in town begin turn on him, leading to his uncle Wes slapping him after Ren loses his part time job ("Somebody's Eyes").

After a night out with Chuck, Ariel returns home to her mother, Vi, and a disgruntled Shaw, who stubbornly ignores Ariel's repeated attempts to get him to engage in conversation. Exasperated, she leaves the room in a huff. Alone with his wife, Shaw expresses his concern over Ariel's rebellion and her relationship with Chuck, but when Vi attempts to advocate for her daughter and to assure him the fling will soon cool down, he silences her and storms off to finish writing his sermon. Vi, upset with not having a voice in her life, and Ethel, dealing with her new life circumstances, particularly after being forced into silence after her son is slapped, unknowingly commiserate with each other. They are joined by Ariel, and the three, each alone, lament how they have to stifle themselves and their opinions ("Learning to be Silent").

After school the next day, Ariel, Rusty, Wendy Jo, and Urleen do their homework at the Burger Blast, a local restaurant. Ren, now an employee there and dressed in his uniform, complete with roller skates, discusses his woes with Willard and questions him about his relationship with Rusty; he thinks she is very good-looking, but is confused by her non-stop talking. When Ren takes Ariel's order, she flirts with him, but Willard warns Ren that Chuck Cranston would not be happy if the two became involved. Ariel talks with her friends about how she wants to find a decent guy; one that will fight for her ("Holding Out for a Hero"). After Ariel realizes she's late to meet Chuck, he shows up in a fury and tries to force her to leave with him. Though Ren comes to her defense, it's Betty Blast, the restaurant owner, who ultimately breaks up the fight. Chuck storms off and Ren assumes he'll be fired again, but Betty tells him to come back tomorrow.

Ariel, impressed with Ren after standing up to Chuck, takes him out to a field to see a passing train after he gets off work, where they open up to each other. Ariel tells him how her father was before the accident and her future plans, while Ren details how his father left his family. Upon Ariel's advice, he yells his grievances to the train as it passes. Unbeknownst to them, Chuck witnesses the pair together.

Afterwards, Ariel and Ren walk back to her house, which catches Moore and Vi by surprise, as they had believed Ariel had been at home in her room while they hosted a bridge game downstairs. On top of Shaw's displeasure at his daughter's disobedience, a nervous Ren unintentionally insults him in an attempt to ease his worries, making the situation more awkward and causing all of Shaw's friends to dash off. As Ren leaves, an irritated Shaw sternly orders Ariel to cease her visits with him, but Ariel retaliates, claiming that all he is doing is making her feel like a prisoner. After a fed up daughter and wife storm off, Shaw begins to feel a pang of guilt, pondering whether he is being fair to his daughter and the problematic task of being both a preacher and a father ("Heaven Help Me").

At school the next day, Ren shows up late to gym class with Ariel and Willard after being jumped by Chuck. They try to explain this to the Coach, but he ignores their protests and punishes the entire class with fifty push-ups each. Ren laments that the citizens of Bomont are so "wound up", muttering that at least in Chicago, he had the clubs to turn to in times of stress, to which Willard jokingly suggests that they "should take the coach dancing." Ren realizes that throwing a dance would be the perfect way to alleviate the teenagers' pressures, while at the same time making a statement to Moore and the town council. Ren reveals his plan to Ariel and all of his classmates, eventually winning them over. Word of this reaches Moore, who, as the one responsible for banning dancing to begin with, is determined to do anything within his power to ensure that a dance does not happen ("I'm Free/Heaven Helps The Man").

=== Act 2 ===
Ren, Ariel, Willard and Rusty visit a dance hall in neighboring town, where they listen and dance to a live country band ("Still Rockin’"). Rusty repeatedly attempts to dance with Willard, but he weasels his way out, dragging Ren off to the bar to get drinks, where he explains that he doesn't know how to dance. Rusty overhears them, as do several cowboys, who begin to mock Willard. Rusty comes to his defense, saying that he might not be perfect, but she loves him anyway. Ren tries to teach Willard to dance, who after much initial stumbling and apprehension whips off an amazing dance combination, much to Rusty's surprise ("Let's Hear it for the Boy").

Chuck shows up at the Moores' home, looking for Ariel, and is caught by Shaw and Vi. As Chuck leaves, he tells them that Ariel is not where they think she is. When Ariel returns home, pretending she was at her friend's house studying, her parents reveal that they know she wasn't there. The argument between Shaw and Ariel starts to boil over and Vi attempts to intervene, but when Ariel suggests Shaw doesn't listen to anyone, he slaps her. Ariel runs off, leaving Shaw deeply shaken. Vi tries to console him, but urges that his reprimanding is not all that logical ("Can You Find it in Your Heart?").

Meanwhile, Ren, Willard and their friends try to find a way to present their idea to the town council. Ren shows them a speech he's prepared, as a rap ("Dancing Is Not A Crime"), but his friends aren't too sure about it. Ren, extremely discouraged, considers forgetting the whole idea. Willard shares with Ren some advice from his beloved mother: "You can't back down" ("Mama Says/Mama Says Encore"). Just as Ren's confidence has been restored, Ariel arrives, revealing she has just been beat up by Chuck, leaving her with a black eye. While Ariel tells everyone to leave her alone, Ren breaks through her defenses and comforts her. Ariel takes Ren to a hidden spot under a train bridge. There, Ren finds her poetry written on the walls and Ariel admits who she wrote them for: her deceased brother, Bobby, one of the kids who died in the car accident after the dance years ago. Ariel tells Ren how, in his grief over the loss of his son, Shaw shut down, and convinced himself banning dancing was the only way to "save" the town. She also gives Ren a Bible marked with various passages he can use for his motion. It is then they both realize they've fallen in love with each other ("Almost Paradise").

At the town council meeting, Ren stands up and attempts to explain his reasoning to the council, which includes the principal, coach, his aunt & uncle, and Moore. After he is quickly shot down by the council, Vi stands up for him, forcing the room to listen to his claim. Using direct quotes from the Bible, Ren argues that dancing is a profound, ancient, and historically religious celebration of life, and therefore, shouldn't be illegal. Ren is favorably supported by the crowd, particularly his fellow students, but the council, under pressure from Shaw, refuse to listen and the motion is unanimously dismissed.

After the meeting, Ethel explains to Ren that Shaw had those votes locked no matter what, and she suggests that Ren go talk to him face to face. Ren, now at the Moore home, tells Shaw he is taking his anguish over his son's death out on the entire town. They have a heated argument, but when Ren points out that they're both dealing with grief — Moore's loss of his son, Ren's loss of his father — Shaw is struck by Ren's insight, moving him. Ren leaves and Ariel joins Shaw downstairs. The two share a tender moment; Ariel tells Shaw that she believes in him and gives him a long, meaningful hug. She leaves, reminding him about his sermon in the morning. Shaw struggles with his actions and what to do next. ("Heaven Help Me Reprise")

At the next service, Shaw informs the whole congregation that he is giving the teenagers his blessing to hold a dance, ultimately abolishing the law. They are overjoyed. After church, Ren asks Ariel to the dance and Willard invites Rusty, telling her that he is even willing to dance with her. Ariel rejects Chuck, threatening to press charges if he contacts her again. He leaves in a huff, not before Travis and Lyle choose the dance over him. When the crowd leaves, Vi and Shaw are left alone. Shaw asks Vi for her forgiveness and tells her how much he loves her. The two embrace and start to sway, to which Vi remarks, "we're almost dancing" ("Can You Find it in Your Heart? Reprise").

The teenagers finally get their dance, even Shaw, Vi, and all the rest of the townsfolk attend. Together, they all celebrate their newfound freedom and the right to dance ("Footloose (Finale)").

== Songs ==
Act I

- "Footloose/On Any Sunday" – All
- "The Girl Gets Around" – Chuck, Travis, Lyle, and Ariel
- "I Can't Stand Still" – Ren
- "Somebody's Eyes" – Rusty, Urleen, and Wendy Jo
- "Learning to Be Silent" – Vi, Ethel, and Ariel
- "Holding Out for a Hero" – Ariel, Rusty, Urleen, and Wendy Jo
- "Somebody's Eyes (Reprise)" – Rusty, Urleen, and Wendy Jo
- "Heaven Help Me" – Shaw
- "I'm Free (Heaven Helps the Man)" – Ren, Kids & Adults

Act II

- "Still Rockin'" – Cowboy Bob & Band
- "Let's Hear It for the Boy" – Rusty
- "Can You Find it in Your Heart" – Vi
- "Mama Says" – Willard, Bickle, Garvin, Jeter, and Ren
- "Almost Paradise" – Ren and Ariel
- "Dancing Is Not A Crime" – Ren
- "Heaven Help Me (Reprise)" – Shaw
- "Can You Find it in Your Heart? (Reprise)" – Shaw
- "Footloose (Finale)" – All

Revisions

In April 2005, the show was revised slightly. Aside from numerous tweakings to the script, there are slight differences in the revised version's musical numbers:

- New Act II opening, "Still Rockin'"
- Removal of the 'rap' "Dancing is not a Crime". Now only the very first section of the rap is used and right before "Mama Says" instead of during the Town Council meeting. Ren gives a speech instead during the meeting.
- Shaw's song "I Confess" removed and replaced with a much longer scene with Ren after the Town Council meeting and a short reprise of "Heaven Help Me"
- Rusty, Wendy Jo, and Urleen now sing the opening of "Footloose" instead of Ren and the boys
- Ariel now sings with Vi and Ethel during "Learning to be Silent"
- "Mama Says" was shortened and removed Jeter, Bickle, and Garvin's solos

== Instrumentation ==
Footloose requires a pit orchestra in a rock combo style. The instrumentation calls for two keyboards (with one keyboardist doubling as MD), two guitars, bass guitar, drums, percussion, and a woodwind player. The woodwind player doubles on clarinet, flute, tenor sax, and baritone sax. In the original Broadway production, there was also music for solo violin and cello.

== Productions ==
=== Broadway production ===
The musical Footloose opened at Broadway's Richard Rodgers Theatre on October 22, 1998 and ran for 709 performances until July 2, 2000. It was directed by Walter Bobbie with choreography by AC Ciulla.

Footloose received mixed critical reception. General consensus was that the show was in and of itself poor, but the music and talented cast made it entertaining. It was nominated for four Tony Awards. The wardrobe is on display at the Costume World Broadway Collection in Pompano Beach, Florida.

=== Original London production ===
A London production, billed as both Footloose: The Musical and simply Footloose in different press accounts, opened at the Novello Theatre on the Strand, following a United Kingdom touring version. It premiered on April 18, 2006, and closed November 11, 2006. Directed by Karen Bruce, the creative team included Morgan Large designing sets and costumes, James Whiteside as lighting designer, and Mike Dixon and Chris Egan as musical supervisors.

=== British national tours ===
Footloose, directed by Paul Kerryson, premiered in the UK at the Theatre Royal, Plymouth in February 2004, where it played for three weeks before embarking on a 24-week national tour. A second UK national tour opened on January 4, 2006, at the Wales Millennium Centre in Cardiff Bay. This time directed by Karen Bruce, it starred Cheryl Baker and Stephen McGann and went on to tour another 11 venues mainly in the south of England and Scotland.

The production transferred into London's West End, starring David Essex and Cheryl Baker in April 2006, before closing in November of the same year – due to the limited availability of the Novello Theatre. The production then embarked its third national tour, which opened in Salford in January 2007, and continued until July 2007, starring Lyn Paul. Then the cast returned to London at the Playhouse Theatre from August 17, 2007 through December 6, 2007; Lyn Paul continued her role. Footloose returned to the West End in September 2017 at the Peacock Theatre with Gareth Gates and Maureen Nolan confirmed to take on the roles of Willard and Vi Moore.

A brand new production of the musical, directed by Racky Plews, returned for a fourth UK & International tour, premiering at the Maag Halle in Zürich on January 19, 2022. It then opened in the UK at the Theatre Royal, Plymouth, in February 2022 and closed in August 2022 at the New Wimbledon Theatre.

A new production in co-production between Pitlochry Festival Theatre and the New Wolsey Theatre opened in May 2024 playing until October 2024.

=== US 10th Anniversary national tour ===
Prather Entertainment Group produced a "10th Anniversary" U.S. tour of Footloose.

== Casts ==
Character	Broadway	US National Tour	UK Tour	West End	UK Tour	10th Anniversary Tour	UK Tour	West End	UK Tour
Character	1998		2004	2006	2007	2008	2016	2017	2022
Ren McCormack	Jeremy Kushnier	Joe Machota	Chris Jarvis	Derek Hough	Steven Webb	Erik Keiser	Luke Baker	Joshua Dowen	Joshua Hawkins
Ariel Moore	Jennifer Laura Thompson	Niki Scalera	Rachael Wooding	Lorna Want	Twinnie Lee Moore	Lindsay Luppino	Hannah Price	Hannah Price	Lucy Munden
Rev. Shaw Moore	Stephen Lee Anderson	Joe Machota	Craig Pinder	Stephen McGann	Richard Grieve	Glenn Wall	Nigel Lister	Reuven Gershon	Darren Day
Vi Moore	Dee Hoty	Mary Gordon Murray	Marilyn Cutts	Cheryl Baker	Maureen Nolan	Katherine Proctor	Maureen Nolan	Maureen Nolan	Holly Ashton
Willard Hewitt	Tom Plotkin	Christian Borle	Taylor James	Giovanni Spano	Simon Lipkin	Michael Kennen Miller	Gareth Gates	Gareth Gates	Luke Friend
Kara "Rusty" Pizzolo	Stacy Francis	Stephanie St. James	Cassidy Janson	Stevie Tate-Bauer	Jodie Jacobs	Kara Guy	Joanna Sawyer	Laura Sillett	Oonagh Cox
Ethel McCormack	Catherine Cox	Marsha Waterbury	Verity Bentham	Caroline Deverill	Lisa Peace	Jennie Hollander	Nicky Swift	Lindsay Keogh	Geri Allen
Chuck Cranston	Billy Hartung	Richard H. Blake	Richard Taylor Woods	Johnny Shentall	Robbie Sotcher	Jeff Blim	Matthew Tomlinson	Connor Going	Tom Mussell
Urleen	Kathy Deitch	Andrea McCormick	Julie McKenna	Natasha McDonald	Tarisha Rommick	Mary-Elizabeth Milton	Miracle Chance	Grace Lai	Samantha Richards
Wendy Jo	Rosalind Brown	Katie Harvey	Lucy Newton	Lisa Gorgin	Claire-Louise Mealor	Sara Catherine Baines	Natasha Brown	Emma Fraser	Jess Barker
Lyle	Jim Ambler	David Patrick Ford	Ian Gareth Jones	Ian Gareth Jones	Ricky Morrell	Alex Jorth	???	???	???
Travis	Bryant Carroll	Andrew A. Knight	Tim Newman	Gavin Alex	Mat Millns	Patrick Joyce	???	???	???
Lulu Warnicker	Catherine Campbell	Tina Johnson	Jennifer Meldrum	???	Michelle Bishop	Elizabeth Loos	Lauren Storer	Lauren Storer	Anna Westlake
Wes Warnicker	Adam LeFevre	Steve Luker	Guy Oliver Watts	Ivan de Freitas	Ryan Quish	Chuck Caruso	Alex Marshall	Alex Marshall	Ben Barrow

== Awards and nominations ==
=== Original Broadway production ===
Year	Award ceremony	Category	Nominee	Result
1999	Tony Award	Best Book of a Musical	Dean Pitchford and Walter Bobbie	Nominated
1999	Tony Award	Best Original Score	Dean Pitchford, Kenny Loggins, Jim Steinman, Eric Carmen, Tom Snow, Sammy Hagar	Nominated
1999	Tony Award	Best Actress in a Musical	Dee Hoty	Nominated
1999	Tony Award	Best Choreography	A.C. Ciulla	Nominated
1999	Outer Critics Circle Award	Outstanding Actor in a Musical	Jeremy Kushnier	Nominated
1999	Outer Critics Circle Award	Outstanding Choreography	A.C. Ciulla	Nominated
1999	Drama League Award	Distinguished Production of a Musical		Nominated
