= Footloose (2011 soundtrack) =

Footloose: Music from the Motion Picture

Soundtrack album by various artists
- Released: September 27, 2011
- Recorded: 2011
- Genre: Pop rock, Hip hop, country
- Length: 44:14
- Label: Atlantic; Warner Music Nashville

Singles from Footloose: Music from the Motion Picture
- 1. "Footloose" Released: November 8, 2011

Footloose: Music from the Motion Picture, the original soundtrack for the 2011 remake of Footloose, was released by Atlantic Records and Warner Music Nashville on September 27, 2011. It includes eight new songs and four remakes of songs from the original film's soundtrack. "Footloose" by Kenny Loggins was covered by Blake Shelton in a country style for the remake. The film includes Loggins's original version of the song as well as "Bang Your Head (Metal Health)" by the heavy metal band Quiet Riot and "Let's Hear It for the Boy", which are not on the soundtrack album. A cover of "Almost Paradise", performed by Victoria Justice and Hunter Hayes, was released on September 22, 2011.

== Track listing ==
No.	Title	Writer(s)	Artist	Length
1.	"Footloose"	Kenny Loggins; Dean Pitchford	Blake Shelton	3:39
2.	"Where the River Goes"	Zac Brown; Wyatt Durrette; Drew Pearson; Anne Preven	Zac Brown	3:39
3.	"Little Lovin'"	Elisabeth Marius; Angelo Petraglia	Lissie	4:30
4.	"Holding Out for a Hero"	Pitchford; Jim Steinman	Ella Mae Bowen	4:21
5.	"Let's Hear It for the Boy"	Pitchford; Tom Snow	Jana Kramer	4:10
6.	"So Sorry Mama"	Whitney Duncan; Gordie Sampson; John Shanks	Whitney Duncan	3:43
7.	"Fake I.D."	John Rich; Shanks	Big & Rich; Gretchen Wilson	3:23
8.	"Almost Paradise"	Eric Carmen; Pitchford	Victoria Justice; Hunter Hayes	3:37
9.	"Walkin' Blues"	R.L. Burnside	CeeLo Green; Kenny Wayne Shepherd	3:48
10.	"Magic in My Home"	Jason Freeman	Jason Freeman	3:13
11.	"Suicide Eyes"	Michael Hobby; Jaren Johnston; William Satcher	A Thousand Horses	3:00
12.	"Dance the Night Away"	Lavell Crump; Christopher Goodman; Pitchford; Rhashida Stafford; Bill Wolfer	David Banner	4:13
Total length:				44:14

== Chart performance ==
=== Weekly charts ===
Chart (2011)	Peak position
Australian Albums (ARIA)	56
Canadian Albums (Billboard)	21
US Billboard 200	14
US Top Country Albums (Billboard)	4
US Soundtrack Albums (Billboard)	1

=== Year-end charts ===
Chart (2011)	Position
US Top Country Albums (Billboard)	64
US Soundtrack Albums (Billboard)	24

Chart (2012)	Position
US Top Country Albums (Billboard)	42
