= Almost Paradise (song) =

"Almost Paradise... Love Theme from Footloose"

Single by Mike Reno and Ann Wilson

from the album Footloose: Original Soundtrack of the Paramount Motion Picture
- B-side: "Strike Zone" (by Loverboy)
- Released: January 31, 1984 (U.S.); March 1984 (Netherlands)
- Recorded: 1983
- Genre: Soft rock
- Length: 3:46
- Label: Columbia
- Songwriters: Eric Carmen (music); Dean Pitchford (lyrics)
- Producer: Keith Olsen

"Almost Paradise... Love Theme from Footloose" is the title of a duet sung by Mike Reno of Loverboy and Ann Wilson of Heart. It is one of several major hits written by singer Eric Carmen with lyricist Dean Pitchford, another being "Make Me Lose Control".

Because both of their respective bands were successful during the 1980s, Reno and Wilson were approached to record a duet for the film Footloose and its accompanying soundtrack.

== Background ==
"Almost Paradise" was one of three top 10 hits on the Billboard Hot 100 chart found on the Footloose soundtrack album; it peaked at No. 7 and spent 13 weeks in the top 40. An alternate version of the song with a slightly different musical arrangement, which has never been released, is used in the film. Other hits from this soundtrack include the film's title track by Kenny Loggins and "Let's Hear It for the Boy" by Deniece Williams, both of which went to No. 1 on the pop chart. "Almost Paradise" was also a hit on the Hot Adult Contemporary Tracks chart in the United States, where it spent one week at No. 1. Both singers Mike Reno and Ann Wilson resumed their respective roles within their bands Loverboy and Heart following this one-off recording.

== Chart performance ==
=== Weekly charts ===
Chart (1984)	Peak position
Australia (Kent Music Report)	52
Canadian RPM Top Singles	3
Canadian RPM Adult Contemporary	2
Paraguay (UPI)	4
US Billboard Hot 100	7
US Adult Contemporary (Billboard)	1
US CHR/Pop Airplay (Radio & Records)	4

=== Year-end charts ===
Chart (1984)	Position
Canada RPM Top Singles	32
US Billboard Hot 100	59

== Personnel ==
Movie Version:

- Mike Reno – vocals
- Ann Wilson – vocals
- Bill Cuomo – keyboards, synthesizers
- Chas Sanford – electric guitars
- Keith Olsen – acoustic guitar, bass
- Jim Keltner – drums
- Jerry Peterson – saxophone

Album Version:

- Mike Reno – vocals
- Ann Wilson – vocals
- Bill Cuomo – keyboards, synthesizers
- Chas Sanford – electric guitars
- Keith Olsen – acoustic guitar, bass
- Jim Keltner – drums

== Cover versions ==
- In 1989, Eric Carmen and Merry Clayton released a cover single, which was performed as part of the Dirty Dancing in Concert live tour.
- In 1998, the Broadway cast of Footloose performed the song, for the 1998 Broadway musical based on the film.
- In 2011, Victoria Justice and Hunter Hayes performed the song, for the 2011 remake of the original film. Their cover was released on September 22, 2011 and was featured on the accompanying soundtrack.
- In 2017, Royce da 5'9, Kxng Crooked, Truth Ali, Iliana Eve, Jonathan Hay, Mike Smith and King Graint all collaborated on "Almost Paradise", a hip-hop interpolation of the original. The song is from The Sins of a Father Playlist compilation and it reached #28 on the Canadian Spotify Charts.
- Around 2018, Mike Reno began performing the song with his band Loverboy with Reno's wife, Cathy St. Germain, taking Ann's place on vocals.

== In popular culture ==
- The use of "Almost Paradise" on the daytime soap opera All My Children was a significant factor in the song's success.
- "Almost Paradise" was also used on the daytime serials Guiding Light and Santa Barbara.
- Beginning with the third season, "Almost Paradise" is used as the opening theme song for the reality television show Bachelor in Paradise.
- Actress Jessica Biel performed an impromptu cover of the song's chorus during an appearance on The Tonight Show with Jay Leno on July 12, 2007.

== See also ==
- List of Hot Adult Contemporary number ones of 1984
