= Footloose (2011 film) =

2011 film by Craig Brewer

- Theatrical release poster
- Directed by: Craig Brewer
- Screenplay by: Craig Brewer; Dean Pitchford
- Story by: Dean Pitchford
- Based on: Characters by Dean Pitchford
- Produced by: Craig Zadan; Neil Meron; Dylan Sellers; Brad Weston
- Starring: Kenny Wormald; Julianne Hough; Andie MacDowell; Dennis Quaid
- Cinematography: Amy Vincent
- Edited by: Billy Fox
- Music by: Deborah Lurie
- Production companies: MTV Films; Spyglass Entertainment; Unique Features; Dylan Sellers; Weston Pictures; Zadan/Meron; Southern Cross the Dog; Storyline Entertainment
- Distributed by: Paramount Pictures
- Release dates: October 6, 2011 (Australia); October 14, 2011 (United States)
- Running time: 113 minutes
- Country: United States
- Language: English
- Budget: $24 million
- Box office: $63.5 million

Footloose is a 2011 American musical drama film directed by Craig Brewer, who co-wrote the screenplay with Dean Pitchford. A remake of the 1984 film, the film stars Kenny Wormald, Julianne Hough, Andie MacDowell, and Dennis Quaid. The film follows a young man who moves from Boston to a small Southern town and protests the town's ban against dancing. Filming took place from September to November 2010 in Georgia.

The film was released in Australia and New Zealand on October 6, 2011, and in North America on October 14, 2011 by Paramount Pictures. The film received mixed reviews and grossed $15.5 million in its opening weekend and $63 million worldwide.

== Plot ==
After a night of partying, an intoxicated Bobby Moore and his friends are killed when their car collides head-on with a truck on a bridge on their way home to the town of Bomont, Georgia. The tragedy prompts his father Shaw Moore, the town reverend, to persuade the city council to pass several draconian laws and ordinances, one of which bans all unsupervised dancing within city limits.

Three years later, Boston-raised teenager Ren McCormack moves to Bomont to live with his uncle Wes Warnicker, his aunt Lulu, and cousins Sarah and Amy after his mother's death from leukemia and his father's desertion. On his first day at Bomont High School, Ren becomes friends with fellow seniors Willard Hewitt and Woody, who explain the ban on dancing.

He is attracted to Shaw's rebellious daughter Ariel, who is secretly dating dirt-track driver Chuck Cranston. After Chuck insults him, Ren ends up in a school bus motocross race and wins despite his inability to drive one and almost getting himself killed when the bus catches fire.

Shaw mistrusts Ren and forbids Ariel from ever seeing him again. Ren and his classmates want to do away with the law against dancing and have a senior prom. He also teaches Willard how to dance.

After a while, Ariel begins to fall for Ren, prompting her father to complain to Ren's uncle, who explains the circumstances of Ren's mother's death and his opinion that while Shaw may think Ariel is too good for Ren, perhaps the opposite is true.

Ariel dumps Chuck, resulting in a fight between them in which Ariel is physically assaulted and gets a black eye. Later in church, Shaw finds out about it and believing Ren responsible, demands his arrest, but Ariel tells him that he cannot blame everything on Ren as he did with Bobby. She then reveals that she lost her virginity, to which Shaw begs for her to not say that in the church, and Ariel sarcastically asks him if he will pass another law, as it did not stop her and Chuck from having sex. Shaw abruptly slaps her without warning, shocking his wife Vi and prompting Ariel to tearfully and angrily criticize his domineering ways and storm out. When Shaw tries to apologize, Vi stops him, telling him he has gone too far. Supporting the dancing movement, she tells him that he is not being good to Ariel; he cannot be everyone's father; and dancing and music are not the problems.

Ren goes before the City Council to request the anti-dancing laws be abolished. As part of his statement, he reads several Bible verses given to him by Ariel, which describe that even in ancient times people would dance to rejoice, exercise, celebrate, or worship. However, Reverend Moore walked into the meeting with the votes to defeat Ren's motion already in his pocket, and it goes down to defeat.

Despite the City Council's refusal to abolish the anti-dancing ordinances, Ren's boss Andy Beamis offers his cotton mill, which is technically in the neighboring town of Bayson, as a site where the seniors can have their prom. Knowing that Moore still has enough influence of pressuring parents to not let their teenagers come, Ren visits him at the church one evening. In conversation, they realize their common ground is the loss of a loved one. After Shaw tells the story of Bobby, Ren describes his mother's death. He states with quiet determination that even though the City Council refused the motion to abolish the law, they cannot stop the dance. He then respectfully requests permission to take Ariel to the prom, and Shaw agrees.

A few days before the prom, Shaw unexpectedly asks his congregation to pray for the high school students putting on the event. The students (and many parents) prepare and decorate the mill for the big night.

On prom night, not long after Ren and Ariel arrive, Chuck and several of his friends show up, intending to start trouble. Chuck's gang is subdued and run off by Ren, Ariel, Willard, Ariel's best friend Rusty Rodriguez, and Andy. They enter the mill where Ren flings confetti into a shredding machine and yells, "Let's dance!" as everyone joins in dancing to a country rendition of "Footloose".

== Cast ==
- Kenny Wormald as Ren McCormack
- Julianne Hough as Ariel Moore
- Dennis Quaid as Reverend Shaw Moore
- Andie MacDowell as Vi Moore
- Miles Teller as Willard
- Ray McKinnon as Wes Warnicker
- Patrick John Flueger as Chuck
- Kim Dickens as Lulu Warnicker
- Ziah Colon as Rusty
- Ser'Darius Blain as Woody
- Maggie Jones as Amy Warnicker
- Mary-Charles Jones as Sarah Warnicker
- Josh Warren as Rich Sawyer
- Jayson Warner Smith as Officer Herb

== Production ==
=== Development ===
In October 2008, Kenny Ortega was announced as director but left the project a year later after differences with Paramount and the production budget. Peter Sollett was also hired to write the script. Dylan Sellers, Neil Meron and Craig Zadan served as producer; Zadan having produced the original Footloose. In 2010, Craig Brewer came on to re-write the script after Crawford and Ortega left the project and also served as director. The writer of the original film, Dean Pitchford, also co-wrote the screenplay. Amy Vincent served as cinematographer.

=== Casting ===
In July 2007, Zac Efron was cast as Ren McCormack, but he left the project in March 2009, due to concerns about being typecasted following his starring role as Troy Bolton in the High School Musical franchise. Two months later, it was reported that Chace Crawford would replace Efron, but he later had to back out due to scheduling conflicts. Thomas Dekker was a "top candidate" for the role but on June 22, 2010, Entertainment Weekly reported that Kenny Wormald had secured the lead role as McCormack.

Former Dancing with the Stars ballroom-dance professional Julianne Hough was cast as Ariel. Amanda Bynes, Miley Cyrus and Hayden Panettiere were considered for the part before Hough was cast. Dennis Quaid was cast as Reverend Shaw Moore, and Miles Teller was cast as Willard Hewitt. On August 24, 2010, Andie MacDowell joined the cast as Quaid's wife. During an interview on The Howard Stern Show, Kevin Bacon said he declined a cameo appearance in the film as he did not like the role he was offered: Ren McCormack's deadbeat father. Though Bacon passed on the role, he gave Brewer his blessing.

=== Filming ===
While the original film has the fictional town of "Bomont" located in Utah, the remake instead places the town in Georgia. On a budget of $24 million, principal photography began in September 2010 in and around metro Atlanta, and wrapped two months later in November. A courtroom scene was shot at the Newton County Historic Courthouse in Covington, Georgia on September 17, 20 and 21. A family scene was filmed at the New Senoia Raceway in Senoia on October 1.

A scene taken from the original film, in which McCormack plays a game of "chicken" with his love interest's boyfriend, was filmed on the Chattahoochee River bridge on Franklin Parkway in downtown Franklin also in October. The home and church scene in the film were filmed in downtown Acworth. Production used the sanctuary of the Acworth Presbyterian Church and the house of the Mayor, Tommy Allegood.

=== Music ===
The original soundtrack was released by Atlantic Records and Warner Music Nashville on September 27, 2011. It includes eight new songs and four remakes of songs from the original film's soundtrack. Brewer said, "I can promise Footloose fans that I will be true to the spirit of the original film. But I still gotta put my own Southern grit into it and kick it into 2011." Kenny Loggins' "Footloose" was covered by Blake Shelton for the remake, which is an upbeat country version. The film opens with several teens dancing to Loggins' original version of the song. Like the original film, the 2011 version also features "Bang Your Head (Metal Health)" by the heavy metal band Quiet Riot and "Let's Hear It for the Boy" by Deniece Williams.

No.	Title	Writer(s)	Artist	Length
1.	"Footloose"	Kenny Loggins; Dean Pitchford	Blake Shelton	3:39
2.	"Where The River Goes"	Zac Brown; Wyatt Durrette; Drew Pearson; Anne Preven	Zac Brown	3:39
3.	"Little Lovin'"	Elisabeth Marius; Angelo Petraglia	Lissie	4:30
4.	"Holding Out for a Hero"	Dean Pitchford; Jim Steinman	Ella Mae Bowen	5:21
5.	"Let's Hear It for the Boy"	Dean Pitchford; Tom Snow	Jana Kramer	4:10
6.	"So Sorry Mama"	Whitney Duncan; Gordie Sampson; John Shanks	Whitney Duncan	3:43
7.	"Fake I.D."	John Rich; John Shanks	Big & Rich featuring Gretchen Wilson	3:21
8.	"Almost Paradise"	Eric Carmen; Dean Pitchford	Victoria Justice and Hunter Hayes	3:37
9.	"Walkin' Blues"	R.L. Burnside	Cee Lo Green featuring Kenny Wayne Shepherd	3:48
10.	"Magic in My Home"	Jason Freeman	Jason Freeman	3:13
11.	"Suicide Eyes"	Michael Hobby; Jaren Johnston; William Satcher	A Thousand Horses	3:00
12.	"Dance the Night Away"	Lavell Crump; Christopher Goodman; Dean Pitchford; Rhashida Stafford; Bill Wolfer	David Banner featuring Denim	4:13
Total length:				44:14

== Release and promotion ==
The film was originally scheduled for release in North America on April 1, 2011, but was moved to October 14, 2011. Footloose was released in Australia and New Zealand on October 6, 2011.

Paramount and HSN partnered for a 24-hour promotion on October 12, 2011. They sold clothing inspired by the film, such as women's red boots, denim, footwear and nail polish brands created by Vince Camuto and Steve Madden. To promote the film, Paramount sent the cast and director on a promotional tour in over a dozen cities.

Footloose was promoted on the October 11, 2011, episode of Dancing with the Stars. The episode featured film stars Kenny Wormald and Julianne Hough—a former champion on the show—dancing to the songs "Holding Out for a Hero" and "Footloose" from the film's soundtrack with Blake Shelton performing the song live. At the CMA Awards, Shelton was joined by original "Footloose" performer Kenny Loggins to sing the song. Many of Viacom owned channels, like MTV, Nickelodeon and CMT advertised and promoted the film.

== Reception ==
=== Box office ===
Pre-release audience pollings predicted the film to take in $20 million its opening weekend. However, Paramount expected it to be closer to $15 million. Footloose opened in 3,549 theaters taking in $15.5 million and placing number two, behind Real Steel ($16.2 million) in its opening weekend. Exit polls indicated that the film appealed to 75 percent of females and 28 percent of the teen market. About 60 percent of the audience was over age 25 and 46 percent over age 35. The 20th highest grossing locations on Friday were in Salt Lake City, Oklahoma City, Knoxville, Kansas City, and San Antonio. The opening was lower than other recent dance films, like Save the Last Dance (2001, $23.4 million), Step Up (2006, $20.7 million), but it performed around the same as Step Up 3D (2010, $15.8 million) and You Got Served (2004, $16.1 million). The 1984 Footloose opened to $20 million when adjusted for ticket price inflation. In its second weekend the film held well, with a drop of 34 percent. It placed third and grossed an estimated $10.4 million.

In Australia, the film opened to $1.05 million and to $88,078 in New Zealand. Footloose has grossed $51.1 million in the United States and Canada, and $10.9 million in other countries, for a worldwide total of $62 million. The 1984 Footloose grossed over $80 million worldwide.

=== Critical response ===
Review aggregator Rotten Tomatoes reports that 68% of 174 surveyed critics have given the film a positive review; the average rating is 6.0/10. The website's consensus is: "While it hews closely to the 1984 original, Craig Brewer infuses his Footloose remake with toe-tapping energy and manages to keep the story fresh for a new generation." Metacritic, which assigns a weighted average score out of 100 to reviews from mainstream critics, gives the film a score of 58 based on 35 reviews. CinemaScore polls reported that the average grade moviegoers gave the film was an "A" on an A+ to F scale.

Lisa Schwarzbaum of Entertainment Weekly gave the film an A−. Praising the performance of Wormald, she said he "handily owns the role for a new audience" and closed her review saying, "Guardians of the '80s flame will approve of the production's sincere respect for the original; church still matters, and so do Ariel's red cowboy boots." Roger Ebert of the Chicago Sun-Times rated the film one and half stars out of four, calling it "a film without wit, humor or purpose". Ebert further criticized the film for being too close to the 1984 original and Wormald's lack of charisma compared to Bacon.

Variety's Rob Nelson wrote that the film failed to distinguished itself from the original and criticized Wormald and Hough's acting performances, saying, "When the music stops, young Hough is saddled, like her co-star, with the impossible task of making 27-year-old verbiage sound fresh." Nelson wrote that Brewer's musical staging is "subtly less theatrical than Ross', but it hardly constitutes a reinvention" and that Brewer's film comes across as "slightly milder" than Ross', such as with Ariel's abuse by former boyfriend being toned down for 2011. Todd McCarthy of The Hollywood Reporter disliked how the dance numbers and action sequences were staged, shot and cut, saying, "The visual clumsiness does not disguise that Wormald (a professional dancer since extreme youth), especially, but the others too, are very good dancers. But the compositions vary randomly between close-ups, awkward medium shots and general coverage that cuts together with no cumulative dynamic power." Orlando Sentinel''s Roger Moore gave the film two and half out of four stars.

Kenneth Turan of the Los Angeles Times wrote that the film "doesn't have the emotional impact of the original, but it ups the energy level." He said that the film was "not so much a remake as a renovation" and said the remake is similar to the original "in all the ways that count". The New York Times's A. O. Scott called the dance numbers "woefully inadequate" when compared with Glee, High School Musical and Step Up. For Wormald's performance he said, "He has energy but no real magnetism, and while he may be in possession of what are technically known as 'moves', his dancing lacks sensuality and a sense of release." Scott gave Miles Teller a good review saying that he "has a natural charisma that is both comic and kind of sexy". He described the music in the remake as "better and more eclectic than the original, with some blues, country and vintage metal mixed in with the peppy dance tunes".

=== Home media ===
Paramount Home Entertainment released Footloose on DVD and Blu-ray on March 6, 2012.
