= Sing! (competition) =

High school musical theater competition in NYC

Sing!, often stylized SING!, is an annual student-run musical production put on by some high schools in New York City. It is a theater competition between the various grades, with the setup between grades differing from school to school (such as sophomore-freshman vs. seniors vs. juniors, senior-sophomore vs. junior-freshman or freshman-senior vs. sophomore-junior).

Sing! was conceived by Bella Tillis (1913–2013), a music teacher at Midwood High School in Brooklyn, New York in 1947.

A Library of Congress archive of the papers of entertainer Danny Kaye, who went to high school with Tillis, contains playbills of Sing! performances at Midwood High School from the years 1953–1957.

The 1989 film Sing is based on a fictional Sing! production. According to The New York Times review of the movie, the film's production notes say that Paul Simon, Neil Diamond, Barbra Streisand, Carole King and Neil Sedaka, who attended various Brooklyn and Queens high schools in the mid to late 1950s, took part in Sing! productions. Other Sing! celebrities include Stuyvesant High School's Tim Robbins and Paul Reiser, and James Madison High School's Janis Siegel.

== Inter-Sing ==
Inter-Sings are Sing competitions held between different high schools. They have been held in Brooklyn, Queens, Staten Island and Long Island. Sheepshead Bay High School had a string of victories in the three-school Brooklyn competition called InterSchool Sing (or Inter-Sing) during the 1970s and 1980s, punctuated by wins by Midwood High School and Abraham Lincoln High School.

Inter-Sing first started on Staten Island in the late 1970s between Tottenville and Susan Wagner high schools. More recently, Susan E. Wagner High School won the Staten Island competition in 2007 with their Junior production of "The JSV Circus"; Staten Island Technical High School won in 2008 with their Senior-Sophomore production entitled "Carnicus"; and Tottenville High School, which participated for the first time, won in 2009 with Senior Sing X's production of "Narneville", a twisted fairy tale. Inter-Sing 2015 in Brooklyn was broadcast on live TV in Brooklyn.

== See also ==
- Forest Hills High School Sing!
- The Leon M. Goldstein High School for the Sciences Sing!
- Midwood High School Sing!
- Stuyvesant High School Sing!
- Susan E. Wagner High School Sing!
