= Susan E. Wagner High School =

Public school in New York City

Location
- 1200 Manor Rd; Staten Island, New York 10314; United States; 40°35′50″N 74°7′31″W

Information
- Type: Public
- Established: 1968; 58 years ago
- School district: New York City Department of Education
- School number: R460
- NCES School ID: 360010302878
- Principal: David A. Cugini
- Teaching staff: 186.48 (on an FTE basis)
- Grades: 9-12
- Enrollment: 2,743 (2024-2025)
- Student to teacher ratio: 14.71
- Campus: City: Large
- Colors: Navy Blue and White
- Mascot: Falcons
- Yearbook: Chrysalis
- Website: www.wagnerhigh.net

Susan E. Wagner High School is a New York City public school in Staten Island, New York. The school is operated by the New York City Department of Education. It opened in September 1968, and was named in honor of Susan E. Wagner (1909–1964), the late wife of former mayor Robert F. Wagner Jr. Wagner's school colors are Navy and White, with the Falcon as the mascot. Wagner has a variety of programs including the Law and Politics program, the Virtual Enterprise program, the Scholars Academy, Air Force JROTC, Theatrical Arts program, and annual SING! productions. The school received the Blue Ribbon School of Excellence in the 1988–1989 school year.

== History ==
Wagner was founded in 1968 and was named in honor of Susan E. Wagner (1909–1964), the late wife of former mayor Robert F. Wagner Jr. Joseph Brennan was the first principal from 1968 to 1970. Gary Giordano was principal of the school from 2002 to 2017. Afterwards, David Cugini, a former social studies teacher at the school, was given the job.

== Academic courses ==
Wagner follows Regents curriculum. They offer Regents courses in Algebra I, Geometry, Algebra II/Trigonometry, Global History & Geography, United States History & Government, Living Environment, Earth Science, Chemistry, Physics, and English Language Arts.

=== Elective courses ===
Wagner offers multiple Elective Courses. These include:

- Holocaust Literature
- African American Literature
- Poetry
- Creative Writing
- Psychology
- Forensic Science
- Anatomy & Physiology
- Astronomy
- Geology
- EMT
- Intro to College Mathematics
- Spanish 7/8 Culture
- Spanish 7/8 Grammar
- Italian 7/8 Culture

=== Advanced Placement courses ===
Wagner offers multiple Advanced Placement courses. These include:

- AP Psychology
- AP English Literature & Composition
- AP US History
- AP Calculus AB
- AP English Language & Composition
- AP Spanish Language & Culture
- AP Environmental Science
- AP Chemistry
- AP Computer Science Principles
- AP Computer Science Java (debuting Fall 2023)
- AP Biology
- AP US Government & Politics
- AP World History

=== College Now courses ===
Wagner offers College Now courses through the City University of New York College Now (Kingsborough and College of Staten Island), Wagner College, and St. John's University. There are courses in all subjects included. Courses include but are not limited too:

- Behavioral & Social Science
- Nutritional Science
- Introduction to Computer Concepts
- Communications

== Learning centers ==
All Wagner students are organized in a learning center based on an academic subject, with its own Teacher/Coordinator, guidance counselor, Assistant Principal, and specific activities. Some learning centers are open to both zoned and non-zoned students. Wagner is currently going over an overhaul of its Learning Centers as well, with some debuting in the 2023–2024 school year.

- Academy of Carpentry
- Academy of Finance
- Academy of Language & Culture
- Academy of Science
- Academy of Air Force Junior ROTC
- Academy of Dance
- Institute for Law & Politics
- Institute for Theatrical Arts
- Academy of Leadership
- Academy of Media & Digital Technology
- Academy of Music
- Scholars Academy
- Academy of Sports Management
- Academy of Virtual Enterprise
- Academy of Visual Arts
- Vocational Preparatory Academy
- Institute of Medicine (debuting Fall 2022)
- Academy of Digital Communications (debuting Fall 2022)
- Academy of STEM (debuting Fall 2022)
- Future Teacher's Academy (debuting Fall 2022)
- Career Skills Academy (debuting Fall 2022)

=== Scholars Academy ===
All "scholar" classes are weighted by 1.05, meaning that the average of the class is multiplied by 1.05. The weighted average of the class is the grade that is used in the configuration of the final average. To become a scholar, you must have above a 88 overall average. To remain in the program you must maintain above an 85 average in at least three scholars classes. An overall average below 88 will result in scholars probation and eventually removal from the program. All students must be inducted in the school's branch of National Honor Society, receive an Advanced Regents Diploma, and will take most, if not all, regents examinations New York State offers.

The Scholars Academy requires students to take each math course from Algebra I to Pre-Calculus as well as Living Environment, Chemistry, & Physics, and three years of a foreign language (Spanish, Italian, or French). Students in the academy are required to take numerous AP Courses, starting with AP World History in sophomore year. Students in the academy receive the option of three tracks; a STEM Track (Students take AP Biology and then AP Computer Science for two years), a Humanities Track (Students take Latin and Student Teaching) and an Arts track.

== Performing and visual arts programs ==
The performing and visual arts department was awarded $13 million for a 27,000 square-foot performing arts center, which opened in October 2016. The center includes a 2,680 square foot black box theater, professional dance studio, many new classrooms for chorus, guitar, band, theater, stage craft and carpentry, and a music suite containing five sound-proof practice rooms. The program is directed by Assistant Principal of Arts Paul Corn, who has served in that role for over ten years.

=== Music ===
The school has numerous bands: Wind Ensemble, Symphonic Band, Concert Band, Jazz Band, and a Marching Band. The school also has a wide range of Required Music courses, such as Beginning Instruments, and Guitar courses. The advanced bands perform throughout the city, as well as annual trips to compete in locations such as Florida, Washington, D.C., and Boston. In addition to instrumental music, Wagner has an Intermediate, Advanced, & Concert Chorus, along with a Chamber Choir.

=== Visual arts ===
Students in the Visual Arts Academy are placed in two tracks based on what they auditioned for, Drawing or Photography & Graphic Design. Students who choose to take art beginning as a freshman will take either Required Art, Ninth Grade Major Art, or Intro to Photography. Students will have classes on all major types of visual arts throughout their time in the academy. In Photography, students explore types of photography, graphic design, and including creativity in taking pictures.

=== Theatrical arts ===
Students in the Theatre Academy take four years of advanced theatre courses. Students will start with Acting, then Musical Theatre, then Advanced Acting, then Playwriting, and finally Directing. Created by Diana Zerega, the longtime Coordinator of the program, Wagner's theatre program is often considered second only to Laguardia High School's, the city's largest performing arts high school.

In 2011, the school was awarded a $200,000 from Borough President James Molinaro to retrofit their auditorium after their production of Les Misérables. The retrofit was complete in time for their Spring Musical of Sweeney Todd: The Demon Barber of Fleet Street in 2012. The theatre program has also been invited to the historic St. George Theater to perform Les Misérables and Sweeney Todd.

== Student activities ==
Wagner has a large pool of Activities for students overseen by the Coordinator of Student Activities (COSA) and the Student Government. The school's include but are not limited to the Gay-Straight Alliance, Debate Team, Key Club, Service to Society Club, Science Research Club, and more.

=== SING productions ===
Founded at Midwood High School (Brooklyn, New York) in 1947, "SING" is a student-run theater production that includes script/acting, dancing, art, a chorus, and a band. Students are judged on areas including originality, singing, art, acting, band, script, and dancing. There are three groups: Sophmen (freshmen and sophomores conjoined), Juniors, and Seniors. Susan E. Wagner's SING program began in 1974, and averages nearly 200 to 250 participants yearly. Each student will end up spending about 300 hours on the show, however the students often have a strong pride from it.

=== International Festival production ===
The International Festival is a student-run production that showcases an assortment of food and a three-hour show presenting the diversity of the school through a collection of dances, fashion, songs, plays, and exhibitions from all around the world. This production includes over 20 cultural-based club with the goal of performing.

=== Athletics ===
Wagner has over 30 Junior Varsity and Varsity teams, including in Badminton, Basketball, Bowling, Cross Country, Flag Football, Golf, Gymnastics, Handball, Indoor Track, Lacrosse, Outdoor Track, Soccer, Softball, Stunt, Swimming, Table Tennis, Tennis, Volleyball, and more. In 2021, the school's Boys Bowling Team won the PSAL Bowling Championship for the third year in a row.

== Notable alumni ==
- Marcia Clark – Prosecutor in the O.J. Simpson murder trial
- Drita D'Avanzo – Star of VH1's Mob Wives
- Vinny Guadagnino – Star of MTV’s Jersey Shore, Hammerhead on The Masked Dancer
- Angelina Pivarnick – Star of MTV's Jersey Shore
- Frank Menechino – Former MLB player and current Minor League Hitting Coach
- Alex Zablocki – Politician who ran for New York City Public Advocate in 2009
- Lou Anarumo – Football Coach and 2022 Super Bowl Defensive Coordinator for the Bengals
- Jeff Wittek – YouTuber and Internet personality.
- Louis Rossmann – YouTuber, Internet personality, and right to repair activist.
