= Queen of the Broken Hearts =

Single by Loverboy

from the album Keep It Up
- B-side: "Chance of a Lifetime"
- Released: 1983
- Length: 3:48
- Label: Columbia
- Songwriter(s): Paul Dean, Mike Reno
- Producer(s): Bruce Fairbairn

Loverboy singles chronology
"Hot Girls in Love" (1983)	"Queen of the Broken Hearts" (1983)	"Lovin' Every Minute of It" (1985)

"Queen of the Broken Hearts" is a song featured on the 1983 album Keep It Up by the Canadian rock band Loverboy. The song was released as a single later that year, reaching #34 on the Billboard Hot 100 and #11 on the Mainstream Rock Chart. Despite being a relatively successful hit for the band, the song has not been included on the two main compilation albums released by the band; Big Ones (1989) and Loverboy Classics (1994).

The video for "Queen of the Broken Hearts" was the subject of an MTV contest in the summer of 1983, in which an MTV viewer won the chance to "star" in Loverboy's next video. The contest was won by a woman named Bridget Magnesi, who appeared very briefly in two shots, behind a bank of computer monitors about 15 seconds into the video.

The video was shot at Bronson Canyon in Los Angeles, where the desert, rock formations, and caves were utilized extensively for a number of popular science fiction television series and many B-movies dating from the early 1950s.

== Charts ==
Chart (1983)	Peak position
US Billboard Hot 100	34
US Mainstream Rock (Billboard)	11
