= Jeff Wittek =

American YouTuber and podcaster (born 1989)

- Born: Jeffrey Rudolph Wittek; December 15, 1989 (age 36); New York City, U.S.
- Education: Susan E. Wagner High School
- Occupations: YouTuber; podcaster

YouTube information
- Channel: Jeff Wittek
- Years active: 2010–present
- Genre: Influencer
- Subscribers: 2.95 million
- Views: 350 million
- Last updated: 23 Apr 2026

Jeffrey Rudolph Wittek (born December 15, 1989) is an American YouTuber, professional barber, and podcaster. Wittek owns Jeff's Barbershop, an online haircare store, and hosts a YouTube series of the same name. He is the host of the podcast, Jeff FM.

== Early life ==
Wittek was born and grew up in Staten Island, New York, where he attended Susan E. Wagner High School. As a teenager Wittek worked in a local barbershop, out of which he also sold drugs at the same time, and was arrested multiple times for selling marijuana. He continued selling drugs after relocating to Miami, Florida, and was eventually arrested in 2011 at age 21 for possession of marijuana, cocaine, and a controlled substance, as well as illegal drug trafficking. The charges were dismissed for lack of an apparent search warrant, after which he moved to Los Angeles.

== Career ==
=== 2010: Bad Girls Club Season 5 ===
Jeff made an appearance on Bad Girls Club in multiple episodes of Season 5. He was introduced as the crush of one of the contestants, Erica.

=== 2012–16: Early YouTube and 1600 Vine ===
Wittek started his YouTube account in 2011, but first became known for the Tumblr account he started in 2012, Behind the Cuts, where he styled the hair of celebrities like Mac Miller and Pauly D. He also posted hair styling and party pictures on Instagram.

Wittek's fame increased after his 2014 move to 1600 Vine, a Hollywood apartment building known for housing internet celebrities like Jake Paul and Lele Pons. There he met the Vlog Squad. For three years starting in 2015, he dated actress Cierra Ramirez.

=== 2017–19: The Vlog Squad and Jeff's Barbershop ===
He started filming episodes for his online talk show Jeff's Barbershop in 2019, and gained enough popularity to become a brand ambassador for Old Spice.

=== 2020–present: Accident, Don't Try This at Home, Patreon, and Lawsuit ===
In June 2020, Jeff Wittek was injured in Utah while filming a stunt with David Dobrik and the Vlog Squad. Dobrik was operating an excavator in a shallow lake while Wittek swung from a rope attached to the end of the excavator's arm. Dobrik spun the rope too fast and then abruptly stopped, causing Wittek to hit the excavator and fall into the water upside down with his foot stuck in the rope. Wittek's injuries included a fractured skull, a fractured left eye socket, a broken hip and foot, and torn ligaments in his leg. Despite these injuries, Wittek continued filming his series, Jeff's Barbershop, without addressing them publicly.

In April 2021, Wittek released a docuseries titled Don't Try This at Home, comprising five episodes in which he explained the circumstances surrounding the injury and described his recovery. He also discussed the impact on his relationship with Dobrik. After releasing the first episode, Wittek pivoted to Patreon because the footage of his injuries was deemed too graphic for YouTube. His Patreon account gained 37,000 followers in the first 10 days, making him one of the most-followed creators on that platform and the highest-paid creator of 18+ content on the platform at the time.

In March 2022, it was revealed in leaked footage from an upcoming documentary by fellow YouTuber Casey Neistat and in an episode of Dobrik's Views podcast that David Dobrik was evidently blaming Jeff Wittek for the accident. Dobrik allegedly stated that the accident involving the excavator was the idea of Wittek and that he should be taking more responsibility, which Wittek quickly denied in a response video on the JEFF FM YouTube channel. Within his response, Wittek asserted he refused to appear on an episode of Dobrik's Views podcast, claiming that Dobrik would attempt to manipulate his words and editing into blaming Wittek for his physical and emotional trauma, along with a sense of discomfort around the individual that caused such suffering.

In June 2022, it was revealed that Dobrik was being sued by Jeff Wittek in relation to the 2020 accident. The lawsuit does not detail specifics for the myriad of injuries Wittek experienced, although in his 2021 docuseries, it was heavily mentioned that he faced the possibility of losing his eye, which is included in the suit. This is after claiming in February 2022 that he "almost died" the day of the accident. Dobrik responded by asserting that Wittek knew the risks of the stunt and requested the judge dismiss the complaint. Jeff Wittek dropped his lawsuit in May 2026 stating that Dobrik had paid his medical bills.

== Personal life ==
In 2024, Wittek starred in the third season of the H3 Podcast series The Bach3lor, in search of finding someone to settle down with. Spanning five episodes, Wittek ultimately chose Australian contestant, Verica (pronounced [ʋêrit͡sa]) from Brisbane, Queensland, from twenty bachlorettes.

== Awards and nominations ==
=== Streamy Awards ===
The YouTube Streamy Awards are an award show presented by Tubefilter which recognizes and honors excellence in online video, including directing, acting, producing, and writing. The formal ceremony at which the awards are presented takes place in Los Angeles, California.

Year	Category	Nominated work	Result	Ref(s)
2020	Unscripted Series	Jeff's Barbershop	Nominated	
2021	Documentary	"Don't Try This At Home"	Won	
