= Lehi Roller Mills =

Flour mill in Lehi, Utah, United States

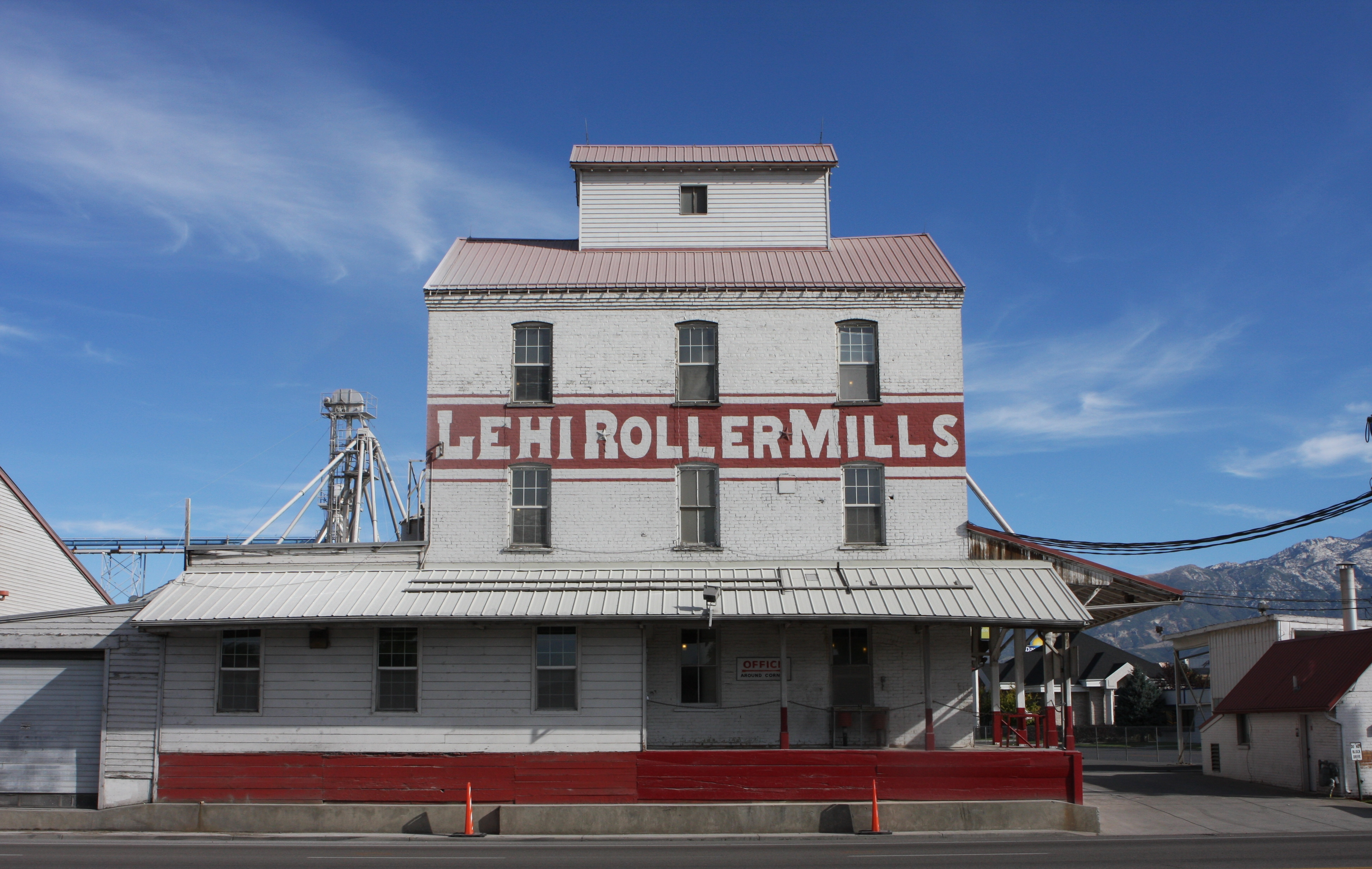
View of the Lehi Roller Mills from the South

Lehi Roller Mills is a locally run and operated flour mill and historical landmark of Lehi, Utah. The original brick building was built in 1905 and has expanded since then. It has become a feature of the Utah Valley as a filming location for the movie Footloose (1984). The Roller Mills was added to the National Register of Historic Places in 1994. The building still stands today and is home to a renovated business model now named ‘Lehi Mills’.

== History of the Roller Mills ==
=== Founding the Roller Mills ===
After the official settling of Lehi in 1850, it took years for farmers to adapt to the arid landscape and little rain that Utah Valley provided. They worked hard to cultivate the land through irrigation, and wheat farmers eventually needed somewhere to grind their wheat into flour. The first gristmill in Lehi was founded by Samuel Mulliner in 1858. Previously, farmers had to travel to the mouth of American Fork Canyon or to Salt Lake County in order to grind their crops into flour. After Mulliner’s Mill was sold to the Lehi Mill and Stock Company in 1890 and then to the Utah Sugar Company in 1891, a necessity for a new mill developed. The Lehi Commercial Club organized a campaign to build a new mill and it was funded by the Lehi Mill and Elevator Company. In 1905, they were successful in acquiring the support necessary to do so. They chose a site on East Main Street because of its proximity to the Union Pacific Railroad. The first sack of flour was created in April 1906, and production soon reached sixty to seventy bushels a day. Within the year, the mill's popularity required an expansion so that production could increase even more. Originally, the mill had to rely on grain from local farmers and even had to advertise that they would pay for wheat and barley.

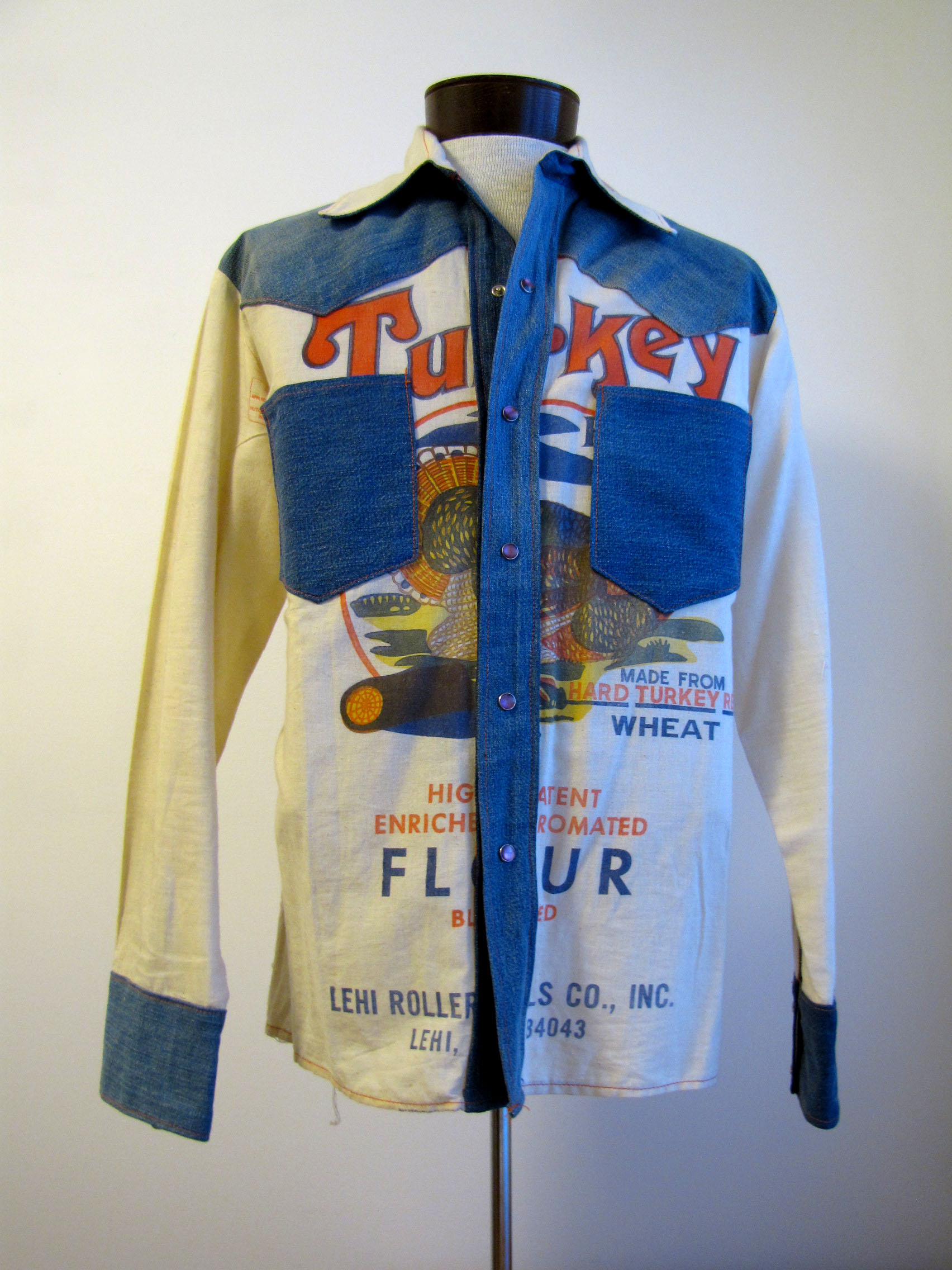
A shirt made from a Turkey Brand flour bag from the Lehi Roller Mills.

=== Early Development of the Roller Mills ===
In 1910, ownership shifted from the co-op that had founded the mill to a man named George G. Robinson. He modernized the equipment and by the beginning of World War I had created a reputation for the superior quality of the flour from Lehi Roller Mills. Upon his death in 1936, Robinson’s sons, Sherman and Raymond Robinson continued to run the mill. During World War II, the mill was able to contribute to the war effort by selling flour to the government. Throughout the years, continual modernization has increased the capacity of production for the Roller Mills.

Painted on the side of the mills are depictions of the Turkey Red and Peacock Brand logos that were historically included on the cotton flour bags. These logos became familiar to customers, as they represented the high-quality flour that they would receive from the mill. The bags themselves were used in a variety of capacities, from aprons to tablecloths to pillowcases and even underwear.

=== The Flour ===
Lehi Roller Mills get all of their wheat from local farmers within a 100-mile radius of the mill. Their two main types of flour are their enriched white flour, under the name Turkey Flour, and their all-purpose flour, under the name Peacock Flour. Their other options include Bread Flour, Baking Flour, and Whole Wheat Flour. They use their flours in their pancake, waffle, muffin, and dessert mixes.

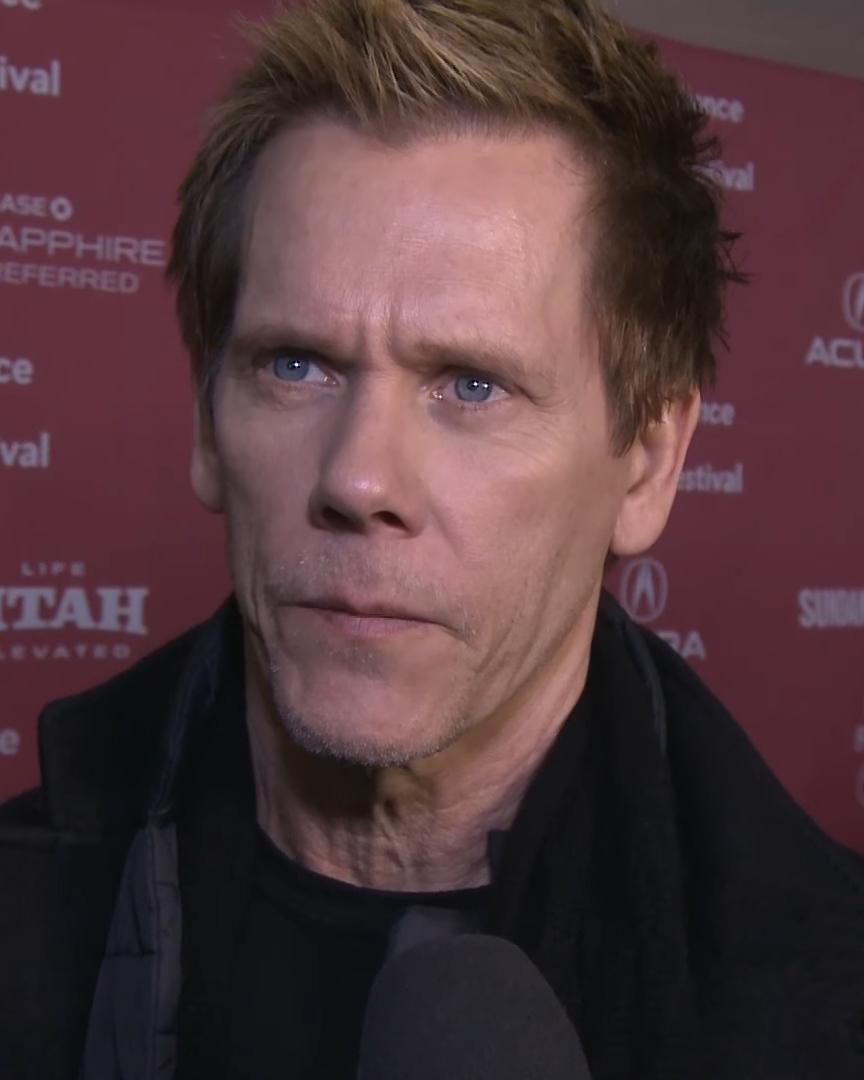
Actor Kevin Bacon, who starred in the movie Footloose (1984), which was filmed at the Lehi Roller Mills.

=== Footloose Movie ===
The Lehi Roller Mills became the location for the prom scenes in the movie Footloose (1984) directed by Herbert Ross and starring Kevin Bacon, Lori Singer, John Lithgow and Sarah Jessica Parker. The movie is about a small town that has banned dancing and rock music. The Roller Mills is an important location in the film. It is where Kevin Bacon's character works. Kevin Bacon even worked at the mills himself to get a feel of how it would actually be for his character. In a pivotal scene, a group of teenagers rebel and hold a dance that takes place at the Roller Mills.

Sherman Robinson, owner of the Roller Mills at the time, was approached by executive producer Daniel Melnick who passed the location while on a trip to Park City. Melnick thought the location stood out and would be fitting for the climactic scene of the dance held by the rebellious teenagers. Robinson agreed to make the Mills a filming location. The filming of the movie brought a lot of excitement to the small town, which had a population of about 12,000 at the time. Some supporting roles were actually filled by local community members. Nearby institutions such as Brigham Young University, the University of Utah, and the Sundance Theatre were called upon to provide extra dancers for the film's dance numbers. The local talent helped the filmmakers create the small-town feel that they were striving for. The film contributed to a lot of excitement around the Roller Mills. Even today the fame the Roller Mills received from Footloose helps the company with sales.

== Modern Roller Mills ==
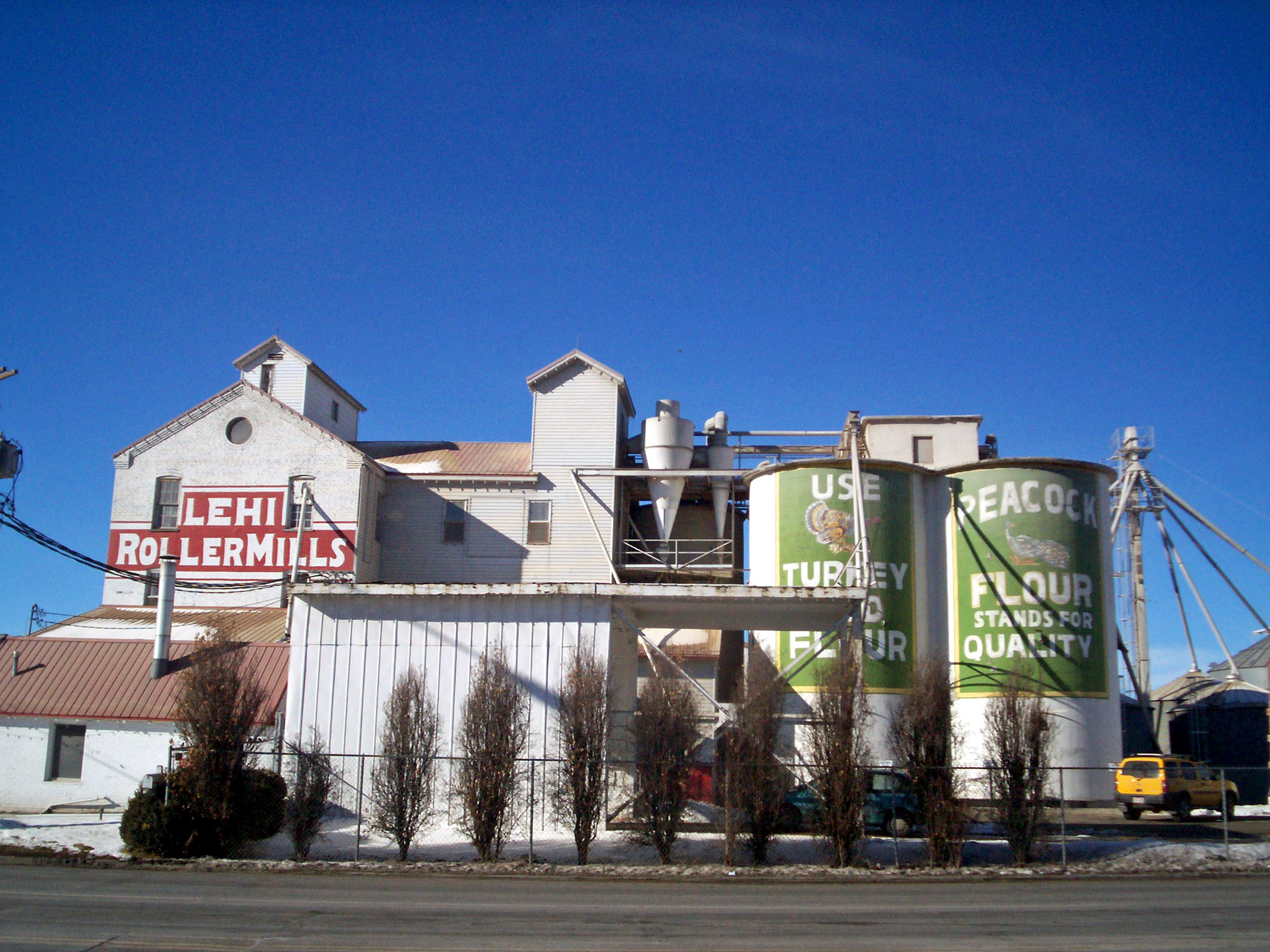
Front View of the Lehi Roller Mills: Including Turkey and Peacock Flour Symbols

=== Kentucky Fried Chicken ===
One of the more notable customers of the Mills is Kentucky Fried Chicken. In 1952, the Roller Mills provided their flour to the first Kentucky Fried Chicken restaurant, which was located in Salt Lake City, Utah. This deal helped keep the Mills running, and is still helping them today. The Roller Mills provides the flour for coating chicken and cornbread mix for the franchise in the Western United States.

=== National Historic Place ===
The Roller Mills became registered as a National Historic Place in 1995. The building has kept a lot of the same structures since its opening and has added on new developments since then showing the progress of milling since 1910. It includes the original grain elevators with the logos for the Mill’s Turkey Red and Peacock Flour and the original 3 story brick building. Even inside it has kept some of the original machines and signage. While some of its processes have changed they still use electric milling and uses the same technology to mill flour. The Roller Mills is also a Historic Place because it is one of the only buildings of its type still standing in Utah.

=== The Roller Mills Today ===
As the population of Lehi has increased exponentially in the past few decades, the city has seen a stark increase in suburban and technological development. This has resulted in a decrease of land used for agricultural purposes. The growth has made it so that farmers are less inclined to live and work in the area. This issue, along with legal issues regarding not being paid by a large vendor, led to the Roller Mills facing substantial financial challenges and struggling with bankruptcy around 2013.

The Roller Mills was going through a period of bankruptcy due to not being paid by a large vendor and the lawsuits associated with it. That is when Ken Brailsford bought the Mills from the original founder’s son in 2013. Before the change in ownership, the Mills was already selling prepackaged baking mixes, but since then the company has been growing its retail customers. These prepackaged cloth bag mixes are now available year-round in the Mill’s new retail store and on their website, as well as expansion in sales across the country. One of those new changes is a new warehouse that was built in the neighboring town, American Fork, to help store their product from their growing demand. It is still run by the grandson of the original owner, Sherm Robinson.
