= I'm Free (Heaven Helps the Man) =

Single by Kenny Loggins

from the album Footloose: Original Soundtrack of the Paramount Motion Picture
- B-side: "Welcome to Heartlight"
- Released: June 1984 (42 years ago)
- Recorded: October-December 1983
- Genre: Pop rock
- Length: 3:47
- Label: Columbia
- Songwriters: Kenny Loggins; Dean Pitchford
- Producers: David Foster; Kenny Loggins

Kenny Loggins singles chronology
"Footloose" (1984)	"I'm Free (Heaven Helps the Man)" (1984)	"Vox Humana" (1985)

Music video
- "I'm Free (Heaven Helps the Man)" on YouTube

"I'm Free (Heaven Helps the Man)" is a song recorded by American recording artist Kenny Loggins, composed by Loggins and Dean Pitchford, and produced by Loggins and David Foster. It was released in June 1984 as the second of two singles by Loggins from the film Footloose that are included on the film's soundtrack. It charted at number 22 on the Billboard Hot 100 and number 31 on the Canadian Hot 100.

The song was very well received, and is one of the most recognizable songs recorded by Loggins.

== Music video ==
The video, directed by Brian Grant, starts with Kenny Loggins's character breaking out of a prison. Once free, the music begins. The scene then shifts to him in a car, hiding from police and looking at a picture of a woman. The scene shifts again to Loggins in an alley, surrounded by a gang and asking them about the woman (played by Virginia Madsen); a helpful Samaritan shows Loggins where the woman is located. Loggins then appears in her bedroom and they escape together. At the same time, the police find out about his breakout; Loggins and his girlfriend walk around the town together, but are spotted outside a cinema. The scene shifts again to them running through a building and onto the roof, surrounded by police. Suddenly the gang from earlier arrives and brawls with the police, while the Samaritan helps the pair escape, before walking into the crowd and disappearing.

== In popular culture ==
- "I'm Free" was featured in the Family Guy episode "Stewie Loves Lois" (the season 5 premiere), and during the end credits of the 1984 film Footloose with Kevin Bacon.
- The song is also featured in the video game Grand Theft Auto V, on the in-game radio station Los Santos Rock Radio, which Loggins hosts as a DJ.

== Personnel ==
- Kenny Loggins – vocals, producer
- Steve Wood – acoustic piano
- Nathan East – bass
- Tris Imboden – drums
- Buzz Feiten – guitar
- Steve Lukather – guitar solo
- David Foster – synthesizer, producer
- "The Screamers": Lori Raffa, Laurie Williams, Matt Hayutin, Marc Rubinroit, Megan Howard, Michelle Rodino, Amy Rubinroit, Dylan Leiner, Melissa Larson – background vocals
- Humberto Gatica – recording, mixing

== Chart performance ==
Chart performance for "I'm Free (Heaven Helps the Man)"
Chart (1984–1985)	Peak position
Canada RPM Top Singles	31
US Billboard Hot 100	22
US Billboard Top Rock Tracks	42
US Cash Box Top 100	17
