= Hot Girls in Love =

Single by Loverboy

from the album Keep It Up
- B-side: "Meltdown"
- Released: 1983
- Genre: Hard rock
- Length: 3:58
- Label: Columbia
- Songwriters: Paul Dean, Bruce Fairbairn
- Producer: Bruce Fairbairn

Loverboy singles chronology
"Strike Zone" (1983)	"Hot Girls in Love" (1983)	"Queen of the Broken Hearts" (1983)

"Hot Girls in Love" is a song recorded by the Canadian rock band Loverboy. It was released in 1983 as the second single from the band's third album Keep It Up. The song was a hit, peaking at No. 11 on the Billboard Hot 100 chart and at No. 2 on the Mainstream Rock chart in June 1983.

Cash Box reviewed the single stating that this "hard guitar driven rocker suitably keeps the temp 'a hundred above.'"

== Covers ==
"Hot Girls in Love" was covered by the European glam rock band the Cherry Bombz, and was the title track to their 1985 mini-LP.

In the 1980s, the instrumental from Loverboy's version was used as the theme song to the National Wrestling Alliance television program Championship Wrestling from Georgia on WTBS.

== Charts ==
Chart (1983)	Peak position
US Billboard Hot 100	11
US Album Rock Tracks (Billboard)	2

Year-end chart (1983)	Rank
US Top Pop Singles (Billboard)	75
