= Footloose industry =

Footloose industry refers to an industry that can be located at any place without effect from factors of production such as resources, land, labour, and capital. These industries do not have strong preferences for location as the necessary resources can be found in multiple locations, making them prone to relocation.

These industries typically incur fixed costs that are unaffected by the location of product assembly. Quaternary industries, such as software development, are also usually footloose as they are not bound by a supply of raw materials and can be operated anywhere with the technologies required.

Footloose industries are generally ones that do not produce products that experience large weight change during production and transportation. The production of honey serves as an example of this as the weight of the raw honey and wax is the same as the finishing product. Therefore, whether the honey is processed near the source of the raw materials or at the location of the final product demand, the transportation costs are the same.
