= Footloose (1984 soundtrack) =

1984 soundtrack album

Footloose: Original Soundtrack of the Paramount Motion Picture

Soundtrack album by various artists
- Released: January 27, 1984
- Recorded: 1983–1984
- Genres: AOR; pop rock; synth-pop
- Length: 36:25
- Label: Columbia
- Producers: Kenny Loggins; Lee DeCarlo; George Duke; Keith Olsen; Jim Steinman; Bill Wolfer; David Foster; John Boylan; Sammy Hagar

Singles from Footloose: Original Soundtrack of the Paramount Motion Picture
- 1. "Footloose" Released: January 1984; 2. "Holding Out for a Hero" Released: January 1984; 3. "Dancing in the Sheets" Released: February 1984; 4. "Let's Hear It for the Boy" Released: February 1984; 5. "Almost Paradise" Released: March 1984; 6. "I'm Free (Heaven Helps the Man)" Released: June 1984; 7. "Somebody's Eyes" Released: July 1984

Footloose: Original Soundtrack of the Paramount Motion Picture is the soundtrack album to the Paramount motion picture Footloose. The original nine-track album was released in 1984 and reached number one on the US Billboard 200 chart on April 21, 1984, where it stayed until June 23, 1984. It contained six Billboard Hot 100 Top 40 hits, three of which reached the Top 10, including two number-one hits, "Footloose" by Kenny Loggins and "Let's Hear It for the Boy" by Deniece Williams. "Almost Paradise", a duet by Ann Wilson and Mike Reno reached number seven, plus "Somebody's Eyes" by Karla Bonoff climbed to number 16 on the Adult Contemporary chart.

When it was re-released in 1998, four bonus tracks were added to the album, all of which were used in the film. In 2002, Sony International released the "Australian Souvenir Edition", also titled "Australian Cast Special Edition". Two megamixes were added to the album, featuring the Australian cast of the Footloose musical.

In 2009, Doveman released a reimagining of the soundtrack album. The original soundtrack for the 2011 remake was released by Atlantic Records and Warner Music Nashville on September 27, 2011.

== Track listing ==
No.	Title	Writer(s)	Producer(s)	Length
1.	"Footloose" (Kenny Loggins)	Kenny Loggins; Dean Pitchford	Loggins; Lee DeCarlo (co.)	3:46
2.	"Let's Hear It for the Boy" (Deniece Williams)	Tom Snow; Pitchford	George Duke	4:20
3.	"Almost Paradise... Love Theme from Footloose" (Mike Reno and Ann Wilson)	Eric Carmen; Pitchford	Keith Olsen	3:50
4.	"Holding Out for a Hero" (Bonnie Tyler)	Jim Steinman; Pitchford	Steinman	5:50
5.	"Dancing in the Sheets" (Shalamar)	Bill Wolfer; Pitchford	Wolfer	4:03
6.	"I'm Free (Heaven Helps the Man)" (Kenny Loggins)	Loggins; Pitchford	David Foster; Loggins	3:46
7.	"Somebody's Eyes" (Karla Bonoff)	Snow; Pitchford	John Boylan	3:33
8.	"The Girl Gets Around" (Sammy Hagar)	Sammy Hagar; Pitchford	Hagar	3:22
9.	"Never" (Moving Pictures)	Michael Gore; Pitchford	Boylan	3:45

1998 15th Anniversary Collectors' Edition
No.	Title	Writer(s)	Producer(s)	Length
10.	"Bang Your Head (Metal Health)" (Quiet Riot)	Carlos Cavazo; Kevin DuBrow; Frankie Banali; Tony Cavazo	Spencer Proffer	5:17
11.	"Hurts So Good" (John Mellencamp)	John Mellencamp; George M. Green	Mellencamp; Don Gehman	3:42
12.	"Waiting for a Girl Like You" (Foreigner)	Mick Jones; Lou Gramm	Robert John "Mutt" Lange; Jones	4:50
13.	"Dancing in the Sheets" (Extended 12" Remix) (Shalamar)	Pitchford; Wolfer	Wolfer; John "Jellybean" Benitez^{[a]}	6:16

- ^a signifies a remixer

== Personnel ==
Musicians

- Ken Aronoff – drums (11)
- Frankie Banali – drums (10)
- Michael Boddicker – synthesizer bass and percussion (1)
- Karla Bonoff – lead and background vocals (7)
- Michael Botts – percussion (7)
- Michael Brecker – tenor saxophone (4)
- Hiram Bullock – guitar (4)
- Carlos Cavazo – guitar (10)
- Bill Church – bass guitar and background vocals (8)
- Charlie Cole – keyboards (9)
- Paulinho da Costa – percussion (1, 2, 9)
- Larry Crane – guitar (11)
- Bill Cuomo – keyboard and synthesizers (3)
- Rory Dodd – background vocals and vocal arrangement (4)
- Tom Dolby – main synthesizer (12)
- Marilyn Dorman – background vocals (1)
- Kevin DuBrow – lead vocals (10)
- George Duke – Prophet V, Mini-Moog, Linn drums and Memory Moog (2)
- Nathan East – bass guitar (1, 6, 7)
- Dennis Elliott – drums (12)
- Buzz Feiten – guitar (1, 6)
- Ellen Foley – additional vocal arrangement (4)
- David Foster – synthesizer (6)
- Micki Free – guitar solo (5, 13)
- Garry Frost – guitar (9)
- Steven George – background vocals (9)
- Lou Gramm – lead vocals and percussion (12)
- Carmen Grillo – background vocals (9)
- Sammy Hagar – lead vocals, background vocals, and guitar (8)
- Jesse Harms – keyboards and background vocals (8)
- Howard Hewett – lead and background vocals (5, 13)
- Tris Imboden – drums (1, 6)
- Paul Jackson – guitar (2)
- Mick Jones – guitar, Fender Rhodes, and background vocals (12)
- Tom Kelly – background vocals (9)
- Jim Keltner – drums (3)
- Michael Landau – guitar (7)
- Robert John "Mutt" Lange – background vocals (12)
- Neil Larsen – keyboards (1)
- David Lauser – drums (8)
- Ian Lees – bass guitar (9)
- Marcy Levy – background vocals (9)
- Ian Lloyd – background vocals (12)
- Kenny Loggins – vocals (1, 6)

- Steve Lukather – guitar solo (6)
- Tom Malone – trombone and horn arrangements (4)
- Bob Mayo – keyboard textures (12)
- John Mellencamp – vocals (11)
- George Merrill – background vocals (2)
- Mark Meyer – drums (9)
- Keith Olsen – bass and acoustic guitars (3)
- Richard Page – background vocals (9)
- Alan Pasqua – synthesizer (7, 9)
- George "Chocolate" Perry – bass guitar (11)
- Jerry Peterson – saxophone (3)
- Gary Pihl – guitar and background vocals (8)
- Jim Pugh – trombone (4)
- Mike Reno – vocals (3)
- Mark Rivera – background vocals (12)
- Shannon Rubicam – background vocals (2)
- Alan Rubin – trumpet (4)
- Chas Sandford – electric guitars (3)
- "The Screamers": Lori Raffa, Laurie Williams, Matt Hayutin, Marc Rubinroit, Megan Howard, Michelle Rodino, Amy Rubinroit, Dylan Leiner, Melissa Larson – background vocals (6)
- Phil Shenale – programming and synthesizer (4)
- Holly Sherwood – background vocals and vocal arrangement (4)
- Alex Smith – lead vocals (9)
- Sterling Smith – piano, synthesizer and Linn drums (4)
- Lew Soloff – trumpet (4)
- Tom Snow – Fender Rhodes (7)
- Dave Taylor – bass trombone (4)
- Eric Thayer – background vocals and vocal arrangement (4)
- Andrew Thompson – saxophone (9)
- Bonnie Tyler – vocals (4)
- Wendy Waldman – background vocals
- Mike Wanchic – guitar (11)
- Rickey Washington – background vocals (1)
- David Williams – guitar (5, 13)
- Deniece Williams – vocals (2)
- Rick Wills – bass guitar and background vocals (12)
- Ann Wilson – vocals (3)
- Bill Wolfer – Simmons and LM-1 drums, Yamaha CS-80 Emulator, Oberheim OB-Xa and DSX, Moog Minimoog, and Memorymoog (5, 13)
- Art Wood – Simmons and Linn drums (4)
- Steve Wood – keyboards and background vocals (1), acoustic piano (6)
- Chuck Wright – bass guitar (10)

Technical personnel

- Chris Athens – digital remastering
- John Boylan – mastering assembly
- Greg Calbi – mastering (4)
- Michael Dilbeck – album coordinator
- Neil Dorfsman – associate producer (4)
- Nancy Fogarty – music editing
- Brian Foraker – mixing (3)
- Humberto Gatica – mixing (1, 6)
- Paul Grupp – mixing (7, 9)
- Jim Henrikson – music editing
- John Jansen – associate producer (4)
- Keith Olsen – mixing (3)
- Tom Perry – mixing (2)
- Dean Pitchford – executive producer
- Arthur Pyson – associate producer (4)
- Al Quaglieri – reissue producer
- Dennis Sager – mixing (3)
- Ed Sanders – mixing (5)
- Becky Shargo – executive producer
- Don Smith – mixing (8)
- Wally Traugott – mastering
- Tommy Vicari – mixing (2)
- Stewart Whitmore – mastering assembly
- Craig Zadan – soundtrack associate producer
- Erik Zobler – mixing (2)

== Charts ==
=== Weekly charts ===
Weekly chart performance for Footloose
Chart (1984–1985)	Peak position
Australian Albums (Kent Music Report)	2
Austrian Albums (Ö3 Austria)	1
Canada Top Albums/CDs (RPM)	1
Dutch Albums (Album Top 100)	42
European Albums (Music & Media)	2
Finnish Albums (Suomen virallinen lista)	3
German Albums (Offizielle Top 100)	3
Icelandic Albums (Tónlist)	1
Italian Albums (Musica e dischi)	4
Japanese LPs (Oricon)	1
New Zealand Albums (RMNZ)	1
Norwegian Albums (VG-lista)	2
Swedish Albums (Sverigetopplistan)	10
Swiss Albums (Schweizer Hitparade)	1
UK Albums (Official Charts)	7
US Billboard 200	1

=== Year-end charts ===
Year-end chart performance for Footloose
Chart (1984)	Position
Australian Albums (Kent Music Report)	14
Austrian Albums (Ö3 Austria)	14
Canada Top Albums/CDs (RPM)	10
German Albums (Offizielle Top 100)	14
New Zealand Albums (RMNZ)	13
Swiss Albums (Schweizer Hitparade)	9
UK Albums (Gallup)	48
US Billboard 200	9
US Soundtrack Albums (Billboard)	1

== Certifications ==
Certifications for Footloose
Region	Certification	Certified units/sales
Australia (ARIA)	5× Platinum	350,000^{‡}
Austria (IFPI Austria)	Gold	25,000^{*}
Canada (Music Canada)	6× Platinum	600,000^{^}
France (SNEP)	Platinum	300,000^{*}
Germany (BVMI)	Gold	250,000^{^}
Hong Kong (IFPI Hong Kong)	Platinum	20,000^{*}
Japan (RIAJ)	Gold	100,000^{^}
New Zealand (RMNZ)	Platinum	15,000^{^}
Portugal (AFP)	Gold	20,000^{^}
United Kingdom (BPI)	Gold	100,000^{^}
United States (RIAA)	Diamond	10,000,000^{‡}
^{*} Sales figures based on certification alone.^{^} Shipments figures based on certification alone.^{‡} Sales+streaming figures based on certification alone.
