= Let's Hear It for the Boy =

Single by Deniece Williams

from the album Footloose: Original Soundtrack of the Paramount Motion Picture and Let's Hear It for the Boy
- B-side: "Let's Hear It for the Boy (Instrumental—Short Version)"
- Released: 1984
- Recorded: 1983
- Genre: Dance-pop; post-disco
- Length: 4:20 (Album/Single Version): 6:03 (Extended Version)
- Label: Columbia
- Songwriters: Tom Snow; Dean Pitchford
- Producer: George Duke

Deniece Williams singles chronology
"Love Won't Let Me Wait" (1984)	"Let's Hear It for the Boy" (1984)	"Next Love" (1984)

Music video
- "Let's Hear It for the Boy" on YouTube

"Let's Hear It for the Boy" is a song by Deniece Williams that appeared on the soundtrack to the feature film Footloose. The song was released as a single from both the soundtrack and her album of the song's same name released on Columbia Records. It was written by Tom Snow and Dean Pitchford and produced by George Duke. The song became Williams' second number one on the US Billboard Hot 100 on May 26, 1984. It also topped Billboard's dance and R&B charts and on the Cash Box Top 100. It peaked at number two on the UK Singles Chart, behind "Wake Me Up Before You Go-Go" by Wham!.

"Let's Hear It for the Boy" was nominated for an Academy Award for Best Original Song at the 57th Academy Awards, and was certified platinum in the US and gold in Canada and the UK by the Recording Industry Association of America, Music Canada and the British Phonographic Industry, respectively. The music video was released in mid-April 1984. The song features background vocals from George Merrill and Shannon Rubicam, who would go on to form the duo Boy Meets Girl.

== Critical reception ==
Steve Morse of the Boston Globe called the song "one of the happiest, most infectious singalongs in a long time."

Connie Johnson of the Los Angeles Times declared "With that sunny smile in her voice that is Williams' signature, she infuses the song with ingratiating charm."

== Music video ==
The music video for the song features Deniece Williams along with several young men, one of them being the singer Aaron Lohr as the young boy who is the first person to appear in the video.

== Credits and personnel ==
- Tom Snow – composition
- Dean Pitchford – composition
- Deniece Williams – lead vocals, backing vocals
- George Merrill – backing vocals
- Shannon Rubicam – backing vocals
- George Duke – producer, Memorymoog (synth bass), Prophet-5, Roland Jupiter-8, LinnDrum programming
- Paul Jackson, Jr. – guitars
- Paulinho da Costa – percussion

== Charts ==
=== Weekly charts ===
Weekly chart performance for "Let's Hear It for the Boy"
Chart (1984)	Peak position
Argentina (CAPIF)	10
Australia (Kent Music Report)	3
Belgium (Ultratop 50 Flanders)	5
Canada Top Singles (The Record)	1
Canada Top Singles (RPM)	1
Canada Adult Contemporary (RPM)	9
Europe (European Top 100 Singles)	7
Ireland (IRMA)	2
Netherlands (Dutch Top 40)	4
Netherlands (Single Top 100)	5
New Zealand (Recorded Music NZ)	2
Paraguay (UPI)	10
Peru (UPI)	8
Switzerland (Schweizer Hitparade)	19
UK Singles (Official Charts)	2
US Billboard Hot 100	1
US Adult Contemporary (Billboard)	3
US Dance Club Songs (Billboard)	1
US Hot R&B/Hip-Hop Songs (Billboard)	1
US Cash Box Top 100	1
US Top 100 Black Contemporary Singles (Cash Box)	1
West Germany (GfK)	10

=== Year-end charts ===
Year-end chart performance for "Let's Hear It for the Boy"
Chart (1984)	Position
Australia (Kent Music Report)	44
Belgium (Ultratop 50 Flanders)	57
Canada Top Singles (RPM)	21
Netherlands (Dutch Top 40)	48
Netherlands (Single Top 100)	72
New Zealand (Recorded Music NZ)	43
UK Singles (Gallup)	47
US Billboard Hot 100	13
US Adult Contemporary (Billboard)	24
US Cash Box Top 100	20
US Top 100 Black Contemporary Singles (Cash Box)	13

== Certifications ==
Certifications and sales for "Let's Hear It for the Boy"
Region	Certification	Certified units/sales
Canada (Music Canada)	Gold	50,000^{^}
United Kingdom (BPI)	Gold	400,000^{‡}
United States (RIAA)	Platinum	1,000,000^{^}
^{^} Shipments figures based on certification alone.^{‡} Sales+streaming figures based on certification alone.

== Cover versions ==
In 2011, country singer Jana Kramer covered the song for the remake of Footloose and its accompanying soundtrack album.

In 2017, the song was covered by UK hi-NRG dance artist Allan Jay in aid of the Retired Greyhound Trust and their Let's Hear It for the Boy campaign.

== See also ==
- List of Billboard Hot 100 number-one singles of 1984
