= Footloose =

1984 film by Herbert Ross

- Theatrical release poster
- Directed by: Herbert Ross
- Written by: Dean Pitchford
- Produced by: Lewis J. Rachmil; Craig Zadan
- Starring: Kevin Bacon; Lori Singer; Dianne Wiest; John Lithgow
- Cinematography: Ric Waite
- Edited by: Paul Hirsch
- Music by: Tom Snow; Jim Steinman; Kenny Loggins; Dean Pitchford; Miles Goodman
- Production company: IndieProd
- Distributed by: Paramount Pictures
- Release date: February 17, 1984
- Running time: 107 minutes
- Country: United States
- Language: English
- Budget: $7.5 million
- Box office: $80 million (domestic)

Footloose is a 1984 American musical drama film directed by Herbert Ross and written by Dean Pitchford. It tells the story of Ren McCormack (Kevin Bacon), a teenager from Chicago who moves to a small town, where he attempts to overturn a ban on dancing enforced by the efforts of a local minister (John Lithgow).

The film was released on February 17, 1984, by Paramount Pictures, and received mixed reviews from critics, but was a box office success, grossing $80 million in North America, becoming the seventh highest-grossing film of 1984. The songs "Footloose" by Kenny Loggins and "Let's Hear It for the Boy" by Deniece Williams were nominated for the Academy Award for Best Original Song.

== Plot ==
Chicago natives Ren McCormack and his mother Ethel move to the small town of Bomont, Utah, to live with Ren's aunt and uncle. At church he meets the strict Reverend Shaw Moore, his wife Vi, and their carefree and rebellious daredevil daughter Ariel.

At school, Ren befriends Willard Hewitt. He learns that the town council has banned dancing and rock music within the town boundary, though Reverend Moore's influence stretches beyond Bomont. He even gets fined by the police for having his music up too loud. Ren falls for Ariel, angering her boyfriend Chuck Cranston, who challenges Ren to a game of chicken involving tractors; Ren wins when his shoelace gets caught on the tractor's pedal, preventing him from jumping away.

Seeing Ren as a bad influence, Reverend Moore forbids Ariel from seeing Ren. Across state lines, Ren takes Willard, Ariel, and her friend Rusty to a honky-tonk. Willard is embarrassed he cannot dance and upon seeing Rusty dancing with a stranger, he winds up getting in a fight; the group then leaves the bar.

On the drive home, Ariel describes how, five years earlier, her older brother died in a car accident after a night of alcohol and dancing. Their father then persuaded the town council to enact strict anti-liquor, anti-drug, and anti-dance laws. Ren decides to challenge the dancing and rock music ban so the high school can hold a senior prom.

Ren teaches Willard to dance so Willard can impress Rusty. Chuck confronts Ariel about her feelings for Ren and they get into a physical altercation before breaking up. Ren helps Ariel conceal the physical assault, and Ariel gifts Ren a music box. They kiss, cementing their relationship.

Someone throws a brick through Ren's window with the words, "Burn in Hell". When his uncle criticizes Ren's outspoken behavior, Ethel tells Ren that though his actions cost her her job, he should stand up for what he believes is right.

With Ariel's help, Ren goes before the town council to advocate revoking the anti-dancing law. He reads Bible verses and cites the scriptural significance of dancing to rejoice, exercise, and celebrate. Though Reverend Moore is moved, the council ultimately votes against Ren. Vi supports Ren and tells Shaw that he cannot be everyone's father and that he is hardly one to Ariel.

Despite discussing with Ren his own family losses and Ariel telling her father she is not a virgin, Reverend Moore does not change his stance. He finds members of his congregation burning library books that they claim endanger the town's youth. Moore chastises the book burners and sends them home.

That Sunday, Reverend Moore asks his congregation to pray for the students putting on the prom in a grain mill just over the county line beyond Bomont's jurisdiction, thereby signifying his consent for the dance, to the students’ delight.

On prom night, Moore and Vi listen outside the mill. The high school students, sitting on benches as the music plays, finally begin dancing when Ren and Ariel arrive and take the dance floor. Chuck and his friends arrive to ruin the prom and attack Ren. They begin assaulting Willard, who only starts fighting after his date Rusty’s consent. Ren joins the fight to help Willard and knocks Chuck unconscious. Ren, Ariel, Willard and Rusty rejoin the prom and dance the night away.

== Cast ==
- Kevin Bacon as Ren McCormack
- Lori Singer as Ariel Moore
- John Lithgow as Reverend Shaw Moore
- Dianne Wiest as Vi Moore
- Chris Penn as Willard
- Sarah Jessica Parker as Rusty
- John Laughlin as Woody
- Elizabeth Gorcey as Wendy Jo
- Frances Lee McCain as Ethel McCormack
- Jim Youngs as Chuck
- Lynne Marta as Lulu
- Timothy Scott as Andy Beamis
- Andrea Hays as bar patron (uncredited)

== Production ==
Dean Pitchford came up with the idea for Footloose in 1979 and teamed up with Daniel Melnick's IndieProd who set the production up at 20th Century Fox in 1981. Pitchford wrote the screenplay (his first) and most of the lyrics. However, Fox put it into turnaround. In 1982, Paramount Pictures made a pay-or-play deal for the film. When negotiations with Herbert Ross initially stalled, Ron Howard was approached to direct the film but he turned it down to direct Splash instead. Michael Cimino was hired by Paramount to direct the film, his first film since Heaven's Gate.

After a month of working on the film, the studio fired Cimino, who was making extravagant demands for the production, including demanding an additional $250,000 for his work, and ended up hiring Ross.

=== Casting ===
Tom Cruise and Rob Lowe were both slated to play the lead. The producers were impressed with Cruise because of the famous underwear dance sequence in Risky Business, but he was unavailable for the part because he was filming All the Right Moves. Lowe auditioned three times and had the dancing ability and the "neutral teen" look that the director wanted, but injury prevented him from taking the part. Christopher Atkins claims that he was all set and guaranteed to be cast as Ren, but lost the role due to his excessive partying lifestyle at the time and blowing the audition. Bacon had been offered the main role for the Stephen King film Christine at the same time that he was asked to do the screen test for Footloose. He chose to take the gamble on the screen test. After watching his earlier film Diner, the director persuaded the producers to go with Bacon.

The film also stars Lori Singer as Reverend Moore's independent daughter Ariel, a role for which Madonna and Haviland Morris also auditioned. Valerie Bertinelli and Jennifer Jason Leigh were also considered. Dianne Wiest appears as Vi, the Reverend's devoted yet conflicted wife.

Tracy Nelson was considered for the role of Rusty.

=== Filming ===
Principal photography began on May 9, 1983, and took place at various locations in Utah County, Utah. The high school and tractor scenes were filmed in and around Payson and Payson High School. The church scenes were filmed at the First Presbyterian Church in American Fork, while the steel mill was the Geneva Steel facility in Vineyard and The Lehi Roller Mills were the location where Bacon's character worked (Bacon briefly worked at the roller mill as research for his performance). The drive-in scenes were filmed in Provo at what was then a branch of the Hi-Spot burger chain. The restaurant chain closed in the late 1980s, and there is now an auto parts store at that location. The bar scene was filmed at The Silver Spur bar in downtown Provo. The bar and other surrounding buildings were demolished to make way for the Utah Valley Convention Center.

For his dance scene in the warehouse, Bacon said he had four stunt doubles: "I had a stunt double, a dance double [Peter Tramm] and two gymnastics doubles."

=== Film inspiration ===
Footloose is loosely based on the town of Elmore City, Oklahoma. The town had banned dancing since its founding in 1898 in an attempt to decrease the amount of heavy drinking. One advocate of the dancing ban was the Reverend from the nearby town of Hennepin, F. R. Johnson. He said, "No good has ever come from a dance. If you have a dance somebody will crash it and they'll be looking for only two things—women and booze. When boys and girls hold each other, they get sexually aroused. You can believe what you want, but one thing leads to another." Because of the ban on dancing, the town never held a prom. In February 1980, the junior class of Elmore City's high school made national news when they requested permission to hold a junior prom and it was granted. The request to overturn the ban to hold the prom was met with a 2–2 decision from the school board when school board president Raymond Lee broke the tie with the words, "Let 'em dance."

== Soundtrack ==
The soundtrack was released in cassette, 8-track tape, vinyl, reel-to-reel and CD format. The 1984 open reel release was among the last commercial releases on the format. The soundtrack was also re-released on CD for the 15th anniversary of the film in 1999. The re-release included four new songs: "Bang Your Head (Metal Health)" by Quiet Riot, "Hurts So Good" by John Mellencamp, "Waiting for a Girl Like You" by Foreigner, and the extended 12" remix of "Dancing in the Sheets".

The album includes "Footloose" and "I'm Free (Heaven Helps the Man)", both by Kenny Loggins, "Holding Out for a Hero" by Bonnie Tyler (co-written and produced by Jim Steinman), "Girl Gets Around" by Sammy Hagar, "Never" by Australian rock band Moving Pictures, "Let's Hear It for the Boy" by Deniece Williams, "Somebody's Eyes" by Karla Bonoff, "Dancing In The Sheets" by Shalamar, and the romantic theme "Almost Paradise" by Mike Reno from Loverboy and Ann Wilson of Heart (co-written by Eric Carmen). The soundtrack went on to sell over 10 million copies in the USA. All songs in the initial release were co-written by Pitchford based on various songwriting styles: for "Holding Out for a Hero", he listened to various songs written by Steinman such as his work with Meat Loaf and then wrote the first two lines ("Where have all the good men gone/And where are all the gods?/Where's the streetwise Hercules/To fight the rising odds?") in this manner to spark Steinman's creativity.

"Footloose" and "Let's Hear It for the Boy" both topped the Billboard Hot 100 and received 1984 Academy Award nominations for Best Music (Original Song). "Footloose" also received a 1985 Golden Globe Award nomination for Best Original Song – Motion Picture.

Composer Miles Goodman adapted and orchestrated the film's score.

The music from the soundtrack was released prior to the film's premiere. The filmmakers felt that songs produced a stronger emotional response from people already familiar with them, which heightened the experience of watching the movie. The music video for "Footloose" had scenes from the movie, rather than footage of Loggins.

According to Bacon, whenever he attends at weddings, the DJs would play "Footloose" and people would start clapping for him like "a trained monkey". He would request DJs to not play the song so he would not look like one.

== Reception ==
=== Critical response ===
The film received mixed reviews from critics. Chicago Sun-Times critic Roger Ebert called it "a seriously confused movie that tries to do three things, and does all of them badly. It wants to tell the story of a conflict in a town, it wants to introduce some flashy teenage characters and part of the time it wants to be a music video." Dave Denby in New York rechristened the film "Schlockdance", writing: "Footloose may be a hit, but it's trash – high powered fodder for the teen market... The only person to come out of the film better off is the smooth-cheeked, pug-nosed Bacon, who gives a cocky but likable Mr. Cool performance."

Jane Lamacraft reassessed the film for Sight and Sound's "Forgotten pleasures of the multiplex" feature in 2010, writing "Nearly three decades on, Bacon's vest-clad set-piece dance in a flour mill looks cheesily 1980s, but the rest of Ross's drama wears its age well, real song-and-dance joy for the pre-Glee generation."

On the review aggregator website Rotten Tomatoes, 55% of 47 critics' reviews are positive, with an average rating of 5.8/10. The website's consensus reads: "There's not much dancing, but what's there is great. The rest of the time, Footloose is a nice hunk of trashy teenage cheese." On Metacritic, the film has a weighted average score of 42 out of 100 based on 12 critics, indicating "mixed or average" reviews.

=== Box office ===
The film grossed $80,035,403 domestically. It became the seventh highest-grossing film of 1984.

=== Accolades ===
Award	Category	Nominee(s)	Result	Ref.
Academy Awards	Best Original Song	"Footloose"; Music and Lyrics by Kenny Loggins and Dean Pitchford	Nominated	
Academy Awards	Best Original Song	"Let's Hear It for the Boy"; Music and Lyrics by Dean Pitchford and Tom Snow	Nominated	
Golden Globe Awards	Best Original Song	"Footloose"; Music and Lyrics by Kenny Loggins and Dean Pitchford	Nominated	
Grammy Awards	Best Pop Vocal Performance, Male	"Footloose" – Kenny Loggins	Nominated	
Grammy Awards	Best Pop Vocal Performance, Female	"Let's Hear It for the Boy" – Deniece Williams	Nominated	
Grammy Awards	Best R&B Performance by a Duo or Group with Vocal	"Dancing in the Sheets" – Shalamar	Nominated	
Grammy Awards	Best Rhythm and Blues Song	"Dancing in the Sheets" – Dean Pitchford and Bill Wolfer	Nominated	
Grammy Awards	Best Album of Original Score Written for a Motion Picture or a Television Special	Footloose – Various Artists (Eric Carmen, Michael Gore, Sammy Hagar, Kenny Loggins, Dean Pitchford, Tom Snow, Jim Steinman, and Bill Wolfer)	Nominated	
ShoWest Convention	Breakthrough Performer of the Year	Lori Singer	Won	
Young Artist Awards	Best Family Motion Picture – Musical or Comedy		Nominated	
Young Artist Awards	Best Young Supporting Actress in a Motion Picture – Musical, Comedy, Adventure or Drama	Sarah Jessica Parker	Nominated	

AFI's 100 Years...100 Songs

- "Footloose" – #96

== Musical adaptation ==
In 1998, a musical version of Footloose premiered. Featuring many of the songs from the film, the show has been presented on London's West End, on Broadway, and elsewhere. The musical is generally faithful to the film version, with some slight differences in the story and characters.

== Remake ==
Paramount announced plans to fast-track a remake of Footloose. The remake was written and directed by Craig Brewer. Filming started in September 2010. It was budgeted at $25 million. It was released October 14, 2011.
