= Footloose (song) =

1984 single by Kenny Loggins

- Standard picture sleeve (7-inch single pictured)

Single by Kenny Loggins

from the album Footloose: Original Soundtrack of the Paramount Motion Picture
- B-side: "Swear Your Love"
- Released: January 11, 1984
- Recorded: 1983
- Genre: Rock; country; rockabilly; heartland rock; pop rock
- Length: 3:48 (album version); 3:42 (single edit); 2:56 (video edit)
- Label: Columbia
- Songwriters: Kenny Loggins; Dean Pitchford
- Producers: Kenny Loggins; Lee DeCarlo

Kenny Loggins singles chronology
"Welcome to Heartlight" (1983)	"Footloose" (1984)	"I'm Free (Heaven Helps the Man)" (1984)

Music video
- "Footloose" on YouTube

"Footloose" is a song co-written and recorded by American singer-songwriter Kenny Loggins. It was released in January 1984 as the first of two singles by Loggins from the 1984 film of the same name (the other one being "I'm Free (Heaven Helps the Man)"). The song spent three weeks at number one, March 31—April 14, 1984, on the US Billboard Hot 100, becoming Loggins' only chart-topper, and was the first of two number-one hits from the film. Billboard ranked it at the No. 4 song for 1984.

The song was very well received, and is one of the most recognizable songs recorded by Loggins. When the American Film Institute released its AFI's 100 Years...100 Songs, "Footloose" reached the 96th position. The song was covered by country music artist Blake Shelton for the 2011 remake of the 1984 film.

It was nominated for an Academy Award for Best Original Song at the 1985 ceremony, losing to Stevie Wonder's "I Just Called to Say I Love You" from The Woman in Red.

The single version is slightly shorter in length compared to the album version. It begins with a soloed guitar track instead of a drum intro, and features more prominent backing vocals in the mix, particularly towards the end of the song.

In 2018, it was selected for preservation in the National Recording Registry by the Library of Congress as being "culturally, historically, or aesthetically significant".

The song‘s chorus has repeatedly been noted for resembling the main guitar riff of James Gang's "Funk 49".

== Music video ==
The music video for "Footloose" was directed by Brian Grant. It uses the single version and features several scenes from the film, in particular the warehouse where Kevin Bacon's character performs an unorchestrated dance routine (which was actually performed to a different song in the film itself).

== Personnel ==
- Kenny Loggins – lead vocals
- Neil Larsen – keyboards
- Steve Wood – keyboards, backing vocals ("Take ahold of your soul")
- Buzz Feiten – guitar
- Nathan East – bass guitar, vocals ("Put your feet on the ground")
- Michael Boddicker – synth bass, percussion
- Tris Imboden – drums
- Paulinho da Costa – percussion
- Marilyn Dorman, Rick Washington, and Lynn Fanelli – backing vocals

== Charts ==
=== Weekly charts ===
Chart (1984)	Peak position
Argentina (CAPIF)	6
Australia (Kent Music Report)	1
Austria (Ö3 Austria Top 40)	8
Belgium (VRT Top 30 Flanders)	26
Canada Top Singles (RPM)	1
Canada (The Record)	5
Colombia (UPI)	1
Finland (Suomen virallinen lista)	11
Ireland (IRMA)	4
New Zealand (Recorded Music NZ)	1
Paraguay (UPI)	3
Peru (UPI)	1
Puerto Rico (UPI)	6
South Africa (Springbok)	1
Switzerland (Schweizer Hitparade)	4
UK Singles (Official Charts)	6
US Billboard Hot 100	1
West Germany (Media Control Charts)	4

Chart (2019)	Peak position
Poland Airplay (ZPAV)	52

=== Year-end charts ===
Chart (1984)	Rank
Australia (Kent Music Report)	7
Canada	17
New Zealand	9
South Africa	12
UK Singles (Gallup)	82
US Billboard Hot 100	4

=== All-time charts ===
Chart (1958–2018)	Position
US Billboard Hot 100	313

== Certifications ==
Region	Certification	Certified units/sales
Australia (ARIA)	Platinum	70,000^{^}
Canada (Music Canada)	Platinum	100,000^{^}
Denmark (IFPI Danmark)	Platinum	90,000^{‡}
Germany (BVMI)	Gold	250,000^{‡}
Italy (FIMI)	Gold	25,000^{‡}
New Zealand (RMNZ)	5× Platinum	150,000^{‡}
Spain (Promusicae)	Gold	30,000^{‡}
United Kingdom (BPI)	3× Platinum	1,800,000^{‡}
United States (RIAA)	Platinum	1,000,000^{^}
^{^} Shipments figures based on certification alone.^{‡} Sales+streaming figures based on certification alone.

== Blake Shelton version ==
"Footloose"

Song by Blake Shelton

from the album Footloose
- Released: November 8, 2011
- Genre: Country pop
- Length: 3:38
- Label: Atlantic; Warner Records Nashville
- Songwriters: Kenny Loggins; Dean Pitchford

Blake Shelton covered the song for the 2011 remake of the film. Shelton's version also appears on the film's soundtrack. It charted at number 63 on the US Billboard Hot Country Songs chart in November 2011. A music video for Shelton's version of the song, directed by Shaun Silva, premiered in October 2011.

=== Music video ===
The video opens with Blake Shelton driving a pickup truck into a drive-in theater screening the 2011 remake of the 1984 movie wherein the manager and ticket seller tells him that the film was only about to start. He then enters the compound where the cinema patrons watch the film while his backing band set up their instruments, which make the patrons take notice of them. Shelton and his band begin to perform the song and the theater patrons join in dancing while scenes from the film are played. The music video was filmed in early 2011 at the Hi-Way 50 Drive In theater located in Lewisburg, Tennessee.

=== Personnel ===
- Blake Shelton – vocals

=== Charts ===
Chart (2011)	Peak position
Canada Hot 100 (Billboard)	59
Canada Country (Billboard)	35
US Billboard Hot 100	63
US Hot Country Songs (Billboard)	53

=== Certifications ===
Region	Certification	Certified units/sales
United States (RIAA)	Gold	500,000^{‡}
^{‡} Sales+streaming figures based on certification alone.

== Other cover versions ==
VeggieTales performed this song on the album Bob and Larry Sing the 80's.

The final episode of the second season of Regular Show titled "Karaoke Video", where Pops (voiced by Sam Marin) sings his version of the song towards the end.

American pop punk band Good Charlotte covered the song for the film Not Another Teen Movie.

Sam Evans (Chord Overstreet) and Artie Abrams (Kevin McHale) performed this song in the Glee season 4 episode "Girls (and Boys) On Film".

Andrew Goodwin and David Johnson sang a cover of this song for Final Space, season 2, episode 4, "The Other Side".

The song is featured on the dance-based music game Just Dance Kids 2014 and covered by The Just Dance Kids. It is also featured on Just Dance 2018 as a cover by Marc Martel (credited as "Top Culture" in game).

Swedish band Herreys recorded a Swedish version for their album Diggi Loo, Diggi Ley.

== See also ==
- List of Billboard Hot 100 number-one singles of 1984
