= Dean Pitchford =

American songwriter, screenwriter, director, actor, and novelist

- Born: July 29, 1951 (age 74); Honolulu, Territory of Hawaii
- Occupations: Songwriter; screenwriter; director; actor; novelist

Dean Pitchford (born July 29, 1951) is an American songwriter, screenwriter, director, actor, and novelist. His work has earned him an Oscar and a Golden Globe Award, as well as nominations for three additional Oscars, two more Golden Globes, eight Grammy Awards, and two Tony Awards.

== Early life ==
Pitchford was born in Honolulu, where he attended Catholic schools, graduating in 1968 from Saint Louis High School. He began his performance career as an actor and a singer with the Honolulu Community Theatre (now Diamond Head Theatre), the Honolulu Symphony Orchestra and the Honolulu Theatre for Youth, among others. While studying at Yale University, Pitchford performed with numerous campus drama groups, but his focus gradually turned off-campus, where he worked with the Wooster Square Revival, an experimental theatre company that offered acting opportunities to recovering addicts and alcoholics.

In 1969, Pitchford returned to Honolulu as an assistant to authors Faye Hammel and Sylvan Levey in updating the popular guidebook Hawai'i on $5 and $10 A Day, and researching Trans World Airlines' Budget Guide to Hawai'i, the first of a series of guidebooks that would eventually turn into the popular series TWA Getaway Guides.

== Performing ==
In 1971, Pitchford was cast in the off-Broadway musical Godspell in New York City. He also starred in Godspell at Ford's Theatre. Bob Fosse cast Pitchford as Pippin in the Broadway show of the same name in 1975. While in Pippin, Pitchford acted, sang, and danced in over 100 commercials for such products as Dr Pepper, McDonald's, Lay's, and M&M's.

== Early songwriting ==
As a result of performing his early songwriting efforts in cabarets around Manhattan, he was invited to write with such composers as Stephen Schwartz, Alan Menken and Rupert Holmes. In 1979, he collaborated with recording artist and cabaret performer Peter Allen to write new songs for Allen's one-man Broadway revue, Up in One.

With composer Michael Gore, Pitchford collaborated on three songs for Alan Parker's 1980 motion picture Fame; these were "Red Light," a disco hit for singer Linda Clifford; the symphonic/rock finale "I Sing the Body Electric"; and the title song "Fame," which became a multi-platinum, international best seller for Irene Cara. That song earned Gore and Pitchford an Oscar, a Golden Globe, and a Grammy nomination for Song of the Year (1981). They also received a Grammy nomination for Best Soundtrack Album for a Motion Picture, Television or Other Visual Media.

When Pitchford was signed by Warner Brothers Publishing (1981) he began collaborating with a variety of songwriters. Among the first songs whose lyrics he wrote in collaboration with composer Tom Snow was "Don't Call It Love," which was first recorded by Kim Carnes on her 1981 album Mistaken Identity; the selection charted in the U.S. country singles top-ten for Dolly Parton in 1985 and was named the BMI Country Song of the Year.

For the ill-fated 1981 movie The Legend of the Lone Ranger, Pitchford wrote a narrative ballad, "The Man In the Mask." This was spoken (throughout the movie) and sung (at its beginning and end) by Merle Haggard.

"You Should Hear How She Talks About You," another Snow/Pitchford composition, was a Top 5 hit for Melissa Manchester for which she won the Grammy Award for Best Female Pop Vocal Performance in 1983. That same year, Pitchford, Kenny Loggins and Steve Perry wrote and composed "Don't Fight It," a Top 20 hit that was Grammy-nominated in the Best Pop Vocal Duo category. With musical director Michael Miller, he wrote the theme song for the weekly dance-music show Solid Gold (1980–88).

== Screenwriting ==
Inspired by a 1980 news story about Elmore City, Oklahoma, a town which had finally lifted an 80-year-old ban on dancing, Pitchford wrote the screenplay for the motion picture Footloose (1984). He collaborated on the nine-song score with Kenny Loggins, Eric Carmen, Jim Steinman, Sammy Hagar and others. The film, directed by Herbert Ross, opened at No. 1 and was, at the time, the highest-grossing February release in film history.

When the soundtrack album hit No. 1 on the Billboard album charts, it deposed Michael Jackson's Thriller and held that position for 10 weeks. It went on top charts all over the world, eventually selling more than 17 million albums. Kenny Loggins's single of the title song hit No. 1 on March 31, 1984, and stayed there for three weeks. Five weeks later (May 26, 1984) Deniece Williams's "Let's Hear It for the Boy" went to No. 1, as well. Four more songs from the soundtrack charted in the Top 40; "Almost Paradise", which reached No. 7, was co-written with Eric Carmen, and was performed by Mike Reno of Loverboy and Ann Wilson of Heart; "Dancing in the Sheets", which reached No. 17, was co-written with Bill Wolfer, and was performed by Shalamar; "I'm Free (Heaven Helps the Man)", which reached No. 22 and, like the film's title track, was co-written with, and performed by, Kenny Loggins; and "Holding Out for a Hero", which reached No. 34, was co-written with Jim Steinman, and was performed by Bonnie Tyler. "Footloose" was nominated for a Golden Globe as Best Song; and "Footloose" and "Let's Hear It for the Boy" (co-written with Tom Snow) both received Academy Award nominations (1985). Pitchford received two Grammy nominations: Best Soundtrack Album for a Motion Picture, Television or Other Visual Media, and Best R&B Song "Dancing in the Sheets."

Paramount Pictures's remake of Footloose, which was again based on Pitchford's original screenplay and featured six of his songs, was released in October 2011. Blake Shelton had a hit with his re-recording of the title song.

Next Pitchford wrote the screenplay of, and collaborated on the authorship and composition of all the songs for, the 1989 musical film Sing.

== Directing ==
Pitchford wrote and directed a short film, The Washing Machine Man (1991), for Chanticleer Films; it was invited to be shown out-of-competition at the Sundance Film Festival. That led to Pitchford being hired as director of HBO's Blood Brothers: The Joey DiPaolo Story (1992), which won that year's Cable Ace Award for Best Children's Program.

== Later songwriting ==
With Marvin Hamlisch, Pitchford wrote Welcome, the Invocation for the Opening Ceremony of the 1984 Summer Olympics; it was performed by a choir of 1,000 voices in the Los Angeles Memorial Coliseum. He co-wrote the song "Did You Hear Thunder?," with Tom Snow, for the George Benson album While the City Sleeps... (1986). For the motion picture Chances Are (1989), Pitchford and Tom Snow composed "After All," an international hit for Cher and Peter Cetera which garnered Pitchford his fourth Oscar nomination; and two years later Pitchford's and Gore's "All the Man That I Need" was a worldwide No. 1 song for Whitney Houston. The soundtrack for the 1988 film Oliver & Company, to which Pitchford and Tom Snow contributed "Streets of Gold," sung by Ruth Pointer, was Grammy-nominated.

Pitchford contributed lyrics to Richard Marx's song "That Was Lulu" for Marx's 1989 album Repeat Offender, with whom he also wrote "Through My Eyes" for Martina McBride for the Bambi II soundtrack. He worked for many years on a stage adaptation of Footloose, which finally opened on Broadway on October 22, 1998. The original cast recording was nominated for a Grammy in the category of Best Musical Show Album. After over 700 performances, the show closed on July 2, 2000. The musical continues to be performed all over the U.S. and around the world.

The stage musical of Carrie, with Pitchford's lyrics (music by Michael Gore, book by Lawrence D. Cohen), was presented by MCC Theater in New York City as the final offering in their 2011–12 season. A previous production of that show had been presented in 1988 by the Royal Shakespeare Company, first in Stratford-upon-Avon in England, and then in a famously short run on Broadway at the Virginia Theatre. The 2012 MCC production was nominated for Best Revival by numerous critics's groups, including the Drama Desk and Outer Critics Circle awards.

Australian film star Hugh Jackman won a Tony Award for his portrayal of songwriter Peter Allen in The Boy from Oz (2003), in which he sang songs ("Not the Boy Next Door" and "Once Before I Go") which had been written and composed more than two decades earlier by the real Allen (by then deceased) and Pitchford. Jackman repeated his performances of those songs when he returned to New York City in his one-man concert, "Hugh Jackman - Back on Broadway" (2011).

Pitchford has contributed songs to The Lizzie McGuire Movie (2003), Shrek 2 (2004), Ice Princess (2005) and Bambi II (2006).

The 1984 recording of "Footloose" was named to the 2017 National Recording Registry of the Library of Congress in March 2018.

In 2024, Dean was inducted into the Songwriters Hall of Fame.

== Fiction writing ==
G. P. Putnam's Sons/Penguin Group published Pitchford's first young adult novel, The Big One-Oh, in March 2007, and Random House's Listening Library released the audiobook (read by Pitchford) in January 2008. That recording received a 2008 Grammy nomination in the category of Best Spoken Word Album for Children. His second novel, Captain Nobody, was published by G.P. Putnam's Sons/Penguin Group and released on audiobook by Random House in 2009. That recording received a 2009 nomination in the same Grammy category. Putnam/Penguin published Pitchford's third novel, Nickel Bay Nick, in 2013.

== Personal life ==
Pitchford is openly gay. His song "If I Never Met You" was inspired by Pitchford's boyfriend at the time, who later became his husband. "If I Never Met You" appeared on Barbra Streisand's 1999 album A Love Like Ours.
