= Tom Snow =

American songwriter (born 1947)

- Born: Thomas Righter Snow; 1947 (age 78–79); Princeton, New Jersey, US
- Occupations: Songwriter, singer-songwriter (1970s)
- Instrument: Keyboards
- Label: Capitol Records (solo releases)
- Website: www.tomsnowmusic.com

Thomas Righter Snow (born 1947 in Princeton, New Jersey) is an American songwriter.

== Biography ==
Snow has written songs for Gayle McCormick ("Even a Fool Would Let Go" with Kerry Chater – a song covered by a number of artists including Kenny Rogers and Joe Cocker). "Love Not War" (with Barbara Griffin), Olivia Newton-John ("Deeper Than the Night", "Make a Move on Me"), and Melissa Manchester ("You Should Hear How She Talks About You"), Cher, The Pointer Sisters' million-selling 1980 hit "He's So Shy" (with lyrics by Cynthia Weil), Barbra Streisand, Rita Coolidge ("You", which was also an Australian top 10 hit for Marcia Hines in 1977 and in 2005), Barry Manilow ("Somewhere Down the Road", a song which was written with Cynthia Weil and performed on Ally McBeal), Randy Crawford, Diana Ross ("Gettin' Ready for Love"), Bonnie Raitt ("Love Sneakin' Up On You"), Leo Sayer, Bette Midler, Michael Johnson ("I'll Always Love You"), Dolly Parton, Captain & Tennille, Kim Carnes ("Don't Call It Love"), Dionne Warwick ("More than Fascination"), Linda Ronstadt ("Don't Know Much" duet with Aaron Neville), Trisha Yearwood, Sérgio Mendes ("Alibis," "Real Life"), Amy Grant ("Good For Me"), and Christina Aguilera ("So Emotional"). He also co-wrote "Dreaming of You" for the crossover Mexican-American star Selena, which was released posthumously in 1995.

Along with Dean Pitchford, Snow wrote the song "Let's Hear It for the Boy" sung by Deniece Williams for the film soundtrack Footloose, which climbed to number one on the U.S. Billboard Hot 100 in 1984 and peaked at number two on the UK Singles Chart. The track was certified Platinum by the RIAA and nominated for an Academy Award for Best Song. He also wrote the song "Did You Hear Thunder" with Pitchford for the George Benson album While the City Sleeps... (1986). Other films that Snow has written songs for include Oliver & Company, The Lion King II: Simba's Pride, Scooby Doo on Zombie Island with Jack Feldman and Marty Panzer, About Last Night... ("So Far, So Good" and "Natural Love" sung by Sheena Easton), Chances Are (Oscar-nominated song "After All" sung by Cher and Peter Cetera).

On November 11, 2011, at an independent TED event, Snow delivered a TED talk titled "The Mulch Pile."

Snow also released solo albums in the 1970s and 1980s.

Tom Snow was a member of the band Country, which released a sole album on Clean Records, a subsidiary of Atlantic Records in 1971. Snow sang co-lead and played piano. The band included Michael Fondiler, who shared lead vocals and played rhythm guitar, Bob DeSimone on drums, Steve Fondiler on bass and Ian Espinoza on lead guitar and dobro. Their little-known but assured self-titled debut featured Mark and Matt Andes of Spirit and Jo Jo Gunne and Lowell George of Little Feat. Vexed by management troubles – Michael O'Bryant was replaced by Peter Asher – the album sank without a trace. Re-released on the Slipstream label in 2013, the album garnered favourable reviews.

Snow left after the first album, but the rest of the band continued, and a second album was recorded but never released. A single from those sessions, "Strange Arrangement", was released, which featured Snow and the rest of the band but was credited as a solo work by Ian Espinoza. It also failed and Clean Records pulled the plug. The band now has the original masters and plans are afoot to finally release this album, which was to be entitled Bigalo Jive. UK fanzine Fantastic Expedition told the Country story in its Issue No. 8.

Snow co-wrote Melissa Manchester's "Your Love is Where I Live", which also features Stevie Wonder, on Manchester's You Gotta Love the Life (2015).

== Discography ==
Solo albums

- Taking It All in Stride (Capitol, 1975)
- Tom Snow (Capitol, 1976)
- Hungry Nights (Arista, 1982)
