= Mie to 未唯mie: 1981–2023 All Time Best =

Compilation album by Mie
- Released: March 1, 2023
- Recorded: 1981–2023
- Genre: J-pop; pop rock; heavy metal; jazz
- Language: Japanese; English
- Label: Victor

Mie chronology
Shinshun Pink Lady Night: 10th Anniversary Special Live (2022)	Mie to 未唯mie: 1981–2023 All Time Best (2023)

Mie to 未唯mie: 1981–2023 All Time Best is a compilation album by Japanese singer Mie. Released through Victor on March 1, 2023 to coincide with the 40th anniversary of Mie's solo career, the album compiles her solo works from 1981 to 2006, plus the unreleased song "Oyasuminasai" and her cover of Leonard Cohen's "Hallelujah".

== Track listing ==
Disc 1
No.	Title	Lyrics	Music	Arrangement	Length
1.	"Brahms Loves Rock (ブラームスはロックがお好き, Burāmusu wa Rokku ga o Suki)"	Yoko Aki	Ryudo Uzaki	Mitsuo Hagita
2.	"Call Girl - Maria at Dawn - (コールガール ―夜明けのマリア―, Kōru Gāru ― Yoake no Maria ―)"	Chinfa Kan	HARRY	Eiji Kawamura
3.	"Come Back (カムバック, Kamu Bakku)"	Mayumi Shinozuka	HARRY	Kawamura
4.	"Shampoo (シャンプー, Shanpū)"	Yoshiko Miura	Kōji Tamaki	Kenji Omura
5.	"Never"	Gorō Matsui	Dean Pitchford; Michael Gore	Osamu Totsuka
6.	"Dancing Love"	Miharu Kanagami	Kyōhei Tsutsumi	Yutaka Mogi
7.	"Memory"	Keiko Asō	Gary Harrison; J. D. Martin	Totsuka
8.	"I Love How You Love Me"	Barry Mann; Larry Kolber	Mann; Kolber	Makoto Matsushita
9.	"Mō Umi e Nanka Ikanai (もう海へなんか行かない; "I Don't Go to the Sea Anymore")"	Takashi Matsumoto	Tsutsumi	Tsutsumi
10.	"Hai to Diamond (灰とダイヤモンド, Hai to Daiyamondo; "Diamond in the Ashes")"	Saburō Higashimoto	Tsutsumi	Makoto Matsushita
11.	"Dreamer"	Masumi Kawamura	Tsutsumi	Kazuo Otani
12.	"Hirugao Roman (昼顔恋話(ロマン); "Daytime Romance")"	Kawamura	Tsutsumi	Keiichi Oku
13.	"Ima ga, Choice (いまが、Choice, Ima ga, Choisu; "Now, the Choice")"	Midori Edo	Hideo Matsufuji	Tetsutarō Sakurai
14.	"Otonadōshi (おとなどうし; "Adults")"	Yūho Iwasato	Matsufuji	Matsufuji
15.	"Sweet"	Edo	Sakurai	Sakurai
16.	"Heisei iki Onna Ade Otoko (平成粋女・艶男; "Heisei Refined Woman, Shimmering Man")"	Masao Urino	Daisuke Inoue	Mikiya Katakura
17.	"Love Jail."	Yumi Yoshimoto	Kazuya Miyauchi	Miyauchi

Disc 2
No.	Title	Lyrics	Music	Arrangement	Length
1.	"Hallelujah (ハレルヤ, Hareruya)"	Leonard Cohen	Cohen	Akira Inoue
2.	"Aubade ~Yoake no Uta~ (aubade～夜明けの詩～, Ōbādo ~Yoake no Uta; "aubade ~Poetry of Dawn~")"	Mitsuyo Nemoto	Yuriko Hoshi	A. Inoue
3.	"Think of Me"	Nemoto; Kenji "Jino" Hino	Hino; Ippei Brown	Hino
4.	"Chijō no Angel e (地上のAngelへ, Chijō no Enjeru e; "The Angel on the Ground")"	Nemoto; Hiromi Mori	G:son; Marcos Ubeda	Gō "Fisher" Satō
5.	"Watashi no Mama ~ maybe it's a life (私のまま～maybe it’s a life; "Stay with Me ~ maybe it's a life")"	Mori	G:son; Stefan Brunzell	Satō
6.	"Dance with Kitty! (キティとダンス！, Kiti to Dansu!)"	Toshiaki Koyama	Shintarō Ashizawa	Ashizawa
7.	"Sapphire no Sora ni (サファイアの空に, Safaia no Sora ni; "In the Sapphire Sky")"	Kumiko Niino	Yoshihisa Shirakawa	Shirakawa
8.	"Nobody Knows Me (But Only Heaven)" (Mie with X.Y.Z.→A)	Minoru Niihara	Funky Sueyoshi	Mie; X.Y.Z.→A
9.	"Oyasuminasai (おやすみなさい; "Good Night")"	Taiji Nakamura	Nakamura	Nakamura
10.	"Raining in the Sunshine" (Demon Kakka feat. 未唯mie)	未唯mie; H.E. Demon Kakka	H.E. Demon Kakka	H.E. Demon Kakka
11.	"Arigatō no Hoshi (ありがとうの地球（ほし）; "Thank You World")"	Hiroshi Ichikura	A. Inoue	A. Inoue
12.	"Niji-iro no Yoake (虹いろの夜明け; "The Dawn of Rainbow Colors")"	Nemoto; Noritoshi Furuichi	JUNKOO; Takuya Harada	JUNKOO
13.	"Eternal Gift"	Nemoto; Mori	Toshiya Shiori	Shiori
14.	"Alright Alright"	Nemoto	Harada	Harada
