= Golden Best Mie: Hallelujah Hurricane =

Greatest hits album by Mie
- Released: 19 June 2002
- Recorded: 1981–2002
- Genre: J-pop; pop rock
- Language: Japanese; English
- Label: Sony Music House

Mie chronology
| Diamond & Gold (1992) | Golden Best Mie: Hallelujah Hurricane (2002) | me ing (2007) |

Golden Best Mie: Hallelujah Hurricane (GOLDEN☆BEST / 未唯 ハレルヤ・ハリケーン, Gōruden Besuto Mī Hareruya Harikēn) is a greatest hits album by Japanese singer Mie. Released through Sony Music House on June 19, 2002 to coincide with the 20th anniversary of Mie's solo career, the album compiles her solo works from her Victor Entertainment, CBS Sony, and Funhouse eras and includes the Japanese version of Geri Halliwell's cover of The Weather Girls song "It's Raining Men", from the 2001 film Bridget Jones's Diary.

== Track listing ==
| No. | Title | Lyrics | Music | Arrangement | Length |
|---|---|---|---|---|---|
| 1. | "Hallelujah Hurricane -It's Raining Men-" (Hareruya Harikēn - Ittsu Reiningu Men- (ハレルヤ・ハリケーン-IT'S RAINING MEN-)) | Paul Jabara; Paul Shaffer | Jabara; Shaffer |
| 2. | "Love Jail" | Yumi Yoshimoto | Kazuyuki Miyauchi | Miyauchi |
| 3. | "Shape Out" | Hiromi Mori | Kōji Tamaki | Kenji Omura |
| 4. | "F・L・T" | Jun Hashimoto | Kyōhei Tsutsumi | Akira Inoue |
| 5. | "Call Girl -Maria at Dawn-" (Kōru Gāru ― Yoake no Maria ― (コールガール ―夜明けのマリア―)) | Chinfa Kan | HARRY | Eiji Kawamura |
| 6. | "Come Back" (Kamu Bakku (カムバック)) | Mayumi Shinozuka | HARRY | Kawamura |
| 7. | "Today's My Birthday" | Yoko Aki | Ryudo Uzaki | Mitsuo Hagita |
| 8. | ""NEVER"" | Gorō Matsui | Dean Pitchford; Michael Gore | Osamu Totsuka |
| 9. | "Hai to Diamond" (Hai to Daiyamondo (灰とダイヤモンド, "Diamond in the Ashes")) | Saburō Higashimoto | Tsutsumi | Makoto Matsushita |
| 10. | "Kagami no Naka no On'na" ((鏡の中の女, "Woman in the Mirror")) | Rei Nakanishi | Takashi Ike | Kōji Makaino |
| 11. | "Mō Umi e Nanka Ikanai" ((もう海へなんか行かない, "I Don't Go to the Sea Anymore")) | Takashi Matsumoto | Tsutsumi | Tsutsumi |
| 12. | "Dakishimete -Sicilian Wind-" ((抱きしめて −Sicilian Wind−, "Hold Me -Sicilian Wind-")) | Tomoko Soryō | T. Soryō | Yasunori Soryō |
| 13. | "Dreamer" | Masumi Kawamura | Tsutsumi | Kazuo Otani |
| 14. | "Hirugao Roman" ((昼顔恋話(ロマン), "Daytime Romance")) | Kawamura | Tsutsumi | Keiichi Oku |
| 15. | "Hitori Kiri no Pillow Talk" (Hitori Kiri no Pirō Tōku (ひとりきりのピロートーク, "Lonely Pillow Talk")) | Kawamura | Tsutsumi | Oku |
| 16. | "Memory" | Keiko Asō | Gary Harrison; J. D. Martin | Totsuka |
| 17. | "Brahms Loves Rock" (Burāmusu wa Rokku ga o Suki (ブラームスはロックがお好き)) | Aki | Uzaki | Hagita |
| 18. | "Break Motion (with Naoko Amihana)" (Bureiku Mōshon (ブレイク・モーション)) | Mori | Yoshimasa Inoue | Satoshi Nakamura |
| 19. | "I Love How You Love Me" | Barry Mann; Larry Kolber | Mann; Kolber | Makoto Matsushita |
