= 4th Yokohama Film Festival =

1983 Japanese film festival edition

- Location: Yokohama Citizens Hall, Yokohama, Kanagawa, Japan
- Founded: 1980
- Festival date: 4 February 1983

The 4th Yokohama Film Festival (第4回ヨコハマ映画祭) was held on 4 February 1983 in Yokohama Citizens Hall, Yokohama, Kanagawa, Japan.

== Awards ==
- Best Film: I Are You, You Am Me
- Best Actor: Ryudo Uzaki – Tattoo Ari
- Best Actress: Ayumi Ishida – Yaju-deka
- Best New Actress:
  - Reiko Nakamura – A Pool Without Water
  - Satomi Kobayashi – I Are You, You Am Me
- Best Supporting Actor: Mitsuru Hirata – Fall Guy
- Best Supporting Actress: Masako Natsume – Dai Nippon Teikoku
- Best Director: Banmei Takahashi - Tattoo Ari
- Best New Director: Shun Nakahara – Okasare Shigan
- Best Screenplay: Wataru Kenmochi – I Are You, You Am Me
- Best Cinematography: Masaki Tamura – Farewell to the Land, Furuyashiki: A Japanese Village
- Best Independent Film: Yami Utsu Shinzō
- Special Prize:
  - Keiko Matsuzaka (Career)
  - Nobuo Nakagawa (Career)

== Best 10 ==
1. I Are You, You Am Me
2. Fall Guy
3. Tattoo Ari
4. Farewell to the Land
5. Weekend Shuffle
6. A Pool Without Water
7. To Trap a Kidnapper
8. Highteen Boogie
9. Cabaret Diary
10. Sailor Suit and Machine Gun

runner-up: Yaju-deka
