= Never (Mie album) =

NEVER

Studio album by MIE
- Released: 25 August 1984
- Genre: Pop rock
- Language: Japanese
- Label: CBS Sony

MIE chronology
Call Girl "from MIE to you" (1981)	NEVER (1984)	Diamond & Gold (1992)

Singles from NEVER
- 1. "NEVER" Released: 21 January 1984; 2. "Hai to Diamond" Released: 21 October 1984

NEVER is the third studio album by Japanese singer MIE. The album was released through CBS Sony on 25 August 1984. The title track, a Japanese-language cover of the Moving Pictures song from the Footloose soundtrack, peaked at No. 4 in Oricon's singles chart. "Never" was also used as the theme song for the TBS drama series Furyō Shōjo to Yobarete (不良少女とよばれて; Call Me a Bad Girl).

The album was reissued on October 24, 2007 as NEVER -Special Edition-, with eight bonus tracks and a DVD.

== Track listing ==
Side A

No.	Title	Lyrics	Music	Arrangement	Length
1.	"NEVER"	Gorō Matsui	Dean Pitchford; Michael Gore	Osamu Totsuka
2.	"Hungry"	Keiko Asō	Kathleen A. Parker; Alan O'Day	Totsuka
3.	"Dancing Love"	Miharu Kanagami	Kyōhei Tsutsumi	Yutaka Mogi
4.	"Memory"	Asō	Gary Harrison; J. D. Martin	Totsuka
5.	"Somebody"	Asō	Steven Diamond; Lois Blaich	Totsuka
6.	"I Love How You Love Me"	Barry Mann; Larry Kolber	Mann; Kolber	Makoto Matsushita

Side B

No.	Title	Lyrics	Music	Arrangement	Length
1.	"Otsudane" ((おつだね; "That's Good"))	Takemi Shima	Ryudo Uzaki	Totsuka
2.	"Mō Umi e Nanka Ikanai" ((もう海へなんか行かない; "I Don't Go to the Sea Anymore"))	Takashi Matsumoto	Tsutsumi	Tsutsumi
3.	"Je t'aime" (Jutemu (ジュテム; "I Love You"))	Jun Hashimoto	Tsutsumi	Masaaki Omura
4.	"Gikochinai Shibai" ((ぎこちない芝居; "Awkward Play"))	Rei Nakanishi	Takashi Ike	Kōji Makaino
5.	"Dakishimete -Sicilian Wind-" ((抱きしめて −Sicilian Wind−; "Hold Me -Sicilian Wind-"))	Tomoko Soryō	T. Soryō	Yasunori Soryō

Special Edition bonus tracks

No.	Title	Lyrics	Music	Arrangement	Length
12.	"Hai to Diamond" (Hai to Daiyamondo (灰とダイヤモンド; "Diamond in the Ashes"))	Saburō Higashimoto	Tsutsumi	Matsushita
13.	"Mega Madness" (Michael Sembello cover; originally from the Gremlins soundtrack)	Matsui	Donald Freeman; Mark Hudson; Michael Sembello	Totsuka
14.	"Kagami no Naka no On'na" ((鏡の中の女; "Woman in the Mirror"))	Nakanishi	Ike	Makaino
15.	"Dreamer"	Masumi Kawamura	Tsutsumi	Kazuo Otani
16.	"Talk Crazy to Me"	Higashimoto	O'Day; Margaret Harris	Totsuka
17.	"Hirugao Roman" ((昼顔恋話(ロマン); "Daytime Romance"))	Kawamura	Tsutsumi	Keiichi Oku
18.	"Hitori Kiri no Pillow Talk" (Hitori Kiri no Pirō Tōku (ひとりきりのピロートーク; "Lonely Pillow Talk"))	Kawamura	Tsutsumi	Oku
19.	"Manatsu no Rhythm de Daydream" (Manatsu no Rizumu de Deidorīmu (真夏のリズムで Daydream; "Daydream with Midsummer Rhythm"))	Mori	Akihiro Yoshimi	Satoshi Nakamura

Special Edition DVD

1. "NEVER" / "Somebody"
2. "Dakishimete -Sicilian Wind-"
3. "Hungry"
4. "Mega Madness"
5. "Memory"
6. "NEVER"
7. "I Love How You Love Me"

== See also ==
- 1984 in Japanese music
