= Call Girl (album) =

Call Girl "from MIE to you"

Studio album by MIE
- Released: 5 October 1982
- Recorded: 1982
- Genre: Pop rock
- Language: Japanese; English
- Label: Victor

MIE chronology
MIE Live (1981)	Call Girl "from MIE to you" (1982)	NEVER (1984)

Singles from Call Girl "from MIE to you"
- 1. "More More" Released: 21 January 1982; 2. "Call Girl -Maria at Dawn-" Released: 5 September 1982

Call Girl "from MIE to you" is the second studio album by Japanese singer MIE. The album was released on October 5, 1982 to coincide with the film Call Girl (コールガール, Kōru Gāru). It was also her last solo album under Victor Entertainment. The album was reissued on October 24, 2007 as Call Girl "from MIE to you" +2, with two bonus tracks.

== Track listing ==
Side A

No.	Title	Lyrics	Music	Arrangement	Length
1.	"Call Girl -Maria at Dawn-" (Kōru Gāru ― Yoake no Maria ― (コールガール ―夜明けのマリア―))	Chinfa Kan	HARRY	Eiji Kawamura
2.	"Midnight Rainy Blues" (Midonaito Reinī Burūzu (ミッドナイト・レイニー・ブルース))	Kan	HARRY	Kawamura
3.	"Diana Ross Medley: "Stop! In the Name of Love"; "You Keep Me Hangin' On"; "Love Child"; "	Holland–Dozier–Holland; R. Dean Taylor; Frank Wilson; Pam Sawyer; Deke Richards	Holland–Dozier–Holland; Taylor; Wilson; Richards	Tadakazu Onodera
4.	"F・L・T"	Jun Hashimoto	Kyōhei Tsutsumi	Akira Inoue

Side B

No.	Title	Lyrics	Music	Arrangement	Length
1.	"Come Back" (Kamu Bakku (カムバック))	Mayumi Shinozuka	HARRY	Kawmaura
2.	"Jealousy Holmes" (Jerashī Hōmuzu (ジェラシー・ホームズ))	Yoko Aki	Ryudo Uzaki	Mitsuo Hagita
3.	"Could I Have This Dance" (Anne Murray cover)	Wayland Holyfield; Bob House	Holyfield; House	Onodera
4.	"More More" (Moa Moa (モア・モア))	Aki	Uzaki	Makoto Kawaguchi
5.	"Slow Side Fast Side"	Hashimoto	Tsutsumi	Inoue

2007 CD bonus tracks

No.	Title	Lyrics	Music	Arrangement	Length
10.	"Shampoo" (Shanpū (シャンプー))	Yoshiko Miura	Kōji Tamaki	Kenji Omura
11.	"Heart in High"	Hiromi Mori	Tamaki	Omura

== See also ==
- 1982 in Japanese music
