= Days of Innocence – The Ultimate Collection =

Days Of Innocence - The Ultimate Collection

Compilation album by Moving Pictures
- Released: 2000
- Recorded: 1981–1984
- Genre: Rock
- Length: 1:18:16
- Label: BMG Records
- Producer: Executive producer of this compilation: Mark Rhodes

Moving Pictures chronology
| The Last Picture Show (Live) (1987) | Days Of Innocence - The Ultimate Collection (2000) | Picture This (2015) |

Professional ratings
Review scores
| Source | Rating |
|---|---|
| AllMusic | 4/5 stars |

Days Of Innocence - The Ultimate Collection is a compilation album by the Australian rock band Moving Pictures, released in 2000.

The compilation — the band's first greatest hits album — consists of the entire original 1981 album Days of Innocence, plus bonus tracks featuring the band's subsequent singles, as well as several tracks from the band's second album Matinee. The collection also features Moving Pictures' 1984 contribution to the Footloose soundtrack, "Never," written by lyricist Dean Pitchford and composer Michael Gore.

== Track listing ==
| No. | Title | Writer(s) | Album | Length |
|---|---|---|---|---|
| 1. | "Nothing to Do" | Alex Smith, Gary Frost | Days of Innocence (1981) | 3:29 |
| 2. | "The Angel and the Madman" | Smith, Frost, Charlie Cole | Days of Innocence (1981) | 4:34 |
| 3. | "Sweet Cherie" | Smith, Frost, Cole | Days of Innocence (1981) | 3:38 |
| 4. | "Round Again" | Smith, Frost | Days of Innocence (1981) | 4:03 |
| 5. | "Wings" | Smith | Days of Innocence (1981) | 4:47 |
| 6. | "What About Me" | Frost, Frances Swan Frost | Days of Innocence (1981) | 3:37 |
| 7. | "So Tired" | Smith | Days of Innocence (1981) | 3:49 |
| 8. | "Joni and Romeo" | Smith | Days of Innocence (1981) | 3:28 |
| 9. | "Bustin' Loose" | Smith | Days of Innocence (1981) | 4:21 |
| 10. | "Street Heart" | Smith, Frost, Cole, Ian Lees, Andrew Thompson, Paul Freeland | Days of Innocence (1981) | 7:06 |
| 11. | "Winners" | Frost | Non-album single (1982) | 3:45 |
| 12. | "Back to the Streets" | Smith | Matinée (1983) | 3:27 |
| 13. | "Where They Belong" | Frost | Matinée (1983) | 3:48 |
| 14. | "Never" | Dean Pitchford, Michael Gore | Footloose soundtrack (1984) | 3:48 |
| 15. | "Back to the Blues and Booze" | Smith | Matinée (1983) | 3:10 |
| 16. | "Saturday Love" | Smith, Frost | Non-album single B-side (1981) | 3:10 |
| 17. | "Spies" | Smith | | 4:29 |
| 18. | "Pleasure and Pain" | Smith, Cole | Matinée (1983) | 3:10 |
| 19. | "Sisters of Mercy" | Smith | Matinée (1983) | 5:27 |
| Total length: | | | | 78:16 |
