= Me Ing =

me ing

Studio album by Mie
- Released: 21 October 2007
- Genre: Pop rock
- Languages: Japanese; English
- Label: MHO
- Producer: Mitsuyo Nemoto

Mie chronology
Golden Best Mie: Hallelujah Hurricane (2002)	me ing (2007)

Singles from me ing
- 1. "SOAR ~Mada Minu Sora e~" Released: 25 October 2006

me ing (ミー・イング, Mī Ingu) is the fifth studio album by Japanese singer Mie. Released on October 21, 2007 through her own label MHO, the album marked Mie's first studio release since Diamond & Gold in 1992. me ing is also the first album to feature songs written by Mie herself. The album was reissued by Victor Entertainment on March 1, 2023.

== Track listing ==
No.	Title	Lyrics	Music	Arrangement	Length
1.	"virgin step I"		Mitsuyo Nemoto	Nemoto
2.	"aubade ~Yoake no Uta~" (Ōbādo ~Yoake no Uta (aubade～夜明けの詩～; "aubade ~Poetry of Dawn~"))	Nemoto	Yuriko Hoshi	Akira Inoue
3.	"Think of Me"	Nemoto; Kenji "Jino" Hino	Hino; Ippei Brown	Hino
4.	"Let It Snow on X'mas"	Nemoto	Hino; Brown	Hino
5.	"Voice of My Heart"	Nemoto; Yuriko Hoshi	Thomas G:son; Gerard James Borg	Gō "Fisher" Satō
6.	"Watashi no Mama ~ maybe it's a life" ((私のまま～maybe it’s a life; "Stay with Me ~ maybe it's a life"))	Hiromi Mori	G:son; Stefan Brunzell	Satō
7.	"SOAR ~Mada Minu Sora e~" (Soā ~Mada Minu Sora e~ (SOAR 〜まだ見ぬ空へ〜; Soar ~To the Unexplored Skies~))	Nemoto; Mori	Frankie T	Takuya Fuji
8.	"Arigatō no Hoshi" ((ありがとうの地球（ほし）; "Thank You World"))	Hiroshi Ichikura	Akira Inoue	Inoue
9.	"Chijō no Angel e" (Chijō no Enjeru e (地上のAngelへ; "The Angel on the Ground"))	Nemoto; Mori	G:son; Marcos Ubeda	Satō
10.	"Niji-iro no Yoake" ((虹いろの夜明け; "The Dawn of Rainbow Colors"))	Nemoto; Noritoshi Furuichi	JUNKOO; Takuya Harada	JUNKOO
11.	"Ningen Dakara" ((人間だから; "Because We're Human"))	Ichikura	Inoue	Inoue
12.	"virgin step II"		Nemoto	Nemoto
13.	"Eternal Gift"	Nemoto; Mori	Toshiya Shiori	Shiori
14.	"Alright Alright"	Nemoto	Harada	Harada
