= Kamihate Store =

2012 film

Kamihate Store (Japanese: カミハテ商店, Hepburn: Kamihate shōten) is a 2012 Japanese film directed by Tatsuya Yamamoto. It stars Keiko Takahashi, Susumu Terajima, Morio Agata, Ryushi Mizukami, Kento Fukaya, and Miho Hiraoka. The movie was featured at the Karlovy Vary International Film Festival in 2012.

== Synopsis ==
The story centers on a small store run by an old woman Chiyo (played by Keiko Takahashi) at the end of the bus line, in a village on an island in Japan. Visitors to the area frequently attempt suicide by jumping off a nearby cliff, and often visit her shop to purchase their last meal on the way there. Chiyo bakes bread for the people, fully knowing what they are about to do, and she herself has been affected personally by suicide. She collects the shoes of the dead, who remove them before they commit suicide. The story follows how she reacts to the people, and eventually the drama of how she changes over the winter that follows.
