= Fall Guy (1982 film) =

1982 film by Kinji Fukasaku

- Theatrical poster
- Directed by: Kinji Fukasaku
- Written by: Kôhei Tsuka
- Produced by: Haruki Kadokawa
- Starring: Keiko Matsuzaka; Morio Kazama; Mitsuru Hirata
- Cinematography: Kiyoshi Kitasaka
- Edited by: Isamu Ichida
- Music by: Masato Kai
- Production companies: Kadokawa Haruki Jimusho; Shochiku
- Distributed by: Shochiku
- Release date: October 9, 1982 (Japan)
- Running time: 109 minutes
- Country: Japan
- Language: Japanese
- Box office: ¥1.763 (~$7.3M USD)

Fall Guy (Japanese: 蒲田行進曲, Hepburn: Kamata Kōshin-kyoku; lit. 'Kamata March') is a 1982 Japanese film directed by Kinji Fukasaku, based on a play written and directed by Kōhei Tsuka, who also wrote the screenplay for the film.

Both the play and the film proved to be highly successful, garnering a number of awards, and variations of the play continues to be performed on stage today.

== Plot ==
Ginshiro Kuraoka, an actor for Toei, becomes jealous of the number of close-ups his co-star Tachibana is getting as they are filming a samurai film. After a fan named Tomoko has Ginshiro sign her inner thigh, Ginshiro sends his lackey Yasu Muraoka after her to obtain her phone number.

Ginshiro drowns his sorrows in alcohol, then Yasu brings him home, where the actress Konatsu is waiting for him. Konatsu is pregnant with Ginshiro's child and is unwilling to get an abortion for fear that she may not have another chance to have a child, so Ginshiro convinces Yasu to marry her. Yasu stamps the marriage certificate but Konatsu is disgusted with him for letting Ginshiro walk all over him. Yasu reveals a poster on his wall of her first film and says that he has been a fan for ten years. She tries to leave but collapses from toxemia. Yasu tells the doctors that he is the father of the unborn child.

Yasu begins taking on multiple stunt roles to pay for the expenses and sustains multiple injuries. When Tomoko seems like she might leave him, Ginshiro asks Konatsu to tell her how wonderful he is, which she does. Konatsu and Yasu find happiness but Tomoko does not take care of Ginshiro the way that Konatsu used to so he proposes to Konatsu with a 30-million-yen four-carat ring that he sold his house to buy. When she rejects him, he drives off set. Konatsu and Yasu get married.

When Ginshiro does not show up to film his scenes, Yasu finds him hiding in a warehouse. Ginshiro confesses that Tachibana took his place as the January model for a new model, that the film he was to shoot in the summer has been cancelled, and that he and Tomoko have broken up. Tachibana is gaining more screen time while Ginshiro's character is being killed off and his scenes are being cut, including his final fight scene on a giant 30-foot staircase because no stunt performer can be found who is willing to take the fall down it.

Yasu volunteers to take the fall down the staircase. He receives one million yen in hazard pay after signing a release to free the studio from liability, then takes out a 30-million-yen life insurance policy on himself. Konatsu asks him not to perform the stunt but he insists on it. After Yasu leaves to perform the stunt, Konatsu packs her things and leaves. Studio executives and theater owners visit to watch the stunt, so Yasu places a nail on the stairs and steps on it to see how everyone caters to him. When he demands that his cigarette must be lit by an expensive lighter, Ginshiro uses an expensive one to light it before slapping Yasu. Yasu thanks him profusely and says that he will work on his performance, so he postpones the stunt until after dinner. Yasu performs the stunt and is seriously injured but uses his remaining strength to crawl up the stairs again for a memorable death scene as Ginshiro cheers him on. Konatsu arrives in time to see the ambulance taking Yasu away.

Konatsu gives birth, then opens her eyes to see Yasu holding the baby. They agree to stay together as a family, then the director yells "Cut!" and the walls are pulled away to reveal the cast and crew of the film.

== Cast ==
- Keiko Matsuzaka as Konatsu
- Morio Kazama as Ginshiro
- Mitsuru Hirata as Yasu
- Chika Takami as Tomoko
- Daijiro Harada as Tachibana
- Keizo Kanie as Film Director
- Rei Okamoto as Toku-san
- Hyoei Enoki as Tome
- Nagare Hagiwara as Yuji
- Toshiya Sakai as Makoto
- Akihiro Shimizu
- Nijiko Kiyokawa as Yasu's mother
- Sonny Chiba as himself
- Hiroyuki Sanada as himself
- Etsuko Shihomi as herself
- Seizo Fukumoto
- Akira Shioji as Yamada

== Production ==
The property began as a play written and directed by Tsuka, premiering at Kinokuniya Hall in November 1980 with Akira Emoto in the Yasu role, and received the Kinokuniya Drama Award for 1980. Morio Kazama joined the company as Ginshiro in its second run in 1981, a role he would reprise in the film. The play continues to be performed around Japan including a version first adapted by Masaya Ishida for the Takarazuka Revue in 1996. A novelization of the play adapted by Tsuka and published by Kadokawa Shoten in 1981 would win the 86th Naoki Prize, when friends of Toru Okuyama, then managing director of Shochiku, brought the property to his attention.

As the Japanese title of the play, Kamata Kōshin-kyoku, references Shochiku's Kamata studio, Okuyama aggressively pursued acquiring the rights to the play, believing that if another studio did it, it would affect their reputation. Tsuka had given his book publisher Haruki Kadokawa's then fledgling film division first right of refusal as a creative producer due to interest in partnering with them on another project, but as they lacked the distribution network, agreed to partner with Shochiku as the lead exhibitor after their longtime partner Toei passed on participating. Toei had the largest stage in western Japan as well as was being the favored studio of Fukasaku, and eventually came aboard as a co-producer in providing their Kyoto Studios, where much of the "behind the scenes" locations were filmed, becoming one of the first films in which Toei, Shochiku, and what would become Daiei's future owner came together in a co-production partnership

Shochiku managed to leverage their interest in the casting of their contract player Matsuzaka in the Konatsu role, while Tsuka brought his stock players Kazama and Hirata in the Ginshiro and Yasu roles, all three of whom would go on to make several future films with Fukasaku. Toei's Kyoto Studio and its surrounding Uzumasa neighborhood became a character in itself, establishing itself as Japan's most iconic "backlot" location. The massive staircase set was built on Toei's stage 11, 8 metres (26 ft) high with 35 steps, and filmed with a close up of Hirata seen falling the first couple steps, then again with stunt double Kotaro Saruwatari doing the complete fall.

The rights to a further television version of the film was sold to TBS due to a budgetary shortfall during filming, which aired the following year in 1983. The broadcast was overshadowed by the suicide of Masaya Oki, who portrayed Ginshiro, the day before the airing of the 2nd part of the two part series.

== Reception ==
The film proved to be a huge success, winning a number of awards and grossing ¥1.76 billion yen (approximately $7.3 million U.S. dollars in 1983, $24M USD today).

Award	Date of ceremony	Category	Recipient(s)	Result	Ref.
4th Yokohama Film Festival	4 February 1983	Best Supporting Actor	Fall Guy - Mitsuru Hirata	Won	
4th Yokohama Film Festival	4 February 1983	Top 10 Films	Fall Guy	2	
25th Blue Ribbon Awards	9 February 1983	Best Film	Fall Guy	Won	
25th Blue Ribbon Awards	9 February 1983	Best Director	Kinji Fukasaku	Won	
56th Kinema Junpo	15 February 1983	Best Film	Fall Guy	Won	
56th Kinema Junpo	15 February 1983	Best Director	Kinji Fukasaku	Won	
56th Kinema Junpo	15 February 1983	Best Screenplay	Kōhei Tsuka	Won	
56th Kinema Junpo	15 February 1983	Best Actress	Keiko Matsuzaka	Won	
56th Kinema Junpo	15 February 1983	Best Supporting Actor	Mitsuru Hirata	Won	
56th Kinema Junpo	15 February 1983	Readers' Choice Best Film	Fall Guy	Won	
6th Japan Academy Film Prize	17 February 1983	Picture of the Year	Fall Guy	Won	
6th Japan Academy Film Prize	17 February 1983	Director of the Year	Kinji Fukasaku	Won	
6th Japan Academy Film Prize	17 February 1983	Screenplay of the Year	Kōhei Tsuka	Won	
6th Japan Academy Film Prize	17 February 1983	Best Actor	Mitsuru Hirata	Won	
6th Japan Academy Film Prize	17 February 1983	Best Actress	Keiko Matsuzaka	Won	
6th Japan Academy Film Prize	17 February 1983	Best Supporting Actor	Morio Kazama	Won	
37th Mainichi Film Awards	February 1983	Best Film	Fall Guy	Won	
37th Mainichi Film Awards	February 1983	Best Director	Kinji Fukasaku	Won	
37th Mainichi Film Awards	February 1983	Best Art Direction	Akira Takahashi	Won	
37th Mainichi Film Awards	February 1983	Best Actress	Keiko Matsuzaka	Won	
37th Mainichi Film Awards	February 1983	Readers' Choice	Fall Guy	Won	
7th Hochi Film Awards	December 1983	Best Film	Fall Guy	Won	
7th Hochi Film Awards	December 1983	Best Actor	Hirata Mitsuru	Won	

== Song ==
The title song, Kamata koshin-kyoku is based on "Song of the Vagabonds" from the 1925 operetta The Vagabond King by Rudolph Friml. It was released as a single by Shochiku Kamata studio, the film's studio. The song was originally performed by Yutaka Kawasaki and Naoko Soga. Matsuzaka, Kazama, and Hirata sing the film version.

== Postage stamp ==
An 80-yen Japanese commemorative postage stamp featuring an image from the film was issued on October 10, 2006.

== Bibliography ==
- Kamata koshin-kyoku (1982) at IMDb
- 蒲田行進曲 (in Japanese). Japanese Movie Database.
- "KAMATA KOSHINKYOKU". The Complete Index to World Film.
- 蒲田行進曲 (in Japanese). www.walkerplus.com. Archived from the original on 2005-01-23.
- Behling, John (2005-04-12). "Fall Guy". www.midnighteye.com.
- 蒲田行進曲 (in Japanese). www.cinelier.jp. Archived from the original on April 5, 2009.
- "Variety Japan" 蒲田行進曲 (in Japanese). Variety Japan.
