= Hot Rod (2007 film) =

2007 film by Akiva Schaffer

- Theatrical release poster
- Directed by: Akiva Schaffer
- Written by: Pam Brady
- Produced by: John Goldwyn; Lorne Michaels
- Starring: Andy Samberg; Isla Fisher; Jorma Taccone; Bill Hader; Danny McBride; Will Arnett; Sissy Spacek; Ian McShane
- Cinematography: Andrew Dunn
- Edited by: Malcolm Campbell
- Music by: Trevor Rabin
- Production companies: Michaels/Goldwyn; Broadway Video; The Lonely Island
- Distributed by: Paramount Pictures
- Release date: August 3, 2007 (United States)
- Running time: 88 minutes
- Country: United States
- Language: English
- Budget: $25 million
- Box office: $14.4 million

Hot Rod is a 2007 American comedy film directed by Akiva Schaffer (in his directorial debut) and written by Pam Brady. The film stars Andy Samberg (in his film debut) as amateur accident-prone stuntman Rod Kimble, whose stepfather, Frank (Ian McShane), continuously mocks and disrespects him. When Frank becomes ill, Rod raises money for his heart operation by executing his largest stunt yet. The film also stars Jorma Taccone, Sissy Spacek, Will Arnett, Danny McBride, Isla Fisher and Bill Hader.

The film was initially drafted by Pam Brady (who retains full writing credit) as a vehicle for Saturday Night Live star Will Ferrell, but the project never commenced. Lorne Michaels convinced Paramount to let The Lonely Island, which was gaining fame for its work on SNL, take over the film. The group subsequently rewrote the movie with a heavy emphasis on offbeat surreal humor. Seth Meyers contributed in this rewriting process. It was shot in Vancouver in the summer of 2006. The score is by former Yes guitarist Trevor Rabin, and the soundtrack features several songs by the Swedish rock band Europe.

Paramount Pictures released Hot Rod on August 3, 2007. It was a box-office failure, grossing only $14 million on a $25 million budget. As its producers predicted, the film received mixed reviews, with criticism towards its script and humor. Since its release, Hot Rod has become a cult film.

== Plot ==
Throughout his life, Rod Kimble has believed his dead father was a successful and respectable stuntman working for Evel Knievel. He aspires to follow in his father's footsteps and become a famous stuntman himself. Meanwhile, his stepfather Frank does not respect Rod as a man, often going out of his way to beat him in sparring sessions, mocking his stuntman dreams.

Rod makes many attempts to land jumps with his Tomos moped, most of them unsuccessful. After another failed jump attempt at a public pool, he returns home and learns that Frank is in urgent need of a heart transplant, which the family's health insurance will not cover. Rod is angered that he could die without getting a chance to gain his respect.

Rod runs into the woods to let out his fury and tumbles down a steep hill, where he sees an inspirational billboard so becomes inspired. He quickly meets with his childhood friends Rico and Dave and his half-brother Kevin, telling them he plans to jump over 15 school buses and use the proceeds to fund Frank's surgery. Later, Denise, his neighbor and love interest, joins his team.

To promote his stunt and raise funds, Rod works parties, corporate get-togethers, and other events, performing activities such as taping pillows to his body and having a washing machine suspended by a crane swing to hit him. One day, he gets curious about what Kevin is working on as he hears music coming from his computer. Kevin says he was experimenting with editing footage, and shows Rod the video.

Impressed by Kevin's work, Rod gets the idea to release a stuntman film to raise money. Kevin releases the movie using his footage of Rod's stunts and sells many tickets to the screening, where the audience laughs at Rod as the film depicts his failed training attempts.

Rod gets angry and throws the theater's projector out of a window, smashing the projectionist's car below. He has to give the projectionist everything he has raised to cover the damages and avoid arrest. Upset, Rod returns home, where his mother reveals that his biological father was not the stuntman he thought he was.

Humiliated, Rod quits the team and his dream to beat Frank, despite his friends' objections, but is reinvigorated when Dave gives him advice that inspires him to apologize to Kevin. As Kevin accepts his apology, he reveals that Rod's stunt footage has grown popular online and that a show on a local AM radio station, hosted by Barry Pasternak, has offered to cover the planned jump's expenses.

Rod gets his friends back together, and they start setting up for the jump. On the day of the event, his friends give him a new suit, a rock representing Rico's extensive pyrotechnic work, and a powerful motorbike. He also receives a kiss from Denise, who broke up with Jonathan, her insensitive and callous boyfriend.

As Rod jumps off the ramp, his bike's speed enables him to jump over the buses, but the motorcycle smashes through a stage and goes flying. Rod lands squarely on the ground and has an unconscious out-of-body experience. When he wakes, Rod, with Kevin and Denise's help, triumphantly gets up to applause and sees that the donations have accumulated over $50,000.

Six months later, Rod once again spars with Frank, finally gaining the upper hand and Frank's respect. After the credits, Rod is seen bowing down to his moped with the sunset in the background.

== Cast ==
- Andy Samberg as Rod Kimble
- Jorma Taccone as Kevin Powell
- Bill Hader as Dave McLean
- Danny McBride as Rico Brown
- Isla Fisher as Denise Harris
- Sissy Spacek as Marie Powell
- Ian McShane as Frank Powell
- Will Arnett as Jonathan Ault
- Chris Parnell as Barry Pasternak
- Chester Tam as Richardson
- Mark Acheson as Homeless Dude
- Alvin Sanders as Furious Boss
- Akiva Schaffer as Derek
- Britt Irvin as Cathy Fay
- Brittany Tiplady as Maggie McLean
- Andrew Moxham as Sullivan Tom
- Queens of the Stone Age as Gown

== Production ==
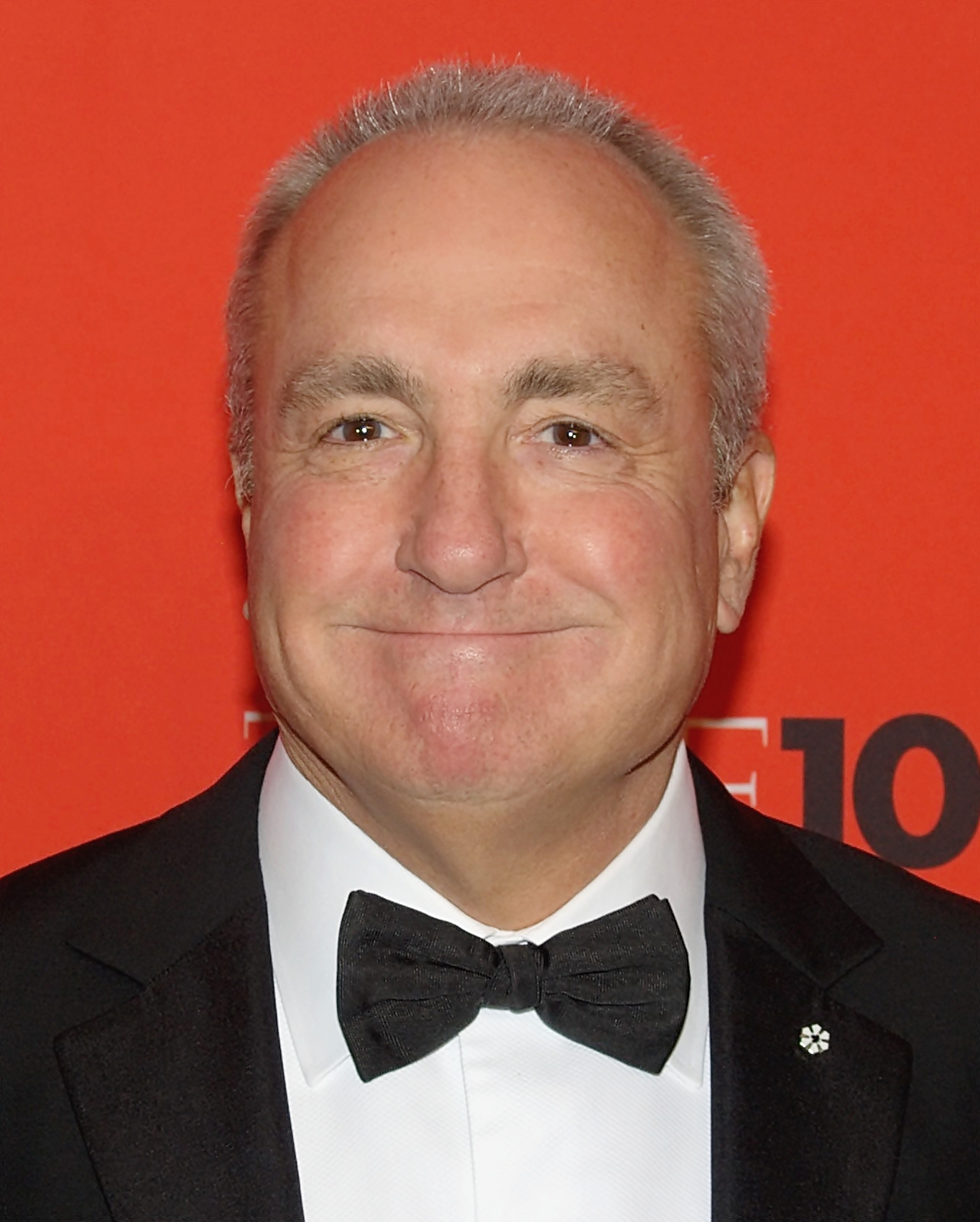
SNL executive producer Lorne Michaels was key in giving the Lonely Island creative control of the film.

Hot Rod was written by Pam Brady, a former South Park writer, as a project for Will Ferrell during his tenure at Saturday Night Live. The project never commenced, and the script remained in limbo at Paramount Pictures for several years. In the meantime, The Lonely Island was hired at SNL in 2005, and by the end of the year, it had a breakthrough with its short "Lazy Sunday." The sketch, an "SNL Digital Short," received millions of views online (especially on the then-fledgling YouTube), making the trio, especially Samberg, stars. Lorne Michaels, SNL's creator, convinced Paramount to allow the troupe to direct and star in the film. The trio had no prior experience with feature-length films, but Michaels had confidence, envisioning the film as a "different generation's comedy." The studio wanted the film to remain less coarse to obtain a PG-13 rating from the Motion Picture Association of America (MPAA), like DodgeBall: A True Underdog Story (2004).

Initially reluctant, as the script was designed for Ferrell and the summer filming schedule was less than ideal, Paramount authorized a rewrite, allowing the writers to incorporate bizarre, offbeat humor and absurdist comedy. The script had to "match their standards"—"another way of saying, 'just dumb it down'", said Schaffer. This involved deleting comedy designed for Ferrell (which Samberg called "so well-written") and replacing it with their own. "We didn't want it to seem like I was doing a Ferrell impression," said Samberg. The result was a balance between "weird" humor and what Paramount considered accessible. Samberg was inspired by Wet Hot American Summer, which was, according to him, "designed to fuck around with what's expected from a movie." Many jokes from the film deemed "too weird" were cut, including a scene in which Rod "jokingly," asks his younger brother Kevin to pull out his genitalia. Samberg aimed for a performance that was:

Bad, but you know it's bad... There's a lot said about how this is the nerdy generation, and it's Internet-driven. The comedy that's influenced me has always been that. From the Three Stooges through Steve Martin in The Jerk and Ace Ventura and Chris Farley and Billy Madison, they were village idiots. That's definitely the tradition we're trying to follow.

Hot Rod was largely filmed in Vancouver in the summer of 2006. Shooting locations include Cloverdale, British Columbia, and under the Surrey end of the Pattullo Bridge southeast of Vancouver. Other locations in British Columbia include Coquitlam, North Vancouver, Burnaby and Downtown Vancouver. Samberg had a stunt double, but did as many of his own stunts as was allowed.

The MPAA objected to using the word "semen" in a scene in which Chris Parnell reveals a profane tattoo on his stomach. It was changed to "residue." Another scene that barely made it into the film involved Samberg and Taccone repeating the phrase "cool beans" until it evolves into a "bizarre pseudo-rap." Schaffer initially cut the scene, but Samberg and Taccone edited it themselves. Schaffer reinserted the scene in the film's last test screening, where it received high marks from audiences as one of their favorite bits. The film's original poster featured a silhouetted Samberg atop a hill beside his motorbike in a martial-arts pose. Paramount changed the poster to a large close-up of Samberg's face.

== Reception ==
Before its release, the Lonely Island promoted the film with interstitials during Comedy Central movie marathons. In the promos, the trio attempt to convince viewers that Hot Rod is the story of a sex offender ("He does stunts to raise money to sex-offend") and spoof the quality of films run during daytime marathons ("Stay tuned for Teen Wolf Too!"). The premiere was at the John Ford Amphitheatre in Los Angeles.

Samberg predicted that critics would not like the film, telling Entertainment Weekly: "It will get bad reviews. Comedy is traditionally not reviewed that well." He added that if future generations viewed Hot Rod with a similar reverence to films such as Billy Madison, he would consider it a success.

The "punchdance" term the film introduced was a reference to the movie Footloose.

=== Commercial performance ===
The film opened at #9 at the U.S. box office in 2007 and grossed $5.3 million in its opening weekend. Overall, it bombed in theaters, leaving after 68 days, grossing just under $14 million.

=== Critical reception ===
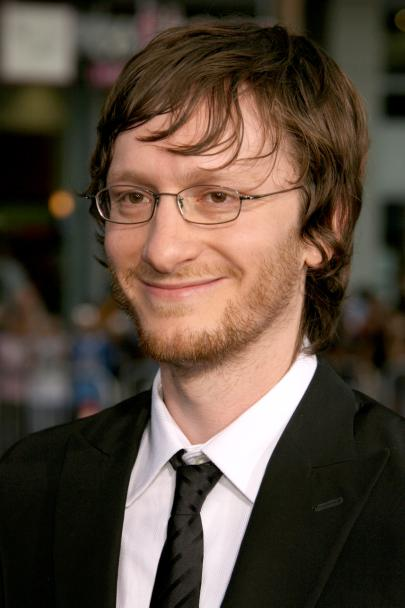
Akiva Schaffer at the film's premiere. His directorial style was criticized in reviews.

Hot Rod received mixed reviews from film critics upon its initial release. On Metacritic, it has an average score of 43 out of 100, based on 27 reviews, indicating "mixed or average" reviews. On Rotten Tomatoes, it has a score of 39% from 118 reviews, with an average rating of 5.10/10. The site's consensus reads "Hot Rod has brazen silliness and a few humorous set pieces on its side, but it's far too inconsistent to satisfy all but the least demanding slapstick lovers." After its release, Paper wrote, "Depending on whom you talk to, Hot Rod is either a terrible stinker or a really strange and wonderful movie that you can't believe they got away with making." Audiences polled by CinemaScore gave the film an average grade of B− on an A+ to F scale.

The Hollywood Reporter's Frank Scheck criticized the film's "formulaic" script and humor, but commended Samberg's "reasonably engaging and sweet comedic screen presence." "No one seems to have told the Lonely Island boys that the stakes are a little higher in features than they are in music videos and that underlighted shots and sloppy editing are more distracting on the big screen than on television," wrote Marjorie Baumgarten of The Austin Chronicle. Wesley Morris of The Boston Globe called the film "playfully dumb," commenting, "The filmmakers [...] have skipped right past the kitsch of tribute and gone straight for jokey delusion [...] And in that sense, Hot Rod is post-parody, taking nothing seriously, not even being a movie." Peter Travers of Rolling Stone wrote, "The film's low-key Wayne's World vibe takes it only so far. I laughed, then I wished it was funnier, then I just wished it would end. Peter Debruge of Variety called the movie "yet another example of a comedy that refuses to be taken seriously—concept as clothesline for all manner of silliness." Nick Schager of Slant Magazine noted that the trio "care far less about clever plotting than random ridiculousness," deeming the film "a tired rehash of every SNL alum's big-screen debut since Adam Sandler's Billy Madison."

For their part, the film's producers remained optimistic about the movie in the press. "The movies I've always liked, comedy-wise—Billy Madison, The Jerk—always got terrible reviews. When our reviews came in, it was like, 'Oh, we're right on track,'" said Samberg.

Lorne Michaels predicted it would find a different audience in the future:

I've lived through everything from Wayne's World with Mike [Myers] and Dana [Carvey] to Tommy Boy with Chris Farley, all the things I did with [Will] Ferrell, and even Three Amigos. Critics just don't like new comedians, and they certainly don't like them if they come from SNL or television. Later on, they revise their opinions and say that so-and-so's later films aren't as good as the first ones. I think the picture will be thought of differently in two years.

Chicago Sun-Times critic Roger Ebert gave the film three out of four stars:

The movie is funny because it is sincere. It likes Rod. It doesn't portray him as a maniacal goofball, but as an ambitious kid who really thinks, every single time, that he will succeed. In creating this aura of sincerity, Hot Rod benefits from Spacek's performance—she plays the mom absolutely straight, without inflection, as if she were not in a comedy. That's the only right choice—supporting characters are needed to reinforce Rod, not compete with him.

The A.V. Club later wrote that the film differentiated itself from other Michaels comedies: "They may be just as poorly received, but their rhythms are unpredictable and exciting, shocked to life by moments of anti-comedy and wacky deconstruction. Hardcore comedy devotees pick up on them like a dog whistle."

== Home media ==
Hot Rod was released on DVD and HD DVD on November 27, 2007, and on Blu-ray on December 16, 2008.

== Soundtrack ==
Hot Rod

Soundtrack album by Various
- Released: July 31, 2007
- Genre: Soundtrack
- Label: Sony Legacy

Professional ratings
Review scores
| Source | Rating |
|---|---|
| Allmusic | 3/5 stars |

The soundtrack was composed by ex-Yes guitarist Trevor Rabin. Several songs by the Swedish rock band Europe are in the movie, including "Cherokee" and "Rock the Night." The trailer contains three Swedish rock songs, Europe's "Cherokee" and "The Final Countdown", and The Hives' "See Through Head". It also includes the UK rock band Test Icicles' "Circle. Square. Triangle" as well as American Hi-Fi's "The Art of Losing." The band called Gown that plays at Rod's final jump is actually Queens of the Stone Age.

Track listing

1. "Danger on the Track" – Europe
2. "A Gringo Like Me" – Ennio Morricone
3. "Never" – Moving Pictures
4. "Two of Hearts" – Stacey Q
5. "Cherokee" – Europe
6. "Skulls" – The Nutley Brass (Written by Glenn Danzig)
7. "Street Luge" – Trevor Rabin
8. "You're the Voice" – John Farnham
9. "Head Honcho" – Gown
10. "Chase" – Giorgio Moroder
11. "Cool Beans" – Jorma Taccone & Andy Samberg
12. "(I Just) Died in Your Arms" – Cutting Crew
13. "Dave on Acid" – Trevor Rabin
14. "Rock the Night" – Europe
15. "Stunt Suite" – Trevor Rabin
16. "Time Has Come" – Europe
17. "The Real Bass" – Brooklyn Bounce
