= Punchdance =

Punchdance (also stylized punch dance and punch-dance) refers to a form of street dance involving punching in the form of shadowboxing as well as other combat maneuvers to a rhythm.

Notable performances in film include Kevin Bacon's, as Ren McCormack, in 1984's Footloose, and the parody of it performed by Andy Samberg, as Rod Kimble, in 2007's Hot Rod. Both performances were accompanied by the same song, "Never," by Moving Pictures, written by Michael Gore and Dean Pitchford. Hot Rod also included a performance accompanied by Two of Hearts by Stacey Q. Hot Rod's use of the term by its protagonist was followed by popular usage.

== See also ==
- Tricking (acrobatics)
- Breakdance
- Capoeira
- Parkour
