= Door (film) =

1988 Japanese horror film

- Film cover
- Directed by: Banmei Takahashi
- Written by: Ataru Oikawa; Banmei Takahashi
- Produced by: Kosuke Kuri
- Starring: Keiko Takahashi; Daijiro Tsutsumi; Shirō Shimomoto; Takuto Yonezu
- Cinematography: Yasushi Sasakibara
- Edited by: Jun'ichi Kikuchi
- Music by: Gouji Tsuno
- Distributed by: Arrow Films
- Release date: 14 May 1988 (Japan)
- Running time: 94 minutes
- Country: Japan
- Language: Japanese

Door (Japanese: ドア, Hepburn: Doa) is a 1988 Japanese horror thriller film directed by Banmei Takahashi and written by Takahashi and Ataru Oikawa. It stars Keiko Takahashi, Daijiro Tsutsumi, Shirō Shimomoto and Takuto Yonezu. The film follows a housewife and her young son who are stalked by a psychopathic door-to-door salesman.

A sequel was released in 1991, which was again directed by Banmei Takahashi but features different characters. Another sequel, directed by Kiyoshi Kurosawa, came out in 1996.

== Plot ==
Yasuko Honda is a housewife living in a high-rise apartment building with her husband Satoru and son Takuto. Yasuko accompanies her son to the bus station before taking out the trash. When she returns to the apartment, the bag of trash is on her doorstep again. Later, she receives two telemarketing calls.

The next day, her husband leaves for work. A salesman rings the doorbell, interrupting Yasuko during a phone call with a friend. When he tries to pass a pamphlet through the door, she slams it shut, crushing his fingers. He tries to persuade her to let him in, but she refuses and he eventually leaves. He later comes back and unsuccessfully tries to kick in the door. An old woman next door sees what is happening, but does not intervene.

Yasuko starts to get abusive phone calls from the salesman, whose voice she recognizes, and the message "I'm sexually frustrated, can someone please do it with me" is written on her door. She also finds a sperm-soaked tissue paper in the mail. She attempts to file a report with the police, but is rebuffed due to not knowing the salesman's name or appearance.

Satoru does not return from work that night. In one call to Yasuko, the salesman mentions Takuto in a threatening manner. She races to the kindergarten, but he is unhurt; the salesman watches the scene without them noticing. Yasuko and her son go home together and he soon disappears from the apartment. While Yasuko searches the building for him, the salesman enters the unlocked apartment and hides. Yasuko calls a friend and learns that her son is at her place. The salesman appears and threatens Yasuko with a knife. Takuto returns home from his visit and Yasuko asks the salesman to pretend to be a guest, which he does.

The salesman is friendly towards Takuto and they play together while Yasuko prepares dinner. Yasuko warns the salesman that her husband might return, but he replies that he does not care what happens to him. During dinner, Yasuko hits him from behind with a bottle and they fight before Yasuko and Takuto retreat to the bathroom. The salesman cuts into the locked door with a chainsaw, but is stabbed in the face and his hand is bludgeoned. Yasuko believes that they are safe and brings her son to bed. However, the salesman hid in a closet, and after another fight, Yasuko cuts his throat with the chainsaw. The film ends with Yasuko sitting on the floor while another telemarketer calls her.

== Cast ==
- Keiko Takahashi as Yasuko Honda, the housewives
- Daijiro Tsutsumi as Yamakawa / the Salesman
- Shirō Shimomoto as Satoru Honda, Yasuka's business husband
- Takuto Yonezu as Takuto Honda, Yasuko and Satoru's son
- Masao Ishida as the Man Next Door
- Yoshihiro Shimada as the Delivery Man
- Hiroshi Noguchi as the Policeman

== Release ==
The film was initially only released in Japan. It was remastered and shown at several film festivals, including the Tokyo International Film Festival, in 2022. It has also been released on Blu-ray by Arrow Films and on various streaming services.

== Reception ==
Newer reviews of the film are generally positive. In HorrorPress, the film was called a "diamond in the rough.". A review in Filmhounds describes it as a "claustrophobic thriller that feels as relevant today as it did more than 40 years ago."

== See also ==
- Cinema of Japan
- Japanese horror
- List of films featuring home invasions
