= I My Mie =

"I MY MIE"

Studio album by MIE
- Released: 21 August 1981
- Recorded: 1981
- Genre: Pop rock
- Language: Japanese
- Label: Victor

MIE chronology
"I MY MIE" (1981)	MIE Live (1981)

Singles from I MY MIE
- 1. "Brahms Loves Rock" Released: 25 July 1981

"I MY MIE" is the debut album of Japanese singer MIE. The album was released on August 21, 1981, less than five months after the dissolution of her group Pink Lady. It was reissued on October 24, 2007 as "I MY MIE +1", with one bonus track.

== Track listing ==
All lyrics by Yoko Aki, music by Ryudo Uzaki. All arrangement by Mitsuo Hagita except where indicated.

Side A

No.	Title	Length
1.	"Maihime TONIGHT" (Maihime Tunaito (舞姫 TONIGHT, "Dancer Tonight"))
2.	"Kare to Watashi to On'na Tomodachi" ((彼と私と女友達, "He and I and a Girl Friend"))
3.	"Tahiti Mediterranean Club" (Tahichi Chichūkai Kurabu (タヒチ地中海クラブ))
4.	"Don't Call Me, Mr. X"
5.	"Sekaijū no.... ni Kataomoi" ((世界中の・・・・に片想い, "Unrequited Love in the World"))

Side B

No.	Title	Length
1.	"Animal House" (Animaru Hausu (アニマルハウス))
2.	"Brahms Loves Rock" (Burāmusu wa Rokku ga o Suki (ブラームスはロックがお好き))
3.	"I MY MIE" (Ai Mai Mī (曖 昧 MIE, "Ambiguous MIE"))
4.	"Shinju Dorobō" ((真珠泥棒, "Pearl Thief"))
5.	"Today's My Birthday"
6.	"After Five Friday"
7.	"Bōeki Fū" ((貿易風, "Trade Winds"))

2007 CD bonus track

No.	Title	Arrangement	Length
13.	"More More" (Moa Moa (モア・モア))	Makoto Kawaguchi

== See also ==
- 1981 in Japanese music
