= Girl Mistress =

1980 film by Banmei Takahashi

- Theatrical poster
- Directed by: Banmei Takahashi
- Written by: Kei Ōnuki
- Produced by: Teruhiko Yada
- Starring: Cecile Gōda; Satoshi Miyata; Shirō Shimomoto
- Cinematography: Yūichi Nagata
- Edited by: Teruo Nakajima
- Music by: Rōman Kikaku
- Production companies: Kokuei; Takahashi Productions
- Distributed by: Shintōhō Eiga
- Release date: October 1, 1980 (Japan)
- Running time: 60 minutes
- Country: Japan
- Language: Japanese

Girl Mistress (Japanese: 少女情婦, Hepburn: Shōjo Jōfu) is a 1980 Japanese pink film directed by Banmei Takahashi.

== Synopsis ==
An older yakuza man falls in love with Seru, a high school girl. When he is put in prison, Seru begins working as a prostitute to earn money for the gangster's parole. During her yakuza lover's incarceration, Seru gains a new, young boyfriend. The yakuza discovers the new boyfriend after he is released from prison. Realizing that she will have a better life with her new boyfriend who is not associated with the yakuza, he sacrifices his love for Seru and gives her up.

== Cast ==
- Cecile Gōda (豪田路世留) as Seru
- Satoshi Miyata (宮田諭) as Seru's younger boyfriend
- Shirō Shimomoto (下元史郎) as yakuza in love with Seru
- Naomi Oka (丘なおみ)
- Maria Satsuki (五月マリア)
- Ren Osugi (大杉漣)

== Production ==
Along with Mamoru Watanabe and Genji Nakamura, Banmei Takahashi was known as one of the "Three Pillars of Pink" before he made Girl Mistress. He was known for his stylistically unique approach to the genre which brought college students back to pink film theaters at this time, when Nikkatsu's Roman Porno series was beginning to lose its popularity among this audience.

== Reception ==
In their Japanese Cinema Encyclopedia: The Sex Films, Thomas and Yuko Mihara Weisser give Girl Mistress three-and-a-half out of four stars. Director Takahashi had already made a name for himself in the pink film through his films at Kōji Wakamatsu's production company, such as Raping the Sisters (1977) and Japanese Inquisition (1978), and films made at his own company, such as Attacking Girls and Scandal: Pleasure Trap (both 1979). However, according to the Weissers, Girl Mistress is the film which cemented his name in the history of pink cinema.

== Release ==
Banmei Takahashi filmed Girl Mistress for his own Takahashi Productions and Kokuei and it was released theatrically in Japan by Shintōhō Eiga in October 1980. Uplink released it on DVD as part of their Nippon Erotics series on June 28, 2002.

== Bibliography ==
=== English ===
- "SHOUJO JOUFU". Complete Index to World Film.
- Weisser, Thomas; Yuko Mihara Weisser (1998). Japanese Cinema Encyclopedia: The Sex Films. Miami: Vital Books : Asian Cult Cinema Publications. pp. 183–184. ISBN 1-889288-52-7.

=== Japanese ===
- 少女情婦(1980) (in Japanese). allcinema.net.
- 少女情婦 (in Japanese). Japanese Movie Database.
- 少女情婦 (in Japanese). Japanese Cinema Database (Agency for Cultural Affairs).
