= Mie Live =

MIE Live

Live album by MIE
- Released: 21 February 1982
- Recorded: 3 October 1981
- Venue: Shibuya Public Hall
- Genre: Pop rock
- Language: Japanese; English
- Label: Victor

MIE chronology
I MY MIE (1981)	MIE Live (1982)	Call Girl "from MIE to you" (1982)

MIE Live is a live album Japanese singer MIE. Recorded live at Shibuya Public Hall on October 3, 1981, the album was released on February 21, 1982. MIE Live features cover songs and a medley of Pink Lady hit singles and B-sides. The album was reissued on October 24, 2007 as MIE Live +2, with two bonus tracks.

== Track listing ==
Side A

No.	Title	Writer(s)	Length
1.	"Hearts" (Marty Balin cover)	Jesse Barish	4:03
2.	"Stand by Me" (Ben E. King cover)	Ben E. King; Jerry Leiber and Mike Stoller	3:38
3.	"Call Me" (Blondie song)	Debbie Harry; Giorgio Moroder	5:46
4.	"I Can't Turn You Loose" (Otis Redding cover)	Otis Redding	3:59
5.	"It Must Be Him" (Vikki Carr cover)	Gilbert Bécaud; Maurice Vidalin; Mack David	5:38

Side B

All lyrics are written by Yū Aku, except where indicated; all music is composed by Shunichi Tokura, except where indicated

Shocking Pink Lady
No.	Title	Lyrics	Music	Length
1.	"Shocking Pink Lady Theme" (Shokkingu Pink Redī no Tēma (SHOCKING PINK LADYのテーマ))
2.	"Pepper Keibu" (Peppā Keibu (ペッパー警部, "Inspector Pepper"))
3.	"Kanpai Ojōsan" ((乾杯お嬢さん, "Cheers, Miss"))
4.	"Pink no Ringo" (Pinku no Ringo (ピンクの林檎, "Pink Apple"))
5.	"Ai Giri Giri" ((愛・GIRI GIRI, "Last Minute Love"))	Yūichirō Oda	Shizuka Ijūin
6.	"Monday Mona Lisa Club" (Mandē Mona Riza Kurabu (マンデー・モナリザ・クラブ))
7.	"Carmen '77" (Karumen Nanajū-nana (カルメン '77))
8.	"Tōmei Ningen" ((透明人間, "Invisible Person"))
9.	"Super Monkey Son Goku" (Sūpā Monkī Son Gokū (スーパー・モンキー孫悟空))
10.	"S.O.S."
11.	"Pink Typhoon (In the Navy)" (Pinku Taifūn (In za Nebī) (ピンク・タイフーン（In the Navy）))	Tomoko Okada	Jacques Morali; Henri Belolo; Victor Willis
12.	"Remember (Fame)" (Rimenbā (Fēmu) (リメンバー (フェーム)))	Rei Nakanishi	Michael Gore; Dean Pitchford
13.	"Utakata" ((うたかた, "Bubble"))	Yoshiko Miura	Michael Lloyd
14.	"Kiss in the Dark"	Lloyd	Lloyd
15.	"Shocking Pink Lady Theme 2"
16.	"UFO"
17.	"Chameleon Army" (Kamereon Āmī (カメレオン・アーミー))
18.	"Nami Nori Pirates" (Nami Nori Pairētsu (波乗りパイレーツ, "Surfing Pirates"))
19.	"Southpaw" (Sausupō (サウスポー))
20.	"Zipangu" (Jipangu (ジパング))
21.	"Hoshi kara Kita Futari" ((星から来た二人, "Two People from the Stars"))
22.	"Nagisa no Sindbad" (Nagisa no Shindobaddo (渚のシンドバッド, "Sindbad of the Beach"))
23.	"Wanted (Shimei Tehai)" (Uonteddo (Shimei Tehai) (ウォンテッド（指名手配）, "Wanted (Fugitive Warrant)"))
24.	"Shocking Pink Lady Theme 3"
Total length:				21:47

2007 CD bonus tracks

No.	Title	Lyrics	Music	Arrangement	Length
1.	"Madobe Kara" ((窓辺から, "From the Window Side"))	Etsuko Kisugi	Kōji Tamaki	Mitsuo Hagita
2.	"Odoru Onna" ((踊る女, "Dancing Woman"))	Akira Ootsu	Tamaki	Hagita

== See also ==
- 1982 in Japanese music
