= Kōhei Tsuka =

- Born: Kim Pongung (김봉웅); April 24, 1948; Kama, Fukuoka, Japan
- Died: July 10, 2010 (aged 62); Kamogawa, Chiba Prefecture, Japan
- Education: Keio University
- Occupations: Playwright; theater director; screenwriter
- Writing career
- Notable work: The Atami Murder Case

Kōhei Tsuka (つか こうへい, Tsuka Kōhei; 24 April 1948 – 10 July 2010) was a Korean-Japanese playwright, theater director, and screenwriter. He was one of Japan's most influential theater figures, to the extent that recent Japanese theatrical history has been divided into pre-Tsuka and post-Tsuka periods.

He died of lung cancer in Kamogawa, Chiba Prefecture at age 62.

== Early life ==
Tsuka was a second-generation Korean-Japanese whose experience as a member of a minority informed his work. His pen name is derived from "itsuka kohei", meaning "equal someday." Tsuka started his theater career with "A Red Beret for You" as a student at Keio University.

== Career ==
In 1974, Tsuka started his own group, Tsuka Kōhei Jimusho, a part of the second generation of modern Japanese theater. He focused less on text, often improvising based on the written play, and used the everyday language of the youth. The sets of his plays were minimal, with the stage almost empty. His system, called jikogekika, compels actors to put themselves and their ideas on stage, with little concern for society as a whole.

Tsuka took a break from the stage from November 1982 to February 1989.

== Selected works ==
- 1970 Yūbinya-san chotto (郵便屋さんちょっと)
- 1971 Sensō de shinenakatta otōsan no tame ni (戦争で死ねなかったお父さんのために)
- 1972 Shokyū kakumei kōza hiryūden (初級革命講座飛龍伝)
- 1973 Atami satsujin jiken (熱海殺人事件, The Atami Murder Case)
- 1980 Sutorippā monogatari (ストリッパー物語)
- 1981 Kamata kōshinkyoku (蒲田行進曲)
- 1982 Bara Hoteru (薔薇ホテル)
- 1982 Tsuka-ban Chūshingura (つか版・忠臣蔵)
- 1983 Seishun kakeochiban (青春かけおち篇)
- 1987 Kyōko (今日子)

== Awards ==
- Kunio Kishida Drama Prize for "The Atami Murder Case" (1974)
- 86th Naoki Literary Prize for the film Fall Guy (1981)
- Japan Academy Prize for Screenplay of the Year for the film Fall Guy (1983)
