= Mitsuru Hirata =

Japanese actor

- Born: November 2, 1953 (age 72); Aichi, Japan
- Occupation: Actor
- Years active: 1981–present

Mitsuru Hirata (平田満, Hirata Mitsuru) is a Japanese actor. He won the award for best actor at the 7th Hochi Film Award and the award for best supporting actor at the 4th Yokohama Film Festival for Fall Guy.

== Filmography ==
=== Film ===
- Fall Guy (1982), Yasu
- The Gate of Youth: Part 2 (1982), Masakazu Kawachi
- Izakaya Chōji (1983), Ochi
- Theater of Life (1983), Yasuta Yokoi
- Time and Tide (1983)
- Shanghai Rhapsody (1984), Shinzō Hirota
- Final Take (1986)
- Rex: A Dinosaur's Story (1993)
- Love & Pop (1998)
- First Love (2000)
- My Grandpa (2003)
- The Man in White (2003)
- The Ode to Joy (2006)
- Southbound (2007)
- Amalfi: Rewards of the Goddess (2009)
- The Lone Scalpel (2010)
- Rebirth (2011)
- The Woodsman and the Rain (2011)
- Angel Home (2013)
- The Mourner (2015)
- Gukoroku: Traces of Sin (2017)
- And Then There Was Light (2017)
- Memoirs of a Murderer (2017)
- We Are (2018)
- 5 Million Dollar Life (2019)
- Listen to the Universe (2019)
- Fukushima 50 (2020)
- The Asadas (2020)
- Dreaming of the Meridian Arc (2022)
- Call Me Chihiro (2023), Bitō
- The Women in the Lakes (2024)
- Traveling Alone (2025)
- Under Ninja (2025), Principal
- Showtime 7 (2025)
- Euthanasia Special Zone (2026)

=== Television ===
- Bakumatsu Seishun Graffiti: Fukuzawa Yukichi (1985), John Manjirō
- Dokuganryū Masamune (1987), Suzuki Motonobu
- Journey Under the Midnight Sun (2006)
- Barefoot Gen (2007)
- SP (2007–2008)
- Last Friends (2008)
- Mori no Asagao (2010)
- Hana Moyu (2015), Dr. Yamane Bunki
- Shingari (2015)
- Midnight Diner: Tokyo Stories (2016)
- Kenji Miyazawa's Table (2017), Masajirō Miyazawa
- Segodon (2018), Ōkubo Jiemon
- Showa Genroku Rakugo Shinju (2018), Yūrakutei Yakumo VII
- Yell (2020), Kinsuke Uchikoshi
- Reach Beyond the Blue Sky (2021), Kawaji Toshiakira
- The Tiger and Her Wings (2024), Tomohiko Hoshi
- Did Someone Happen to Mention Me? (2026), himself

=== Japanese dub ===
- Blind Willow, Sleeping Woman (2024), Ken
