= Mie (singer) =

Japanese actress and singer

- 未唯mie
- Born: Mitsuyo Nemoto (根本 美鶴代); March 9, 1958 (age 68); Aoi-ku, Shizuoka, Japan
- Other name: ミー (1976–1981); MIE (1981–1997); 未唯 (1998–2005)
- Occupations: Singer-songwriter; actress
- Agent: MHO Artist Co. Ltd.
- Spouse: Junzō Tsukuda (m. 1998; div. 2004)
- Musical career
- Genres: J-pop; pop rock; heavy metal; jazz
- Instrument: Vocals
- Years active: 1976–present
- Label: Victor Entertainment (1981–1983, 2023); CBS Sony (1984–1986); Polydor Records (1988–1992); Sanrio (1994); Funhouse (1995); MHO (2006–present)

Japanese name
- Kanji: 未唯mie
- Hiragana: みい
- Katakana: ミー
Transcriptions
- Romanization: Mī
- Website: www.web-mie.com

Mitsuyo Nemoto (根本 美鶴代, Nemoto Mitsuyo) (born March 9, 1958, in Shizuoka, Japan) is a Japanese singer and actress, better known by her stage name Mie (未唯mie (みい), Mī). She is a member of the popular 1970s idol group Pink Lady (ピンク・レディー, Pinku Redī), known in the United States for their self-titled TV program. Mie is represented by her own management firm MHO Artist Co., Ltd.

== Biography ==
=== Early life ===
Mitsuyo Nemoto met Keiko Masuda at Suehiro Junior High School in 1972. A year later, they attended Tokoha University and the Yamaha Music School in Hamamatsu. In May 1974, the duo formed a folk group called "Cookie" (クッキー, Kukkī) and passed Yamaha's "Challenge on Stage" (チャレンジ・オン・ステージ, Charenji on Sutēji) audition.

=== Pink Lady ===
After winning an audition on the talent show Star Tanjō! in March 1976, Nemoto and Masuda signed with Victor Entertainment and became Pink Lady. Nemoto took the stage name "Mie" (ミー, Mī; sometimes spelled "Mii") while Masuda became "Kei" (ケイ). After their debut single "Pepper Keibu" peaked at No. 4 on Oricon's singles charts in August 1976, Pink Lady's second single "S.O.S." reached No. 1, beginning a nine-song streak of No. 1 hits from November 1976 to December 1978. Their biggest single was "UFO" which spent 10 weeks at No. 1 and sold over 1.55 million copies.

When their popularity took a downturn in 1979, Pink Lady turned their focus on the United States, with their first U.S. single "Kiss in the Dark" reaching No. 37 on the Billboard Hot 100 and becoming the first Japanese recording act to chart in America since Kyu Sakamoto in 1963. In 1980, the duo starred with comedian Jeff Altman in the NBC variety show Pink Lady and Jeff. Unfortunately, the show was plagued by the language barrier between the duo and the production crew. Poor ratings and scathing reviews resulted in Pink Lady and Jeff being cancelled after five episodes, with a sixth episode remaining unaired.

Following the failure of Pink Lady and Jeff, as well as the decline of disco music, Pink Lady held a press conference on September 1, 1980, to announce their disbandment within six months. During the press conference, Mie stated that her stage name would change from "ミー" to "MIE" to reflect her solo career. Pink Lady performed their final concert at Korakuen Stadium on March 31, 1981, before going their separate ways. Mie and Kei have since reunited several times to record new songs and perform special concerts.

=== Solo career ===
Following Pink Lady's disbandment, Mie released her first solo album "I MY MIE" on August 21, 1981. Her biggest single was a Japanese-language cover of Moving Pictures' "Never" in 1984, which peaked at No. 4 in Oricon's singles chart and sold 270,000 copies. "Never" was also used as the theme song for the TBS drama series Furyō Shōjo to Yobarete (不良少女とよばれて; Call Me a Bad Girl). Her song "Hai to Diamond" (灰とダイヤモンド, Hai to Daiyamondo; "Diamond in the Ashes") won the Silver Award at the 1984 Tokyo Music Festival. Majority of her singles from 1984 to 1995 were used as either TV drama themes or commercial jingles for companies such as Shiseido, Sanden Corporation, Satsuma Shuzo, and Takefuji.

In 1982, Mie tried her hand in acting in the films A Pool Without Water (水のないプール, Mizu no Nai Pūru) and Call Girl (コールガール, Kōru Gāru); the latter being her first lead role. With these two films, she shed her wholesome family-friendly Pink Lady image for a sexier, more mature persona. A year later, she starred in her own gravure idol TV special titled Mie: Private Time, which was shot in Hawaii.

In 1985, Mie starred as the kunoichi Ochō (お蝶; lit. "Butterfly") in seasons 4 and 5 of the jidaigeki TV series Shadow Warriors.

In 1994, Mie starred in Sanrio's direct-to-video children's special Hello Kitty's Dance! Dance! With MIE (ハローキティのダンス！ダンス！WITH MIE, Harō Kiti no Dansu! Dansu! Uizu Mī), which featured her songs "Dance with Kitty!" (キティとダンス!, Kiti to Dansu!) and "Sapphire in the Sky" (サファイアの空に, Safaia no Sora ni).

In 1998, Mie joined the heavy metal novelty band Animetal as Animetal Lady (アニメタルレディー, Animetaru Redī), a reference to Pink Lady. At the same time, she once again changed the style of her stage name; this time, as the kanji "未唯". On February 21, Animetal Lady Marathon was released, featuring metal covers of popular female-oriented anime theme songs. Animetal Lady Marathon II was released on April 10, 2002, as Mie's final contribution to Animetal.

In 2001, Mie starred as Ethel McCormack in the Japanese adaptation of the Footloose stage musical. The production also featured her Pink Lady partner Keiko Masuda as Vi Moore. She also collaborated with the heavy metal band X.Y.Z.→A to record the single "Nobody Knows Me (but Only Heaven)" that year.

In 2002, at the age of 45, Mie published the gravure book Future Lady: Mothership.

In 2007, Mie produced me ing, her first studio album in 15 years. Released on her own label MHO, the album features songs written by Mie herself. To coincide with the album's release, Victor Entertainment, Sony Music Entertainment Japan, and Universal Music Japan reissued Mie's previous albums with bonus tracks on each CD. A year later, Mie wrote the children's storybook Moco-chan (モコちゃん, Moko-chan) as part of Save the Children's "We Love Children - Artist Picture Book Series" (We love children―アーティストによる絵本シリーズ).

In September 2018, Mie was selected by Kao Corporation to be the brand ambassador of the company's Relief Low-Rise Underwear (リリーフ まるで下着 ローライズ, Rirīfu Marude Shitagi Rōraizu) line.

On March 11, 2022, Mie participated in the Shuichi "Ponta" Murakami tribute concert "One Last Live", performing "Pepper Keibu" (with Yo Hitoto), "Wanted (Shimei Tehai)" (with Maki Ohguro) and "UFO" (with Chisato Moritaka). On December 26, Victor Entertainment announced it will release a new compilation album titled Mie to 未唯mie: 1981–2023 All Time Best on March 1, 2023.

Mie currently performs with her band at Blues Alley Japan in Tokyo, often doing alternate renditions of Pink Lady songs.

== Personal life ==
Mie married music producer Junzō Tsukuda (佃 淳三, Tsukuda Junzō) in 1998, but they divorced in 2004.

Mie's brother Katsuyoshi Nemoto runs a restaurant in Tokyo called Seasonal Cuisine Nemoto (季節料理 根本, Kisetsu Ryōri Nemoto).

== Discography ==
=== Studio albums ===
Title	Album details
I My Mie	Released: August 21, 1981; Label: Victor Entertainment; Formats: LP, cassette
Call Girl "From Mie to You"	Released: October 5, 1982; Label: Victor Entertainment; Formats: LP, cassette
Never	Released: August 25, 1984; Label: CBS Sony; Formats: LP, CD, cassette
Diamond & Gold	Released: April 25, 1992; Label: Polydor Records; Formats: CD, cassette
me ing	Released: October 21, 2007; Label: MHO Artist Co., Ltd.; Formats: CD

=== Live albums ===
Title	Album details
Mie Live	Released: February 21, 1982; Label: Victor Entertainment; Formats: LP, cassette
Shinshun Pink Lady Night: 10th Anniversary Special Live	Released: December 7, 2022; Label: MHO/Sony Music Labels; Formats: CD, digital

=== Compilation albums ===
Title	Album details
Best One Zenkyoku-Shū Mie	Released: 1984; Label: Victor Entertainment; Formats: cassette
Golden Best Mie: Hallelujah Hurricane	Released: June 19, 2002; Label: Sony Music House; Formats: CD
Mie to 未唯mie: 1981–2023 All Time Best	Released: March 1, 2023; Label: Victor Entertainment; Formats: 2CD, digital

=== Singles ===
List of singles, with selected chart positions
Title	Date	Peak chart positions	Sales (JPN)	RIAJ certification	Album
Title	Date	JPN Oricon	Sales (JPN)	RIAJ certification	Album
"Brahms Loves Rock"	July 5, 1981	51	35,000		I My Mie
"More More"	January 21, 1982	94	2,000		Call Girl "From Mie to You"
"Call Girl ~Maria at Dawn~"	September 5, 1982	60	26,000		Call Girl "From Mie to You"
"Madobe kara"	June 5, 1983	—			non-album single
"Shampoo"	November 5, 1983	—			non-album single
"Never"	June 1, 1984	4	274,000	Gold	Never
"Hai to Diamond"	June 21, 1984	80	7,000		Never
"Kagami no Naka no Onna"	March 21, 1985	—			non-album single
"Dreamer"	January 22, 1986	—			non-album single
"Hirugao Roman"	April 21, 1986	—			non-album single
"Ima ga, Choice"	April 25, 1988	—			Diamond & Gold
"Otonadōshi"	April 25, 1990	—			Diamond & Gold
"Jinx"	October 1, 1990	—			Diamond & Gold
"Heisei iki Onna Ade Otoko"	April 25, 1991	—			Diamond & Gold
"Dance with Kitty!"	March 21, 1994	—			non-album single
"Love Jail."	November 25, 1995	—			non-album single
"Soar ~Mada Minu Sora e~"	October 25, 2006	—			me ing
"Hallelujah"	February 17, 2023	—			Mie to 未唯mie: 1981–2023 All Time Best
"Anti Limit"	September 16, 2026	—			non-album single
"—" denotes a release that did not chart.

=== Promotional singles ===
List of singles, with selected chart positions
Title	Date	Album
"Shiawase Shizuoka"	March 25, 1988	non-album single

=== Collaborations ===
- "Break Motion" (ブレイク・モーション, Bureiku Mōshon) (collaboration with Naoko Amihama) (1987-03-21)
- "Nobody Knows Me (but Only Heaven)" (collaboration with X.Y.Z.→A) (2001-11-29)
- "Kawahara no Ishikawa Goemon" (河原の石川五右衛門; "Ishikawa Goemon in the River") (Bad Friends, as part of Kanzashi (簪)) (2009-12-16)
- "Raining in the Sunshine" (collaboration with Demon Kakka) (2012-05-16)

== Filmography ==
=== Film ===
- A Pool Without Water (水のないプール, Mizu no Nai Pūru) (Toei Central Film, 1982)
- Call Girl (コールガール, Kōru Gāru) (Shochiku, 1982)
- Single Girl (シングルガール, Shinguru Gāru) (Shochiku, 1983)

=== TV ===
- Shadow Warriors IV (影の軍団IV, Kage no Gundan Fō) (Fuji TV, 1985 April 2-October 1)
- Shadow Warriors Bakumatsu-hen (影の軍団 幕末編, Kage no Gundan Bakumatsu-hen) (Fuji TV, 1985 October 7-December 30)
- Moero!! Robocon (燃えろ!!ロボコン) - Mitsuko Kurihara
- Garo: Gold Storm Sho (牙狼-GARO- -GOLD STORM- 翔) - Episode 10 (TXN, 2015 June 19)

=== Home video ===
- Hello Kitty's Dance! Dance! With MIE (ハローキティのダンス！ダンス！WITH MIE, Harō Kiti no Dansu! Dansu! Uizu Mī) (Sanrio, 1994)
- Future Lady: Mothership (フューチャー・レディ MOTHER SHIP, Fyūchā Redi Mazā Shippu) (Takeshobo, 2002)
- 未唯mie with 3/7(seven) LIVE at Blues Alley Japan 2008.11.28 (MHO, 2010)
- 未唯mie MONTHLY LIVE 2010.06.25 Pink Lady Night (MHO, 2010)

== Bibliography ==
- MIE By All Means, You (MIEどうしても、おまえだ, MIE Dōshitemo, Omaeda) (Shueisha, 1983)
- Future Lady: Mothership - Mie's Photo Album (フューチャー・レディ MOTHER SHIP―未唯写真集, Fyūchā Redi Mazā Shippu ― Mī Shashin-shū) (Takeshobo, 2002)
- Mie's Diet Picture Book (未唯のダイエット絵本, Mī no Daietto Ehon) (Gakken, 2002-11-29)
- Moco-chan (モコちゃん, Moko-chan) (Random House/Kodansha, 2008-04-23)
- "Consciousness of Beauty" - My Habit of Always Being a Pink Lady (美の意識―いつでもピンク・レディーでいられる私の習慣, `Bi no Ishiki'- Itsu demo Pinku Redī de Irareru Watashi no Shūkan ~) (Tokuma Shoten, 2012-02-21)
