= Days of Innocence =

Studio album by Moving Pictures
- Released: 12 October 1981
- Recorded: 1981
- Studios: The Music Farm, Studios 301, Trafalgar Studios
- Genres: Rock, New wave, post-punk
- Length: 43:13
- Label: Wheatley
- Producer: Charles Fisher

Moving Pictures chronology
Days of Innocence (1981)	Matinee (1983)

Singles from Days of Innocence
- 1. "Bustin' Loose" Released: October 1981; 2. "What About Me" Released: January 1982; 3. "Sweet Cherie" Released: May 1982; 4. "Winners" Released: October 1982

Professional ratings
Review scores
Source	Rating
AllMusic	4/5 stars

Days of Innocence is the debut studio album by Australian band, Moving Pictures in October 1981. It spent 7 weeks at the top of the Australian Album charts in 1982 and was certified 3× Platinum. It spawned the 1982 number one single in Australia "What About Me". "Winners" was not on this album & was a stand alone single released "between albums". It has featured as one of the bonus tracks on the 2000 CD re-release.

== Track listing ==
1. "Nothing to Do" (Alex Smith, Garry Frost) - 3:28
2. "What About Me" (Garry Frost, Frances Swan Frost) - 3:32
3. "Round Again" (A. Smith, G. Frost) - 4:06
4. "Bustin' Loose" (A. Smith) - 4:37
5. "Wings" (A. Smith) - 4:53
6. "The Angel and the Madman" (A. Smith, Charlie Cole, G. Frost) - 4:28
7. "Sweet Cherie" (A. Smith, C. Cole, G. Frost) - 3:38
8. "So Tired" (A. Smith) - 4:03
9. "Joni and the Romeo" (A. Smith) - 3:31
10. "Streetheart" (A. Smith, Ian Lees, C. Cole, Andrew Thompson, G. Frost, Paul Freeland) - 7:01

== Musicians ==
- Alex Smith - Vocals
- Garry Frost - Guitar, Backing vocals
- Andrew Thompson - Saxophones
- Charlie Cole - Keyboards, Trumpet, Backing vocals
- Ian Lees - Bass
- Paul Freeland - Drums

== Charts ==
=== Weekly charts ===
Chart (1981/82)	Peak position
Australian (Kent Music Report)	1
US Billboard 200	101

=== Year-end charts ===
Chart (1982)	Peak position
Australian (Kent Music Report)	4

== Certifications ==
Region	Certification	Certified units/sales
Australia (ARIA)	3× Platinum	150,000^{^}
^{^} Shipments figures based on certification alone.
