= Keiko Takahashi =

Japanese actress (born 1955)

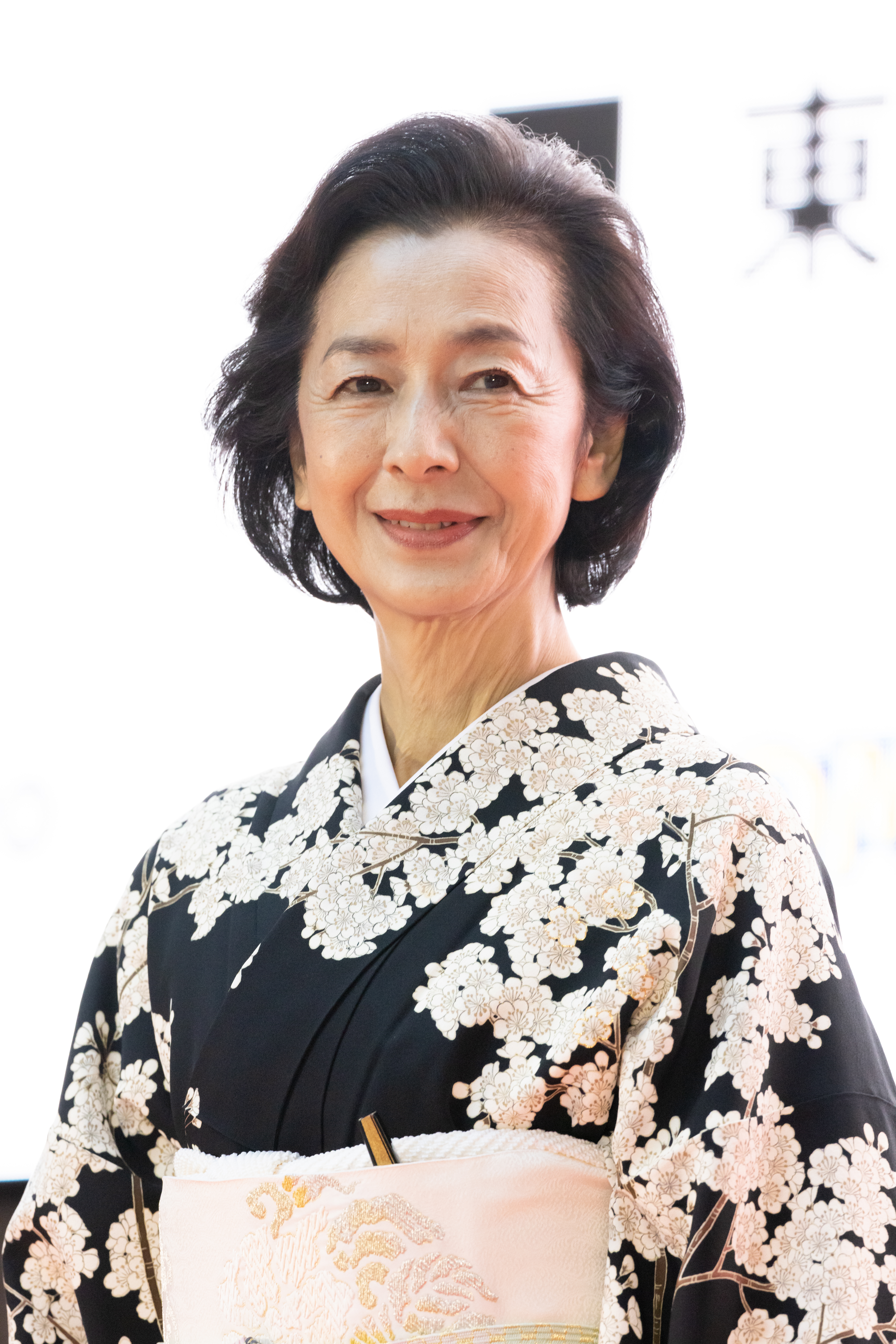
- 2022
- Born: January 22, 1955 (age 71); Shibecha, Hokkaidō, Japan
- Other name: Keiko Sekine (関根恵子)
- Occupation: Actress
- Years active: 1970–present
- Spouse: Banmei Takahashi
- Website: http://www.blow-up.jp/

Keiko Takahashi (高橋惠子, Takahashi Keiko; born January 22, 1955 in Shibecha, Hokkaidō, Japan) is a Japanese actress. Prior to marrying director Banmei Takahashi in 1982, she went by her maiden name Keiko Sekine (関根恵子). She debuted in the 1970 film High School Student Blues. Her second film, おさな妻, earned her the Golden Arrow Award for Newcomer of the Year.

In 1981 she appeared in the Nikkatsu Roman Porno film Love Letter, a fictionalized account of the life of poet Mitsuharu Kaneko, which Nikkatsu hoped would appeal to both male and female audiences. In 1982 she was the female lead in her husband Banmei Takahashi's launch into mainstream film, Tattoo Ari. In 2008, she won the Mainichi Film Award for Best Supporting Actress for her work in Fumiko no Umi. She was given Mainichi's Tanaka Kinuyo Award in 2010.

== Filmography ==
=== Film ===
- High School Student Blues (1970)
- Osanazuma (1970)
- Just for You (1970)
- The Forbidden Fruit (1970)
- Games (1971)
- Rise, Fair Sun (1973) as Haruko
- Mainline to Terror (1975) as Tomoko Kimihara
- The Gate of Youth (1975) as Asuza Hatae
- Gambare Wakadaishō
- Love Letter (1981) as Yuko Kano
- Tattoo Ari (1982) as Michiyo
- Dai Nippon Teikoku (1982) as Miyo Arai
- Lake of Illusions (1982)
- Wolf (1982)
- Love Letter (1985)
- Jiro's Story (1987)
- Door (1988)
- Otokotachi no kaita e) (1996)
- Gendai ninkyoden (1997)
- Magnitude (1997)
- Uzumaki (2000)
- Drug (2001)
- Legendary Crocodile Jake and His Fellows (2004)
- Fumiko no Umi (2007)
- Be Sure to Share (2009)
- Akai Tama (2015)
- Summer Blooms (2018)
- Analog (2023) as Reiko Mizushima
- I Am Kirishima (2025)

=== Television ===
- Taiyō ni Hoero! (1972–74) as Nobuko Uchida (Shinko)
- Tokugawa Ieyasu (1983)
- Nobunaga: King of Zipangu (1992) as Rui
- Aoi (2001) as Orin
- Seibu Keisatsu Special (2004)
- Soda Master (2026) as Shoko Kikuhara
