= Banmei Takahashi =

Japanese film director (born 1949)

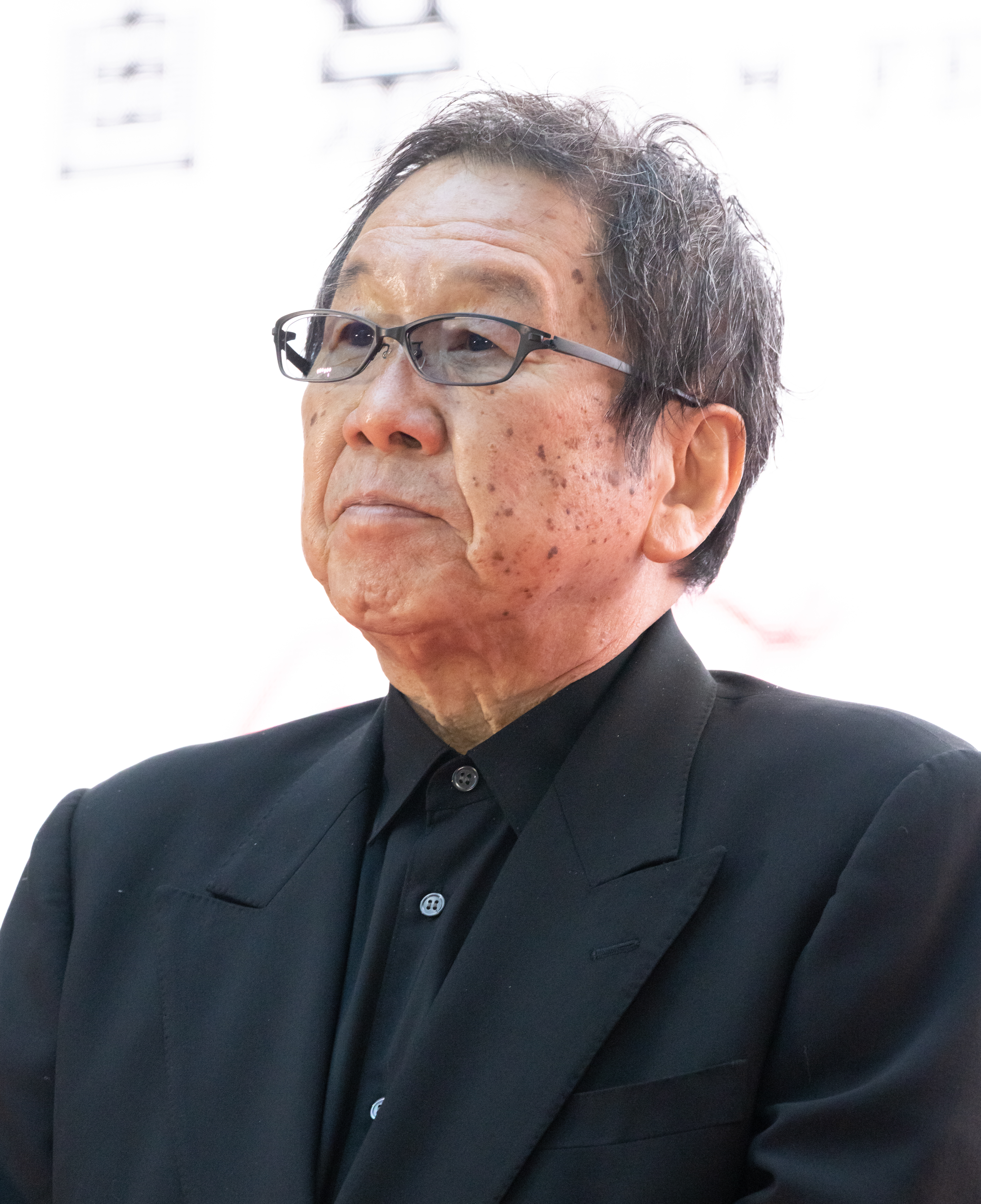
- Takahashi in 2022
- Born: May 10, 1949 (age 77); Nara, Nara, Japan
- Occupation: Film director
- Years active: 1975–present
- Spouse: Keiko Takahashi

Banmei Takahashi (高橋伴明, Takahashi Banmei) (or Tomoaki Takahashi) is a Japanese film director. Takahashi started his career in the pink film industry, making his directorial debut in 1972 with Escaped Rapist Criminal. Due to a disagreement with his producer, Takahashi quit the film industry for a couple years. He joined pink film pioneer Kōji Wakamatsu's production studio in 1975, working as a script-writer until Wakamatsu produced Takahashi's second film, Delinquent File: Juvenile Prostitution (1976). For the next few years Takahashi averaged five films annually at Wakamatsu's studio, until Takahashi left to start his own production company in 1979.

Takahashi married Nikkatsu Roman Porno and pink film actress Keiko Sekine who then changed her name to Keiko Takahashi and starred in several of Takahashi's films. Sekine appeared in Takahashi's Tattoo Ari (1982), a mainstream box-office hit which won Takahashi the award for Best Director at the 4th Yokohama Film Festival. With the success of this film, Takahashi dissolved Takahashi Productions to focus on mainstream filmmaking. Takahashi's 1994 film Ai no Shinsekai, inspired by photographer Nobuyoshi Araki's work, is significant as the first Japanese production to play uncensored and unfogged domestically.

== Selected filmography ==
- Escaped Rapist Criminal (1972)
- Delinquent File: Juvenile Prostitution (1976)
- Girl Mistress (1980)
- Wolf (狼, Ōkami) (1982)
- Tattoo Ari (1982)
- Door (1988)
- Neo Chinpira: Zoom Goes the Bullet (1990)
- Door II: Tokyo Diary (1991)
- Human Scramble: Delinquent (1993)
- Ai no Shinsekai (1994)
- Hibi (2005)
- Oka o Koete (2008)
- Zen (2009)
- BOX: The Hakamada Case (2010)
- Made in Japan: Kora! (2011)
- Takumi: The Man Beyond Borders (2012)
- Blood Bead (2015)
- Peaceful Death (2021)
- No Place to Go (2022)
- I Am Kirishima (2025)
- Euthanasia Special Zone (2026)
