= Tattoo Ari =

- DVD cover

Japanese name
- Kanji: TATOO＜刺青＞あり
- Directed by: Banmei Takahashi
- Written by: Takuya Nishioka
- Produced by: Kazuyuki Izutsu
- Starring: Ryudo Uzaki; Keiko Sekine; Misako Watanabe; Ayako Ōta; Yoshiko Osimi
- Cinematography: Yuichi Nagata
- Edited by: Junichi Kikuchi
- Music by: Ryudo Uzaki
- Production companies: Takahashi Pro; International Television Films
- Distributed by: Art Theatre Guild (ATG)
- Release date: June 5, 1982 (Japan)
- Running time: 107 minutes
- Country: Japan
- Language: Japanese

Tattoo Ari (Japanese: TATTOO＜刺青＞あり) is a 1982 Japanese film directed by Banmei Takahashi. The film was based on the life of Akiyoshi Umekawa.

== Cast ==
- Ryudo Uzaki as Akio Takeda
- Keiko Sekine as Michiyo
- Misako Watanabe as Sadako Takeda
- Ayako Ōta (太田あや子) as Miyoko
- Yoshiko Osimi (忍海よしこ) as Satoko
- Jirō Yabuki as Teruya Shimada
- Shirō Shimomoto as Sato
- Hitoshi Ueki as President
- Kazuhiro Yamaji as Michiyo's new lover
- Maiko Kazama as Sanae

== Background ==
Director Banmei Takahashi was at this point a veteran director of pink films with a resume of about 40 movies. This film in the action genre represents a new direction for Takahashi. Tattoo Ari was a critical and box-office hit and with his award for Best Director from the Yokohama Film Festival launched Takahashi on a mainstream career. The female lead in Tattoo Ari, Keiko Sekine, was Banmei Takahashi's wife and later acted under the name Keiko Takahashi.

== Awards and nominations ==
4th Yokohama Film Festival

- Won: Best Director - Banmei Takahashi
- Won: Best Actor - Ryudo Uzaki (宇崎竜童)
- 3rd Best Film
