= Diamond & Gold =

Studio album by MIE
- Released: 25 April 1992
- Genre: Pop rock
- Language: Japanese
- Label: Polydor Records

MIE chronology
NEVER (1984)	Diamond & Gold (1992)	Golden Best Mie: Hallelujah Hurricane (2002)

Singles from Diamond & Gold
- 1. "Ima ga, Choiice" Released: 25 April 1988; 2. "Otona-dōshi" Released: 25 April 1990; 3. "Jinx" Released: 1 October 1991; 4. "Heisei iki On'na Ade Otoko" Released: 25 April 1991

Diamond & Gold (ダイヤモンド&ゴールド, Daiyamondo ando Gōrudo) is the fourth studio album by Japanese singer MIE. The album was released through Polydor Records on April 25, 1992. It was reissued on October 24, 2007 as Diamond & Gold +1, with one bonus track.

== Track listing ==
No.	Title	Lyrics	Music	Arrangement	Length
1.	"Broken Heart"	Kaoru Itō	Itō	Masaki Iwamoto
2.	"Ima ga, Choice" (Ima ga, Choisu (いまが、Choice, "Now, the Choice"))	Midori Edo	Hideo Matsufuji	Tetsutarō Sakurai
3.	"Kanashi Ikeredo" ((悲しいけれど, "I'm Sad"))	Masao Urino	Daisuke Inoue	Mikiya Katakura
4.	"Otona-dōshi" ((おとなどうし, "Adults"))	Yūho Iwasato	Matsufuji	Matsufuji
5.	"Ameonna" ((雨女, "Rain Woman"))	Itō	Itō	Iwamoto
6.	"Jinx" (Jinkusu (ジンクス))	Urino	Hiroaki Serizawa	Iwamoto
7.	"SWEET"	Edo	Sakurai	Sakurai
8.	"Fuyu no Niji" ((冬の虹, "Winter Rainbow"))	Urino	Serizawa	Iwamoto
9.	"Kanashī Ame" ((悲しい雨, "Sad Rain"))	Itō	Itō	Iwamoto
10.	"Heisei iki On'na Ade Otoko" ((平成粋女・艶男, "Heisei Refined Woman, Shimmering Man"))	Urino	Inoue	Katakura

2007 CD bonus track

No.	Title	Lyrics	Music	Arrangement	Length
11.	"Long Fly"	Edo	Matsufuji	Sakurai
