= Never (Moving Pictures song) =

1984 single by Moving Pictures

- Japan release cover

Single by Moving Pictures

from the album Footloose
- B-side: We Share Our Love
- Released: May 28, 1984 (Australia)
- Studio: Record Plant, Los Angeles, California, U.S.
- Genre: Pop rock
- Length: 3:45
- Label: Columbia; EMI (Australia)
- Songwriters: Dean Pitchford; Michael Gore
- Producer: John Boylan

Moving Pictures singles chronology
"Back to the Blues and Booze" (1983)	"Never" (1984)	"What About Me (Re-release)" (1989)

Audio
- "Never" on YouTube

"Never" is a song written by Dean Pitchford and Michael Gore and recorded by Australian pop rock band Moving Pictures. It was featured on the chart-topping soundtrack album of the 1984 motion picture Footloose. The song is best known for a scene in the film when an angst-ridden Ren McCormack (Kevin Bacon) punchdances around an abandoned warehouse.

The song was also included in the soundtrack of the 2007 film Hot Rod, which parodies the punchdance scene with Rod Kimble (Andy Samberg) in a forest. More recently, on April 27, 2014, the song was used in "Baby Got Black", the eighteenth episode of season 12 of Family Guy, with Peter Griffin parodying the Footloose punchdance scene.

Despite the popularity of the song, Moving Pictures were never paid royalties from its use. According to lead vocalist Alex Smith, “We were just the lowest part of the food chain. Gobbled up by companies and people that suddenly stopped existing, when we asked where our money was. The things you get talked into doing! Anyway we got to record at Sound City and The Record Plant but a couple of bucks would have been nice. Hence, we 'Never' play the song.” Guitarist Garry Frost also commented: "We performed it, it was written by the guys that made the movie, and we got nothing from it. Someone made a lot of money out of that song, and it wasn’t us."

== Track listing ==
No.	Title	Writer(s)	Length
1.	"Never"	Dean Pitchford; Michael Gore	3:45
2.	"We Share Our Love"	Alex Smith; Charlie Cole	2:54

== Personnel ==
- Alex Smith – lead vocals
- Garry Frost – guitar
- Charlie Cole – keyboards
- Alan Pasqua - synthesizer
- Ian Lees – bass
- Andrew Thompson – saxophone
- Mark Meyer – drums
- Paulinho da Costa – percussion
- Marcy Levy, Richard Page, Carmen Grillo, Tom Kelly, Steve George – backing vocals

== Mie version ==
"Never"

Single by Mie

from the album Never
- Language: Japanese
- B-side: "Otsudane"
- Released: June 1, 1984
- Genre: J-pop; Pop rock
- Label: CBS Sony
- Songwriters: Dean Pitchford; Michael Gore; Gorō Matsui

Mie singles chronology
"Shampoo" (1983)	"Never" (1984)	"Hai to Diamond" (1984)

Audio
- "Never" on YouTube

A Japanese-language version of "Never" was written by Gorō Matsui and recorded by singer Mie, best known as one-half of the J-pop duo Pink Lady. The single became the most successful in her solo career, peaking at number four in Oricon's singles charts and selling 274,000 copies. "Never" was also used as the theme song for the TBS drama series Furyō Shōjo to Yobarete (不良少女とよばれて; Call Me a Bad Girl).

"Otsudane", the single's B-side, was used for commercials promoting Satsuma Shuzo's Mild Shiranami Otsudane sake.

=== Track listing ===
No.	Title	Lyrics	Music	Length
1.	"Never"	Gorō Matsui	Dean Pitchford; Michael Gore
2.	"Otsudane (おつだね; "That's Good")"	Takeshi Shima	Ryudo Uzaki

=== Charts ===
Chart (1984)	Peak position
Japanese Singles Chart (Oricon)	4
