= Moving Pictures (band) =

Australian rock band

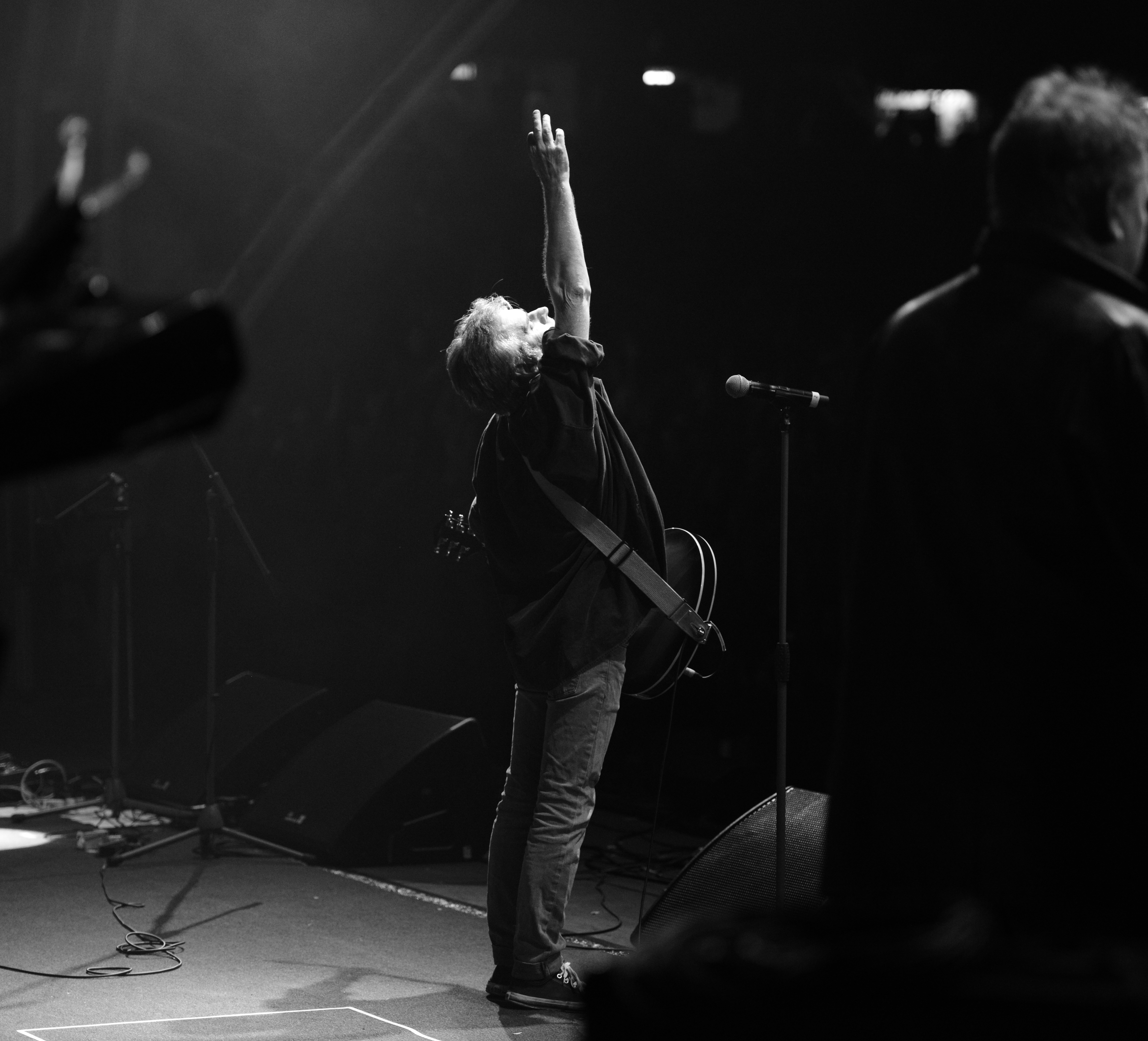
- Moving Pictures lead singer Alex Smith performing onstage in 2015

Background information
- Origin: Sydney, New South Wales, Australia
- Genre: Pop rock
- Years active: 1980–1987, 2005, 2011–present
- Labels: Network, Epic, Elektra
- Members: Charlie Cole; Garry Frost; Alex Smith; Mark Meyer; Scott Simpkins
- Past members: Ian Lees; Paul Freeland; Joey Amenta; Kevin Bennett; Andy Thompson; Andy Bickers
- Website: moving-pictures-band.com

Moving Pictures are an Australian rock band formed in 1980. Their debut album, Days of Innocence, was issued in October 1981 and eventually peaked at No. 1 on the Kent Music Report Albums Chart in February the following year. In January 1982, they released their single, "What About Me", which reached No. 1 on the Kent Singles Chart. Later that year, Elektra Records issued Days of Innocence and "What About Me" in North America. The single reached No. 29 on the Billboard Hot 100 and appeared on the associated year-end Hot 100 list for 1983. A proposed series of United States performances supporting REO Speedwagon, Tom Petty, and Hall & Oates fell through when Elektra was substantially reorganised.

In November 1982, another single, "Winners", peaked at No. 12 in Australia. In October 1983, their second album, Matinee, was released. It reached No. 16 and, of its four singles, only the lead single, "Back to the Streets", reached the Top 40. Their non-album single "Never" was used for two film soundtracks, Footloose (1984) and Hot Rod (2007). By the end of 1987, the group had disbanded. The band reformed in 2011 with annual tours.

== History ==
=== 1980–1987 ===
Moving Pictures were formed in Sydney in 1980 with Charlie Cole on keyboards and trumpet; Paul Freeland on drums; Garry Frost on guitar, keyboards, and vocals; Ian Lees on bass guitar (ex-This Side Up); Alex Smith on vocals and guitar (Bilgola Bop Band, This Side Up); and Andrew Thompson on saxophone (Bilgola Bop Band). Initially they performed as a "hard working, R&B-inspired pub-rock outfit", playing up to 250 shows a year, with their early influences being Bruce Springsteen, Graham Parker and Van Morrison. In early 1981 Moving Pictures were signed to the Wheatley management team – run by former Masters Apprentices' bass guitarist Glenn Wheatley – and the allied Wheatley Records label. Their debut single, "Bustin' Loose", broke into the Top 50 on the Kent Singles Chart in October.

Their debut album, Days of Innocence, also appeared in October 1981 and initially failed to reach the Top 40 on the Kent Albums Chart. It was produced by Charles Fisher (Radio Birdman, The Radiators, Air Supply). The band's live show was all about their rock leanings but the album featured strong ballads that belied that live rock act. In January 1982 they issued another single, "What About Me", which remained at No. 1 for six weeks early that year. Renewed interest in the album saw it reach No. 1 in February on the Kent Albums Chart. The album became the fourth-highest-selling album of the year. "What About Me" won the 'Best Single' category at the 1982 Countdown Awards. It was the second-highest-selling single in Australia for 1982, behind Survivor's "Eye of the Tiger".

The album's third single, "Sweet Cherie", from Days of Innocence peaked at 51, while the fourth and final single, "Winners", reached No. 12 in November. By that time Freeland had been replaced on drums by Mark Meyer (ex-Stylus, Richard Clapton Band, Mark Gillespie Band). Moving Pictures had signed to the Elektra distribution label in the United States, which issued Days of Innocence and "What About Me" in North America. The single reached No. 29 on the Billboard pop singles chart, spending 26 weeks inside the Billboard Hot 100. It made Billboard's year-end Hot 100 list for 1983, at No. 88 – a rare feat for a single with such a low peak position. The song made an unusual comeback in 1989, peaking at No. 46. On the eve of their planned US tour to capitalise on their success there, Elektra was substantially reorganised and their relationship collapsed. The tour was to include support slots with REO Speedwagon, Tom Petty and Hall & Oates as well as their own headlining shows. In hindsight this was Moving Pictures' best opportunity to enter the US market, but it was ruined.

In October 1983 their second album, Matinee, also produced by Fisher, was released. It reached No. 16 in Australia and, of its four singles, only "Back to the Streets", reached the Top 40. The album captured more of the band's live show feel and rock leanings. Late in 1983 the band toured Japan. Due to band problems Frost left the group in 1984, saying "the group had lost direction". He was temporarily replaced on guitar by Joey Amenta (ex-Taste, Redhouse, Russell Morris Band, Wendy and the Rockets) until Kevin Bennett (Allied Harp, Wild Colonial Boys) joined the line-up in 1985. The group continued to tour domestically and had gained a strong, loyal following. In May 1987 they undertook the Live Picture Show Tour and disbanded afterwards. In December that year the next album, The Last Picture Show, based on the tour was issued.

=== 1987–present: Post Moving Pictures ===
Ex-Moving Pictures members have undertaken various musical careers:

- Charlie Cole initially worked in Los Angeles, in 1990 he joined Frost's band, 1927. He has recorded work in America with members of the Blues Brothers Band, with James Blundell (in Nashville) and did session work for various individuals and bands including Ed Kuepper. In 1999 Cole returned to Australia and joined The Shuffle Kings in which, as from 2003, he played trumpet, recorder, keyboards and the piano accordion.
- Garry Frost left Moving Pictures in 1984 feeling the group had lost direction. He concentrated on his song-writing and piano playing – so much so that he developed tendonitis in his wrists. In 1987 he formed a pop-rock group, 1927, with Eric Weideman, whom he had seen performing on Hey Hey It's Saturday's "Red Faces" talent segment. Whilst with 1927, Frost also worked with Gyan co-writing her 1989 hit "Wait". "Wait" was the first single from her self-titled debut album, which won an ARIA award and was certified platinum. In 1990 Frost left 1927, and became co-partner in a Sydney post production studio, he continued writing, performing and producing. Some of Frost's work in the early 2000s was with Sydney singer-songwriter, Djamel and vocalist Carlie Fairburn.
- Ian Lees formed the blues band, Chasin' the Train, with fellow former Moving Pictures member Kevin Bennett. Lees then became a session bass guitarist, he played with Mal Eastick and Lee Kernaghan. Over his career he has played for The Wild Colonial Boys, Tommy Emmanuel, Tania Kernaghan, Mondo Rock, Phil Emmanuel, Melinda Schneider Gina Jeffreys, Matt Taylor, and Kevin Borich. His death, after suffering a heart attack, was announced on 23 November 2025.
- Alex Smith formed Alex Smith and the Volunteers aka Alex Smith and DBM, in 1989. The line up included Ben Little (ex-Pink Slips) on guitar, Lee Borkman (Scribble) on keyboards, Dave Carter on bass guitar and Mark O'Shea on drums. In 1991 Smith fronted The Blues Liners, which released a single, "This Time Tomorrow", recorded at Alberts Studios.
- Andy Thompson became a session musician, he contributed a saxophone solo on Elton John's track, "Li'l 'Frigerator", from his 1984 album, Breaking Hearts. While a member of Moving Pictures Thompson had worked for Mark Gillespie in 1982 and then with Australian Crawl in 1983 for their album, Semantics. He contributed to Jenny Morris' 1987 album, Body And Soul. He toured with Cold Chisel and played with Dire Straits on their Brothers in Arms tour.
- Kevin Bennett, after forming Chasin' the Train with Lees, went on to blues, roots band, The Flood.
- Mark Meyer joined Chasin' the Train alongside Lees and Bennett. He has performed in Wendy Matthews touring band and together with Lees have both been long term rhythm section for James Blundell. Meyer and Lees have also worked with Australian guitarist-singer Lawrie Minson and Lee Kernaghan.
- Original drummer Paul Freeland left the music business to focus on a career in wood-sculpting. Having received formal training as a metallurgist before joining the band, he would also go on to teach manual arts at The School of Performing Arts in Newtown. He died of complications from Alzheimer's in April 2020.
- Saxophonist Andy Bickers died from cancer on 10 July 2026.

=== 2005: Reunion ===
In 2005 Moving Pictures reformed as an acoustic trio, with Smith and Cole joined by Dave Carter (ex Alex Smith and DBM), for 26 performances throughout New South Wales and Queensland. In July 2011, to commemorate the thirtieth anniversary of the initial release of Days of Innocence, Moving Pictures reformed with the line-up of Cole, Frost, Lees, Meyer, Smith and Thompson. They performed in Melbourne and Sydney, including an appearance on breakfast TV show, Sunrise, performing their signature song. Smith described the reformation "this line-up and this band hasn't been in the same room together since 1984 ... I'm just going to play it by ear – same as I used to do every day in the past [...] It will be like, 'What are we here for? We're here to play and have a great time'".

== Legacy ==
In February 2004 Moving Pictures' hit single, "What About Me", was covered by Australian Idol (2003) runner-up Shannon Noll, which peaked at No. 1 on the ARIA Singles Chart – for four weeks. Noll liked the original, "it's just a great song about average people, and there are a lot of us out there ... I didn't mess around with it heaps, I just sang it as honest as possible". "What About Me" is the first Australian single to achieve No. 1 on two separate occasions by two different artists.

Their song, "Never", was used as part of the soundtrack for two films, 1984's Footloose and 2007's Hot Rod. In both cases the song accompanied the film's star doing a punchdance routine. The punchdance routine was also parodied in the Family Guy season 12 episode "Baby Got Black". The band have indicated that due to the bankruptcy of their U.S. record company, and unfortunate timing of the release of "Never", they had not received any royalties whatsoever for the track.

In 2000, BMG Australia released an album, Days of Innocence – The Ultimate Collection, which has remastered tracks from their debut album (reproducing its original cover art), with bonus tracks from Matinee and a couple non-album single sides, such as "Never".

== Members ==
Current members

- Charlie Cole – keyboards, trumpet (1978–1987, 2005, 2011–present)
- Alex Smith – vocals, guitar (1978–1987, 2005, 2011–present)
- Garry Frost – guitar, keyboards (1978–1983, 2011–present)
- Mark Meyer – drums (1982–1987, 2011–present)
- Scott Simpkins – saxophone (2018–present)

Former members

- Ian Riley Lees – bass (1978–1987, 2011–2025; his death)
- Paul Freeland – drums (1978–1982; died 2020)
- Andy Thompson – saxophone (1978–1987, 2011–2016)
- Joey Amenta – guitar (1983–1985)
- Kevin Bennett – guitar, keyboards (1985–1987)
- Andy Bickers – saxophone (2017–2018; died 2026)

== Discography ==
=== Studio albums ===
Title	Details	Peak chart positions		Certifications
Title	Details	AUS	US	Certifications
Days of Innocence	Released: 12 October 1981; Label: Wheatley Records (WBEX 1005); Format: LP, Cassette, 8-Track Cartridge	1	101	AUS: 3× Platinum
Matinee	Released: 10 October 1983; Label: Wheatley Records (WBEX 1010); Format: LP, Cassette	16	-	

=== Acoustic albums ===
Title	Details
Picture This	Released: 9 October 2015; Label: Liberation Music; Format: CD; Note: Reworking of Old Songs

=== Live albums ===
Title	Details
The Last Picture Show	Released: 30 November 1987; Label: Wheatley Records (SPCD 1022); Format: CD, LP
Live At The State Theatre	Released: 2011; Recorded: July 2011; Label: Empire Touring; Format: CD
Live Under The Palms	Released: 2020; Recorded: March 2020 in NSW, Australia; Label: Punwin Productions; Format: CD

=== Compilation albums ===
Title	Details
Greatest Hits	Released: 1984; Label: CBS/Sony; Format: LP, Cassette
Days of Innocence – The Ultimate Collection	Released: 2000; Label: BMG (74321720302); Format: CD

=== Singles ===
Year	Title	Peak chart positions		Certifications	Album
Year	Title	AUS	US	Certifications	Album
1981	"Bustin' Loose"	43	-		Days of Innocence
1982	"What About Me"	1	29	ARIA: Gold	Days of Innocence
1982	"Sweet Cherie"	51	-		Days of Innocence
1982	"Winners"	12	-		Days of Innocence
1983	"Back to the Streets"	37	-		Matinee
1983	"Where they Belong"	80	-		Matinee
1983	"Back to the Blues and Booze"	80	-		Matinee
1984	"Never"	-	-		Footloose soundtrack
1987	"What About Me" (Live)	-	46		The Last Picture Show

== Awards and nominations ==
=== Countdown Australian Music Awards ===
Countdown was an Australian pop music TV series on national broadcaster ABC-TV from 1974 to 1987, it presented music awards from 1979 to 1987, initially in conjunction with magazine TV Week. The TV Week / Countdown Awards were a combination of popular-voted and peer-voted awards.

Year	Nominee / work	Award	Result
1981	themselves	Best New Talent	Nominated
1982	"What About Me?"	Best Single	Won
1982	themselves	Most Popular Group	Nominated
1983	Charles Fisher for work with Moving Pictures	Best Record Producer of the Year	Nominated
