= Yoko Aki =

Japanese songwriter and actress (born 1945)

- Born: May 1, 1945 (age 81); Nagano, Nagano, Japan
- Occupation: Actress

Yoko Aki (阿木 燿子, Aki Yōko; born May 1, 1945) is a Japanese songwriter, actress, novelist and essayist. With her husband, Ryudo Uzaki, she has written many songs for other singers, with Aki as lyricist and Uzaki as composer. They are especially famous for a series of hit songs of Momoe Yamaguchi's.

She has acted in several films, and she won the award for best supporting actress at the 5th Hochi Film Award for Shiki Natsuko. She was a model under an exclusive contract with Kanebo Cosmetics for many years.

== Career ==
In 1969, Aki wrote Blue Lonesome Dream which is a debut song of the Group Sounds band Julie and The baron for the first time. Her husband, Ryudo Uzaki composed it. Then they wrote many hit songs. They also co-wrote two songs for the soundtrack of the nature documentary Elephant Story.

In 1980, she made her debut as an actress.

== Discography ==
(as lyricist)

- Manjushaka
- Playback Part Two
- "I MY MIE" (MIE)

== Filmography ==
- Shiki Natsuko (1980)
- The Family Game (1983)
- Keshin (1986)
- A Homansu (1986)
- Devilman (2004)
