= Ryudo Uzaki =

Japanese musician, composer, and actor (born 1946)

- 宇崎 竜童
- Born: Shūji Kimura (木村 修史); February 23, 1946 (age 80); Kyoto, Japan
- Occupations: Musician; composer; actor
- Years active: 1973–present
- Spouse: Yoko Aki
- Musical career
- Genres: Kayōkyoku; pop; rock
- Formerly of: Down Town Boogie-Woogie Band

Ryudo Uzaki (宇崎 竜童, Uzaki Ryūdō; born February 23, 1946) is a Japanese musician, composer, and actor. His group, the Down Town Boogie-Woogie Band, was one of the most prominent 1970s Japanese rock bands. He also composed many of Momoe Yamaguchi's songs with Yoko Aki.

Uzaki has also worked as a film composer, providing the scores to such productions as The Miracle of Joe Petrel, Umi e, See You and Shaso. In addition, Uzaki has frequently worked as an actor, and he also directed the 1982 film Saraba aibo, aka So Long, My Partner: Rock Is Sex.

He is married to lyricist and actress Yoko Aki.

== Discography ==
=== Down Town Boogie-Woogie Band ===
Title	Date	Notes
Minato No Yoko, Yokohama, Yokosuka		
Namida No Secret Love		
Mi Mo Kokoro Mo		

=== Composer ===
Artist	Title	Date	Notes
Momoe Yamaguchi	"Yokosuka Story"	1977	
Momoe Yamaguchi	"Rock'n'roll Widow"	1979	
Momoe Yamaguchi	"Imitation Gold"		
Momoe Yamaguchi	"Manjushaka"		
MIE	"I MY MIE"	August 21, 1981	
Cute	"Edo no Temari Uta II"	July 30, 2008	Cute won a Gold Award and was nominated for the main Japan Records Award (Grand Prix) with the song
Hiroshi Itsuki	"Edo no Temari Uta"	October 22, 2008	
Jero	"Umiyuki"	2008	
Meiko Kaji	"Aitsu no Sukiso na Burusu"	2011	

== Acting roles ==
=== Film ===
Title	Role	Date	Notes
Torakku Yarō: Go-iken muyō		1975	
Double Suicide of Sonezaki	Tokubei	1978	Co-starring with Meiko Kaji.
G.I. Samurai		1979	
Aftermath of Battles Without Honor and Humanity		1979	
Yokohama BJ Blues	Jojo	1981	
Tattoo Ari	Akio Takeda	1982	Won Best Actor at the 4th Yokohama Film Festival.
Shanghai Rhapsody	Wataru Matsumoto, aka "Bakumatsu"	1984	
Umi e, See You	Katsuragi	1988	Also co-composed the soundtrack with Shūichi Chino.
The Crossing	The Homeless/Masked Man	2000	
Godzilla, Mothra and King Ghidorah: Giant Monsters All-Out Attack	Admiral Taizo Tachibana	2001	
Devilman	Keisuke Makimura	2004	
Pecoross' Mother and Her Days	Conductor	2013	
Hamon: Yakuza Boogie	Takizawa	2017	
Catch Me on the Shore		2019	
Fancy		2020	
The Voice of Sin	Tatsuo	2020	
Peaceful Death		2021	
I Am Makimoto		2022	
Bad Lands	Mandala	2023	
A Light in the Harbor	Tokio Kawamura	2025	
Goodbye My Car	Makoto Ozaki	2026	
Last Dance	Ryoji Kurosaki	2027	

=== Television ===
Title	Role	Date	Notes
Ranman	Nakahama Manjirō	2023	Asadora
Like a Dragon: Yakuza	Jin Goda	2024	
Last Samurai Standing		2025	
