= List of songs by Prism =

This is a list of songs recorded and performed by Canadian Rock band Prism.

== Released songs ==
Title	Year	Album	Author(s)
Acid Rain	1980	Young and Restless	Lindsay Mitchell
Across the Border	2008	Big Black Sky	Al Harlow
Amelia	1977	Prism	Jim Vallance
American Music	1980	Young and Restless	Lindsay Mitchell
Another World	1980	Young and Restless	Al Harlow
Armageddon	1979	Armageddon	Lindsay Mitchell
Bad News (Travels Fast)	1993	Jericho	Randy Bachman
Beat Street	1983	Beat Street	Davitt Sigerson, Henry Small, Richie Zito
Big Black Sky	2008	Big Black Sky	Al Harlow
Blue Collar	1983	Beat Street	Davitt Sigerson, Henry Small, Richie Zito
Breakin' Away	1983	Beat Street 2009 Reissue	Henry Small
Cadillac Club	1981	Small Change Reissue	Lindsay Mitchell
Comin' Home	1979	Armageddon	Steven Moyer, Robert Deans
Cover Girl	1980	All the Best From Prism	Lindsay Mitchell, Bryan Adams
Crime Wave	1978	See Forever Eyes	Lindsay Mitchell
Deception	1980	Young and Restless	Al Harlow
Dirty Mind	1983	Beat Street	Davitt Sigerson, Henry Small, Richie Zito
Don't Count Me Out	1983	Beat Street 2009 Reissue	William Kenneth McColl, Gary F. Wanstall
Don't Let Him Know	1981	Small Change	Bryan Adams, Jim Vallance
Don't Let Me Find Out	1976	B-side to pre-LP teaser single "I Ain't Lookin' Anymore", as "Stanley Screamer"	Lindsay Mitchell
Faces On A Train	1993	Jericho	Lindsay Mitchell
Fine	1983	Beat Street 2009 Reissue	Jamie Leigh
Flyin'	1978	See Forever Eyes	Al Harlow
Freewill	1977	Prism	Tom Lavin
Good To Be Back	1988	Over 60 Minutes With... Prism / Jericho	Al Harlow, Bryan Adams, Jim Vallance
Heart and Soul	1981	Small Change	Bruce Turgon
Hello	1978	See Forever Eyes	Clifford "Skip" Prest, William Kenneth McColl
Hideaway	1980	Young and Restless	Al Harlow
Hole in Paradise	1981	Small Change	Henry Small, Lindsay Mitchell
Hundred Years	2008	Big Black Sky	Al Harlow, Steve-O
I Ain't Lookin' Anymore	1976/1977	pre-LP teaser single "I Ain't Lookin' Anymore", as "Stanley Screamer" / Prism	Lindsay Mitchell
I Don't Want to Want You Anymore	1983	Beat Street	Henry Small, Richie Zito
(I'm Only) Half A Man	1993	Jericho	Al Harlow, J. Parkes
In the Jailhouse Now	1981	Small Change	Jimmie Rodgers
Is He Better Than Me	1983	Beat Street	Davitt Sigerson, Richie Zito
It's Over	1977	Prism	Jim Vallance
Japanese Girl	1983	Beat Street 2009 Reissue	Herbert Bernstein, Andrew Racheck
Jealousy	1979	Armageddon	Lindsay Mitchell, Bryan Adams
Jericho	1993	Jericho	Jim Vallance, Lindsay Mitchell
Julie	1977	Prism	Jim Vallance
Just Like Me	1978	See Forever Eyes	Al Harlow, Lindsay Mitchell, Rocket Norton, John Hall, Ron Tabak
Last Time	2008	Big Black Sky	Jim Vallance
Lonely Town	1993	Jericho	Al Harlow
Mirror Man	1979	Armageddon	Lindsay Mitchell, John Hall
Modern Times	1983	Beat Street	Davitt Sigerson, Henry Small, Richie Zito
Nervous Breakdown	2008	Big Black Sky	Mario Roccuzzo
Nickels and Dimes	1978	See Forever Eyes	Al Harlow, Lindsay Mitchell
Nightmare	1983	Beat Street	Davitt Sigerson, Henry Small, Richie Zito
Night to Remember	1979	Armageddon	Lindsay Mitchell
N-N-N-No!	1978	See Forever Eyes	Jim Vallance
One Woman's Hero	2008	Big Black Sky	Al Harlow
Open Soul Surgery	1977	Prism	Jim Vallance, Hillary Knight
Out Of My Head	1993	Jericho	Al Harlow
Party Line	1980	Young and Restless	Lindsay Mitchell
Rain	1981	Small Change	Davitt Sigerson, Ned Albright, Odette Springer
The Rock	2008	Big Black Sky	Al Harlow
Rock Finale	2008	Big Black Sky	Al Harlow
Rock Overture	2008	Big Black Sky	Al Harlow
Runnin' For Cover	1980	Young and Restless	Rocket Norton, Timothy McHugh
Satellite	1980	Young and Restless	Al Harlow, Lindsay Mitchell
Say You Want Me	2008	Big Black Sky	Al Harlow, Steve-O
See Forever Eyes	1978	See Forever Eyes	Lindsay Mitchell, John Hall
Spaceship Superstar	1977	Prism	Jim Vallance
Speed Of Light	1993	Jericho	Al Harlow
Stand Up For Love	1993	Jericho	Jim Vallance, Rick Springfield
State of the Heart	1983	Beat Street	Davitt Sigerson, Henry Small, Richie Zito
Stay	1981	Small Change	Bryan Adams, Jim Vallance
Take It or Leave It	1979	Armageddon	Jim Vallance, Bryan Adams
Take Me Away	1978	See Forever Eyes	Al Harlow
Take Me to the Kaptin	1977	Prism	Jim Vallance
Tangiers	2008	Big Black Sky	Al Harlow, Steve-O
Trouble	1993	Jericho	Lindsay Mitchell
Try Me	2008	Big Black Sky	Al Harlow
Turn on Your Radar	1981	Small Change	Morgan Walker
Virginia	1979	Armageddon	Bruce Miller
The Visitor	1980	Young and Restless	Lindsay Mitchell
Vladivostok	1977	Prism	Jim Vallance
Way Of the World	1993	Jericho	Al Harlow
We Gotta Get Outta Here	1983	Beat Street 2009 Reissue	Ian H. Patterson
When Love Goes Wrong (You're Not Alone)	1981	Small Change	Henry Small
When Will I See You Again	1981	Small Change	Henry Small
(Who Put Those) Things In Your Head	1993	Jericho	Al Harlow
Wings of Your Love	1981	Small Change	Henry Small
Wired	1983	Beat Street	Davitt Sigerson, Henry Small, Richie Zito
Ya Bother Me	2008	Big Black Sky	Al Harlow
Young and Restless	1980	Young and Restless	Al Harlow, Lindsay Mitchell
You're Like the Wind	1978	See Forever Eyes	Jim Vallance
You're My Reason	1978	See Forever Eyes	Michael Koren
You Walked Away Again	1979	Armageddon	Bryan Adams

== Unreleased songs ==
Title	Year	Author(s)	Notes
Armageddon (Demo)	1979	Lindsay Mitchell	From the Armageddon sessions. Early version of the released song.
Can You Feel It?	1979	Rob Deans, Steve Moyer	From the Armageddon sessions.
Chance	1978	Jim Vallance	From the See Forever Eyes sessions.
Clown	1979	John Hall	From the Armageddon sessions.
Day to Day	1978		From the See Forever Eyes sessions.
Deep Freeze	1980		From the Young and Restless sessions.
Don’t Say No	1987	Randy Gabel, Laura Bishop	Originally performed by Prism in the late 1980s, sung by Darcy Deutsch.
Don’t Turn Me Away	1978	Bryan Adams, Jim Vallance	From the See Forever Eyes sessions.
Drones			Pre-recorded show opener, typically a prelude to Spaceship Superstar. Played live as of 2020.
Hold On	1979	Al Harlow	From the Armageddon sessions.
In It For Yourself	1978	Al Harlow	From the See Forever Eyes sessions. Available on Rocket Norton’s “Lost in Space” soundtrack.
It’s Over (Demo)	1977	Jim Vallance	Demo from the Prism sessions.
Jack Me	1977	Tom Lavin	Performed by Prism and sung by bassist Tom Lavin.
Lonely Town (Demo)	1978	Al Harlow	From the See Forever Eyes sessions. Originally sung by Ron Tabak. Later released on Jericho.
Mirror Man (Demo)	1979	John Hall	From the unreleased concept album envisioned by John Hall, "The Invincible Yang". Early version of the released song, with completely different lyrics.
Nervous Breakdown (Demo)	1978	Mario Roccuzzo	From the See Forever Eyes sessions. Later released on Big Black Sky.
Night to Remember (Demo)	1979	Lindsay Mitchell	From the Armageddon sessions. Early version of the released song.
Out of My Head (Demo)	1978	Al Harlow	From the See Forever Eyes sessions. Later released on Jericho
Prism Power	1970s		From the unreleased concept album envisioned by John Hall, "The Invincible Yang". Early version of Crime Wave with other inspiration from Al Harlow's solo song, Hip Shakin'.
Spaceship Superstar (Demo)	1977	Jim Vallance	From the Prism sessions. Early version of the released song.
Stay	1979	John Hall	From the Armageddon sessions. Not to be confused with the Adams/Vallance "Stay" from Small Change.
Taking A Chance on Love	1979	Lindsay Mitchell	From the Armageddon sessions.

Key
The title is a cover

== Remixes/alternate song versions ==
Title	Year	album	Author(s)
Dirty Mind (Alternate)	1983	Beat Street 2009 Reissue	Davitt Sigerson, Henry Small, Richie Zito
Don't Let Him Know (Re-Recorded)	2009	Don't Let Him Know (Re-Recorded)	Bryan Adams, Jim Vallance
Heart and Soul (Alternate)	1981	Small Change Reissue	Bruce Turgon
Is He Better Than Me (Alternate)	1983	Beat Street 2009 Reissue	Davitt Sigerson, Richie Zito
Modern Times (Alternate)	1983	Beat Street 2009 Reissue	Davitt Sigerson, Henry Small, Richie Zito
Rain (Alternate)	1981	Small Change Reissue	Davitt Sigerson, Ned Albright, Odette Springer
State of the Heart (Alternate)	1983	Beat Street 2009 Reissue	Davitt Sigerson, Henry Small, Richie Zito
Stay (Alternate)	1981	Small Change Reissue	Bryan Adams, Jim Vallance
Take Me to the Kaptin (Single)	1977	Take Me to the Kaptin - Single	Jim Vallance
When Will I See You Again (Alternate)	1981	Small Change Reissue	Henry Small

== Songs recorded and released by other artists ==
Title	Artist	Year	Album	Author(s)
Armageddon	Toque	2019	Never Enough	Lindsay Mitchell
Bad News Travels Fast	Randy Bachman	1996	Merge	Randy Bachman
Blue Collar	Richie Zito Project	2006	Avalon	Davitt Sigerson, Henry Small, Richie Zito
Don't Let Him Know	Cameron Dye	1987	The Goldmine - Soundtrack	Jim Vallance, Bryan Adams
Flyin'	The Authentics	2019	The Authentics - EP	Al Harlow
Is He Better Than Me	HYTS	1985	Looking from the Outside	Davitt Sigerson, Richie Zito
Is He Better Than Me	Richie Zito Project	2006	Avalon	Davitt Sigerson, Richie Zito
Jealousy	Bryan Adams	1981	You Want It You Got It	Lindsay Mitchell, Bryan Adams
Lonely Town	Al Harlow	2022	Now!	Al Harlow
Nightmare	Richie Zito Project	2006	Avalon	Davitt Sigerson, Henry Small, Richie Zito
Open Soul Surgery	April Wine	1985	Walking Through Fire	Jim Vallance, Bryan Adams, Hillary Knight
Open Soul Surgery	Ian Lloyd	1979	Goose Bumps/Love Stealer	Jim Vallance, Bryan Adams, Hillary Knight
See Forever Eyes	Parallel 49	2020	Single	John Hall, Lindsay Mitchell
Spaceship Superstar	Jaymz Bee and the Royal Jelly Orchestra	1995	Jaymz Bee and His Royal Jelly Orchestra	Jim Vallance
Take Me Away	Parallel 49	2022	Single	Al Harlow
Take Me to the Kaptin	Parallel 49	2020	Single	Jim Vallance
Way of the World	Al Harlow	2022	Now!	Al Harlow, Jim Vallance, Bryan Adams
Who Put Those Things in Your Head	The Authentics	2019	The Authentics - EP	Al Harlow

== Sources ==
- "Prism discography". Discogs.
- "Prism – Songs, Albums, Reviews, Bio & More". AllMusic.
- "Prism". The Canadian Encyclopedia. *
- "Prism". Prism official website.
