= List of songs written by Jim Vallance =

This is a list of songs written by Canadian songwriter Jim Vallance.

== Released songs ==
Title	Year	Album	Ensemble	Co-writer	Notes
"Amelia"	1977	Prism	Prism		
"Amelia Earhart"	1979	Rock n' Roll Nights	BTO	David Simmons	
"Boys Nite Out"	1984	The Blitz	Krokus	Bryan Adams, Fernando von Arb, Marc Storace	
"Die for You"	1991	Hey Stoopid	Alice Cooper	Alice Cooper, Nikki Sixx, Mick Mars	
"Don't Let Him Know"	1981	Small Change	Prism	Bryan Adams	
"Don't Turn Me Away"	1978	Single	Bryan Adams	Bryan Adams	
"Don't Ya Say It"	1980	Bryan Adams	Bryan Adams	Bryan Adams	
"Good to Be Back"	1988	Over 60 Minutes With... Prism	Prism	Al Harlow, Bryan Adams	
"Here She Comes Again"	1979	Rock n' Roll Nights	BTO	Jim Clench, Blair Thornton	
"Hidin' From Love"	1980	Bryan Adams	Bryan Adams	Bryan Adams, Eric Kagna	
"I'll Be There (When It's Over)"	1992	Time to Burn	Giant	Dann Huff, Terry Thomas	
"It's Over"	1977	Prism	Prism		
"Jamaica"	1979	Rock n' Roll Nights	BTO		
"Jericho"	1993	Jericho	Prism	Lindsay Mitchell	
"Julie"	1977	Prism	Prism		
"Last Time"	2008	Big Black Sky	Prism		Originally demoed in 1976
"Let Me Take You Dancing"	1978	Single	Bryan Adams	Bryan Adams	
"N-N-N-No!"	1978	See Forever Eyes	Prism		
"Open Soul Surgery"	1977	Prism	Prism	Hillary Knight	
"Remember"	1980	Bryan Adams	Bryan Adams	Bryan Adams	
"Rock and Roll Hell"	1979	Rock n' Roll Nights	BTO		
"Spaceship Superstar"	1977	Prism	Prism		
"Stand Up For Love"	1993	Jericho	Prism	Rick Springfield	
"State of Mind"	1980	Bryan Adams	Bryan Adams	Bryan Adams	
"Stay"	1981	Small Change	Prism	Bryan Adams	
"Take It or Leave It"	1979	Armageddon	Prism	Bryan Adams	
"Take Me to the Kaptin"	1977	Prism	Prism		
"Try to See It My Way"	1980	Bryan Adams	Bryan Adams	Bryan Adams	
"Vladivostok"	1977	Prism	Prism		
"Win Some Lose Some"	1980	Bryan Adams	Bryan Adams	Bryan Adams, Eric Kagna, Paul Dean	
"Without You"	1992	Time to Burn	Giant	Dann Huff, Mike Brignardello	
"You're Like the Wind"	1978	See Forever Eyes	Prism		
