= Over 60 Minutes with... Prism =

Compilation album by Prism
- Released: 1988
- Recorded: 1975–1988
- Genre: Rock
- Length: 72:07
- Label: Capitol

Prism chronology
Beat Street (1983)	Over 60 Minutes with... Prism (1988)	Jericho (1993)

Singles from Over 60 Minutes with... Prism
- 1. "Good to Be Back" Released: 1988

Professional ratings
Review scores
Source	Rating
AllMusic	3/5 stars

Over 60 Minutes with... Prism is the second compilation album by Canadian rock band Prism, released in 1988. Prism reformed in 1987 with original guitarist Lindsay Mitchell, drummer Rocket Norton, guitarist Al Harlow, and two brand new members, Darcy Deutsch on vocals and Andy Lorimer on keyboards; both formerly of Simon Kaos. Over 60 Minutes with... Prism achieved gold record status (in excess of 50,000 copies sold) in Canada.

== Track listing ==
1. "Good to Be Back" (Al Harlow, Jim Vallance, Bryan Adams) - 3:09
2. "Don't Let Him Know" (B. Adams, J. Vallance) - 3:10
3. "Cover Girl" (Lindsay Mitchell, B. Adams) - 2:55
4. "Young and Restless" (L. Mitchell, A. Harlow) - 3:28
5. "American Music" (L. Mitchell) - 3:32
6. "Armageddon" (L. Mitchell) - 7:45
7. "Virginia" (Bruce Miller) - 3:57
8. "You Walked Away Again" (B. Adams) - 3:39
9. "Mirror Man" (John Hall, L. Mitchell) - 5:31
10. "Night to Remember" (L. Mitchell) - 5:52
11. "See Forever Eyes" (J. Hall, L. Mitchell) - 5:09
12. "Flyin'" (A. Harlow) - 4:35
13. "Take Me Away" (A. Harlow) - 3:16
14. "It's Over" (J. Vallance) - 4:06
15. "Open Soul Surgery (J. Vallance, Hillary Knight) -3:51
16. "Take Me to the Kaptin" (J. Vallance) - 3:58
17. "Spaceship Superstar" (J. Vallance) - 4:08

== Personnel ==
Prism

- Lindsay Mitchell - guitar
- Tom Lavin - guitar on tracks 14 - 17
- Al Harlow - guitar, bass on tracks 1 - 13
- Rocket Norton - drums on tracks 1 - 13
- Jim Vallance - drums on tracks 14 - 17
- John Hall - keyboards on tracks 3 - 17
- Andy Lorimer - keyboards on track 1
- Ron Tabak - vocals on tracks 3 - 17
- Henry Small - vocals on track 2
- Darcy Deutsch - vocals on track 1

Production

- Tony Heron - illustration
- Rodney Bowes - art direction and design
- Bruce Fairbairn - producer on tracks 4 - 17
- John S. Carter - producer on tracks 2, 3

== Certifications ==
Region	Certification	Certified units/sales
Canada (Music Canada)	Gold	50,000^{^}
^{^} Shipments figures based on certification alone.
