= Live Tonite =

Live album by Prism
- Released: 1978
- Recorded: July 16, 1978
- Genre: Rock, AOR
- Length: 48:29
- Label: GRT
- Producer: Bruce Fairbairn, Prism

Prism chronology
See Forever Eyes (1978)	Live Tonite (1978)	Armageddon (1979)

Live Tonite is a live album recorded by Canadian rock band Prism in 1978 at Detroit's Royal Oak Music Theater. The album features songs from Prism's first two studio albums "Prism" and "See Forever Eyes". The album was originally released on a special blue vinyl LP as well as black vinyl LP.

== Track listing ==
1. "See Forever Eyes" (Lindsay Mitchell, John Hall) - 4:57
2. "Take Me to the Kaptin" (Jim Vallance) - 4:12
3. "Open Soul Surgery" (J. Vallance) - 4:20
4. "Freewill" (Tom Lavin) - 4:23
5. "Vladivostok" (J. Vallance) - 5:45
6. "You're Like The Wind" (J. Vallance) - 3:45
7. "Flyin'" (Al Harlow) - 6:01
8. "Nickels and Dimes" (L. Mitchell, A. Harlow) - 5:45
9. "Spaceship Superstar" (J. Vallance) - 4:17
10. "N-N-N-No!" (J. Vallance) - 3:47

== Personnel ==
Prism

- Lindsay Mitchell – lead guitar, backing vocals
- Ron Tabak – lead vocals
- John Hall – keyboards, backing vocals
- Al Harlow – bass, slide guitar, backing vocals
- Rocket Norton – drums

Horn Section

- Ralph Eppel — trombone
- Bruce Fairbairn — trumpet

Production

- Rolf Hennemann — Mixing Engineer
- Jerry Allen
- Arthur Stokes
- Allen Stoles
- John Naskicwicz

Prism Road Crew

- George Lambert — sound
- Jean Laloge — stage coordination
- Brock Woodman — lights
