= All the Best from Prism =

Compilation album by Prism
- Released: December 1980
- Recorded: 1976–1980
- Genre: Rock
- Length: 48:22
- Label: Capitol
- Producer: John S. Carter

Prism chronology
| Young and Restless (1980) | All the Best from Prism (1980) | Small Change (1981) |

Singles from All the Best from Prism
- 1. "Cover Girl" Released: 1980

Professional ratings
Review scores
| Source | Rating |
|---|---|
| AllMusic | 3/5 stars |

All the Best from Prism is the first compilation album by Canadian rock band Prism, released in December 1980. The album features the band's greatest hits as well as a new song, "Cover Girl", which failed to chart in both Canada and the U.S. In 1981, All the Best from Prism was certified platinum in Canada (in excess of 100,000 copies sold).

== Track listing ==
1. "Spaceship Superstar" (Jim Vallance) – 4:05
2. "Take Me to the Kaptin" (Vallance) – 3:55
3. "It's Over" (Vallance) – 4:01
4. "Flyin'" (Al Harlow) – 4:30
5. "Take Me Away" (Harlow) – 3:12
6. "See Forever Eyes" (John Hall, Lindsay Mitchell) – 5:05
7. "Cover Girl" (Mitchell, Bryan Adams) – 2:52
8. "Night to Remember" (Mitchell) – 5:46
9. "Virginia" (Bruce Miller) – 3:53
10. "Young & Restless" (Mitchell, Harlow) – 3:24
11. "Armageddon" (Mitchell) – 7:39

== Personnel ==
Prism

- Ron Tabak – lead vocals
- Lindsay Mitchell – lead guitar
- Allen Harlow – bass guitar, guitar
- Rocket Norton – drums
- John Hall – keyboards

Production

- David Elliot – art direction
- Shun Sasabuchi – photography, art direction
- Bruce Allen – management
- John Carter – producer on "Cover Girl"
- Bruce Fairbairn – producer on all tracks except "Cover Girl"

== Charts ==
| Chart (1980–81) | Peak position |
|---|---|
| Canada Top Albums/CDs (RPM) | 46 |

== Certifications ==
| Region | Certification | Certified units/sales |
|---|---|---|
| Canada (Music Canada) | Platinum | 100,000^{^} |
^{^} Shipments figures based on certification alone.
