= Beat Street (album) =

Studio album by Prism
- Released: July 1983
- Recorded: 1982–1983
- Studios: Sunset Sound (Hollywood); Studio C Capitol
- Genres: Rock; pop rock
- Label: Capitol
- Producer: John S. Carter

Prism chronology
Small Change (1981)	Beat Street (1983)	Over 60 Minutes with... Prism (1988)

Prism studio album chronology
Small Change (1981)	Beat Street (1983)	Jericho (1993)

Beat Street is the sixth studio album by Canadian rock band Prism, released in July 1983 by Capitol Records, two years after Prism's successful studio album, Small Change (1981). It was the last of two Prism studio albums featuring lead vocalist Henry Small, who had replaced Ron Tabak after his forced departure in 1981. It features high-profile guest backing vocalists, including the Eagles' Timothy B. Schmit, Toto's Bobby Kimball and Chicago's Bill Champlin. The album is notably the band's first album not to feature their guitarist and founding member Lindsay Mitchell. The album was their last recording of original material until they officially reformed in 1987–88. In that line-up of the band, Small was replaced by Darcy Deutsch.

Beat Street is more of a solo album by Henry Small than a Prism album as it features no other members of the band apart from guitarist Paul Warren, and it relies heavily on session musicians. The album was the last recording of original material under Prism's name until they officially reformed in 1987–88. They reformed without Small, who was working on Who bassist John Entwistle's solo album The Rock which featured Small singing the lead vocals on all of its eleven tracks.

Beat Street was received negatively by the majority of music critics and it was also a commercial disappointment, failing to reach the Billboard Top 200 and peaked outside the chart at No. 202. However, Prism found some success with the single "I Don't Want to Want You Anymore." This single received quite a lot of radio airplay and peaked at No. 37 on the Mainstream Rock Tracks chart, Prism's last single (to date) to do so. Beat Street also peaked at No. 90 on the Canadian Top Albums chart (RPM).

The album was re-issued in January 2009 on Renaissance in the United States as a digitally remastered CD, featuring rare bonus content. The reissue comprised 18-tracks. It included the original album digitally remastered from the original 1/2" mix tapes; alongside five outtakes, and four alternate versions of the songs featured on the album.

== Background ==
The original members of Prism had already left by the time the album was being recorded. The band's manager Bruce Allen owned the name and a new band was built around Small. However, Allen had a falling out with the president of EMI Records at the time over the management of Tom Cochrane. Suddenly the album, which at that point had been charting all over the east coast of the US, was basically pulled by Capitol. Small had put a touring band together, but Allen called and said the tour was cancelled. Soon afterward Prism was dropped from the label, and the band broke up.

== Critical reception ==
Professional ratings
Review scores
Source	Rating
AllMusic	1.5/5 stars

Reviewing for AllMusic critic Mike DeGagne wrote that the album "contains none of Prism's past arena rock charm or instrumental stamina." adding that "The tracks are watered-down attempts at playing pop/rock with lyrics that sound as if they've been written overnight." He also claimed that "Without John Hall behind the keyboards or Tabak's singing, Prism just wasn't Prism anymore."

== Track listing ==
All tracks are written by Davitt Sigerson, Henry Small, and Richie Zito, except where noted.

Side one
No.	Title	Length
1.	"Nightmare"	4:26
2.	"Beat Street"	4:21
3.	"Dirty Mind"	3:32
4.	"Modern Times"	3:55

Side two
No.	Title	Writer(s)	Length
5.	"Is He Better Than Me"	Davitt Sigerson; Richie Zito	3:19
6.	"Blue Collar"		3:15
7.	"Wired"		3:48
8.	"State of the Heart"		3:09
9.	"I Don't Want to Want You Anymore"	Henry Small; Zito	4:17

Bonus tracks on the 2009 reissue
No.	Title	Writer(s)	Length
10.	"Fine"	Jamie Leigh	4:07
11.	"We Gotta Get Outta Here"	(unknown)	4:17
12.	"Don't Count Me Out"	W.K. McColl; G.F. Wanstall	3:36
13.	"Modern Times" [Alternate Version] [Alternate Take]"		5:27
14.	"Dirty Mind" [Alternate Version] [Alternate Take]"		3:34
15.	"Breakin' Away"	Small	3:33
16.	"Japanese Girl"	Herbert Bernstein; Andrew Racheck	4:34
17.	"State of the Heart" [Alternate Version] [Alternate Take]"		3:06
18.	"Is He Better Than Me?" [Alternate Version] [Alternate Take]"		3:18

== Personnel ==
Credits are adapted from the album's liner notes.

Prism

- Henry Small – lead and background vocals
- Paul Warren – guitars

Additional musicians

- Richie Zito – guitars; backing vocals
- Mike Baird – drums; percussion
- Dennis Bellfield – bass guitar
- Alan Pasqua – keyboards
- Jimmy Phillips – keyboards
- Michael Tempo – percussion
- Timothy B. Schmit – backing vocals
- Bill Champlin – backing vocals
- Bobby Kimball – backing vocals

Production and artwork

- John S. Carter – producer
- Warren Dewey – engineer
- Gene Wooley – assistant engineer
- Richard "Beef" McKernan – assistant engineer
- Wally Traugott – mastering
- Bill Burks – art direction
- Andy Engel – design
- Ron Slenzak – photography

== Charts ==
Chart (1983)	Peak position
Canada Top Albums/CDs (RPM)	90
US AOR/Albums (Radio & Records)	27
