= Henry Small (singer) =

American singer-songwriter

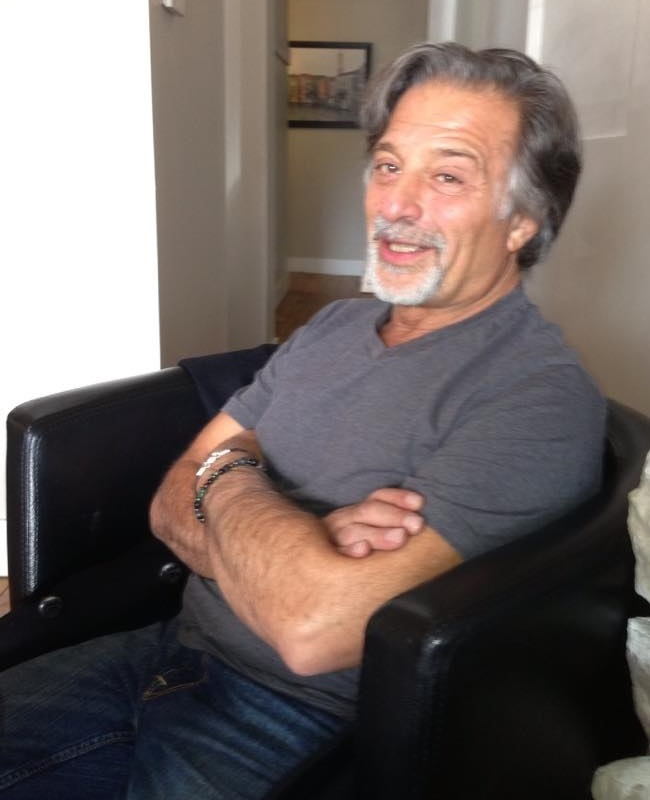
- Small in 2015

Background information
- Born: Henry Cave Small; February 29, 1948 (age 78); Beacon, New York, U.S.
- Genres: Rock; pop rock; soft rock; glam metal
- Occupations: Singer; songwriter; composer; multi-instrumentalist; radio personality
- Instruments: Vocals; violin; brass; mandolin
- Years active: 1960s–present
- Labels: Small World Studios; Capitol
- Formerly of: Prism; Scrubbaloe Caine; Small Wonder; The Gainsborough Gallery; The Group
- Website: henrysmall.ca

Henry Cave Small (born February 29, 1948) is an American-Canadian singer, songwriter, composer, multi-instrumentalist and radio personality. In a career spanning more than 50 years, Small has been a member of five rock bands: Prism, Scrubbaloe Caine, Small Wonder, the Gainsborough Gallery, and the Group.

With Prism, Small enjoyed some success in the early 1980s. His first studio album with the band was Small Change (1981). It was the band's most commercially successful studio album on the U.S. Billboard 200, being their first and only album to make the Top 100. The lead single, "Don't Let Him Know", co-written by Jim Vallance with Bryan Adams, became Prism's first and only Top 40 hit in the U.S. It went on to peak at number one on the Billboard Mainstream Rock Tracks chart in 1982, and stayed in the charts for just over four months. Their follow-up studio album, Beat Street (1983) however, was more of a solo album by Small than a Prism album as it features no founding members of the band and relied heavily on session musicians. After Prism broke up in 1984, Small worked with the Who's bass guitarist John Entwistle, singing all of the lead vocals on his sixth solo studio album The Rock which was released ten years after it was first recorded, in 1996. He has also worked with Eddie Money, Doug Cox, and Richie Zito.

Small pursued a solo career and released his debut studio album Time in 2002. From 1993 to 2018, he worked as a morning radio personality at CIFM-FM in Kamloops, British Columbia, Canada.

== Early life ==
Henry Cave Small was born on February 29, 1948, in Beacon, New York. He learned how to play the violin at an early age, but in high school discovered other kinds of music. He was bullied as a child because of his height, which led to confrontations.

== Musical career ==
=== 1966–1969: The Group ===
Small was lead vocalist of a rock band performing in clubs and events in Potsdam, New York and Brasher Falls, New York while a student of Crane School of Music, SUNY Potsdam.

=== 1971–1975: Scrubbaloe Caine ===
From 1970–1975, Small was a member of the Canadian band Scrubbaloe Caine. Other members included Paul Dean later of Loverboy, and the band was produced by David Kershenbaum from RCA Records. The band released one studio album, Round One in 1973. They broke-up in 1975, after being unable to find a new recording contract.

=== 1976–1977: Small Wonder ===
In 1976, Small formed the band Small Wonder with Jimmy Phillips, Jerry Morin, and William King. They released their debut studio album, Small Wonder, in the same year. In 1977, they released their second studio album, Growin'. Small Wonder brought Small a three-year songwriting contract with Irving Almo Music. During this period, he made a guest appearance on Burt Sugarman's late-night musical variety series The Midnight Special.

=== 1981–1984: Prism ===
From 1981–84, Small was a member of the rock band Prism. As the band was preparing to record their follow-up studio album to Young and Restless (1980) in the summer of 1981, lead vocalist Ron Tabak was fired. Various reasons cited were his conflicts with other band members, several run-ins with the law, and a lack of songwriting ability. Around the same time, keyboardist John Hall left the band. Small was brought in, and the new four-piece line-up of Small, guitarist Lindsay Mitchell, bassist Al Harlow, and drummer Rocket Norton recorded the studio album Small Change, which was released later in 1981. The first track on the album "Don't Let Him Know", written by Jim Vallance (using his real name, as opposed to the Rodney Higgs moniker he often used in his earlier work with the band) and Bryan Adams, became Prism's first Top 40 hit in the US and a number-one single on Billboard's new Top Rock Tracks chart. Their follow-up single "Turn On Your Radar" also charted, becoming their fifth and final song to chart in the U.S.

By the end of the tour for Small Change, Mitchell, Harlow and Norton had individually left Prism. With Mitchell's departure, Prism now had no founding members left.

In 1982, the band's touring line-up was Small, guitarist Paul Warren, bassist John Trivers, keyboardist Robyn Robbins, and Doug Maddick on drums. Although the band had essentially broken up by the end of 1982, Small decided to continue recording as a solo artist but using the Prism name. He assembled a group of session musicians including Richie Zito, Alan Pasqua, Mike Baird with backing vocalists such as Bill Champlin of Chicago, Bobby Kimball of Toto and Timothy B. Schmit of Poco, and the Eagles to assist him. Together, this ad hoc line-up released the studio album Beat Street under the Prism name in 1983. It was received negatively by the majority of music critics and it was also a commercial disappointment; failing to reach the Billboard Top 200 and peaked outside the chart at No. 202. However, Prism found some success with the single "I Don't Want to Want You Anymore." This single received quite a lot of radio airplay and peaked at No. 37 on the Mainstream Rock Tracks chart, Prism's last single (to date) to do so.

Small, who was by then the band's only member, was dropped from his label, and essentially retired from using the Prism name in early 1984, and the 'band' became defunct. Until it reformed without his participation.

=== 1985–present ===
In 1996, John Entwistle, bass guitarist for the Who, released his sixth solo studio album titled The Rock. This was his only solo album on which he did not sing any of the lead vocals, a role filled instead by Small. The album was actually recorded over an 18-month period in 1985 at Entwistle's Hammerhead Studios in Gloucestershire, England and was meant to be released by WEA. Legal issues kept it in the vaults for ten years, and the album was then released in four different editions between 1996 and 2005, with separate covers for each. AllMusic wrote of the album "There's no questioning the technical skill of the performances—this band sounds tight and expert throughout, and Entwistle and [Zak] Starkey are a mighty rhythm section.

== Discography ==
- The Gainsborough Gallery — Life Is a Song (1970)
- Scrubbaloe Caine — Round One (1973)
- Small Wonder — Small Wonder (1976)
- Small Wonder — Growin’ (1977)
- Prism — Small Change (1981)
- Prism — Beat Street (1983)
- John Entwistle — The Rock (1996)
- Henry Small — Time (2002)
