= Feeding Like Butterflies =

Canadian folk-rock/Celtic music group

Feeding Like Butterflies' is a Canadian folk-rock/Celtic music group from Edmonton. Their songs have been featured on Dawson's Creek and a number of Roger Corman movies, among other outlets. The band's style has been compared to Jethro Tull.

== History ==
Feeding Like Butterflies was founded in the early 1990s by lead vocalist and songwriter Jason O. Johnson, who is also a Film/TV Actor Founding members of the group included bassist Troy Johnson (brother to Jason), Cellist Martin Johann Kloppers, keyboardist/accordionist Doran Chandler, guitarist/mandolinist Mike Sanders, and drummer Darren Carter. Later versions of the band included guitarist/mandolinist Ken Drolet, Andy Waitkus, Ralph Bently, drummer Greg Pretty, Derek Loewen, Jason Sound, Thom Golub and keyboardist/accordionist Rob Thompson. Post band touring, Johnson became involved in acting in voice and on screen, most notably as LIPPY in the critically acclaimed PHOBIES game series. Johnson is also credited as an experimental periphery hardware designer for Playstation and Xbox in creating the FRAGFX and MotionFx controllers in the early 2000’s.

The group's first album, John in his Earth Suit, was recorded in Edmonton at Anvil Recording in 1993. That same year, the band was signed to S.L. Feldman and Associates/Bruce Allen (band manager) and performed shows with Crash Test Dummies, Jann Arden and Moxy Früvous.

A video single release of the song "Mexicalli Midbender", which featured singer Johnson hanging from a helicopter in a straight jacket, reached Top 10 rotation on Canada's video channel Much Music.

In 1994, Feeding Like Butterflies won an Alberta Music Award as best alternative artist for the EP cassette Once A Farm, Always A Cow. The album also won the best album design award. In 1995, the band was nominated for an Alberta Music Award as Group Recording Artists of the Year. FLB released a concept album, John in his Earthsuit (Fall 1995), which received ARIA awards for Best Alternative Album, Best Album Design and Peoples Choice Awards.

In 1998, Feeding Like Butterflies released their fourth and final album, Inside the Medicine Man, through Fen-Urim Music The album was a mix of folk, rock and world music.

The band toured Canada extensively performing roughly 500 concerts during the 1990s in arenas, theatres, folk festivals and universities across North America. FLB crossed all genres performing alongside folk artists such as Alro Guthrie, Buddy Guy and Spirit of the West, to rock stages with the likes of Nickelback and 54-40. Feeding Like Butterflies last known live performance was as the headline act of the 2001 North Country Fair Festival.

== Discography ==
- John In His Earthsuit (1995)
- Siamese Tongue and Cat Singles (1996)
- World Travel Collection (1996)
- Inside the Medicine Man (1998)
