= Small Change (Prism album) =

Studio album by Prism
- Released: December 1981
- Recorded: Summer 1981
- Studio: Ocean Way Recording
- Genre: Rock; adult contemporary; pop rock; arena rock; soft rock
- Length: 34:48
- Label: Capitol
- Producer: John S. Carter

Prism chronology
All the Best from Prism (1980)	Small Change (1981)	Beat Street (1983)

Prism studio album chronology
Young and Restless (1980)	Small Change (1981)	Beat Street (1983)

Singles from Small Change
- 1. "Don't Let Him Know" Released: 1981; 2. "Turn On Your Radar" Released: 1981; 3. "Rain" Released: 1981

Small Change is the fifth studio album by Canadian rock band Prism, released in December 1981 by Capitol Records. It was the first of two Prism studio albums with lead vocalist Henry Small, who had replaced Ron Tabak after his forced departure and the last studio album to feature guitarist and founding member Lindsay Mitchell. The album is generally regarded as the genesis of the smoother, more adult-oriented sound of the band's later work. The album peaked at No. 53 on the Billboard 200.

On release, the album was received favorably by the majority of music critics, although it was criticized for being too commercial. This was a departure from the band's early arena rock roots and opinions became much more negative in subsequent decades. Regardless of the criticism, Small Change became Prism's most commercially successful studio album on the Billboard 200 and it was their first and only album to the make the Top 100. The lead single, "Don't Let Him Know", inspired by the Kim Carnes song "Bette Davis Eyes", was written by Jim Vallance, using his real name instead of the pseudonym Rodney Higgs that he used on previous Prism studio albums, and Bryan Adams. It became Prism's first and only Top 40 hit in the US and went on to peak at number one on the Billboard Mainstream Rock Tracks chart in 1982. It stayed in the charts for just over four months. The follow-up single, "Turn On Your Radar", was their fifth and final single to chart, peaking at No. 64 on the Billboard Hot 100. Small Change went on to achieve Gold status in Canada (in excess of 50,000 copies sold).

== Cover artwork ==
The album cover depicts Norman Rockwell's 1954 painting, Girl at Mirror. Additionally, the single releases of the songs "Don't Let Him Know" and "Turn On Your Radar" used the same image of the painting.

== Background ==
As the band were thinking about recording their follow-up to the poorly received commercial disappointment Young and Restless in December 1980, Ron Tabak was fired. Various reasons have been cited, including his conflicts with other band members, several run-ins with the law and/or a lack of songwriting ability. A new lead vocalist Henry Small was brought in and the new four-piece line-up (Small/Mitchell/Harlow/Norton) recorded the album Small Change in the summer of 1981, which was released later in the year. Keyboardist John Hall departed the band early on during the sessions for the album.

By the beginning of 1982, Mitchell, Harlow and Norton had left Prism. With Mitchell's departure, Prism now had no original members left.

== Critical reception ==
Professional ratings
Review scores
Source	Rating
AllMusic	3/5 stars

Reviewing retrospectively for AllMusic, critic Mike DeGagne wrote of the album "Prism substituted its vigorous rock & roll sound for a more refined blend of soft rock amiability, which paid off to some extent." He added that "The vocals are toned down, the extravagance of the horns and synthesizers are absent and the songs reflect a more adult-oriented feel."

== Track listing ==
Side one
No.	Title	Writer(s)	Length
1.	"Don't Let Him Know"	Bryan Adams; James Vallance	3:09
2.	"Turn On Your Radar"	Morgan Walker	3:14
3.	"Hole in Paradise"	Henry Small; Lindsay Mitchell	3:25
4.	"Rain"	Davitt Sigerson; Ned Albright; Odette Springer	4:05
5.	"When Will I See You Again"	Small	3:35

Side two
No.	Title	Writer(s)	Length
6.	"Heart and Soul"	Bruce Turgon	3:35
7.	"Stay"	Adams; Vallance	3:31
8.	"When Love Goes Wrong (You're Not Alone)"	Small	3:30
9.	"In the Jailhouse Now"	Jimmy Rodgers	3:03
10.	"Wings of Your Love"	Small	3:41
Total length:			34:48

== Personnel ==
Credits are adapted from the Small Change liner notes.

Prism

- Henry Small – lead vocals
- Lindsay Mitchell – guitar
- Rocket Norton – drums
- Al Harlow – bass guitar

Additional musicians

- Jimmy Phillips – keyboards
- Randy Hansen – guitar
- Norton Buffalo – harmonica
- Alvin Taylor – drums, percussion
- Reggie McBride – bass guitar
- Don Francisco – backing vocals
- Shirley Matthews – backing vocals
- Paulette Brown – backing vocals
- Cleopatra Kennedy – backing vocals

Production and artwork

- John S. Carter – producer
- Warren Dewey – engineer
- Roy Kohara – art direction
- James O'Mara – photography

== Charts ==
Chart (1982)	Peak position
US Billboard 200	53

== Certifications ==
Region	Certification	Certified units/sales
Canada (Music Canada)	Gold	50,000^{^}
^{^} Shipments figures based on certification alone.
