= Stick It in Your Ear =

Studio album by Paul Laine
- Released: 13 April 1990
- Recorded: 1989
- Genre: Hard rock, arena rock
- Label: Elektra Records
- Producer: Bruce Fairbairn

Paul Laine chronology
Stick It in Your Ear (1990)	Can't Get Enuff (1996)

Singles from Stick It in Your Ear
- 1. "Dorianna" Released: March 1990; 2. "Is It Love" Released: November 1990

Professional ratings
Review scores
Source	Rating
Allmusic	3/5 stars

Stick It in Your Ear is Paul Laine's debut album, released on 13 April 1990, through Elektra Records. It includes the song "Dorianna" as a single, that peaked #76 on 7 April 1990. The second single, "Is It Love", peaked #93 on 17 November 1990.

== Track listing ==
No.	Title	Length
1.	"One Step Over the Line"	7:06
2.	"We Are the Young"	5:03
3.	"Dorianna"	5:17
4.	"Is It Love"	4:09
5.	"Heart of America"	4:45
6.	"Main Attraction"	4:36
7.	"Doin' Time"	5:24
8.	"I'll Be There"	5:58
9.	"Break Down the Barricades"	3:41

=== Bonus tracks (2011 re-release) ===
No.	Title	Length
10.	"My Hometown"	4:45
11.	"Only Your Heart"	4:29
12.	"Keep on Running"	4:24
13.	"After the Rain"	5:28

== Personnel ==
- Paul Laine - vocals, guitars, keyboards, piano
- Kenny Kaos - guitars
- Paul Gogo - keyboards, backing vocals
- John Webster - keyboards
- Scott Brown - bass, backing vocals
- Rene Worst - bass, fretless bass
- Pat Steward - drums
- Mickey Curry - drums
- Bruce Fairbairn - piano
