= Bryan Adams (album) =

Studio album by Bryan Adams
- Released: 12 February 1980
- Recorded: November 1979
- Studios: Manta Sound (Toronto, Ontario); Pinewood Studios (Vancouver, British Columbia)
- Genre: Rock
- Length: 31:11
- Label: A&M
- Producers: Bryan Adams; Jim Vallance

Bryan Adams chronology
| Bryan Adams (1980) | You Want It You Got It (1981) |

Singles from Bryan Adams
- 1. "Hidin' from Love" Released: March 24, 1980; 2. "Give Me Your Love" Released: July 14, 1980

Professional ratings
Review scores
| Source | Rating |
|---|---|
| AllMusic | 2.5/5 stars |
| The Encyclopedia of Popular Music | 3/5 stars |
| The Rolling Stone Album Guide | 3/5 stars |

Bryan Adams is the debut solo studio album by Canadian singer-songwriter Bryan Adams, after previously being the lead vocalist of Canadian hard rock band Sweeney Todd. The album was released in February 1980 by A&M Records. "Hidin' from Love" reached number 64 and "Give Me Your Love" reached number 91 on Canada's RPM 100 Singles chart.

== Production and release ==
In early 1978, Bryan Adams teamed up with Jim Vallance (formerly of Canadian band Prism) to form a songwriting duo. A&M Records signed the pair as songwriters, not long before signing Adams as a recording artist. He worked on the debut album for the balance of 1979 with it being released on 12 February 1980.

The first single was "Hidin' from Love" in 1980, peaked at number 43 on the Billboard dance charts, which was followed up by "Give Me Your Love" and "Remember". Although the album never received any US notoriety on its debut, it was the door opener that led to getting radio play, tours, management, agents and the music business in general, interested in the 20-year-old songwriter.

The first tour was across Canada playing clubs and colleges. It was during this time that Adams developed the songs for the US breakthrough album You Want It You Got It (1981).

== Track listing ==
All tracks are written by Bryan Adams and Jim Vallance, except where noted.

Side one
| No. | Title | Writer(s) | Length |
|---|---|---|---|
| 1. | "Hidin' from Love" | Adams; Vallance; Eric Kagna | 3:17 |
| 2. | "Win Some, Lose Some" | Adams; Vallance; Kagna; Paul Dean | 3:47 |
| 3. | "Wait and See" | Adams; Allee Willis | 3:05 |
| 4. | "Give Me Your Love" | Adams | 2:54 |
| 5. | "Wastin' Time" | Adams | 3:34 |

Side two
| No. | Title | Length |
|---|---|---|
| 6. | "Don't Ya Say It" | 3:21 |
| 7. | "Remember" | 3:41 |
| 8. | "State of Mind" | 3:15 |
| 9. | "Try to See It My Way" | 4:03 |
| Total length: | | 31:11 |

2012 Japanese SHM-CD bonus track
| No. | Title | Length |
|---|---|---|
| 10. | "Remember" (from Live at the Budokan) | 3:49 |
| Total length: | | 34:58 |

== Personnel ==
- Bryan Adams – vocals, guitars, piano, producer
- Jim Vallance – keyboards, guitars, bass, drums, producer

Guest musicians

- Peter Bjerring
- Marek Norman
- Jeff Baxter
- Jim Clench
- David Hungate
- Tom Szczesniak
- Fred Turner
- Dick Smith
- Gene Meros
- Colina Phillips
- Sharon Lee Williams

Production

- Hayward Parrott – recording
- Alan Perkins – additional recording
- Geoff Turner – additional recording
- Joe Laux – recording assistant
- Paul MacDonald – recording assistant
- Gene Meros – recording assistant
- Dave Taylor – recording assistant
- Bob Schaper – mixing
- Mike Reese – mastering
- Sunset Sound (Hollywood, California) – mixing location
- The Mastering Lab (Hollywood, California) – mastering location
- Chuck Beeson – art direction, design
- Mark Hanauer – photography

== Charts ==
Weekly chart positions for Bryan Adams
| Chart (1980) | Peak position |
|---|---|
| Canadian Albums (RPM) | 69 |

== Notable cover versions ==
- In 1981, former Fleetwood Mac frontman Bob Welch covered "Remember" on his 1981 self-titled solo album.
- In 1982, "Hidin' from Love" and "Remember" were covered by the British group Rosetta Stone. Their version of "Hidin' from Love" reached No. 46 on Canada's RPM 100 Singles chart.
