= Jericho (Prism album) =

- Cover Graphics by John Rummen.

Studio album by Prism
- Released: June 1993
- Recorded: 1988–1993
- Genre: Rock
- Length: 49:58
- Label: Spinner Music Group
- Producer: Prism

Prism chronology
Over 60 Minutes with... Prism (1988)	Jericho (1993)	Best of Prism (1996)

Jericho is the seventh studio album by Canadian rock band Prism. It was originally released in 1993. Most of the tracks were recorded in 1993, however the songs "Good to Be Back" and "Way of the World" were recorded and released as a single in 1988 after the group reformed. The album was recorded and mixed at "Mushroom Studios" in Vancouver, except for tracks #2 and #3 which were recorded by Jim Vallance at "Distorto Studios" in Vancouver.

== Composition ==
- The songs "(Who Put Those) Things In Your Head", "Lonely Town" and "Out of My Head" were written by Al Harlow and recorded in 1978 for the See Forever Eyes sessions and were originally sung by former singer, the late Ron Tabak, however they were never released on an album until 15 years later.
- The songs "Good To Be Back" and "Way of World" were co-written by Al Harlow, Jim Vallance and Bryan Adams in 1988 after Prism reformed. "Good To Be Back" was released as a single in 1988.

== Track listing ==
All songs written by Al Harlow unless otherwise noted.

1. "Speed of Light" – 4:37
2. "Good to Be Back" (A. Harlow, Jim Vallance, Bryan Adams) – 3:09
3. "Way of the World" – 3:42
4. "Stand Up for Love" (J. Vallance, Rick Springfield)- 4:34
5. "Trouble" (Lindsay Mitchell) – 5:06
6. "Jericho" (J. Vallance, L. Mitchell)– 2:32
7. "Out of My Head" – 4:32
8. "(I'm Only) Half a Man"(A. Harlow, J. Parkes) – 3:56
9. "(Who Put Those) Things in Your Head" – 4:14
10. "Lonely Town" – 3:15
11. "Bad News (Travels Fast)" (Randy Bachman) – 4:05
12. "Faces on a Train" (L. Mitchell) – 5:54

== Personnel ==
Prism

- Lindsay Mitchell – lead guitar, electric 12-string & acoustic guitars, talker guitar, backing vocals
- Darcy Deutsch – lead vocals
- Andy Lorimer – keyboards, backing vocals
- Al Harlow – bass, electric 12-string, 6-string, bow, backwards & slide guitars, backing vocals
- Rocket Norton – drums

Guest musicians

- John Cody
- Dave Steele
- Jim Vallance
- Bryan Adams
- Jamie Meyer
- Paul Janz
- Marc Lafrance

Production

- Rolf Henneman
- Pete Wonsiak – 2nd engineer
- Keith Stein
- Jim Vallance
- Craig Waddell
- Ralph Alfonso – photography and design
