= Royal Oak Music Theatre =

Music venue

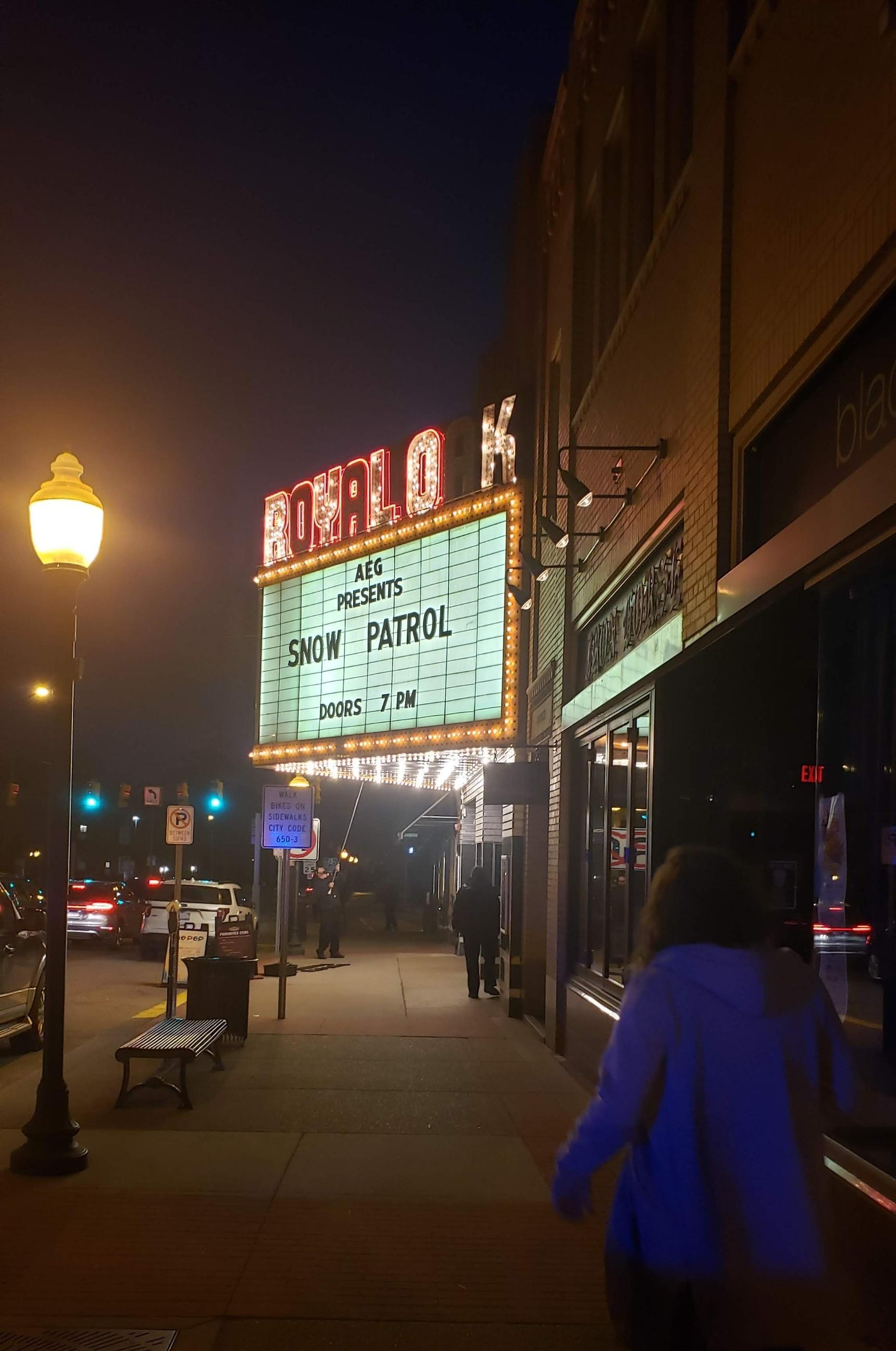
- Marquee sign at the lobby entrance
- Interactive map of Royal Oak Music Theatre
- Address: 318 W. Fourth Street; Royal Oak, Michigan; United States
- Coordinates: 42.4873°N 83.1474°W
- Owner: Worldwide Entertainment, LLC
- Operator: AEG Live
- Capacity: 1,700
- Current use: Music venue

Construction
- Opened: 1928

Website
- www.royaloakmusictheatre.com

Royal Oak Music Theatre is a music venue located at 318 W. Fourth Street, Royal Oak, Michigan. It was built as a vaudeville theatre and opened in 1928.

== History and usage ==
The theater opened in 1928 by entrepreneur John H. Kunsky. Originally opening to serve as a movie theater, in 1976, the theater that had now been closed, was reopened as a concert and comedy venue by Detroit native and concert promoter Paul Stanley of PS Productions. The very first concert was Maria Muldaur and Martin Mull on April 3, 1976. The second concert was billed as 'The Martins are coming' starred Martin Mull and Steve Martin for $5.50 a ticket, and the third concert featured a new act; Hall & Oates. In July 1978 Prism recorded a live album, “Live Tonite”, at the theatre during one of their shows.

It was privately owned until being purchased in 2004 by Worldwide Entertainment, LLC, then Off Broadway and musicals were brought as forms of entertainment into the venue. AEG Live began operating the theatre in 2007.

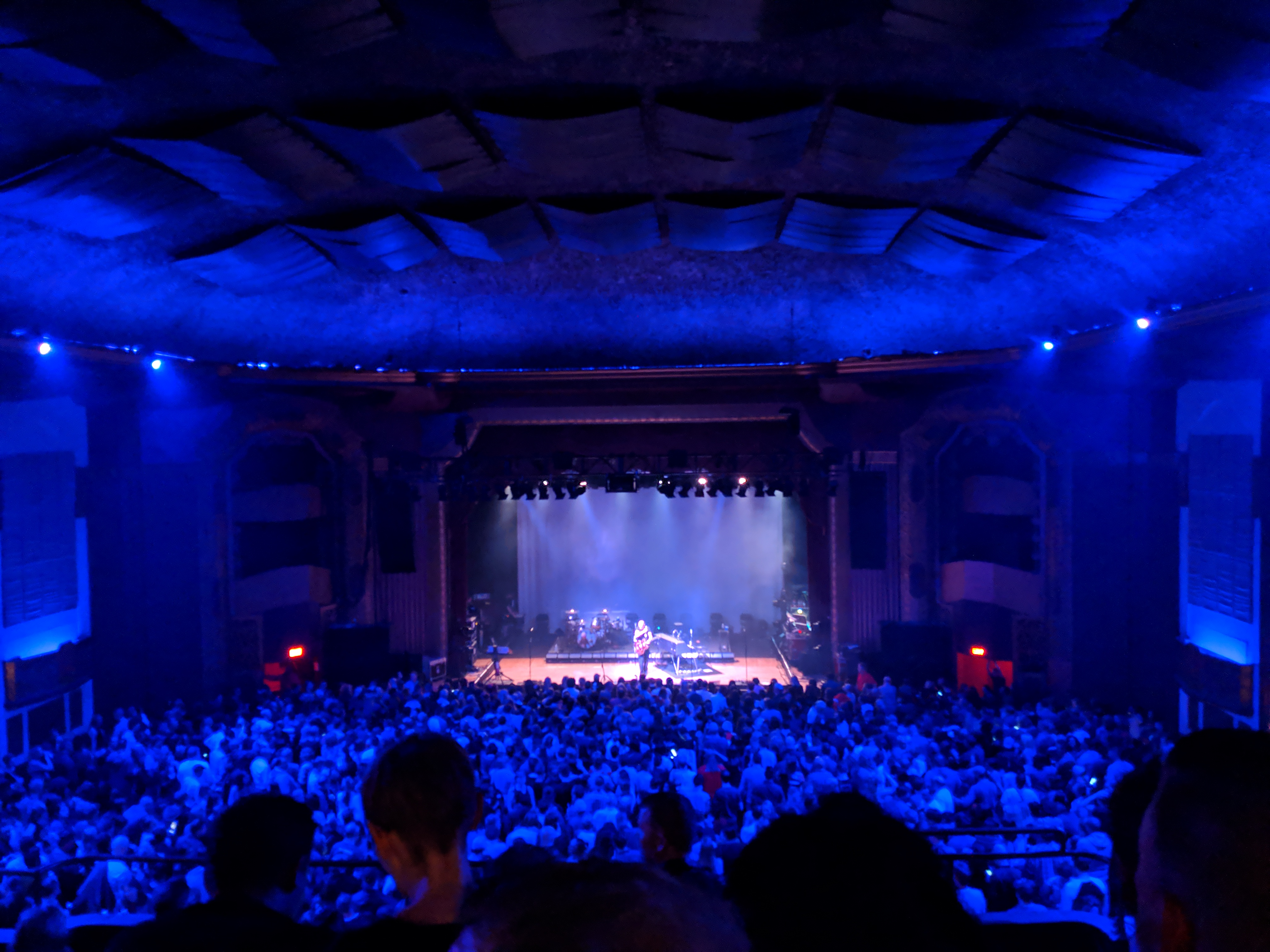
View from mezzanine

== Capacity ==
There are three set ups available at the theater with a maximum capacity of 1700; general admission, cabaret, and theatre. General admission holds up to 1700 patrons, cabaret holds 782, seating 562 on the main floor and 200 in the mezzanine, and the theatre set up holds 1000, 718 on the floor and 282 in the mezzanine.

Comedian shows have 1500 with standing room, but 1050 with seats.
