= Scrubbaloe Caine =

Canadian music group

- Origin: Calgary, Alberta, Canada
- Genres: Rock; blues rock; boogie rock
- Years active: 1970–1976
- Label: RCA
- Past members: Jim Harmata; Bob Kidd; Paul Dean; Henry Small; Bill McBeth; Al Foreman; Jim Kale; Gary Stefaniuk

Scrubbaloe Caine was a Canadian rock music group, active from 1970 to 1975. Although they released only one album during their time as a band, they are noted for having garnered a Juno Award nomination for Most Promising Group, and for the participation of several members who subsequently went on to greater success with other bands.

The band was formed in 1970 in Calgary, Alberta, by guitarists Jim Harmata and Paul Dean, bassist Bob Kidd, violinist Henry Small and keyboardist Al Foreman, and drummer Bill McBeth was subsequently recruited to join the band. Initially known as Cannonball, the band played venues in Calgary, Winnipeg and Quebec City. Kidd left the band early on, and was replaced by former Guess Who bassist Jim Kale.

The band relocated to Toronto in 1972, and signed to RCA Records. Their album Round One was released in 1973, and was supported by a national tour as an opening act for the Guess Who and an appearance on CBC Television's music performance series Live. The album was moderately successful, appearing in the RPM Hot 100 Albums chart; the single "Feelin' Good on Sunday" charted on the magazine's country chart, and "I'm a Dreamer" charted on the RPM 100 singles chart.

They garnered a Juno Award nomination for Most Promising Group at the Juno Awards of 1974. Later in the year, Kale left the band and was replaced by Gary Stefaniuk. However, around the same time they were dropped from RCA.

They signed to Bronco Records in 1975, and planned a second album to be titled Street Level. The album was never completed or released, and the band broke up in 1976. Dean went on to join Streetheart before becoming a founding member of Loverboy, while Small established the band Small Wonder before joining Burton Cummings' touring band and later joining Prism.
