= Spaceship Superstar =

Single by Prism

from the album Prism
- B-side: "Julie"
- Released: 1977
- Recorded: 1977
- Studio: Mushroom, Vancouver, Canada
- Genre: AOR, space rock
- Length: 3:20 (single version); 4:09 (album version)
- Label: GRT
- Songwriter: Jim Vallance
- Producers: Bruce Fairbairn; Jim Vallance

Prism singles chronology
"Spaceship Superstar" (1977)	"Open Soul Surgery" (1977)

"Spaceship Superstar" is the first official single by the Canadian rock band Prism. The song was written by Jim Vallance. It was also the first single from the band's self-titled debut album. "Spaceship Superstar" reached No. 63 on the Canadian Singles Chart and No. 82 on the Billboard Hot 100 singles chart in the United States.

In 1978, "Spaceship Superstar" received the Certificate of Honour from Performing Rights Organization of Canada (PROCAN). The song was used as the wake up song for the Space Shuttle Discovery crew members in 2011.

== Composition ==
The song was written by Jim Vallance under the pseudonym "Rodney Higgs". He first worked on the song in 1975, but finished in 1977. By the time the song became a hit, Vallance had already left Prism. According to Vallance, the influence on the lyrics of the song came from the George Lucas film Star Wars, which was released as he was writing the song. Musically the song was influenced by "Autobahn" by Kraftwerk, songs from the album Who's Next by the Who, and "Free Ride" by the Edgar Winter Group.

== Versions ==
The album version of "Spaceship Superstar" is 4 minutes and 9 seconds long, while the single version is only 3 minutes and 20 seconds long (excludes the extensive intro). A live version is included on Live Tonite, which is 4 minutes and 17 seconds long.

== Usage ==
On Sunday March 6, 2011 Prism's "Spaceship Superstar" was chosen as the wake up song for the Space Shuttle Discovery crew members. This was a significant point in history as it was the last day that the crews of Discovery and the International Space Station were together before Discovery returned to Earth in the last mission of Discovery.

== Personnel ==
Prism

- Lindsay Mitchell – guitar, backing vocals
- Ron Tabak – vocals
- John Hall – keyboards
- Jim Vallance – drums
- Tom Lavin – guitar
- Although Ab Bryant is pictured on the American cover, he did not take part in the recording.

Session Musicians

- Graeme Coleman – Roland electric piano
- Peter Bjerring – ARP Odyssey synthesizer
- Jack Lavin – bass
- Bruce Fairbairn – backing vocals
- David Sinclair – backing vocals

== Charts ==
Charts (1977)	Peak position
Canada Top Singles (RPM)	63
US Billboard Hot 100	82
US Cash Box	100
