= Take Me to the Kaptin =

Single by Prism

from the album Prism
- B-side: "I Ain't Lookin' Anymore" or "It's Over"
- Released: 1977
- Recorded: 1977
- Genre: Rock
- Length: 3:04 (single version); 4:00 (album version)
- Label: GRT
- Songwriter: Jim Vallance
- Producer: Bruce Fairbairn

Prism singles chronology
"It's Over" (1977)	"Take Me to the Kaptin" (1977)	"Take Me Away" (1978)

"Take Me to the Kaptin" is a song by the Canadian rock band Prism, written by Jim Vallance. It was the fourth single from the band's self-titled studio album Prism. “Take Me to the Kaptin” reached No. 52 on the Canadian singles chart and no. 59 on the Billboard Hot 100 singles chart in the United States. In 1978 "Take Me to the Kaptin" received the Certificate of Honour, from Performing Rights Organization of Canada (PROCAN)".

== Versions ==
The U.S. single version (3:01) on Ariola Records has the verses switched. The Canadian single version (3:04) on GRT has the verses in the same order as the album version, and has a slightly longer fade out. Both single mixes also feature more synthesizer and guitar riffs.

== Personnel ==
Prism

- Lindsay Mitchell - Guitar
- Ron Tabak - Vocals
- John Hall - Keyboards
- Jim Vallance - Drums
- Tom Lavin - Guitar

Session Musicians

- Richard Christie - Bass

Although Ab Bryant is considered the bassist and is pictured on the American cover, he did not take part in the recording.

== Charts ==
Chart (1977–1978)	Peak position
US Billboard Hot 100	59
