= Michael Tempo =

American musician

Michael Tempo (born James Michael Temple) is an American drummer, percussionist and songwriter. Tempo is a prolific session musician, working with artists such as Tom Russell, Michelle Shocked, John Renbourn, Anthony Crawford, Jessica Harper, Prism, The Blazers, Marilyn Martin, Jim Matt, John "Juke" Logan, Rosie Flores, and Peter Alsop.

He was the bandleader of the Bonedaddys for over 36 years. He is also a visual artist.

Tempo attended the Kansas City Art Institute, where he studied Graphic Design and Photography and graduated in 1972 with a B.F.A. in Painting and Printmaking. He had art shows in Kansas City, Los Angeles and New Orleans. Also, Tempo, John Puscheck and Michael Randall formed the collaborative art group, the Evil Monkeys. The Evil Monkeys mounted 13 shows before the death of co-founder John Puscheck. The paintings in these exhibitions were in the medium of Krylon on reverse Plexiglass, and each featured a large collaborative triple portrait of the group.
