= Young and Restless (Prism album) =

Studio album by Prism
- Released: May 1980
- Studios: Little Mountain Sound Studios (Vancouver, British Columbia, Canada)
- Genres: Rock; arena rock; soft rock
- Length: 37:48
- Label: Capitol
- Producers: Bruce Fairbairn; Prism

Prism chronology
| Armageddon (1979) | Young and Restless (1980) | All the Best From Prism (1980) |

Singles from Young and Restless
- 1. "Young and Restless" Released: 1980; 2. "American Music" Released: 1980

Professional ratings
Review scores
| Source | Rating |
|---|---|
| AllMusic | 2.5/5 stars |

Young and Restless is the fourth studio album by Canadian rock band Prism, released in May 1980 by Capitol Records. The album is notably the band's last studio album to feature lead vocalist Ron Tabak, and it is also the last album to feature their long-time producer, Bruce Fairbairn.

The album was viewed negatively by the majority of music critics. It was also a commercial disappointment, being their first album failing to chart on the Billboard 200. However, in 1980, Young and Restless did achieve Platinum status in Canada (in excess of 100,000 copies sold).

== Critical reception ==
In a retrospective review for AllMusic, critic Mike DeGagne wrote of the album "The solid instrumental sound and confident songwriting that they produced on their last recording have somehow disappeared, and even John Hall's synthesizers can't muster any redemption amongst the album's filler. Young & Restless showed signs of the band declining in all aspects, which was later confirmed on Prism's future releases."

== Track listing ==
Side one

1. "American Music" (Lindsay Mitchell) – 3:55
2. "Young and Restless" (Al Harlow, Mitchell) – 3:23
3. "Satellite" (Harlow, Mitchell) – 3:26
4. "Party Line" (Mitchell) – 3:23
5. "Acid Rain" (Mitchell) – 4:35

Side two

6. "Another World" (Harlow, Mitchell) – 4:38
7. "The Visitor" (Mitchell) – 2:59
8. "Deception" (Harlow) – 3:46
9. "Hideaway" (Harlow) – 3:57
10. "Runnin' for Cover" (Rocket Norton, Timothy McHugh) – 3:38

Renaissance Records bonus tracks (2019)

11. "Cover Girl"
12. "See Forever Eyes (live)"
13. "Spaceship Superstar (live)"
14. "Take Me to the Kaptin (live)"
15. "Flyin' (live)"

== Personnel ==
Credits are adapted from the Young and Restless liner notes.

Prism

- Ron Tabak — lead vocals
- John Hall — keyboards
- Lindsay Mitchell — guitars, backing vocals
- Rocket Norton — drums
- Al Harlow — bass guitar, guitars, backing vocals

Additional musician

- Bruce Fairbairn — horn section

Production

- Bruce Fairbairn — producer
- Prism — producer
- Bob Rock — engineer
- Mike Fraser — engineer
- Doug Grover — engineer

== Charts ==
| Chart (1980) | Peak position |
|---|---|
| Canada Top Albums/CDs (RPM) | 9 |

== Certifications ==
| Region | Certification | Certified units/sales |
|---|---|---|
| Canada (Music Canada) | Platinum | 100,000^{^} |
^{^} Shipments figures based on certification alone.
