= Armageddon (Prism album) =

Studio album by Prism
- Released: June 1979
- Recorded: 1979
- Genres: Rock; arena rock; soft rock
- Length: 39:29
- Label: Capitol
- Producer: Bruce Fairbairn

Prism chronology
Live Tonite (radio promo) (1978)	Armageddon (1979)	Young and Restless (1980)

Singles from Armageddon
- 1. "Armageddon" Released: 1979; 2. "Virginia" Released: 1979; 3. "Mirror Man" Released: 1980; 4. "You Walked Away Again" Released: 1980; 5. "Night to Remember" Released: 1980

Professional ratings
Review scores
Source	Rating
AllMusic	4/5 stars

Armageddon is the third studio album by Canadian rock band Prism, released in June 1979 by Capitol Records. It achieved double platinum status in Canada (in excess of 200,000 units sold).

Armageddon is notable for several reasons. Bruce Fairbairn received the Canadian music industry 1980 Juno Award for Producer of the Year for the album. Band leader and guitarist-songwriter Lindsay Mitchell received the SOCAN Song of the Year award for "Night to Remember". It is the band's best selling album. Despite all the commercial success, the band's record label, GRT Records, filed for bankruptcy in the same year of the album's release. The album is also notable for the songwriting contributions by Bryan Adams.

== Background ==
Armageddon was crucial in Prism's commercial development. The band had already released two successful albums, both reaching platinum status in Canada (100,000+ units sold). But they had yet to break into the US in a significant way and were only an opening act on the Canadian arena rock tour. Armageddon was expected to be their breakout album, elevating the band to international success and a concert headline act. The first and biggest obstacle the band faced was a lack of songwriting within the lineup. Jim Vallance, under the pseudonym "Rodney Higgs", was the original and principal songwriter for Prism. But after the first album, he withdrew from the band and only provided token contributions. The role of principal songwriter was then left to Lindsay Mitchell. Although a capable songwriter, he could not match the quantity of material written by Vallance. This in turn forced the band to go outside the lineup for new material.

=== Bryan Adams & Jim Vallance (Rodney Higgs) ===
Some of the songwriting and arranging was handled by future 1980s star Bryan Adams and his songwriting partner Jim Vallance (credited as Rodney Higgs for his sole song contribution here, but as Jim Vallance for his arranging contributions). Vallance was once a full-fledged member of the band.

=== GRT bankruptcy ===
Prism's record label, GRT Records, went into bankruptcy in 1979 and the rights to their catalog was purchased by Capitol Records.

== Track listing ==
Side A

1. "Comin' Home" (Steven Moyer, Robert Deans) – 4:32
2. "Jealousy" (Lindsay Mitchell, Bryan Adams) – 3:48
3. "Virginia" (Bruce Miller) – 3:58
4. "You Walked Away Again" (Bryan Adams) – 3:40
5. "Take It or Leave It" (Bryan Adams, Rodney Higgs*) – 4:19

Side B

6. "Armageddon" (Lindsay Mitchell) – 7:47
7. "Night to Remember" (Lindsay Mitchell) – 5:51
8. "Mirror Man" (John Hall, Lindsay Mitchell) – 5:34
- Rodney Higgs* is the pseudonym for Jim Vallance

== Personnel ==
Credits are adapted from the Armageddon liner notes.

- Lindsay Mitchell — lead guitar
- Ron Tabak — vocals
- John Hall — keyboards
- Rocket Norton — drums
- Al Harlow — rhythm guitar, bass
- Bruce Fairbairn — producer
- Bob Rock — recording engineer
- Bryan Adams, Jim Vallance — arrangements on "You Walked Away" and "Take It or Leave It"
- Peter Bjerring — string and horn arrangements on "Armageddon" and "Night to Remember"

== Charts ==
Chart (1979)	Peak position
Canada Top Albums/CDs (RPM)	12

== Certifications ==
Region	Certification	Certified units/sales
Canada (Music Canada)	2× Platinum	200,000^{^}
^{^} Shipments figures based on certification alone.
