= Prism (Prism album) =

Studio album by Prism
- Released: May 1977
- Recorded: 1976–1977
- Genres: Rock, AOR
- Length: 34:17
- Label: GRT
- Producers: Bruce Fairbairn, Rodney Higgs

Prism chronology
Prism (1977)	See Forever Eyes (1978)

Singles from Prism
- 1. "I Ain't Lookin' Anymore" Released: 1976; 2. "Spaceship Superstar" Released: 1977; 3. "Open Soul Surgery" Released: 1977; 4. "It's Over" Released: 1977; 5. "Take Me to the Kaptin" Released: 1977

Professional ratings
Review scores
Source	Rating
Allmusic	2.5/5 stars

Prism is the debut studio album by Canadian rock band Prism, released in May 1977 on the Canadian record label GRT. It was produced primarily by Bruce Fairbairn, and the majority of songs were written by Jim Vallance (who also served as co-producer on three tracks). It achieved platinum status in Canada (in excess of 100,000 units sold). Prism peaked at #137 on the Billboard 200 in November 1977.

"Spaceship Superstar" became the band's signature song and a staple of Canadian rock radio. Record producer Bruce Fairbairn and songwriter Jim Vallance both went on to achieve huge international success.

== Track listing ==
All songs written by Jim Vallance under the pseudonym Rodney Higgs, unless otherwise noted.

1. "Spaceship Superstar" – 4:06
2. "Open Soul Surgery" (R. Higgs, Hillary Knight) – 3:51
3. "It's Over" – 4:06
4. "Take Me to the Kaptin" – 3:59
5. "Vladivostok" – 5:08
6. "Amelia" – 3:14
7. "Freewill" (Tom Lavin) – 3:04
8. "Julie" – 3:21
9. "I Ain't Lookin' Anymore" (Lindsay Mitchell) – 3:28

== Personnel ==
Prism

- Lindsay Mitchell – guitar, vocals
- Ron Tabak – vocals
- John Hall – keyboards
- Ab Bryant – bass on "Freewill" & "I Ain't Looking Anymore"
- Rodney Higgs – drums, keyboards, producer
- Tom Lavin – guitar, vocals, bass on "Spaceship Superstar"

Session

- Richard Christie - bass on "Open Soul Surgery", "Take Me To The Kaptain" & "Amelia"
- Steve Pugsley - bass on "It's Over"
- Graeme Coleman - Roland electric piano On "Spaceship Superstar", Piano On "It's Over"
- Peter Bjerring - Arp Odyssey synthesizer On "Spaceship Superstar"
- Peter Bjerring - Piano On "Open Soul Surgery"

Prism Hornsection

- Bruce Fairbairn – horn, producer
- Tom Keenlyside – horn

== Charts ==
Chart (1977–78)	Peak position
Canada Top Albums/CDs (RPM)	52
US Billboard 200	137

== Certifications ==
Region	Certification	Certified units/sales
Canada (Music Canada)	Platinum	100,000^{^}
^{^} Shipments figures based on certification alone.

== Cover versions ==
- The song "Open Soul Surgery" was covered by April Wine in their 1986 album Walking Through Fire, as well as Ian Lloyd's 1979 album “Goose Bumps”.
- The song "Take Me to the Kaptin" was covered by Parallel 49 and released as a single in June 2020.
