= Don't Let Him Know =

Single by Prism

from the album Small Change
- Released: 1981
- Recorded: 1981
- Studio: Ocean Way Recording
- Genre: Rock; pop rock; soft rock
- Length: 3:09
- Label: Capitol
- Songwriters: Jim Vallance; Bryan Adams
- Producer: John S. Carter

Prism singles chronology
"Cover Girl" (1980)	"Don't Let Him Know" (1981)	"Turn on Your Radar" (1982)

"Don't Let Him Know" is a song by Canadian rock band Prism, written by Jim Vallance and Bryan Adams. It was the lead single from the band's fifth studio album, Small Change (1981). "Don't Let Him Know" was Prism's biggest US hit, peaking at No. 1 on the Mainstream Rock chart and No. 39 on the Billboard Hot 100. It reached No. 49 on the Canadian Singles chart.

== Personnel ==
Prism

- Henry Small – lead vocals
- Lindsay Mitchell – guitar
- Rocket Norton – drums
- Al Harlow – bass guitar

== Charts ==
Chart (1982)	Peak position
Canadian RPM Top Singles	49
U.S. Billboard Hot 100	39
U.S. Top Rock Tracks	1

== Re-recorded version ==
In 2009, Prism re-recorded "Don't Let Him Know" with Al Harlow on lead vocals.

== See also ==
- List of Billboard Mainstream Rock number-one songs of the 1980s
