= Bruce Fairbairn =

Canadian record producer (1949–1999)

- Born: Bruce Earl Fairbairn; December 30, 1949; Vancouver, British Columbia, Canada
- Died: May 17, 1999 (aged 49) Vancouver, British Columbia, Canada
- Occupation: Record producer
- Years active: 1976–1999

Bruce Earl Fairbairn (December 30, 1949 – May 17, 1999) was a Canadian musician and record producer.

In 1977, he joined the rock band Prism as their trumpet player and stayed with the group until 1980. During this time, he launched his career as a record producer by working on Prism's albums.

He was an active music producer from 1976 until his death in 1999. He produced albums for artists such as Loverboy, Blue Öyster Cult, Bon Jovi, Poison, Aerosmith, AC/DC, Scorpions, Van Halen, Chicago, The Cranberries, INXS, Kiss and Yes. His style was notable for introducing dynamic horn arrangements into rock music productions.

Some of his productions include Slippery When Wet and New Jersey by Bon Jovi, Permanent Vacation, Pump, and Get a Grip by Aerosmith, The Razors Edge by AC/DC, and Balance by Van Halen, each of which sold at least three million copies.

Fairbairn was a three-time recipient of the Juno Award for Producer of the Year and was nominated for the Grammy Award for Producer of the Year, Non-Classical in 1994. In 2000 he was inducted into the Canadian Music Hall of Fame.

== Career ==
=== Early life and work with Prism ===
Born in Vancouver, Fairbairn began playing the trumpet at the age of five and also studied piano. Until the age of 16, he was a trumpetist in community groups. Fairbairn founded a rhythm and blues band called The Spectres, while attending Prince of Wales Secondary School in Vancouver. The band was managed by Bruce Allen, who went on to work with Fairbairn throughout his career. In the early 1970s Fairbairn joined the R&B-jazz band Sunshyne. In 1973, bandmate Tom Keenlyside invited Jim Vallance to join the band as their drummer. Vallance left for a trip to Amsterdam later that same year, and in the meantime the band hired a new drummer.

Fairbairn recruited guitarist Lindsay Mitchell, from Vancouver band Seeds of Time, as singer-songwriter and frontman. Fairbairn worked through 1974 to land a recording contract for Sunshyne, using demos of two songs written by Mitchell. By mid-1975, when Fairbairn could not close a record deal for Sunshyne, he approached Vallance for assistance, who became the band's drummer under the pseudonym Rodney Higgs. Vallance also reworked the arrangements on the Mitchell songs and supplied three of his own at Fairbairn's request. One of the Vallance songs, "Open Soul Surgery" impressed an executive at record label GRT, who signed Fairbairn's group to a recording contract in 1976.

Fairbairn's first production credit was the band's 1976 single "I Ain't Lookin' Anymore", which he co-produced with Vallance. Later that same year the band changed names to Prism and released their debut album in 1977. Valance chose not to produce the album and Fairbairn took over the production duties, having quit playing trumpet for the band. The album and reached No. 137 on Billboard's Top LPs & Tapes chart and was achieved platinum status in Canada.

Fairbairn produced Prism's next three albums – See Forever Eyes (1978), Armageddon (1979) and Young and Restless (1980) – all of which went platinum or double platinum in Canada. See Forever Eyes also reached No. 158 on the Billboard chart.

In 1980, Fairbairn won his first of three Canadian music industry Producer of the Year Juno Awards for Prism's third album, Armageddon.

=== Work with Loverboy and early international success ===
In 1980, while still working with Prism, Fairbairn started production work on the debut album for Canadian rock band Loverboy. With the release of the self-titled album Loverboy, Fairbairn achieved his first breakthrough in the U.S. market, marking the beginning of his international success.

Fairbairn's productions attracted a growing list of international artists to Vancouver's Little Mountain Sound Studios to work with him and his protégé Bob Rock.

Over the next five years, Fairbairn's momentum continued with a series of internationally successful projects, including Blue Öyster Cult's The Revölution by Night (1983), Krokus's The Blitz (1984), which went gold in Canada and the U.S., and Honeymoon Suite's The Big Prize (1985), a triple-platinum release in Canada.

=== Work with Bon Jovi and Aerosmith ===
Fairbairn's biggest commercial success is Bon Jovi's Slippery When Wet (1986). By 2024 the album was multi-platinum in the US, having sold more than 15 million copies world-wide, and is one of the top 100 best-selling albums in the United States, propelling Bon Jovi to superstar status. In a 2007 interview with Q magazine, Jon Bon Jovi said that it was "the first time, we were allowed to be us in the studio."

"I've been lucky enough to work with so many different talents," Fairbairn noted, "but Bon Jovi may be the finest. There was record company pressure to deliver the hits, but they were a joy. People seem to concentrate so much on their success that they lose sight of how good these guys are."

His next major production, Aerosmith's 1987 album Permanent Vacation, was another international success and generated a series of hits including "Dude (Looks Like a Lady)", "Angel", and "Rag Doll". Steven Tyler said that Fairbairn was instrumental in the creation of the album and "helped relight the fire under Aerosmith".

In 1988, Fairbairn produced the Bon Jovi album New Jersey. More than 300,000 copies of the album were sold within six weeks of its release, which was the most units sold for a rock album in the US at the time, breaking the previous record held by Van Halen's album 1984. By 1996 it had reached 7x Platinum status.

The following year, Fairbairn produced Aerosmith's Pump, which sold eight million copies and won him another "Producer of the Year" Juno Award. In 1993, he produced their follow-up album Get a Grip, which sold seven million copies.

Steven Tyler told Billboard magazine: "He was very instrumental in birthing three of the greatest albums we've done. He was so good at being free and open and passing on ideas and arrangements. He could be a bastard and hard to work with. He'd push me. But we did some great albums with his help. He helped relight the fire under Aerosmith after all those years."

=== Continued international success ===
Throughout the 1990s, Fairbairn worked with a string of internationally influential hard rock acts. In 1990 he produced AC/DC's The Razors Edge, and Poison's Flesh and Blood. He was nominated for Producer of the Year at the 36th Annual Grammy Awards, held in 1994, and lost to fellow Canadian producer David Foster.

Fairbairn produced Scorpions' Face the Heat and in 1995 Van Halen's Balance. Also in 1995, Fairbairn went to Vallance's Armoury Studios in Vancouver to work on Chicago's Night and Day: Big Band, and liked the studio so much he bought it from Vallance the following year.

In late 1996, and through early 1997, Fairbairn produced INXS' comeback album Elegantly Wasted which, while garnering mixed reviews, obtained sales that were higher than the band's previous albums. It reached number 41 on the Billboard Top 200, it peaked at number 14 in both Canada and Australia, and reached number 16 in the United Kingdom.

Fairbairn also produced The Cranberries' To the Faithful Departed (1996), and Kiss's reunion-album Psycho Circus (1998).

His last fully completed project was the Atomic Fireballs' Torch This Place for Atlantic Records in 1998, which Fairbairn described as "a return to my brass roots".

== Death and legacy ==
On May 17, 1999, Fairbairn was found dead in his Vancouver home by Yes lead singer Jon Anderson and Armoury Studios manager Sheryl Preston. Fairbairn had been working on the Yes's album The Ladder at the time. His interviews concerning The Ladder represent some of Fairbairn's final moments on camera, included in short sections as part of the bonus material on Yes's Live at the House of Blues DVD. Fellow Canadian music producer Bob Rock, who had studied under Fairbairn, said that, on the week Fairbairn died, the two were to travel to New York to meet Bon Jovi for another album together.

Fairbairn was survived by his wife, Julie, with whom he had three sons: Scott, Kevin, and Brent.

A memorial, "A Celebration of the Life of Bruce Earl Fairbairn", held at the Chan Centre for the Performing Arts, was attended by more than 300 people. The event included musical performances from Jon Anderson and Steve Howe performing the song "Nine Voices" from Yes' The Ladder sessions, as well as Tom Keenlyside, guitarist David Sinclair, ending with "Taps" played on Bruce's trumpet by son Brent.

In March 2000, Fairbairn was inducted into the Canadian Music Hall of Fame.

John Kalodner, senior VP of A&R at Columbia Records told Billboard: "To me, Bruce is in the company of such great contemporary popular-music producers as George Martin, Phil Ramone, and Mutt Lange."

== Awards and nominations ==
Year	Award	Category	Nominated work	Result	Ref
1980	Juno Award	Producer of the Year	Armageddon by Prism	Won	
1981	Juno Award	Producer of the Year	"Young & Restless", "Satellite" by Prism	Nominated	
1982	Juno Award	Producer of the Year (with Paul Dean)	"Working for the Weekend", "When It's Over" by Loverboy	Won	
1983	Juno Award	Producer of the Year	"Worlds Away", "She Controls Me" by Strange Advance	Nominated	
1987	Juno Award	Producer of the Year	"You Give Love A Bad Name", "Livin' on a Prayer" by Bon Jovi	Nominated	
1989	Juno Award	Producer of the Year	"Stick To Your Guns" by Bon Jovi; "The Movie" by Aerosmith	Nominated	
1990	Juno Award	Producer of the Year	Pump by Aerosmith	Won	
1991	Juno Award	Producer of the Year	"Thunderstruck" by AC/DC; "Dorianna" by Paul Laine	Nominated	
1994	Grammy Award	Producer of the Year		Nominated	
1997	Juno Award	Producer of the Year	"Free to Decide", "When You're Gone" by The Cranberries	Nominated	
1999	Juno Award	Producer of the Year	"Within", "I Finally Found My Way" by Kiss	Nominated	
2000	CARAS	Canadian Music Hall of Fame		Honoured	

== Production discography ==
- 1977: Prism - Prism
- 1978: Prism - See Forever Eyes
- 1978: Prism - Live Tonite
- 1979: Prism - Armageddon
- 1979: Ian Lloyd - Goose Bumps
- 1980: Prism - Young and Restless
- 1980: Loverboy - Loverboy
- 1980: The Skids - Days in Europa (Second Version)
- 1980: Ian Lloyd - 3WC
- 1981: Loverboy - Get Lucky
- 1982: Strange Advance - Worlds Away
- 1982: Kasim Sulton - Kasim
- 1983: Blue Öyster Cult - The Revölution by Night
- 1983: Loverboy - Keep It Up
- 1984: Krokus - The Blitz
- 1984: Fast Forward - Living in Fiction
- 1985: Black n' Blue - Without Love
- 1985: Honeymoon Suite - The Big Prize
- 1986: Bon Jovi - Slippery When Wet
- 1987: Aerosmith - Permanent Vacation
- 1987: Rock and Hyde - Under the Volcano
- 1987: Loverboy - Wildside
- 1988: Dan Reed Network - Dan Reed Network
- 1988: Bon Jovi - New Jersey
- 1989: Aerosmith - Pump
- 1989: Stairway to Heaven/Highway to Hell
- 1989: Gorky Park - Gorky Park
- 1990: AC/DC - The Razors Edge
- 1990: Paul Laine - Stick It in Your Ear
- 1990: Poison - Flesh & Blood
- 1991: Dan Reed Network - The Heat
- 1992: AC/DC - Live
- 1993: Aerosmith - Get a Grip
- 1993: Scorpions - Face the Heat
- 1994: Jackyl - Push Comes to Shove
- 1995: Van Halen - Balance
- 1995: Chicago - Night & Day: Big Band
- 1996: The Cranberries - To the Faithful Departed
- 1997: INXS - Elegantly Wasted
- 1997: Noise Therapy - Cyclops
- 1998: Kiss - Psycho Circus
- 1998: Atomic Fireballs - Torch This Place
- 1999: Yes - The Ladder

== See also ==
- Music of Canada
- Canadian Music Hall of Fame
