= See Forever Eyes =

Studio album by Prism
- Released: June 1978
- Recorded: January–May 1978
- Studios: Mushroom Studios, Vancouver, Little Mountain Sound Studios, Vancouver, Pinewood Studios
- Genres: Rock; pop rock; arena rock
- Length: 39:22
- Label: GRT
- Producer: Bruce Fairbairn

Prism chronology
Prism (1977)	See Forever Eyes (1978)	Live Tonite (1978 Radio Promo) (1978)

Singles from See Forever Eyes
- 1. "Take Me Away" Released: 1978; 2. "Flyin'" Released: 1978; 3. "See Forever Eyes" Released: 1978; 4. "You're Like the Wind" Released: 1978

Professional ratings
Review scores
Source	Rating
AllMusic	2.5/5 stars

See Forever Eyes is the second studio album by the Canadian rock band Prism. It was originally released in 1978 by GRT. The album was recorded over a period of five months in 1978, at Mushroom Studios, Vancouver, at Little Mountain Sound Studios, Vancouver, and at Pinewood Studios. It was produced by Bruce Fairbairn.

The album was received negatively by music critics, while other reviewers noted good points to the album. It was also a commercial failure, peaking at number 158 on the Billboard 200. However, Prism found some moderate success with the song "Flyin'". The single peaked at 53 on the US Billboard Hot 100.

== Composition ==
The songs "N-N-N-No!" and "You're Like The Wind" were both credited to Jim Vallance under the pseudonym Rodney Higgs as their songwriter. Their bassist Allan Harlow contributed two songs, "Flyin'" and "Take Me Away". Their keyboardist John Hall and guitarist Lindsay Mitchell joined to write the title track "See Forever Eyes".

== Track listing ==
1. "Hello" (Clifford "Skip" Prest, Ken McColl) - 2:48
2. "Flyin'" (Al Harlow) - 4:33
3. "Nickels and Dimes" (Lindsay Mitchell, Harlow) - 4:08
4. "Crime Wave" (Mitchell) - 4:35
5. "You're Like The Wind" (Rodney Higgs) - 3:44
6. "N-N-N-No!" (Higgs) - 2:51
7. "Take Me Away" (Harlow) - 3:17
8. "You're My Reason" (Michael Koren) - 3:36
9. "Just Like Me" (Harlow, Mitchell, Rocket Norton, John Hall, Ron Tabak) - 4:40
10. "See Forever Eyes" (Mitchell, Hall) - 5:10

== Personnel ==
Prism

- Ron Tabak - lead vocals
- Lindsay Mitchell - guitars (except "Take Me Away"), backing vocals
- Rocket Norton - drums
- John Hall - keyboards, backing vocals
- Al Harlow - rhythm guitar, backing vocals, bass guitar on "Flyin'" & "Just Like Me", slide guitar on "You're Like The Wind"

Session

- Ab Bryant - bass guitar
- Tony Nickels - oboe on "You're Like The Wind"

Production

- Producer: Bruce Fairbairn
- Engineers: Rolf Hennemann, Keith Stein, Jefferson Turner
- Assistant engineers: Roger Monk, Jeff Tolman
- Art direction: James O'Mara
- Photography: Peter Beard, James O'Mara

== Charts ==
Chart (1978)	Peak position
Canada Top Albums/CDs (RPM)	59
US Billboard 200	158

== Certifications ==
Region	Certification	Certified units/sales
Canada (Music Canada)	Platinum	100,000^{^}
^{^} Shipments figures based on certification alone.
