= Bruce Allen (band manager) =

Canadian music band manager

Bruce Allen is a Canadian music band manager who has represented a number of popular Canadian musicians including Bachman-Turner Overdrive, Jann Arden, Anne Murray, Bryan Adams, Prism, Loverboy and Michael Bublé. He also manages music producer Bob Rock and American punk band The Offspring. In 1985, Allen spearheaded the charity supergroup Northern Lights, who recorded the song "Tears Are Not Enough" in support of Ethiopian famine relief.

Allen hosted SoundOff, a popular call-in talk show on 99.3 CFOX-FM in Vancouver for much of the 1990s. He did a daily commentary for CKNW's talk radio show called Reality Check until he was let go in 2021.

In 2005, Allen was the recipient of the Special Achievement Award at the SOCAN Awards in Toronto.

He is a co-owner of a WHL team, the Vancouver Giants.

== In popular culture ==
One of Bruce's bands, Bachman-Turner Overdrive, referenced Bruce (not by name) in a song on their 1973 album, Bachman-Turner Overdrive II. The song, "Welcome Home", includes the lines "We went and got ourselves a manager / we all think he's the most / Silver 'vette with gold wheels / We see him cruise around town".

Allen sang background vocals for one of his clients, Bryan Adams, on the song Cuts Like A Knife.
