= Tom Lavin =

American musician

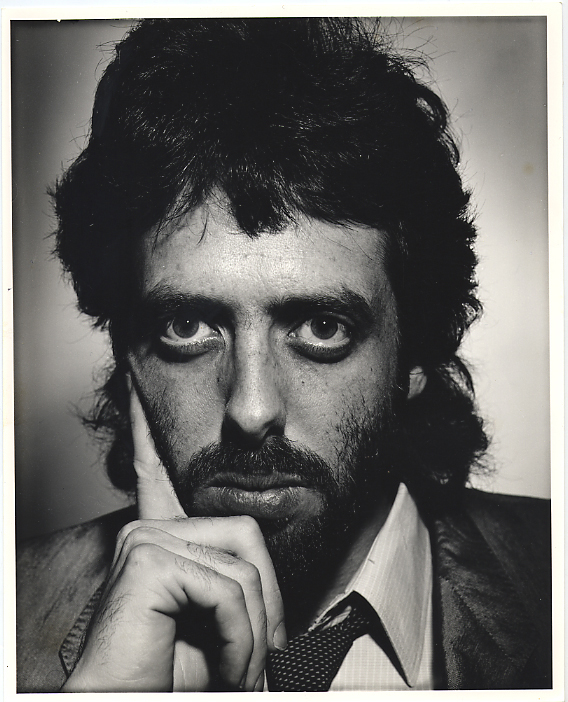
Undated photo of Lavin

Tom Lavin is an American Chicago-born musician and record producer and founding member of the 1981 Juno Award-winning Canadian group, Powder Blues. Leader Tom Lavin has written many of the band's best-known songs including "Doin' It Right," a SOCAN Classics Winner, and "Boppin With the Blues". Lavin has won BCMIA awards for Guitarist, Singer, Songwriter and Producer of the Year, a Juno Award for Best New Band, and the American Blues Music Award.

As a record producer, Lavin has more than a dozen gold and platinum records for Powder Blues, Prism, April Wine, Long John Baldry, Amos Garrett, and many others. Lavin played guitar on Prism's album, Prism (1977) on GRT Records and guitar and drums on the Dale Jacobs and Cobra album for CBS Records (1977). As a composer, Lavin is credited with the soundtrack scores for Out of the Blue (1980), and Genie Award-winning My American Cousin (1985).

Other CDs produced by Lavin include James Buddy Rogers's My Guitar's My Only Friend and Rollin' With the Blues Boss by Kenny "Blues Boss" Wayne Stony Plain Records. Lavin continues to record and perform as Tom Lavin & the Legendary Powder Blues Band and is also director of the Pacific Audio Visual Institute.
