= GRT Records =

Defunct American and Canadian record label

GRT Records was the name of both a U.S. and a Canadian record label, both created by General Recorded Tape, a California-based company that existed from 1965 to 1979. Its demise was concurrent with the bankruptcy of its owner, General Recorded Tape.

== U.S. label ==
GRT Records (United States)
- Parent company: General Recorded Tape
- Founded: 1970; 56 years ago
- Defunct: 1979
- Genre: Various
- Country of origin: United States
- Location: Los Angeles, California

The American branch of GRT Records was founded in 1970.

Artists who released material on GRT Records in the United States included The Mojo Men, Sam Taylor, Lighthouse, Bobby Jameson, Edwards Hand, Terry Bush, Ronnie Hawkins, Colosseum, Mainline, Minnie Riperton, Flower Travellin' Band, Rastus, String Driven Thing, Lotti Golden, Van der Graaf Generator, Meri Wilson and Steve Hackett. Contrary to original expectations, the label was not a major component of the operations of parent General Recorded Tape. Instead of its record releases being referenced to the GRT label, as originally announced, General Recorded Tape referred to its Chess/Janus record operations. The GRT label had more success with its Nashville operations, but the Nashville office was shut down in 1978.

In 1976, GRT Records established a subsidiary, Sunnyvale Records, which concentrated on releases of interest to an older audience, including releases of Dixieland, organ, harmonica and accordion music.

== Canadian label ==
GRT Records (Canada)
- Parent company: General Recorded Tape
- Founded: 1969; 57 years ago
- Defunct: 1979
- Genre: Various
- Country of origin: Canada
- Location: Toronto, Ontario

In contrast to the U.S. label, the Canadian subsidiary became a major source of original releases by Canadian artists. GRT Records, legally known as GRT of Canada Ltd., was established as the Canadian subsidiary of General Recorded Tape. It was initially based in London, Ontario, as a Canadian distributor of 4-track and 8-track tapes produced in the United States. The company was specifically established to produce records of Canadian artists. Its founding president was Ross Reynolds, who later was the president of MCA Records Canada.

The company was relocated to Toronto, Ontario in 1969, and commenced distributing foreign label records and tapes, as well as recording its own artists. By 1976, the foreign labels distributed by GRT in Canada included GRT-owned Chess Records and Janus Records, as well as other labels such as ABC Records, Dunhill Records, Island Records, Festival Records, Westminster Records, America Records, Impulse Records, Musidisc Records, 20th Century Fox Records and Sire Records. In addition to releasing records under the GRT label, other Canadian labels distributed included Axe Records and Daffodil Records. Notable Canadian artists whose records were released by GRT included Dan Hill, Moe Koffman, Ian Thomas, Downchild Blues Band, Lighthouse, Prism and FM.

GRT Records went bankrupt in 1979, with significant effects on the career progress of certain Canadian artists. The second album release of FM had been scheduled for release one week subsequent to the GRT Records bankruptcy. The Canadian band Prism had sold in excess of 200,000 copies of its album Armageddon, which was released the same year as the GRT bankruptcy. Both 8-track tapes and records by The Ramones were remaindered as a result of the GRT bankruptcy. Paradoxically, the remaindering of Ramones music in Canada is regarded as having contributed to the band's popularity in that country, since their music was discovered by persons who would not otherwise have purchased the music at full price.
