= Jim Vallance =

Canadian musical artist (born 1952)

- Also known as: Rodney Higgs
- Born: James Douglas Vallance; May 31, 1952 (age 73)
- Origin: Chilliwack, British Columbia, Canada
- Genres: Rock; AOR; pop rock; hard rock; heavy metal; pop; jazz; blues; country
- Occupations: Songwriter; arranger; producer
- Instruments: Drums; percussion; keyboards; guitar; bass
- Years active: 1977–2005 (semi-retired)
- Labels: A&M; Universal; Polydor
- Website: jimvallance.com

James Douglas Vallance CM (born May 31, 1952) is a Canadian songwriter, arranger and producer. He is best known as the songwriting partner of Canadian musician Bryan Adams. Vallance began his professional career as the original drummer and main songwriter for Canadian rock band Prism under the pseudonym Rodney Higgs. In addition to Adams, Vallance has written songs for many famous international artists such as Bonnie Raitt, Aerosmith, Carly Simon, Rod Stewart, Roger Daltrey, Tina Turner, Alice Cooper, Ozzy Osbourne, Ted Nugent, Europe, Kiss, Scorpions, Anne Murray, and Joe Cocker. His most recognizable songs are "What About Love" (Heart), "Spaceship Superstar" (Prism), "Run to You" (Bryan Adams), "Cuts Like a Knife" (Bryan Adams), "Heaven" (Bryan Adams), "Summer of '69" (Bryan Adams), "Now and Forever (You and Me)" (Anne Murray), and "Edge of a Dream" (Joe Cocker). He also co-wrote "Tears Are Not Enough" for Northern Lights for Africa, an ensemble of Canadian recording artists in support of the 1985 African famine relief. He has won the Canadian music industry Juno award for Composer of the Year four times (a record later shared by The Weeknd). Vallance is a Member of the Order of Canada.

== Profile ==
Vallance is best known as Bryan Adams' songwriting partner from 1978 to 1989 and again from 2005 to 2019.

Vallance has also been involved with the music industry member associations Performing Rights Organization of Canada (PROCAN), Society of Composers, Authors and Music Publishers of Canada (SOCAN), FACTOR (Foundation Assisting Canadian Talent on Recordings) and Songwriters Association of Canada (SAC).

== Biography ==
=== Early life ===
James Douglas Vallance was born on May 31, 1952, in Chilliwack, British Columbia. He grew up in a series of small towns on the west coast of Canada, including Vanderhoof (1964–1967) and Terrace (1967–1970) where he collected fond memories that would later show up in lyrics to some of his songs, like "Summer of '69". He took piano lessons starting at age 7. He then took up guitar and drums at 13. In 1965 he formed a band with some classmates called The Tremelones which was later renamed The Fourmost. At 18, he enrolled in the music program at the University of British Columbia where he studied piano under Frances Marr Adaskin, flute with Conrad Crocker and cello with Hans Seigrist. He re-entered the UBC Music program again in 1973 but dropped out to travel Europe with fellow musicians Peter Bjerring (aka Peter Berring) and Tom Mirhady .

=== Prism (as Rodney Higgs) ===
Vallance joined Vancouver jazz-blues-rock band Sunshyne as a drummer in the early 70s. There he met band member Bruce Fairbairn who would later become an influential Canadian record producer. In 1975, Fairbairn approached Vallance about recording a demo of some of the band's music in hopes of landing a recording contract. Initially, the music was not Vallance's but after several rehearsals, Fairbairn asked Vallance to contribute some of his songs. One of them, "Open Soul Surgery" caught the ear of a record company executive at GRT who offered Fairbairn's group a recording contract. Using various musicians from Sunshyne and another Vancouver band, Seeds of Time, Fairbairn recorded and produced a nine-song album, seven of which were written by Vallance. The band was renamed Prism and Vallance decided to use the pseudonym "Rodney Higgs" rather than his real name in the album credits. The debut Prism album was a success as it hit platinum status in Canada (sales in excess of 100,000.) But Vallance decided to leave the Prism lineup before the next album as he didn't enjoy the constant travel necessary for touring. What he did enjoy was songwriting and arranging and preferred to work out of his makeshift home studio. Although Vallance left the band's lineup, he did help his former bandmates by contributing one song for each of the subsequent two albums, then one more for the 2008 album Big Black Sky.

=== Adams-Vallance songwriting partnership ===
==== Early years ====
Upon leaving the Prism lineup, Vallance worked as a session musician in and around Vancouver to earn a living while his ultimate objective was to be a full-time songwriter. He was in need of a performing artist as a vehicle to promote his songs. Meanwhile, a talented, brash young artist named Bryan Adams had just established himself on the Vancouver music scene with the local band Sweeney Todd. Adams decided to leave the band for a solo career but at 18, he was still inexperienced in the music business. In search of assistance, an informal meeting was arranged between Vallance and Adams at a Long and McQuade musical instrument shop in Vancouver. Vallance and Adams had known about each other through the Vancouver music scene, although they had never been introduced. At the meeting, both admitted they liked the idea of a songwriting partnership and agreed to forge one. The arrangement was twofold. In the long term, the songs would be primarily used as the material for Adams' solo career while, in the short term, they would serve as a source of income by licensing songs to other artists.

The early going was quite difficult. Adams' solo demo recordings were rejected by numerous record companies. Persistence paid off as Adams-Vallance was signed as a songwriting team by A&M late in 1978. The songwriting tandem was unknown, so most artists were not interested in considering their songs. Vallance then landed a contract to write and arrange BTO's next album Rock n' Roll Nights through his association with talent manager Bruce Allen. The role of producer was added midway through recordings when the band fired the first producer. In all, five songs were contributed: Vallance wrote two, "Jamaica" and "Rock 'n Roll Hell", co-wrote two other songs with BTO members, while Adams contributed "Wastin' Time".

In 1979, Prism was back in the studio to record their third album, Armageddon and needed help with songwriting. Since the departure of Vallance (Rodney Higgs), the current lineup was unable to fill the songwriting void adequately. Vallance brought his new protege, Adams, along to help. Adams wrote or co-wrote three songs for the album and played guitar on one track. "Take It Or Leave It" was credited as "B. Adams/R. Higgs" since Vallance wanted to identify with his Prism fans by using his pseudonym.

Vallance then produced Franco-Ontarian band CANO's Rendezvous that summer. Vallance then landed another contract through Bruce Fairbairn to write songs for Ian Lloyd in 1980 and again in 1982. In total, six Adams-Vallance compositions were used by Lloyd and another four were collaborations between Vallance and Lloyd's band. In between, Vallance worked as a session and club musician, and took a job as the drummer for Tom Jones' TV show produced out of Vancouver. Also, in 1981, Vallance co-produced (along with the band) the second album by Vancouver's Doug and the Slugs, Wrap It!. Vallance also continued to work as an arranger and co-songwriter for other acts, working with Toronto on an unreleased track called "What About Love" in 1982, which would eventually become a huge hit for the band Heart.

In 1982, Vallance and Adams received a call from producer Michael James Jackson inquiring about contributing songs for the next Kiss album. Although Vallance and Adams were not heavy metal fans, it was a golden opportunity for exposure for their songs by a world-class rock act. With outside collaboration from Gene Simmons, "War Machine" and a re-written "Rock 'n Roll Hell" were recorded for Kiss' Creatures of the Night release that year. Later, Bonnie Raitt who heard a demo of their song "No Way To Treat A Lady" decided to record it. Between 1980 and 1982, Adams recorded and released his first two solo albums, self-titled Bryan Adams and You Want It You Got It. Vallance doubled as co-producer on the first. Although neither album was a big success, Adams' extensive touring helped him garner a lot of recognition as an artist. The Adams-Vallance songwriting team was starting to gain momentum.

==== Cuts Like a Knife ====
Cuts Like a Knife was Adams' breakthrough album. Released in 1983, it established him as a legitimate North American music star (the album did not chart in Europe.) It also established the Adams-Vallance songwriting team in the music industry as other artists started to consider their songs seriously. The album spun 3 singles: "Straight from the Heart", "Cuts Like a Knife" and "This Time". "I'm Ready", "The Only One" and "Take Me Back" also received airplay. Ironically, "Straight from the Heart" was the highest charting of the three and is not a Vallance composition. It was written by Vancouver singer/songwriter Eric Kagna, with Adams adding the instrumental bridge, and credited as Adams-Kagna. The others were Adams-Vallance compositions. The album Cuts Like a Knife was certified three times platinum in Canada and certified one time platinum in the US. At the Canadian Juno music awards, "Cuts Like a Knife" and "Straight from the Heart" were nominated for a Single of the Year award, while "Cuts Like a Knife" won the Composer of the Year award for Adams-Vallance.

==== Reckless ====
Reckless made Adams an international superstar. By the end of 1985, Reckless had spun off six singles and sold millions of copies worldwide. Adams-Vallance was now considered one of the top songwriting acts in the music industry. No longer did they have to forward demos to artists hoping they would consider them as now their agents were contacting Adams-Vallance requesting their services.

The Adams-Vallance team wrote songs for artists such as Paul Dean, Kiss, and Bonnie Raitt. After sharing Juno Awards as a composer of the year with Adams in 1984 and 1985, Vallance won two awards alone in 1986 and 1987. He was co-recipient with Adams of PRO Canada's William Harold Moon Award for international achievement in 1985.

==== Northern Lights for Africa ====
Vallance was involved in the Northern Lights for Africa famine relief cause in 1985 as co-writer and executive producer of the song "Tears Are Not Enough". David Foster had been contacted by Quincy Jones, producer of the USA for Africa ensemble, asking him if he could the same by Canadian artists. The American artists had just recorded "We Are the World", and Jones was interested in including a song by the Canadian artists on the album. Foster accepted and approached Vallance who he knew was working out of the same studio at that time. Although Foster and Vallance knew each other through the music industry, they had never collaborated on a song before this. Foster arrived at Vallance's home the next day and the two worked on the music in Vallance's home studio. Foster had to leave that evening to return to the studio and left the lyrics to Vallance. Rachel Paiement, Vallance's wife, wrote the French lyrics as she is Franco-Ontarian and a songwriter in her own right. Bryan Adams returned from touring the following day to help complete the lyrics. The title was taken from an unrelated, unrecorded song by Bob Rock and Paul Hyde of the Canadian band The Payola$ which Foster was producing at the time. The songwriting is credited to Foster, Vallance, Adams, Paiement, Rock & Hyde. The recording with the grand ensemble of Canadian artists took place on February 10, 1985, at Manta Studios in Toronto, Ontario. Vallance played the drums on the recording. Vallance was credited as executive producer for recording Bruce Cockburn's part in a studio in Hamburg, Germany.

==== Breakup and reconciliation ====
During 1989, the Adams-Vallance songwriting partnership became strained to the point that it was dissolved. The team was under intense pressure from the record company to follow up Reckless. Instead they delivered Into the Fire, which was poorly received by critics, and although it sold several million copies, coming off the success of Reckless, it was a commercial disappointment. Meanwhile, Vallance had just become a father and his lifestyle had changed considerably. Also, Adams complained that Vallance was coming back to the partnership burnt out from writing and producing songs with other artists and insisted that if they were to continue at the level they had been at, Vallance should put other projects on hold until they had another album. Vallance complied with Adams' request but after several failed attempts to write and record what Adams felt was suitable material, Vallance informed Adams that he no longer wanted to work with him and the Adams-Vallance partnership went into hiatus.

Adams and Vallance were essentially estranged for some time, with only sporadic contact. In 2003, Adams approached Vallance inquiring if he would like to co-write a few songs for his next album. Vallance agreed and three songs on Adams' album 11 are credited with Vallance as co-writer. Adams then approached him to write the Olympic song with him and another Olympic song for ARD TV in Germany.

==== Glass Tiger ====
Following the release of Reckless, Vallance worked with a new Canadian band Glass Tiger. Initially hired to help with arrangements, the band eventually asked Vallance to produce their debut album. Vallance co-wrote such hits as "Someday" and "Don't Forget Me (When I'm Gone)", which won the Canadian music industry Juno award for 1986 Single of the Year.

Following Glass Tiger's second album, Vallance declined offers to produce future albums. He cited the long hours and tedious work as reasons. He had more enjoyment in just the songwriting and arranging.

==== Aerosmith ====
In 1986, Aerosmith was a band in turmoil. Their previous album Done with Mirrors went below the radar in sales and airplay. To make matters worse, band members' alcohol and drug habits were causing problems. Geffen Records would only fund their next recording provided all the bandmembers complete drug and alcohol rehab which they did. After listening to the demos, the record company did not believe there was any material that would get them airplay. A second condition was then placed on them and that was to have outside songwriters to work with the band members. Initially, band members were not warm to the idea.

In the late 1980s and early 1990s, Vallance helped to write several songs with the band, including some of the hit singles "Rag Doll" (1987), "Hangman Jury" (1987), "The Other Side" (1989), "Eat the Rich" (1993), and "Deuces are Wild" (1994), in addition to several other Aerosmith songs. He also co-wrote the single "Legendary Child", which was initially written in 1991, and then later re-worked and released in 2012 as the lead single on Music from Another Dimension!.

== Awards ==
Vallance has been awarded or honored with over 35 SOCAN and Procan Classics and related awards, as well as awards from BMI, and ASCAP. Vallance served on the boards of PROCAN (1985–90); SOCAN (1996–8, 2000–3, 2006–9); FACTOR (1985–7); and the Songwriters Association of Canada in 2008, and the latter's advisory board 1998–2008. In 2003, Vallance won an International Achievement Award for the song "Heaven" at the SOCAN Awards in Toronto.

In 2007, Vallance was appointed to the Order of Canada and invested in 2008.

== Personal life ==
Vallance married singer-songwriter Rachel Paiement in the early 1980s. Paiement is a former member of the groups CANO and Morgan. She is an accomplished singer-songwriter in her own right. They have one child, Jimmy, who was a house DJ during his high school years and is currently an electronic musician for house/alternative band Bob Moses.

== See also ==
- List of songs written by Jim Vallance
