= Lindsay Mitchell =

- Born: Lindsay Christopher Mitchell; May 28, 1949 (age 76); North London, England
- Origin: Vancouver, British Columbia, Canada
- Genres: Rock; pop rock; arena rock; soft rock
- Occupations: Musician; songwriter
- Instrument: Guitar
- Years active: 1971–present

Lindsay Christopher Mitchell (born 28 May 1949) is an English-born Canadian musician and songwriter who achieved success as the guitarist and founder of the Canadian rock band Prism.

== Early life ==
Born on May 28, 1949, in North London, England, Mitchell emigrated to Alberta, Canada with his family in 1957, finally settling in Vancouver, British Columbia, in 1962. He developed his guitar skills by emulating instrumental surf music bands such as the Shadows, the Ventures, the Astronauts, and British Invasion artists including the Beatles, the Rolling Stones, and the Yardbirds.

== Musical career ==
After graduating from high school in 1965 at the age of 15, Mitchell joined local Vancouver pop-rockers "William Tell & the Marksmen", which later morphed into "Paisley Rain". Following that, Mitchell became a member of the psychedelic era band, the "Seeds of Time". During his tenure with the Seeds of Time Mitchell toured and played with venerated bluesmen Willie Dixon, Albert Collins, and T-Bone Walker, experiences which helped reinforce in Mitchell a deep-seated and lifelong love for the blues.

=== Prism ===
In 1973, Mitchell left the Seeds of Time to join guitarist/singer/songwriter Tom Lavin and his brother Jack as a member of the house band at Rohan's Rockpile, a live music venue in the Kitsilano neighborhood of Vancouver. in 1974, he joined Bruce Fairbairn's rhythm and blues band "Sunshyne", after being recruited to assist in helping to transform their sound from jazz fusion into blues rock. To maximize their chances of securing a record deal, Mitchell voluntarily withdrew as lead vocalist and was replaced by Ron Tabak, whom he discovered while fronting the band "Not Fragile". The project was renamed Prism, and their self-titled debut album was released on the GRT Records in 1977. The album achieved platinum status in Canada, a first for a debut Canadian artist. Following the departure of drummer Jim Vallance in 1978 (replaced by Seeds of Time drummer Rocket Norton) Mitchell assumed the role of principal songwriter composing numerous Prism hits, including "Armageddon", the title track for the band's third album and one of the band's most recognizable songs. He later received a SOCAN Song of the Year award for "Night to Remember", a ballad written for the Armageddon album. Night to Remember also received an award from the Canadian Performing Rights Organization (PRO).

Prism disbanded temporarily in 1982 but reformed again in 1987 with new singer Darcy Deutsch, former lead singer Ron Tabak having died as the result of a brain injury on Christmas Day 1984. Mitchell continued to perform with Prism until 2005 when he left the group following a dispute with sole remaining core member, Al Harlow.

=== Recent work ===
Mitchell was part of the legendary "Billy Mitchell's Trainwreck," a much celebrated rockabilly vocal and instrumental group formed in 1983 with the late Bill Cowsill (of the Cowsill family band), and upright bassist Elmar Spanier.

Other memorable collaborations include close friends British blues legend Long John Baldry, and St. Louis-born actor/musician, Jim Byrnes.

== Personal life ==
A graduate of the University of British Columbia, Dr. Mitchell holds a PhD in Curriculum studies (2010), an MA degree in Adult Education (2002), and a BA in Political Science (1998). UBC Alma Mater Society Ombudsman from 1998 until 2002, he presently resides in Penticton, British Columbia.
