= Over 60 Minutes with Red Rider =

Compilation album by Red Rider
- Released: 1987
- Genre: Rock
- Length: 66:50
- Label: Capitol

Red Rider chronology
Tom Cochrane and Red Rider (1986)	Over 60 Minutes with Red Rider (1987)	Victory Day (1988)

Professional ratings
Review scores
Source	Rating
Allmusic	4/5 stars

Over 60 Minutes with Red Rider is a compilation album for the Canadian rock band Red Rider, which was released in 1987.

== Track listing ==
All tracks are written by Tom Cochrane except where noted

No.	Title	Writer(s)	Length
1.	"Light in the Tunnel"		2:24
2.	"Power (Strength in Numbers)"		5:54
3.	"Human Race"		2:58
4.	"Can't Turn Back"		4:28
5.	"Napoleon Sheds His Skin"		5:49
6.	"Walking the Fine Line"	Rob Baker, Tom Cochrane, Ken Greer	4:49
7.	"Winner Take All"	Baker, Cochrane, Greer	4:00
8.	"Crack the Sky (Breakaway)"		5:58
9.	"Lunatic Fringe"		4:20
10.	"Cowboys in Hong Kong (As Far as Siam)"	Baker, Cochrane, Greer	4:06
11.	"Thru the Curtain"	Baker, Cochrane, Peter Boynton, Greer, Jeff Jones	3:17
12.	"What Have You Got to Do"		3:18
13.	"White Hot"	Cochrane, Greer	5:07
14.	"Don't Fight It"		4:25
15.	"Avenue "A""		3:25
16.	"Young Thing, Wild Dreams (Rock Me)"	Baker, Boynton, Cochrane, Greer, Jones	3:32
17.	"Breaking Curfew"	Baker, Boynton, Cochrane, Greer, Jones	3:43
