= Neruda (album) =

Studio album by Red Rider
- Released: January 18, 1983
- Studios: Metalworks, Mississauga, ON
- Genres: New wave; AOR
- Length: 38:00
- Label: Capitol
- Producers: David Tickle (except tracks 6 and 7 produced by Ed Thacker)

Red Rider chronology
As Far as Siam (1981)	Neruda (1983)	Breaking Curfew (1984)

Singles from Neruba
- 1. "Human Race" Released: 1983; 2. "Power (Strength in Numbers)" Released: 1983; 3. "Crack the Sky (Breakaway)" Released: 1983

Professional ratings
Review scores
Source	Rating
Allmusic	3/5 stars

Neruda is the third studio album by Canadian rock band Red Rider, released in 1983 (see 1983 in music). The album was recorded at Metalworks Studios in Toronto, Ontario. The figure on the album cover was inspired by Denise Sexton. The instrumental track "Light In the Tunnel" followed by "Power" (with vocals) have been used to open Red Rider's concerts on several tours. Neruda became Red Rider's third straight platinum album in Canada, selling more than 100,000 copies, and peaking at number 11 on the charts.

Neruda reached number 66 on Billboard's Pop Albums chart in 1983 assisted by the singles "Crack The Sky (Breakaway)" and "Power (Strength In Numbers)" which reached number 39 and number 13 respectively on Billboard's Mainstream Rock chart. "Human Race" reached number 29 in Canada and number 11 on Billboard's Mainstream Rock chart.

The album is named after Chilean poet Pablo Neruda.

The track "Can't Turn Back" was featured in the Miami Vice season 2 episode "Tale of the Goat."

== Track listing ==
All tracks are written by Tom Cochrane.

LP release
No.	Title	Length
1.	"Light in the Tunnel"	2:25
2.	"Power (Strength in Numbers)"	3:53
3.	"Human Race"	2:55
4.	"Can't Turn Back"	3:50
5.	"Napoleon Sheds His Skin"	5:40
6.	"Walking the Fine Line"	4:40
7.	"Winner Take All"	3:55
8.	"Sights on You"	3:27
9.	"Crack the Sky (Breakaway)"	3:53
10.	"Work Out"	3:22

CD bonus tracks
No.	Title	Length
11.	"Light in the Tunnel/Human Race"	4:39
12.	"White Hot" (Cochrane, Ken Greer - originally from Don't Fight It)	5:09
13.	"Lunatic Fringe" (originally from As Far as Siam)	4:21

== Personnel ==
- Tom Cochrane - lead vocals, guitars, arrangements
- Ken Greer - guitars, vocals, arrangements
- Rob Baker - drums, percussion
- Jeff Jones - bass guitar, vocals
- Steve Sexton - synthesizers, piano, programming

Additional personnel

- Hugh Syme - art direction and cover design
- Deborah Samuel - photography

== Charts ==
Chart (1983)	Peak position
Canada Top Albums/CDs (RPM)	12
US Billboard 200	66

== Certifications ==
Region	Certification	Certified units/sales
Canada (Music Canada)	Platinum	100,000^{^}
^{^} Shipments figures based on certification alone.
