= Songs of a Circling Spirit =

Compilation album by Tom Cochrane
- Released: September 23, 1997
- Genre: Heartland rock
- Length: 53:29
- Label: Capitol
- Producer: Tom Cochrane

Tom Cochrane chronology
Ragged Ass Road (1995)	Songs of a Circling Spirit (1997)	Xray Sierra (1999)

Professional ratings
Review scores
Source	Rating
Allmusic	2.5/5 stars

Songs of a Circling Spirit is an album by Canadian musician Tom Cochrane released in 1997. The album contains newly recorded acoustic versions of selected songs written by Cochrane, and previously recorded either by Cochrane or Red Rider.

== Track listing ==
All tracks are written by Tom Cochrane unless otherwise noted

No.	Title	Writer(s)	Length
1.	"Lunatic Fringe"		4:37
2.	"Paper Tigers"		3:39
3.	"Good Man, Feeling Bad"		4:11
4.	"Brave and Crazy"		4:30
5.	"All the King's Men"		4:11
6.	"Dreamer's Dream"		4:53
7.	"Human Race"		3:18
8.	"Napoleon Sheds His Skin"		5:47
9.	"White Hot"	Cochrane, Ken Greer	4:39
10.	"Boy Inside the Man"		3:40
11.	"Washed Away"		5:20
12.	"I Wish You Well"		4:44

== Personnel ==
- Tom Cochrane - guitar, vocals, mixing
- Gregor Beresford - drums, djembe
- Bill Bell - guitar, mandolin, background vocals
- Tara Maclean - background vocals
- John Webster - mixing
- Bob Ludwig - mastering
- Ed Krautner - engineering and mixing
- John Rummen - art direction and design
- Crystal Heald - design
- Andrew MacNaughtan - photography
- Justin Zivojinovich - photography
