= Young Thing, Wild Dreams (Rock Me) =

1984 song by Red Rider

- Cover of the single

Single by Red Rider

from the album Breaking Curfew
- Released: 1984 (US)
- Studio: Metalworks Studios, E.S.P. Studio, Toronto, Ontario
- Genre: Hard rock
- Length: 3:32
- Label: Capitol
- Songwriter(s): Tom Cochrane
- Producer(s): Tom Cochrane & Ken Greer

Red Rider singles chronology
"Crack the Sky (Breakaway)" (1983)	"Young Thing, Wild Dreams (Rock Me)" (1984)	"Breaking Curfew" (1984)

"Young Thing, Wild Dreams (Rock Me)" is a song by the band Red Rider, released in 1984 as a single and climbing to No. 71 on the Billboard Hot 100, No. 13 on the Mainstream Rock chart, and No. 44 in Canada.

== The song ==
Written by band leader Tom Cochrane, "Young Thing" was the first single from their 1984 album Breaking Curfew. It was released with a video that got some play on MTV.

== Personnel ==
- Tom Cochrane - lead vocals, guitars, keyboards
- Ken Greer - guitars, keyboards, backing vocals
- Rob Baker - drums, percussion
- Jeff Jones - bass guitar, backing vocals
- John Webster - keyboards

Additional personnel

- Steve Sexton - keyboards
- Earle Seymour - saxophone
- Rough Maids - backing vocals
- Norman Moore - art direction and design
- Beverly Parker - photography
