= Lewis Nitikman =

Canadian musician and songwriter

Lewis Nitikman, also credited as Lewis Samuels Nitikman, is a Canadian musician, songwriter, producer, teacher and recording artist. He was a keyboardist for the Grammy-nominated band Stonebolt and a founding member of the band Diamond in the Rough. Nitikman has also had notable publishing and recording success in Canada and England. He wrote and produced 2 Canadian Gold winning albums, Diamond in the Rough and Neil Harnett's Times Like This.

== Early life and education ==
Nitikman was born on 7 April 1959 in Winnipeg, Canada. He studied at the Berklee College of Music in Boston on a double scholarship for composition.

== Career ==
=== Stonebolt ===
In 1983, Nitikman was a piano player at an Italian restaurant in Vancouver when he approached the Stonebolt band, who were dining at the restaurant, and told them audaciously to contact him if they ever needed a keyboard player. When keyboardist John Webster was leaving the band, Nitikman was invited to audition. Nitikman joined Stonebolt when he was 21 and played on the band's fourth album, Juvenile American Princess (1982).

After winning a double scholarship for composition, Nitikman quit the band and headed to Boston to study at the Berklee College of Music.

=== Diamond in the Rough ===
Lewis returned to Canada, where he founded the group Diamond in the Rough with singer/writer Dave Buckthorpe in 1986. In 1988, Buckthorpe and Nitikman wrote and released the eponymously-named album Diamond in the Rough.

The classic rock album was called a masterpiece and rated 9/10 by Metal Temple Magazine. The album produced three hits for the pair and was inducted into the Museum of Canadian Music.

=== Subsequent work ===
In 1991, Nitikman and Barry Mathers wrote the song "That is Across the Water" for the 1991 British Columbia Games for the Physically Disabled.

Nitikman is listed as a co-composer on the soundtrack for the 2008 Canadian short film Loving Loretta and for additional music/tracks on the television series Northwood.

Today, Nitikman records, writes and performs with former Boy On A Dolphin singer-songwriter, John Reilly in Sheffield, UK. The pair record at Yellow Arch Studios where their songs have regularly made the BBC Radio 2 playlists. Nitikman also teaches piano and keyboard. In 2011, the pair had a hit with the song "Building Avalon".

Nitikman also produced Neil James Harnett's 2023 Times Like This.

== Personal life ==
Nitikman teaches piano and keyboard from his studio in Sheffield. He counts Stonebolt's Ray Roper, and the piano players Doc Fingers, and Kevin Crowe, as his mentors.

== Select discography ==
- Stonebolt. Silent Night/7:00 News 2001. Single. 2001.
- Diamond in the Rough. Where Is Love. Single. [Polydor Records,] 1987.
- Lewis Nitikman and John Reilly. Building Avalon. Single. 2011.
