= As Far as Siam =

Studio album by Red Rider
- Released: June 30, 1981
- Recorded: 1981
- Studio: Sunset Sound (Hollywood)
- Genre: Rock
- Length: 34:52
- Label: Capitol
- Producers: Richard Landis (except tracks 5 and 9 produced by Michael James Jackson)

Red Rider chronology
Don't Fight It (1979)	As Far as Siam (1981)	Neruda (1983)

Singles from As Far as Siam
- 1. "What Have You Got To Do" Released: 1981; 2. "Lunatic Fringe" Released: 1981

Professional ratings
Review scores
Source	Rating
Allmusic	4/5 stars

As Far as Siam is the second studio album by the Canadian rock band Red Rider. The majority of the album was recorded at Sunset Sound in Los Angeles and produced by Richard Landis; two tracks were produced in Toronto by Michael James Jackson. The album was released by Capitol Records on June 30, 1981.

The album reached #65 on Billboard's Pop Albums chart in 1981. The single "What Have You Got to do (To Get Off Tonight)" peaked at #16 on the Canadian charts.

== Background and writing ==
"Lunatic Fringe", the band's most famous song, is about what composer Tom Cochrane saw as an alarming rise of anti-Semitism in the 1970s, and was inspired by a book he read about Raoul Wallenberg. The song is featured in the 1985 high-school wrestling movie Vision Quest, the Miami Vice episode "Smuggler's Blues", the My Name Is Earl episode "The Bounty Hunter" and on an episode of Eastbound & Down. The beginning of the song is used as a part of a bump for the Cincinnati radio station, WEBN. It is also the inspiration for Kurt Angle's entrance theme in Total Nonstop Action Wrestling. It is also used as American Mixed Martial Artist Dan Henderson's and Randy Couture's entrance theme as of late. American guitarist Gary Hoey covered "Lunatic Fringe" on his 2006 album American Made.

The distinctive guitar solo in "Lunatic Fringe" was performed by Kenny Greer on a lap steel, also seen in the song's music video.

== Track listing ==
All tracks are written by Tom Cochrane unless otherwise noted.

Side one
No.	Title	Writer(s)	Length
1.	"Lunatic Fringe"		4:23
2.	"Cowboys in Hong Kong (As Far as Siam)"	Rob Baker, Cochrane, Ken Greer	4:08
3.	"Only Game in Town"		3:21
4.	"Thru the Curtain"	Baker, Peter Boynton, Cochrane, Greer, Jeff Jones	3:19
5.	"What Have You Got to Do (To Get Off Tonight)"		3:21

Side two
No.	Title	Writer(s)	Length
6.	"Ships"		4:37
7.	"Caught in the Middle"		4:25
8.	"Don't Let Go of Me"		3:55
9.	"Laughing Man"	Cochrane, Jones	3:38

== Personnel ==
- Tom Cochrane – lead vocals, rhythm guitar
- Ken Greer – lead electric, steel and six string guitars, piano, organ
- Jeff Jones – bass guitar, background vocals
- Peter Boynton – piano, synthesizers, organ, vocals
- Rob Baker – drums, percussion, harmonica on "Lunatic Fringe"

Additional personnel

- Steve Forman – percussion
- Michael Edward Jackson – percussion
- Peter Wolf – synthesizers on "Lunatic Fringe", "Only Game In Town", "Ships", & "Don't Let Go Of Me"
- Jai Winding – keyboards on "Ships" & "Only Game In Town"
- George Doering – acoustic guitar on "Only Game In Town", "Ships", & "Don't Let Go Of Me"
- Charlie Calello – string arrangements on "Ships"

== Charts ==
Chart (1981)	Peak position
Canada Top Albums/CDs (RPM)	33
US Billboard 200	65

== Certifications ==
Region	Certification	Certified units/sales
Canada (Music Canada)	Platinum	100,000^{^}
^{^} Shipments figures based on certification alone.
