= No Stranger (Tom Cochrane album) =

Studio album by Tom Cochrane
- Released: October 31, 2006
- Recorded: at Metalworks Studios in Mississauga, Ontario
- Genre: Rock
- Length: 45:02
- Label: Universal
- Producer: Tom Cochrane

Tom Cochrane chronology
X-Ray Sierra (1999)	No Stranger (2006)	Take It Home (2015)

Singles from No Stranger
- 1. "Didn't Mean" Released: 2006; 2. "The Party Not's Over" Released: 2006; 3. "Out of my Head" Released: 2007; 4. "Northern Star" Released: 2007

Professional ratings
Review scores
Source	Rating
Allmusic	4/5 stars

No Stranger is Canadian singer Tom Cochrane's fifth solo studio album and first album for Universal Music Canada. Released in October 2006, it was his first album in seven years following Xray Sierra in 1999. No Stranger included the singles "Didn't Mean", "The Party's Not Over", "Northern Star", "Out of My Head", and a cover version of Norman Greenbaum's "Spirit in the Sky". The album debuted at #25 on the Canadian Albums Chart.

== Recording ==
Recording took place at Metalworks Studios and Layastone. Cochrane produced the album and mixed it at his studio in Northern Ontario. Red Rider bandmates Ken Greer and Jeff Jones performed on the album. No Stranger received a Juno Award nomination for Canadian Adult Alternative Album of the Year.

== Track listing ==
All tracks are written by Tom Cochrane unless otherwise noted.

No.	Title	Writer(s)	Length
1.	"The Party's Not Over"		3:30
2.	"Glide"		4:12
3.	"While You Are Young""		3:54
4.	"White Horse"		4:34
5.	"Didn't Mean"		4:08
6.	"Rough and Tumble"		4:29
7.	"Out of My Head"		3:49
8.	"Deep Breath"		4:13
9.	"Northern Star"		4:44
10.	"Since You Left Me"		3:32
11.	"Colour Blue"		1:15
12.	"Spirit in the Sky"	Norman Greenbaum	3:12

== Personnel ==
Personnel taken from No Strangers liner notes.

- Tom Cochrane – vocals, acoustic and electric guitars, bass, keyboards, percussion, harmonica, production, engineering, mixing (tracks 3–5, 8, 10–12)
- Tony Feener – drums
- Jeff Jones – bass
- Ken Greer – electric and slide guitars, bass, additional engineering
- Bill Bell – guitars, percussion, additional engineering, mixing (tracks 7, 9)
- George Kohler – additional bass
- John Webster – additional keyboards, additional engineering, mixing (tracks 1, 2, 6)
- Tony Marriott – additional bass
- Gian Carlo Gallo – assistant engineer
- Dylan Argument – additional assistant
- Brent Whitcomb – additional assistant
- João Carvalho – mastering
- David Owen Cameron – art direction, art and design, cover photography
- Garnet Armstrong – art direction
- Roland Wilhelm – back cover photography, liner notes photography
