= Ragged Ass Road =

Ragged Ass Road may refer to:

- Ragged Ass Road (album), a Tom Cochrane album
- Ragged Ass Road (Yellowknife), a street in Yellowknife, Northwest Territories, Canada
