= I Wish You Well =

1995 single by Tom Cochrane

Single by Tom Cochrane

from the album Ragged Ass Road
- B-side: "Ragged Ass Road"
- Released: 1995
- Recorded: Early 1995
- Studio: Metalworks (Mississauga, Canada); Ragged Ass Road
- Length: 4:24
- Label: EMI; Capitol
- Songwriter: Tom Cochrane
- Producers: Tom Cochrane; John Webster

Tom Cochrane singles chronology
"Bigger Man" (1992)	"I Wish You Well" (1995)	"Wildest Dreams" (1995)

"I Wish You Well" is a song by Canadian singer Tom Cochrane from his third solo studio album, Ragged Ass Road (1995). Inspired by Cochrane's experiences during the years following the success of his previous album, Mad Mad World (1991), the song was released in 1995 as the album's lead single and as Cochrane's first single since "Bigger Man" in 1992.

In Canada, "I Wish You Well" became only the second song—and the first by a Canadian artist—to debut atop the RPM 100 Hit Tracks chart, giving Cochrane his second number-one single in his home country. It also reached number three on the RPM Adult Contemporary Tracks chart. Outside Canada, "I Wish You Well" experienced brief chart success in the United Kingdom and United States.

== Background ==
"I Wish You Well" was written by Tom Cochrane, inspired by the turmoil he experienced after the success of Mad Mad World and the touring to support the album. Described by Cochrane as "a blur", this period left his home life in a state of disorder, including a year in which he separated with his wife, Kathleen. According to Cochrane, "I Wish You Well" and Ragged Ass Road addresses these issues and what he learned from the period. Along with the rest of the album, Cochrane recorded the song at Metalworks Studios in Mississauga, Ontario, and Ragged Ass Road Studio in early 1995.

== Release and chart performance ==
Released as a single in 1995, "I Wish You Well" debuted at number one on the Canadian RPM 100 Hit Tracks chart on September 4, 1995, becoming the second song in the chart's history to accomplish this feat (not counting the magazine's first number one), after Band Aid's "Do They Know It's Christmas?" in 1985. It was also the first song by a Canadian artist to debut at number one. The single stayed at the summit for another week, then dropped to number seven on September 18. It stayed in the top 100 for 26 weeks, last appearing at number 98 on February 26, 1996. It was the fourth most successful single of 1995 in Canada, and it also peaked at number three on the RPM Adult Contemporary Tracks chart on October 9, 1995.

The song did not make a substantial commercial impact outside Canada, charting only in the United Kingdom and the United States. In the latter country, it peaked at number one on the Billboard Bubbling Under Hot 100 Singles chart on November 18, 1995. In the United Kingdom, the song was released on October 9, 1995. The track debuted and peaked at number 93 on the UK Singles Chart on October 15, 1995, then left the top 100 the next week.

== Track listings ==
Canadian promotional CD single

1. "I Wish You Well" – 4:24
2. "Life Is a Highway" – 4:24

Dutch CD single

1. "I Wish You Well" – 4:24
2. "White Hot" (live) – 6:22

Dutch CD maxi-single

1. "I Wish You Well" – 4:24
2. "Ragged Ass Road" – 4:45
3. "White Hot" (live) – 6:22
4. "Lunatic Fringe" (live) – 4:28

UK CD1

1. "I Wish You Well"
2. "Ragged Ass Road"
3. "Life Is a Highway"
4. "White Hot" (live)

UK CD2

1. "I Wish You Well"
2. "Best Waste of Time"
3. "Sinking Like a Sunset"
4. "Lunatic Fringe" (live)

== Credits and personnel ==
Credits are taken from the UK CD1 liner notes and the Ragged Ass Road album booklet.

Studios

- Recorded in early 1995 at Metalworks Studios (Mississauga, Ontario, Canada) and Ragged Ass Road Studio
- Mixed at Encore Studio (Burbank, California, US)

Personnel

- Tom Cochrane – writing, vocals, acoustic guitars, electric guitars, harmonica, production
- Bill Bell – acoustic guitars, electric guitars
- Ken "Spider" Sinnaeve – bass
- Gregor Beresford – drums, percussion
- John Webster – production, engineering
- Ed Krautner – secondary engineering, additional recording
- Tom Lord-Alge – mixing

== Charts ==
=== Weekly charts ===
Chart (1995)	Peak position
Canada Top Singles (RPM)	1
Canada Adult Contemporary (RPM)	3
UK Singles (Official Charts)	93
US Bubbling Under Hot 100 (Billboard)	1

=== Year-end charts ===
Chart (1995)	Position
Canada Top Singles (RPM)	4
Canada Adult Contemporary (RPM)	48

== Release history ==
Region	Date	Format(s)	Label(s)	Ref.
Canada	1995	Radio	EMI	
United States	October 3, 1995	Contemporary hit radio	Capitol	
United Kingdom	October 9, 1995	CD; cassette	EMI	
