= When I'm with You =

When I'm with You may refer to:

- "When I'm with You" (Sheriff song)
- "When I'm with You" (Faber Drive song)
- "When I'm with You" (Steve Harley song)
- "When I'm with You" (Sparks song)
- "When I'm with You" (Lisa song)
- "When I'm with You", a song by Simple Plan from No Pads, No Helmets...Just Balls
- "When I'm with You", a song by Tom Cochrane from Hang on to Your Resistance
- "When I'm with You", a song by Westlife from Back Home
- "When I'm with You", a 2009 song by Best Coast
- "When I'm with You", a song by Novena
- "When I'm with You", a song by Citizen Way from 2.0
- "When I'm with You" (BGYO song)
