= Take It Home =

Take It Home may refer to:

- Take It Home (B.B. King album), 1979, or the title song
- Take It Home (Hot Rize album), 1990
- "Take It Home" (Johnny Ruffo song)
- Take It Home (Tom Cochrane album), 2015
