= Big League (disambiguation) =

Big League is the official magazine of the National Rugby League.

Big League may also refer to:

- Big league (baseball), baseball term
- "Big League" (song), 1988 song by Tom Cochrane and Red Rider
- Big League Baseball, youth baseball division

== See also ==
- Big Leaguer, 1953 American sports drama film
