= Avenue A =

Avenue A may refer to:

- Avenue A (Brooklyn), in Canarsie, Brooklyn, New York City
- Avenue A (Manhattan), in Manhattan, New York City
  - York Avenue, formerly Avenue A, in Manhattan, New York City
- Avenue A (Saskatoon), now Idylwyld Drive, an arterial road in Saskatoon, Saskatchewan, Canada
- Razorfish (company), formerly Avenue A | Razorfish, an American advertising agency
- "Avenue 'A'", a 1979 song by Red Rider from Don't Fight It
