= Mad Mad World =

- Original Canadian cover

Studio album by Tom Cochrane
- Released: September 19, 1991
- Recorded: 1991
- Studios: Ardent (Memphis, Tennessee); Tom's Cabin (Oakville, Ontario); Hungry Hollow (Georgetown, Ontario); Metalworks (Mississauga, Ontario)
- Genre: Rock
- Length: 64:20
- Label: Capitol
- Producers: Joe Hardy (track 13 produced by Tom Cochrane)

Tom Cochrane chronology
Hang on to Your Resistance (1974)	Mad Mad World (1991)	Ragged Ass Road (1995)

Singles from Mad Mad World
- 1. "Life Is a Highway" Released: September 20, 1991; 2. "No Regrets" Released: 1991; 3. "Sinking Like a Sunset" Released: 1992; 4. "Mad Mad World" Released: 1992; 5. "Washed Away" Released: 1992; 6. "Bigger Man" Released: 1992

Alternative cover
- International cover

Professional ratings
Review scores
Source	Rating
AllMusic	4/5 stars

Mad Mad World is the second studio album by Canadian rock singer Tom Cochrane, originally released in 1991 in Canada and in the United States on February 17, 1992. The first single from the album, "Life Is a Highway", became a hit in late 1991, reaching number one in Canada and number six on the Billboard Hot 100 in the United States.

The album earned Cochrane four Juno Awards including Album of the Year, Single of the Year, Male Vocalist of the Year, and Songwriter of the Year. In addition, Cochrane won two SOCAN Awards and an ASCAP Award. Mad Mad World achieved a Diamond sales award in Canada for selling more than 1 million copies in Cochrane's native Canada. The album was certified Gold by the RIAA for album sales of more than 500,000 copies in the United States.

The album also included the hits "No Regrets" (No. 3 RPM Charts), "Sinking Like a Sunset" (No. 2 RPM Charts), "Washed Away" (No. 7 RPM Charts), "Bigger Man" and the title track "Mad Mad World". The album was produced by Joe Hardy and was recorded in Memphis, Tennessee and at three different Ontario studios: Metalworks Studios in Mississauga, Hungry Hollow Studio in Georgetown and at Cochrane's cabin in Oakville.

Upon the album's initial releases in the US and Canada, the album featured two different album covers. The original album cover (designed by Ralph Alfonso) was on the initial Canadian release in 1991, while the alternate album cover was on the US release for the album in 1992. The alternate cover is now the main album cover for the album.

On October 28, 2016, Cochrane released an expanded 25th-anniversary edition of the album. Included on the expanded album is "Love Is a Highway", the original demo version of the album's first single, and a second disc featuring a concert recorded on May 14, 1992, on the Mad Mad World Tour in Chicago, Illinois.

== Track listing ==
All tracks are written by Tom Cochrane unless otherwise noted.

Mad Mad World track listing
No.	Title	Writer(s)	Length
1.	"Life Is a Highway"		4:26
2.	"Mad Mad World"		4:56
3.	"No Regrets"		4:38
4.	"Sinking Like a Sunset"	Annette Ducharme	5:45
5.	"Washed Away"		5:20
6.	"Everything Comes Around"		4:32
7.	"The Secret Is to Know When to Stop"	Cochrane, John Cody	4:19
8.	"Brave and Crazy"		5:51
9.	"Bigger Man"		4:26
10.	"Friendly Advice"		4:27
11.	"Get Back Up"		4:39
12.	"Emotional Truth"		5:59
13.	"All the King's Men"		4:33
14.	"Love Is a Highway" (demo version of "Life Is a Highway" – 25th anniversary edition bonus track)

25th anniversary edition: Disc two (Live in Chicago, originally broadcast on Westwood One)
No.	Title	Length
1.	"No Regrets"
2.	"Victory Day"
3.	"Sinking Like a Sunset"
4.	"White Hot"
5.	"Big League"
6.	"Friendly Advice"
7.	"Lunatic Fringe"
8.	"Get Back Up"
9.	"Brave and Crazy"
10.	"Life Is a Highway"
11.	"Mad Mad World"
12.	"Boy Inside the Man"

== Personnel ==
- Tom Cochrane – lead vocals, electric guitar (all tracks); backing vocals (1–3, 5–8, 10–13), acoustic guitar (4, 6–8, 10, 11, 13), slide guitar (2, 3, 8, 9, 11), harmonica (1, 7), organ (5, 13), piano (5, 13), bass (8), synthesizer (12), percussion (13), keyboards (13)
- John Webster – percussion (1, 3–6, 8–11), keyboards (2–4, 6, 10, 12), organ (1, 9), piano (7), horn arrangement (2, 3), drum programming (7)
- Spider Sinnaeve – bass (all tracks)
- Mickey Curry – drums (all tracks)
- Kim Mitchell – lead guitar on "Brave and Crazy"
- Mladen – solo guitar (2), guitar (11)
- Keith Scott – guitar solo on "Sinking Like a Sunset"
- David Gogo – guitar (2, 11)
- Joe Hardy – percussion (2, 4, 8, 9, 11), twelve-string guitar (11)
- Dave Harding – viola (5, 7, 13)
- Molly Johnson – backing vocals (1, 3, 5, 6, 10)
- John Cody – backing vocals (1, 3, 5–8, 10–13)
- Annette Ducharme – backing vocals (4)
- Kathy Cochrane – backing vocals (8)
- Sue Holiday – backing vocals (2)
- Brian Carson – backing vocals (8)
- Great Southern Memphis Section – horns (2, 3)
- Peter Schenkman – cello (7, 13)
- Martin Beaver – violin (7)

Production

- Joe Hardy – producer (except "All the King's Men"), engineering, mixing
- Noel Golden – engineer
- Bob Shindle – engineer
- John Bailey – engineer
- Bob Ludwig – mastering

== Charts ==
Chart (1991–92)	Peak position
Australian Albums (ARIA)	46
Canada Top Albums/CDs (RPM)	1
New Zealand Albums (RMNZ)	8
US Billboard 200	46

== Certifications ==
Region	Certification	Certified units/sales
Canada (Music Canada)	Diamond	1,000,000^{^}
United States (RIAA)	Gold	500,000^{^}
^{^} Shipments figures based on certification alone.
