= The Symphony Sessions (Red Rider album) =

Live album by Tom Cochrane & Red Rider
- Released: December 1989
- Recorded: March 17–18, 1989, Edmonton, Alberta
- Genre: Rock
- Length: 70:33
- Label: Capitol
- Producers: Tom Cochrane & Ken Greer

Tom Cochrane & Red Rider chronology
Victory Day (1988)	The Symphony Sessions (1989)	Ashes to Diamonds (1993)

Singles from The Symphony Sessions
- 1. "White Hot (Live)" Released: 1989

The Symphony Sessions was a live album released in December 1989 by Tom Cochrane & Red Rider. It was the band's seventh and final album.

The album was recorded with the Edmonton Symphony Orchestra at the Northern Alberta Jubilee Auditorium in Edmonton, Alberta. The concert featured a 56-piece orchestra, including six players who had performed with Procol Harum at that band's 1971 performance with the Edmonton Symphony Orchestra.

Following this album, Tom Cochrane pursued a solo career, releasing Mad Mad World in 1991.

== Background and writing ==
The album was recorded by Biff Dawes and the Westwood One mobile unit over two days and featured on one of the "Westwood One live" concert series shows. Two tracks recorded during these sessions were featured on the Westwood One concert but did not make the final album cut: "Ocean Blues (Emotion Blue)" and "The Untouchable One". Both songs are from the 1986 self-titled Tom Cochrane & Red Rider album.

Tom Cochrane explained the idea behind the album: "When we put our songs together... Kenny (Greer) has sort of a classical background, as I do... we never had the budget or the means to do it with these kind of players, plus you want to keep it intact as a band, so we've always done it with synthesizers and whatever we had at hand, so it's nice to go in with a real complement of players and have them contribute like they did. In our music, "Lunatic Fringe," for example, there are parts implied that we thought should be transposed from keyboard to orchestral instruments, and then in other areas we gave George (Blondheim) carte blanche and said, 'Do what you want, add some creative input'. "

The concerts were recorded live with a 56-piece orchestra and then mixed down at the Metalworks Studios in Toronto.

== Track listing ==
All tracks are written by Tom Cochrane unless otherwise noted.

LP release
No.	Title	Writer(s)	Length
1.	"Light in the Tunnel" (instrumental)		2:28
2.	"Human Race"		3:48
3.	"Can't Turn Back"		10:22
4.	"Napoleon Sheds His Skin"		6:19
5.	"White Hot"	Cochrane, Ken Greer	6:18
6.	"Avenue 'A'"		3:57
7.	"Bird on a Wire"	Leonard Cohen	3:21
8.	"Boy Inside the Man"		9:49
9.	"Lunatic Fringe"		5:01
10.	"The Next Life" (New studio track)		3:41

CD and cassette release
No.	Title	Writer(s)	Length
1.	"Light in the Tunnel" (instrumental)		2:28
2.	"Human Race"		3:48
3.	"Can't Turn Back"		10:22
4.	"Napoleon Sheds His Skin"		6:19
5.	"White Hot"	Cochrane, Greer	6:18
6.	"Big League"		5:37
7.	"Calling America"		4:53
8.	"Avenue 'A'"		3:57
9.	"Bird on a Wire"	Cohen	3:21
10.	"Boy Inside the Man"		9:49
11.	"Lunatic Fringe"		5:01
12.	"Good Times"		4:53
13.	"The Next Life" (New studio track)		3:41

== Album credits ==
=== Personnel ===
- Tom Cochrane - vocals, guitars
- Ken Greer - guitars
- John Webster - keyboards
- Ken "Spider" Sinnaeve - bass
- Randall Coryell - drums
- Peter Mueller - guitars

Additional personnel

- Edmonton Symphony Orchestra - orchestral performances

=== Production ===
- George Blondheim - arrangement, conductor
- Bill Dawes - engineer
- Steve Rinkoff - producer on "The Next Life", mixing
- Hugh Cooper - additional engineering
- Brett Zilahi - assistant engineer

== Charts ==
Chart (1989–90)	Peak position
Canada Top Albums/CDs (RPM)	25

== Certifications ==
Region	Certification	Certified units/sales
Canada (Music Canada)	Platinum	100,000^{^}
^{^} Shipments figures based on certification alone.
