= Xray Sierra =

Studio album by Tom Cochrane
- Released: February 2, 1999
- Genre: Heartland rock
- Length: 49:09
- Label: EMI Music Canada
- Producers: Tom Cochrane, John Webster

Tom Cochrane chronology
Songs of a Circling Spirit (1997)	Xray Sierra (1999)	No Stranger (2006)

Singles from X-Ray Sierra
- 1. "I Wonder" Released: 1999; 2. "Willie Dixon Said" Released: 1999; 3. "Stonecutter's Arms" Released: 1999; 4. "Heartbreak Girl" Released: 1999

Professional ratings
Review scores
Source	Rating
Allmusic	2.5/5 stars

Xray Sierra is the fourth solo studio album by Red Rider frontman Tom Cochrane, released in February 1999. It featured the hits "I Wonder", "Willie Dixon Said", "Heartbreak Girl" and "Stonecutters Arms". Cochrane received a Best Male Vocalist Juno nomination for Xray Sierra. The album was recorded at Metalworks Studios in Toronto and Hipposonic Studios in Vancouver and was produced by Cochrane and John Webster.

== Track listing ==
All tracks are written by Tom Cochrane.

No.	Title	Length
1.	"I Wonder"	3:44
2.	"Stonecutter's Arms"	4:54
3.	"Art of Listening"	4:17
4.	"Heartbreak Girl"	4:21
5.	"Willie Dixon Said"	4:06
6.	"Marianne and Lenny"	5:25
7.	"Beautiful Day"	4:54
8.	"Windy Night in Fall"	4:50
9.	"Piece of Your Soul"	4:11
10.	"This Is the World"	4:08
11.	"Northern Frontier"	4:19

== Charts ==
Chart (1999)	Peak position
Canada Top Albums/CDs (RPM)	80
