= Ragged Ass Road (album) =

Studio album by Tom Cochrane
- Released: October 1995
- Recorded: 1995
- Genre: Heartland rock
- Length: 53:53
- Label: Capitol
- Producers: Tom Cochrane, John Webster

Tom Cochrane chronology
Mad Mad World (1991)	Ragged Ass Road (1995)	Songs of a Circling Spirit (1997)

Singles from Ragged Ass Road
- 1. "I Wish You Well" Released: October 1995; 2. "Wildest Dreams" Released: 1995; 3. "Dreamer's Dream" Released: 1996; 4. "Crawl" Released: 1996

Professional ratings
Review scores
Source	Rating
AllMusic	3/5 stars

Ragged Ass Road is the third solo studio album by Red Rider frontman Tom Cochrane, released in October 1995. The album was named for Ragged Ass Road, a street in Yellowknife, Northwest Territories. Songs from the album include "I Wish You Well", which became the first Canadian song to debut at #1 on the RPM Canadian Singles Charts, as well as three other Top 20 hits in Canada: "Wildest Dreams" (No. 5 RPM Canadian Charts), "Dreamer's Dream" (No. 4 RPM Canadian Charts) and "Crawl" (No. 11 RPM Canadian Charts). Ragged Ass Road earned two Juno award nominations and achieved Platinum sales status in Canada. The album was produced by Cochrane and John Webster at Metalworks Studios and Ragged Ass Road Studios.

== Track listing ==
All tracks are written by Tom Cochrane unless otherwise noted.

No.	Title	Writer(s)	Length
1.	"I Wish You Well"		4:24
2.	"Wildest Dreams"		4:12
3.	"Just Scream"		4:53
4.	"Paper Tigers"		3:56
5.	"Crawl"	Bill Bell, Cochrane	4:15
6.	"Ragged Ass Road"		4:45
7.	"Flowers in the Concrete"	Annette Ducharme	4:02
8.	"Dreamer's Dream"		4:57
9.	"Message (Rise Up Again)"		4:33
10.	"Best Waste of Time"	Ducharme	4:36
11.	"Will of the Gun"	Ducharme	4:46
12.	"Song Before I Leave"		4:34

== Personnel ==
- Tom Cochrane – guitars, harmonica, mandolin, vocals
- John Webster – keyboards, engineer
- Ken "Spider" Sinnaeve – bass
- Alex Lifeson – guitar
- Bill Bell – guitars (acoustic and electric)
- Annette Ducharme – guitar (acoustic), backing vocals
- Dick Smith – percussion
- Gregor Beresford – percussion, drums
- Evanne Cochrane – vocals
- Molly Johnson – backing vocals
- Saffron Henderson – backing vocals

== Charts ==
Chart (1995–96)	Peak position
Australian Albums (ARIA)	167
Canada Top Albums/CDs (RPM)	16

== Certifications ==
Region	Certification	Certified units/sales
Canada (Music Canada)	Platinum	100,000^{^}
^{^} Shipments figures based on certification alone.
