= Ragged Ass Road (Yellowknife) =

Unpaved street in Yellowknife, capital of Canada's Northwest Territories

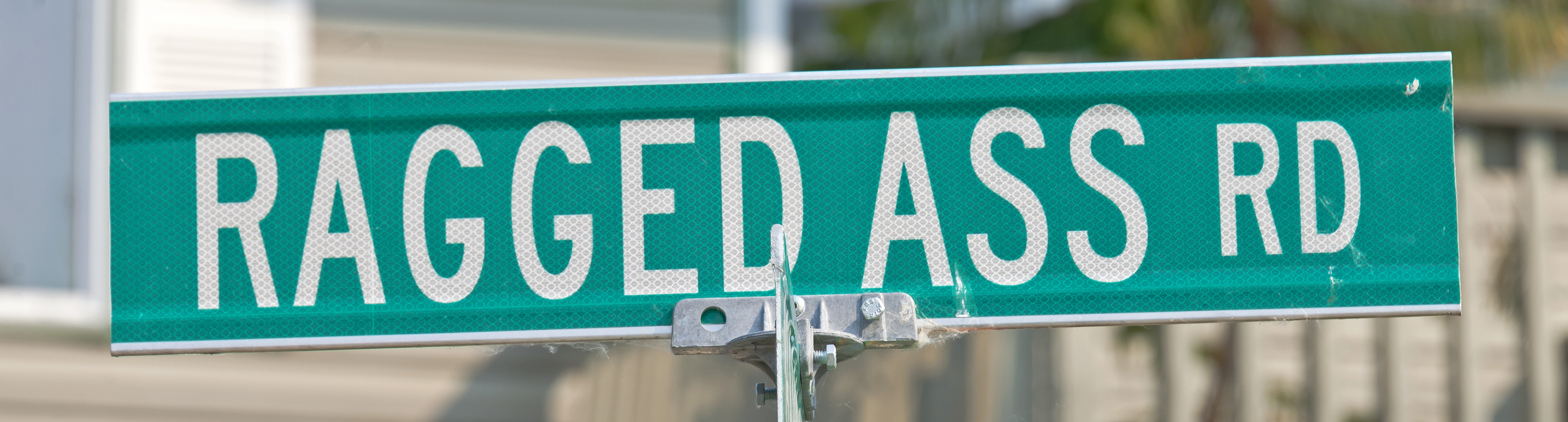

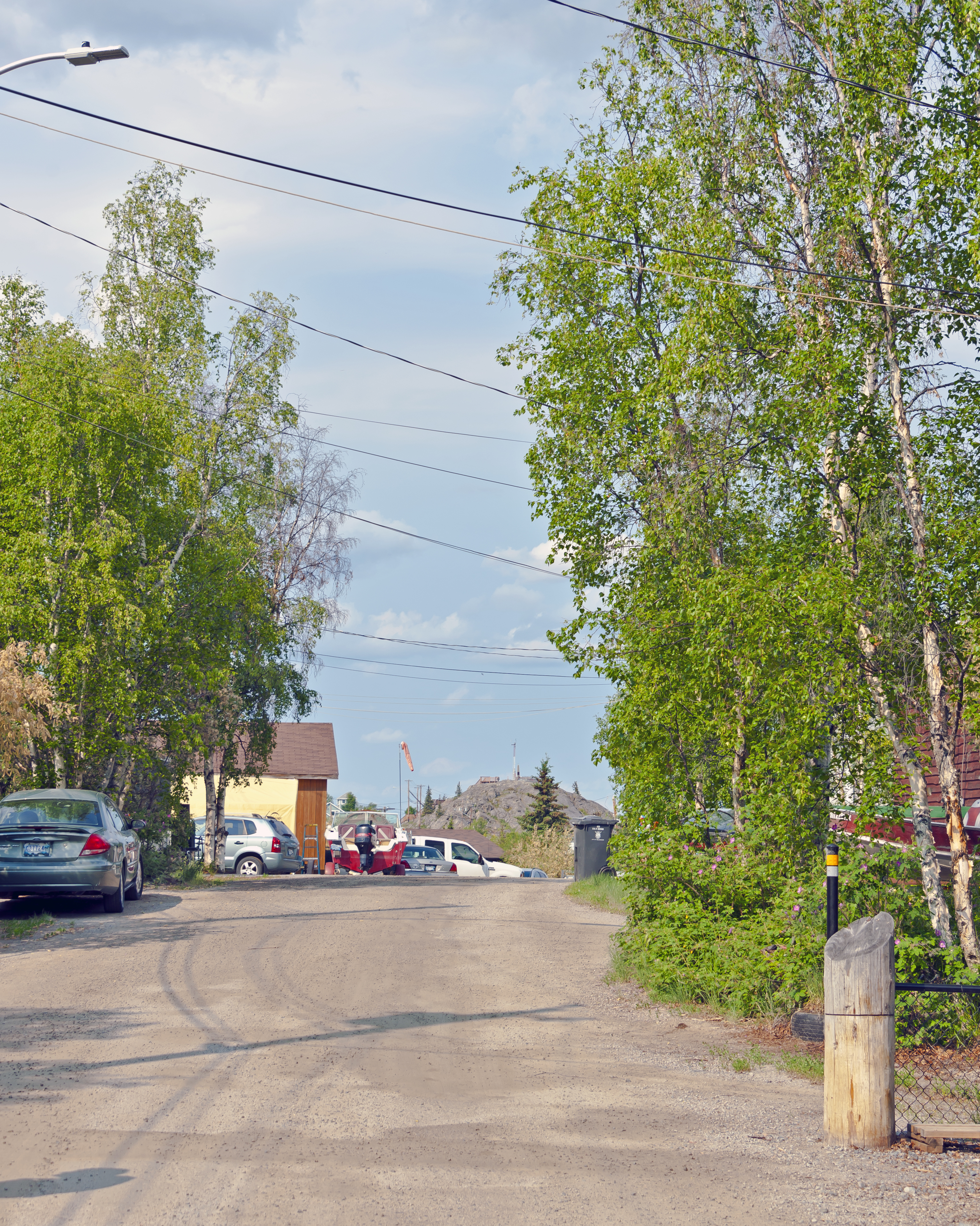
- View north from Brock Drive, 2015
- Former name: Privy Road
- Namesake: Poverty experienced by local prospectors
- Type: Dirt road
- Maintained by: City of Yellowknife
- Length: 150 m (490 ft)
- Addresses: 3902–3920
- Location: Yellowknife, NT, Canada
- Postal code: X1A 2T4
- Coordinates: 62.46063°N 114.35256°W
- South end: Brock Drive
- North end: Hamilton Drive

Other
- Known for: Unique name

Ragged Ass Road is a short unpaved residential street in the Old Town section of Yellowknife, Northwest Territories, Canada. Its name started as a joke in 1970 by resident Lou Rocher, who owned much of the property along it at the time, and his friends. At the time the street had been known as "Privy Road" due to the large number of outhouses along it. When a difficult prospecting season yielded little income, convincing residents that they were "ragged ass broke", they decided that that should be the name of the street.

While widely used, the name was somewhat controversial. It was not officially recognized by the city with signposts until the mid-2010s, after Rocher's death. It has been described as one of the most famous streets in Canada. Singer Tom Cochrane named his 1995 album after it, including a song about the street.

== Street ==
Ragged Ass Road is in a residential area midway between the intersection of Franklin (50th) Avenue, Yellowknife's main street, and School Draw Avenue, its lake shore road, and Yellowknife Bay on the north arm of Great Slave Lake. The terrain is flat, at approximately 160 metres (520 ft) in elevation, reflecting the proximity of the lake. The neighborhood is at the south end of the city's Old Town, on a peninsula projecting into the lake's Yellowknife Bay.

The southern terminus is at Brock Drive, three blocks east of School Draw. From there it follows a north-northeast heading, bending more to the northeast midway along its 150-metre (490 ft) length, then back to its original heading as it reaches its north terminus at Hamilton Drive. Along with its neighboring streets it is unpaved for its entire length.

With the exception of one large bedrock outcrop in the middle of the west side of the street, all the lots along the street are developed with wood frame residences of modern construction and associated outbuildings. Some small deciduous trees grow among them. (In her novel Bones Are Forever, American writer Kathy Reichs described the prevailing architectural style of Ragged Ass as "northern hodgepodge".) Addresses are in the range of 3901–3921, following Yellowknife's grid-based numbering system. Its postal code is X1A 2T4.

== History ==
The construction date of Ragged Ass Road is unknown. Yellowknife was significantly settled only after a 1935 gold rush. After a few years, development was interrupted by World War II, only to resume afterwards. At that time most development was on the peninsula, in the area known today as Old Town. The road may have started as a narrow alley where residents cut wood to building the barges that carried freight to and from the growing settlement across Great Slave Lake. By 1957, when Saskatchewan native Lou Rocher settled in the area, it existed and was known unofficially as Privy Road due to the many outhouses along it.

Rocher made his living through several vocations, selling firewood, commercial fishing, but primarily prospecting. He eventually came to live on Privy Road, where he owned several lots on the street. On them he built homes and cabins, often letting people in need live there.

One night near the end of 1970, in which he and fellow prospectors had worked hard but found far less, he was drinking with some of them in the family Quonset hut. Reflecting on their circumstances, Rocher joked that the street should be named "Ragged Ass Road" since they were all "ragged ass broke". "[My father] felt he should be able to name it because he owned six of the nine lots on the road and he thought he could name it appropriately", his son recalled later. The men put up a sign that night. The term's use as a place name might not have been original. There was reportedly a Ragged Ass Mine on the lake in earlier years.

The name caught on, if not formally. Officially the city still considered the street to have no name, but Rocher made his own signs, replacing them after visiting tourists stole them. Eventually they were welded to their posts, and gift shops in the city started selling replicas. During the 1980s, Rocher clashed with Yellowknife's municipal government over a survey of the area. At one point he even blocked the street off to keep city employees away.

In 1995 former Red Rider lead singer Tom Cochrane named his third album Ragged Ass Road after the street. The title track of the album described a place "Where the shore fires burn out on a new frontier" and had the chorus "Oh did you find the midnight sun" (Note: While the midnight sun is often associated with Yellowknife, it is south of the Arctic Circle and only experiences white nights, where the sun dips just below the horizon for a few hours of twilight in the summertime, rather than the full midnight sun.) Down on Ragged Ass Road". It added to the road's allure as a tourist attraction, but the city still demurred from making the name official.

The city was not unique in its reluctance to embrace the name despite its popularity. In 2004, a small town in the U.S. state of Ohio mailed a Ragged Ass Road sign back to Yellowknife's city government after having confiscated it from a homeowner as inappropriate for public display. Eight years later a British Columbia man flying out of Vancouver on WestJet with a Ragged Ass Road T-shirt was told by a flight attendant to either cover it up or turn it inside out for the duration of the flight since the airline was "family-friendly". He chose the former option, but when the incident made national news, WestJet apologized. When it did so, it posted to its Instagram account a photo of a Ragged Ass Road sign that had been on the office wall of its chief executive officer, Gregg Saretsky, for two years. Yellowknife city officials made it a point to meet with WestJet officials to come to a common understanding: the T-shirts are a tourist draw.

The year before, crime novelist and forensic anthropologist Kathy Reichs, a producer of the American television series Bones, had attended the NorthWords literary festival in Yellowknife. She liked the city so much she set part of her next novel, Bones Are Forever, there. In one scene her main character, Temperance Brennan, a forensic anthropologist like her creator, trails a suspect from downtown Yellowknife to Ragged Ass Road on a cold morning, giving her a chance to describe it:

A sign on a rock said Ragged Ass Road. That's one you'd never see on the Queen City (Note: A reference to the American city of Charlotte, North Carolina, where Brennan, like Reichs, lives for part of the year. A few paragraphs before this, Brennan had noted how 50th Avenue's apparent sudden change of name to Franklin Avenue north of downtown Yellowknife was a phenomenon she was used to from Charlotte's streets.) map ... The neighborhood was residential, with browned-out grass hugging up to the road and utility wires hanging low overhead. I smelled fishy water and bracken mud and sensed a lake nearby ...The newer homes looked like they'd been assembled from mail-order kits. Aluminum siding. Prefab windows. Faux-colonial shutters and doors ... The older ones resembled cottages at a hippie summer camp. Unstained frame exteriors painted with murals or images taken from nature. Metal downspouts and smokestacks. Whirligigs, plastic animals, and ceramic gnomes in the yards or topping the fences ... Every house had at least one outbuilding, a rusted tank, and a mound of firewood.

According to Murtaza Haider, professor and director of Toronto Metropolitan University's Institute of Housing and Mobility, it is claimed that this street is an example of a "poorly named street ... [that] create[s] negative shift in market value." (Note: "Residents of Canada's Dingle Bingle Hill Terrace, Cheapside Street, Ragged Ass Road and Bastard Ward consider yourselves warned: There is a small but noteworthy negative effect between a badly named street and the perceived market value of homes or businesses that reside on it ..." Conversely, a well-regarded street name, e.g. Bloor Street in Toronto, Ontario, Canada, can have a measurable positive effect on perceived value and price.)

"Ragged Ass" street sign replicas are sold in the area. Nevertheless, the signs have been stolen so frequently that the city has had them welded to their posts.

Lou Rocher died in May 2013 and was remembered around Yellowknife most prominently for giving Ragged Ass Road its name. Despite that, his family noted, at that time the city still had not installed official street signs with the name. As of 2015, there are city signs at both ends of the road.
