= No Stranger =

No Stranger may refer to:

- No Stranger (Tom Cochrane album), 2006
- No Stranger (Natalie Grant album), 2020
