= Breaking Curfew =

Studio album by Red Rider
- Released: September 1984
- Recorded: November 1983 – February 1984
- Genre: Rock
- Length: 37:18
- Label: Capitol
- Producers: David Tickle, Tom Cochrane, Ken Greer (except tracks 1 and 8: produced by Tom Cochrane and Ken Greer)

Red Rider chronology
Neruda (1983)	Breaking Curfew (1984)	Tom Cochrane and Red Rider (1986)

Singles from Breaking Curfew
- 1. "Young Thing, Wild Dreams (Rock Me)" Released: 1984; 2. "Breaking Curfew" Released: 1984

Professional ratings
Review scores
Source	Rating
Allmusic	2/5 stars

Breaking Curfew is the fourth studio album by the Canadian rock band Red Rider, released in 1984 (see 1984 in music). The album was recorded and mixed at Metalworks Studios and E.S.P. Studio in Toronto, Ontario and Startling Studios in England.

Breaking Curfew reached #137 on Billboard's 200 chart in 1984 assisted by the single "Young Thing, Wild Dreams (Rock Me)" which hit #44 on the Canadian charts and #71 on Billboard's Hot 100 chart. "Breaking Curfew" also hit #93 in Canada.

== Track listing ==
All tracks are written by Tom Cochrane except where noted.

No.	Title	Writer(s)	Length
1.	"Whipping Boy"		3:12
2.	"Young Thing, Wild Dreams (Rock Me)"		3:32
3.	"One Way Out"	Cochrane, Ken Greer, Goldenberg	3:53
4.	"Among the Ruins (I'll Be Here)"		4:34
5.	"Breaking Curfew"		3:43
6.	"Someone's Watching"		4:00
7.	"Shake Monster"		4:45
8.	"Beacon Hill"		4:51
9.	"Hold Tight"		4:38

== Personnel ==
- Tom Cochrane – lead vocals, guitars, keyboards, programming
- Ken Greer – guitars, keyboards, backing vocals
- Rob Baker – drums, percussion
- Jeff Jones – bass guitar, backing vocals

with

- John Webster – keyboards, programming

Additional personnel

- Steve Sexton – keyboards
- Earle Seymour – saxophone
- Rough Maids – backing vocals on "Shake Monster"
- Norman Moore – art direction and design
- Beverly Parker – photography

== Charts ==
Chart (1984)	Peak position
Canada Top Albums/CDs (RPM)	45
US Billboard 200	137
