= The Symphony Sessions =

The Symphony Sessions may refer to:

- The Symphony Sessions (Red Rider album), 1989
- The Symphony Sessions (The Manhattan Transfer album), 2006
