= Tom Cochrane and Red Rider =

Studio album by Tom Cochrane & Red Rider
- Released: May 7, 1986
- Studios: Rockfield Studios, Wales; Cedartree Studios, Kitchener
- Genre: Rock
- Length: 44:21
- Label: Capitol
- Producers: Patrick Moran (except tracks 7 and 10: produced by Tom Cochrane, Ken Greer, Fraser Hill, Rick Hutt)

Tom Cochrane & Red Rider chronology
Breaking Curfew (1984)	Tom Cochrane and Red Rider (1986)	Over 60 Minutes with Red Rider (1987)

Singles from Tom Cochrane and Red Rider
- 1. "Boy Inside the Man" Released: 1986; 2. "The Untouchable Ones" Released: 1986; 3. "One More Time (Some Old Habits)" Released: 1987; 4. "Ocean Blues (Emotion Blue)" Released: 1987

Professional ratings
Review scores
Source	Rating
Allmusic	2/5 stars

Tom Cochrane and Red Rider is the fifth studio album by the Canadian rock band Tom Cochrane & Red Rider, released in 1986 The album earned Cochrane two Juno Awards for Composer of the Year and Group of the Year. A remastered version was released by EMI in 2004.

== Commercial performance ==
The album reached #116 on the U.S. Billboard 200 chart in 1986. In Canada, "Boy Inside the Man" reached #27, "The Untouchable One" hit #70, "One More Time (Some Old Habits)" hit #85, and "Ocean Blues (Emotion Blue)" made #88. The album was certified Platinum in Canada.

== Track listing ==
All tracks are written by Tom Cochrane unless otherwise noted.

No.	Title	Writer(s)	Length
1.	"Boy Inside the Man"		5:17
2.	"Love Under Fire"	Cochrane, Ken Greer	4:48
3.	"The Untouchable One"		4:31
4.	"Lasting Song"		4:55
5.	"Citizen Cain"		3:32
6.	"Ashes to Diamonds"		4:39
7.	"The Loading"	Cochrane, Greer	3:36
8.	"Ocean Blues (Emotion Blue)"		4:39
9.	"River of Stone"		3:55
10.	"One More Time (Some Old Habits)"	Cochrane, Greer	4:26

== Personnel ==
- Tom Cochrane - lead vocals, guitars, bass on "The Loading" and "One More Time"
- Ken Greer - guitars, steel guitar, keyboards, backing vocals
- John Webster - keyboards

Additional personnel

- Ken Sinnaeve - bass
- Graham Broad - drums, percussion
- Jorn Anderson - drums on "The Loading" and "One More Time"
- Paul Martinea - bass on "Love Under Fire"
- John Johnson - saxophone
- Wendy Davis - backing vocals
- Billy Pilgrim - backing vocals
- Mission Singers - backing vocals

== Charts ==
Chart (1986)	Peak position
Canada Top Albums/CDs (RPM)	20
US Billboard 200	112

== Certifications ==
Region	Certification	Certified units/sales
Canada (Music Canada)	Platinum	100,000^{^}
^{^} Shipments figures based on certification alone.
