= William Peter Randall =

Peter Randall
- Born: William Peter Randall; November 27, 1964 (age 61)
- Origin: Barrie, Ontario, Canada
- Genres: Rock, Pop
- Occupations: Singer, songwriter, politician
- Instruments: voice, guitar, trumpet, piano
- Years active: 1985–1995

William Peter Randall (born November 27, 1964, in Barrie, Ontario) is a Canadian musician and municipal politician.

While studying recorded music production and general arts and science at Fanshawe College in London, Ontario, he hinted at a later political career by serving as General Arts and Sciences Member At Large. He then moved to Toronto to pursue acting and a music career.

His first release with his band Timeline was entitled Living on the Timeline and released on Random Records in 1986. Two solo albums followed, Better Times in 1988 and Slapped in the Face by a Rainbow in 1990. Some of these tracks were featured on New Stuff new artist samplers.

With a new band in tow, Peter Randall and the Raindogs, he travelled and made multiple appearances on shows such as Citytv Toronto's Breakfast Television and Lunch Television. Their debut self-titled release was produced by Ken Greer of Red Rider fame at Metalworks Studios in Mississauga and released in 1994.

Randall's travels and humanitarian work have led him from Israeli Kibbutz to Goa, India seniors homes, animal shelters and kindergartens and Nicaraguan schools outside Managua, where he worked as a volunteer with The Canadian Light Brigade.

Settling down in wine country in Lincoln, Ontario, Randall was first elected as a town Alderman in 2000. He was then elected as Councillor for Ward Four in 2006.

In 2004 he co-wrote the track "Love Crime" with fellow Fanshawe College alumna Emm Gryner for CBC Radio's All for a Song CD.

In 2017 he wrote "All The Same" for Momentum Special Needs Choir who performed it at their year-end gala.

== Discography ==
- 1986 – Timeline – Living on the Timeline
- 1988 – Peter Randall – Slapped in the Face by a Rainbow
- 1989 – Various – Horizons '89
- 1990 – Peter Randall – Better Times
- 1994 – The Raindogs – The Raindogs

== Video singles ==
- 1990 – Grow Old With Me
- 1990 – What Do You Want
- 1995 – Pity?
