= Norco shootout =

1980 armed confrontation between police and bank robbers in Norco, California

Coordinates: 33.9246312°N 117.559306°W

- Location: 2895 Hamner Avenue, Norco, California, United States
- Date: May 9, 1980; 3:40 p.m. (UTC-7)
- Target: A branch of Security Pacific Bank
- Attack type: Bank robbery, ambush, shootout
- Weapons: Colt AR-15 5.56×45 rifle G3 7.62×51 semi-automatic rifle HK 93 semi-automatic rifles Pump-action shotguns Handguns; IED; Katana
- Deaths: 3 (including 2 perpetrators)
- Injuries: 11
- Perpetrators: Belisario Delgado (killed); Manuel Delgado (killed); Christopher Gregory Harven; Russell Harven; George Wayne Smith

The Norco shootout was an armed confrontation between five heavily armed bank robbers and deputies of the Riverside County and San Bernardino County sheriffs' departments in Norco, California, United States, on May 9, 1980. Two of the five perpetrators and a sheriff's deputy were killed; eight other law enforcement officers, a civilian, and two other perpetrators were wounded; and massive amounts of gunfire damaged at least 30 police cars, a police helicopter, and numerous nearby homes and businesses.

At approximately 3:40 p.m., five men armed with shotguns, a G3 rifle, HK93s, handguns, AR-15s, a katana and an improvised explosive device robbed the Norco branch of Security Pacific Bank. Deputies of the Riverside County Sheriff's Department responding to the bank robbery call confronted the perpetrators outside the bank and a shootout ensued, killing one perpetrator. The perpetrators then stole a vehicle in the bank parking lot and fled the scene, leading police on a 25-mile (40 km) car chase into neighboring San Bernardino County. Riverside County deputies were joined in the pursuit by officers of other area law enforcement agencies, including the California Highway Patrol and San Bernardino County Sheriff's Department. The perpetrators then ambushed the pursuing deputies and engaged them in another shootout in unincorporated San Bernardino County near Lytle Creek before escaping into a wooded area in the foothills of the San Bernardino Mountains.

Two days later, three of the four surviving perpetrators were arrested in the area of the ambush; the fourth killed himself before he could be captured by police. The three who were arrested were convicted of 46 felonies and sentenced to life imprisonment without the possibility of parole.

== Robbery and pursuit ==
At 3:40 p.m. on May 9, 1980, four robbers stormed into the bank and forced the tellers to hand over $20,000 in cash (equivalent to $78,000 in 2025), while the fifth robber kept watch outside. Unbeknownst to the robbers, an employee at a different bank across the street spotted them entering the bank and called the police.

Riverside County Sheriff Deputy Glyn Bolasky was the first officer to arrive at the scene, having been sitting in his car at a red light across from the bank when he was informed of the robbery. As he pulled up, one of the robbers left outside with their getaway van radioed his partners inside the bank and said "We've been spotted! Let's go! Let's go!" The robbers exited the bank and began to fire on Bolasky's police cruiser, blowing out the windshield and forcing Bolasky to throw the vehicle into reverse, crashing into another car in the street. Taking cover behind his vehicle, Bolasky returned fire with a 12-gauge shotgun. The gunmen got into the van and once all five men were inside, they attempted to flee the scene, continuing to shoot at Bolasky. As the van sped away, a pellet from Bolasky's shotgun struck the driver, Belisario Delgado, just behind his right ear, killing him and sending the van crashing into a telephone pole guy-wire. The four remaining robbers then exited the vehicle and fired over 200 rounds at Bolasky, putting 47 bullet holes in his cruiser. Bolasky was hit five times; in the face, upper left shoulder, both forearms and the left elbow.

By this time, Deputies Charles Hille and Andy Delgado (no relation to killed robber brothers Belisario and Manuel) had arrived at the scene. While Officer Delgado engaged the robbers in a gunfight, Hille managed to evacuate Bolasky in his cruiser and transport him to a nearby hospital. The robbers continued to fire at other officers arriving at the scene and attempted to escape again by commandeering a truck (owned by Michael C. Linville) stopped at an intersection in front of the bank. As the four surviving robbers led a police pursuit, they shot at the pursuing officers and threw homemade bombs out of the back of the truck. Overall, they damaged 33 police vehicles, including a San Bernardino County Sheriff's police helicopter piloted by Lt. Jon Gibson accompanied by Observer Sgt. Ron Hittle, which was disabled and forced to land.

The suspects pulled far ahead of the pursuing police officers on a rural road, and stopped to ambush the deputies as they approached a dead end. Deputy James Evans caught up with the suspects first and was immediately met with a volley of bullets. He returned fire from behind his patrol car but was shot in the head and killed. The next-arriving officers, armed with only .38-Special revolvers and 12-gauge shotguns, were outgunned, but were soon joined by San Bernardino County Sheriff's Deputy D. J. McCarty, who was armed with an M16 and riding in a patrol car driven by Deputy James McPheron. Shortly after he engaged the robbers with his rifle, they fled the scene, running into the wooded area of Lytle Creek. "There would have been a lot more dead cops on the road if not for that weapon," said Riverside County Sheriff's Deputy Rolf Parkes. "After their capture, the suspects stated their intent was to fight to the death."

== Aftermath and prosecution of the perpetrators ==
The next day, three of the gunmen were arrested without incident by a group of law enforcement officers under the command of San Bernardino Assistant Sheriff Floyd Tidwell. The fourth, Manuel Delgado, was hit four times in a shootout with a 65-man Los Angeles County Sheriff's Department SWAT team in the foothills and killed.

During the previous day's shootout, Chris Harven was hit once in the back by Deputy Evans, while suspect George Smith was hit twice in the left leg and groin by Deputy Bolasky. One civilian, 12-year-old Robert Oglesby who was taking a bicycle ride with his friends, was hit in the finger, though the wound was minor. In all, eight officers had been wounded.

- Riverside County Sheriff Deputy Glyn Bolasky was hit five times in the face, upper left shoulder, both forearms and the left elbow.
- Riverside County Sheriff Deputy Darrell Reed was hit once in the back of his left knee.
- Riverside County Sheriff Deputy Rolf Parkes was hit three times in the head, face and arm.
- Riverside County Sheriff Deputy Herman Brown was hit in the left lower leg by multiple bullet fragments.
- Riverside County Sheriff Deputy Ken McDaniels was hit once in the right shoulder.
- Riverside County Sheriff Deputy Tony Reynard was hit once in the left elbow.
- California Highway Patrol officer Bill Crowe was hit once in the right arm.
- San Bernardino County Sheriff's Deputy D. J. McCarty was hit once in the right elbow.

The three surviving suspects, George Wayne Smith and brothers Christopher and Russell Harven, were convicted of 46 felonies and sentenced to life in prison without parole.

Deputy Bolasky recovered from his wounds sustained in the shootout and was awarded several decorations for his actions. He later became an officer in the United States Air Force, rising to the rank of lieutenant colonel and serving as an electronic warfare officer.

== Legacy ==
In response to the fact that the suspects' weapons were superior to that of the police responding to the incident, the San Bernardino County Sheriff's Department equipped their deputies with Ruger Mini-14s chambered in .223 Remington as well as the M16 and AR-15. Police departments began purchasing more powerful firearms and equipping surveillance helicopters with weapons. Following the robbery, the Irvine Police Department used the case to create a training video. Though it occurred in 1980, it is still used in training law enforcement personnel in anti-terrorism and survival. As impetus for acquiring new weapons and as a training framework for anticipating violence, the Norco shootout contributed to improving of officer survival training for police forces across the United States.

A street in Norco was named "Deputy Evans Drive" to honor James Evans, the officer who was killed during the shootout.

== Film ==
A film, Rapid Fire (2006), was made about the shootout. Another film, entitled Norco, was announced in 2015. Producers Marc Butan and Mason Novick were developing the film, and Mark Romanek was in talks to direct.

== Book ==
Norco '80: The True Story of the Most Spectacular Bank Robbery In American History, by Peter Houlahan (2019 book) is a documented account of the bank robbery, pursuit and 14-month death penalty trial that followed.

== Podcast ==
In January 2021, LAist Studio from Southern California Public Radio released the ten-part podcast "Norco ‘80: God, Guns, Survivalism and the Bank Robbery that Changed Policing Forever," based on Houlahan's book.

Comedians Dave Anthony and Gareth Reynolds examine the 1980 Norco bank robbery and shootout on their podcast, The Dollop.

== See also ==
- North Hollywood shootout
- 1986 FBI Miami shootout
- Newhall incident
- 2009 shootings of Oakland police officers
- List of homicides in California
