= Victory Day (album) =

Studio album by Tom Cochrane & Red Rider
- Released: September 1988
- Genres: Heartland rock; AOR
- Label: Capitol
- Producers: Don Gehman (except tracks 3, 6, 7 and 9 produced by Don Gehman, Tom Cochrane, Ken Greer and John Webster)

Tom Cochrane & Red Rider chronology
Over 60 Minutes with Red Rider (1987)	Victory Day (1988)	The Symphony Sessions (1989)

Singles from Victory Day
- 1. "Big League" Released: 1988; 2. "Calling America" Released: 1989; 3. "Good Times" Released: 1989; 4. "Victory Day" Released: 1989; 5. "Different Drummer" Released: 1989

Professional ratings
Review scores
Source	Rating
Allmusic	2.5/5 stars

Victory Day is the sixth and final studio album by Canadian rock band Tom Cochrane & Red Rider, which was released in September 1988. Victory Day sold more than 200,000 copies in Canada and became Cochrane's first double platinum album with Red Rider. The album garnered Cochrane and Red Rider three Juno Award nominations. Victory Day was the third best-selling Cancon album in Canada of 1989.

== Track listing ==
All tracks are written by Tom Cochrane unless otherwise noted.

No.	Title	Writer(s)	Length
1.	"Big League"		4:36
2.	"Victory Day"		4:24
3.	"Sons Beat Down"		4:27
4.	"Different Drummer"		3:37
5.	"Good Times"		3:59
6.	"Saved by the Dawn"	Ken Greer	2:46
7.	"Calling America"		4:14
8.	"Vacation (In My Mind)"	Cochrane, Greer, John Webster	4:25
9.	"Good Man (Feeling Bad)"		4:07
10.	"Not So Far Away"		4:16

== Personnel ==
Tom Cochrane and Red Rider

- Tom Cochrane - vocals, guitars, keyboards
- Ken Greer - guitars, steel guitar, bass, backing vocals
- Peter Mueller – guitar
- John Webster - keyboards, bass
- Ken "Spider" Sinnaeve - bass
- Randall Coryell - drums

Additional musicians

- Mickey Currey – drums
- Denny Fongheiser – drums
- Carroll-Sue Hill – backing vocals

== Charts ==
Chart (1989)	Peak position
Australian Albums (ARIA)	145
Canada Top Albums/CDs (RPM)	31
US Billboard 200	144

== Certifications ==
Region	Certification	Certified units/sales
Canada (Music Canada)	2× Platinum	200,000^{^}
^{^} Shipments figures based on certification alone.
