= Rapid Fire (2006 film) =

- DVD artwork
- Genre: Action
- Based on: 1980 Norco shootout
- Written by: Robert Carney
- Directed by: Kari Skogland
- Starring: David Cubitt; Kristin Lehman; Jason Gedrick; Jessica Steen; Emy Aneke
- Composers: John Webster and Annette Ducharme
- Country of origin: Canada
- Original language: English

Production
- Executive producers: Stan Brooks; John Fasano; Chad Oakes
- Producer: Evan Tylor
- Cinematography: Adam Sliwinski
- Editor: James Ilecic
- Running time: 90 minutes
- Production companies: Nomadic Pictures; Norco Productions Inc.

Original release
- Network: USA Network (U.S.)
- Release: 2006

Rapid Fire is a 2006 action television film starring Jessica Steen and David Cubitt based on the 1980 Norco shootout. While in production it was titled Norco.

== Plot ==
In Norco, California, four men plot a bank robbery using heavy weapons to intimidate the public and the police force. However, one employee activates the silent alarm in the police station, and the criminals are chased by the police. In despair, in Lytle Creek, the robbers fire about 2,000 rounds and kill one policeman. In the ambush, robbers hit eight others. The offenders damage many police cars and one helicopter. L.A.S.D. SWAT conduct a manhunt and neutralise one robber. In the end, the one survivor was sentenced to life without parole.
