= Don't Fight It (album) =

Studio album by Red Rider
- Released: October 23, 1979
- Studios: Sunset Sound (Hollywood); Clover Records (Hollywood); Eastern (Toronto); Manta Sound (Toronto)
- Genre: Pop rock
- Length: 38:51
- Label: Capitol
- Producer: Michael James Jackson

Red Rider chronology
Don't Fight It (1979)	As Far as Siam (1981)

Singles from Don't Fight It
- 1. "White Hot" Released: 1980; 2. "Don't Fight It" Released: 1980

Professional ratings
Review scores
Source	Rating
AllMusic	3/5 stars

Don't Fight It is the debut album by Canadian rock band Red Rider, released in 1979 in Canada. Don't Fight It sold more than 100,000 copies in Canada and earned Cochrane and Red Rider their first gold album certification award and was later certified platinum. A United States version with a modified track list, dropping "Talkin' to Myself" and reordering the other tracks, was released in 1980.

The album was re-issued on CD July 29, 1994. The CD release restored the track "Talkin' to Myself" which was dropped on the initial vinyl release in the United States. Another newly remastered version was released in the UK in 2010 by Lemon Records.

The album reached number 146 on Billboard's Pop Albums chart while "White Hot" reached number 20 on the Canadian charts and number 48 on the Pop Singles chart in 1980 and "Don't Fight It" reached number 75.

The song "White Hot" is about poet Arthur Rimbaud and his travels through Africa. It also has a cult following on YouTube.

== Track listing ==
All tracks are written by Tom Cochrane unless otherwise noted; All lead vocals by Cochrane unless otherwise noted.

No.	Title	Writer(s)	Lead vocals	Length
1.	"Don't Fight It"			4:25
2.	"How's My Little Girl Tonight"			4:05
3.	"Iron in the Soul"			3:00
4.	"Make Myself Complete"			3:40
5.	"Good News"	Peter Boynton	Boynton	3:59
6.	"White Hot"	Cochrane, Ken Greer		5:07
7.	"Talkin' to Myself"	Boynton	Boynton	3:39
8.	"Just the Way It Goes"	Cochrane, Greer		3:46
9.	"Look Out Again"	Boynton, Cochrane	Boynton	3:47
10.	"Avenue 'A'"			3:23

== Personnel ==
Personnel taken from Don't Fight It liner notes.

Red Rider

- Tom Cochrane - lead and backing vocals, guitars
- Ken Greer - lead guitars, backing vocals, keyboards
- Peter Boynton - lead and backing vocals, keyboards
- Jeff Jones - bass, backing vocals
- Rob Baker - drums, percussion

Additional musicians

- Bill Payne – synthesizer on "Good News"
- Bobbye Hall – percussion on "Good News" and "Look Out Again"
- Raphael Ravenscroft – soprano saxophone on "White Hot"

Technical personnel

- Michael James Jackson – producer
- Jim Isaacson – engineer
- Toby Scott – engineer
- Gary Gray – engineer
- Ken Friesen – engineer
- Fraser Hill – assistant engineer
- David Taylor – assistant engineer
- Richard McKernan – assistant engineer
- Michael Edward Jackson – assistant engineer
- Carl Wiesen – album art
- J. Zugec – album art
- Denise Grant – photography
- Dave Elliot – art direction

== Charts ==
Chart (1980)	Peak position
Canada Top Albums/CDs (RPM)	20
US Billboard 200	146

== Certifications ==
Region	Certification	Certified units/sales
Canada (Music Canada)	Platinum	100,000^{^}
^{^} Shipments figures based on certification alone.
