= Take It Home (Tom Cochrane album) =

Studio album by Tom Cochrane
- Released: February 10, 2015
- Recorded: at Metalworks Studios in Mississauga, Ontario
- Genre: Rock
- Length: 43:51
- Label: Universal
- Producer: Tom Cochrane

Tom Cochrane chronology
No Stranger (2006)	Take It Home (2015)

Singles from Take It Home
- 1. "Sunday Afternoon Hang" Released: 2015; 2. "Diamonds" Released: 2015

Take It Home is Canadian singer Tom Cochrane's sixth solo studio album and second album for his Universal Music Canada, released on February 10, 2015. Cochrane wrote all of the album with the exception of "Sunday Afternoon Hang" which he co-wrote with Danielle Bourjeaurd.

It was his first album in nine years.

== Track listing ==
All tracks are written by Tom Cochrane unless otherwise noted.

No.	Title	Writer(s)	Length
1.	"Can't Stay Here"		3:40
2.	"Sunday Afternoon Hang"	Cochrane, Danielle Bourjeaurd	3:47
3.	"Diamonds"		3:54
4.	"Country Girls Never Get Old"		4:25
5.	"When The Light Starts To Fade"		3:36
6.	"Pink Time"		5:47
7.	"First Time Around"		3:38
8.	"The Ones I've Known"		4:24
9.	"Another Year"		3:10
10.	"A Prayer For Hope"		4:27
11.	"Back In The Game"		3:11
