= Michael James Jackson =

American record producer (1945–2022)

- Born: June 20, 1945; Chicago, Illinois, U.S.
- Died: July 13, 2022 (aged 77); Los Angeles, California, U.S.
- Occupations: Record producer; composer; engineer

Michael James Jackson (June 20, 1945 – July 13, 2022) was an American record producer, engineer and composer best known for producing albums by Kiss in the 1980s.

== Biography ==
He worked with other bands such as Armored Saint, L.A. Guns, Red Rider, Hurricane, and Pablo Cruise, and collaborated with numerous producers, songwriters and artists including Paul Williams, Jesse Colin Young, Hoyt Axton, Lauren Wood, and Paul Stanley. His production work earned him eight gold and six platinum record awards.

Jackson died from complications of COVID-19 and pneumonia at Cedars-Sinai Medical Center in Los Angeles, on July 13, 2022, during the COVID-19 pandemic in California.
