= 22nd Century (band) =

Canadian rock band

- Origin: Vancouver, British Columbia, Canada
- Genres: Rock; Punk
- Years active: 2007–2018
- Labels: Bugnut Records
- Past members: Bill Chobotar; Duane Nickull; Tim Plommer; Larry Dean Jordan; Rob Lulic; Glen Gaupholm; Kevin Coles; Patrick Jewell

22nd Century was a Canadian rock band from Vancouver, formed in 2007. The band's members included Tim Plommer on guitar and vocals, guitarist Jesus Krysler (Larry Dean Jordan), bassist Duane Nickull (aka Duane Chaos),) drummer Bill Chobotar, aka Zippy Pinhead, guitarist Kevin Coles and drummer Glen Gaupholm. Rob Lulic (of Rymes with Orange fame) briefly played with the band.

== History ==
In the late 1970s, Zippy Pinhead formed Sgt. Nick Penis and the Brassball Battalion with D.O.A. founders Randy Rampage and Chuck Biscuits. Duane met Zippy and Randy while playing bass for Chrissy Steele and they became friends. Zippy moved to San Francisco to play with the band K.G.B. before returning to Vancouver to join D.O.A., then moved between Vancouver and California, playing in bands such as The Dils, Art Bergmann, The Mutants and The Beat Farmers. Duane left the music scene to pursue a career in professional cycling. He returned to music nearly a decade later and joined with Wade Morissette, to play acoustic performances. During this time, Tim Plommer enjoyed success by co-founding a band called Anthill which had the radio single "Child of Ambition".

In 2007, Plommer, Nickull, Coles and Gaulpholm came together as 22nd Century. Duane continued playing part-time for punk-metal band Stress Factor 9; Lulic left before the recording of the first CD. 22nd Century made its first trip to California in late 2008, playing in San Francisco.

In 2009, the band released a six-song EP entitled The Twenty Second Century, produced by John Webster and recorded at Vancouver's Mushroom Studios. By December 2009, the single "509" had hit No. 1 on the Somojo UK Indy charts and stayed in the top 5 for several weeks.

22nd Century also received an honorable mention in Billboard's 2009 global songwriting contest. The band enjoyed early success by licensing their music to Adobe TV (owned by Adobe Systems, Inc.) and had radio airplay in many countries.

In early 2009, Gaupholm left the band and was replaced by Zippy Pinhead. 22nd Century again headed south and headlined in Los Angeles. 38 Special road bass player Scott Fegette joined the group on stage for a version of The Ramones' Blitzkrieg.

In June 2010, John Webster brought the band back to Mushroom Studios to record their next album. In January 2011, 22nd Century released Where's Howie?!! on Bugnut Records. The seventh track on the CD is a cover of Echo Beach written by Mark Gane and originally recorded in 1979 by Martha and the Muffins. Where's Howie?!! also contained a cover of The Angels single No Secrets, written by Doc Neeson and Graham Bidstrup.

22nd Century placed first via popular vote in a nationwide indie contest sponsored by Supernova entitled Band on the Run, and played several venues in Western Canada and New York. During the contest performances, Randy Rampage joined the group on stage for a few songs. The band sold or streamed well over 5,000,000 songs globally from numerous sites.

In 2011, Vancouver's Jesus Krysler joined the band as second guitarist. The band rapidly climbed the ReverbNation charts, reaching No. 1 (locally) and No. 21 (nationally), and appeared on the front cover of Punk Globe magazine. The second video from Where's Howie!?, based on the title track, was launched in August 2011.

Jesus Krysler died of a suspected heart attack in February 2018, at age 57; Zippy, Duane and guitarist Danny Nargang (Kick Axe) played at his funeral service.

Zippy Pinhead, who had been battling heart disease, died of a suspected heart attack in Vancouver on March 13, 2019, at age 57.

Tim Plommer went into the financial/investment world. Gaupholm became a web analyst. Coles continues as a musician. Duane Nickull went into the software industry and then into politics, running as a candidate for the Green Party of British Columbia.

== Discography ==
- 2009: The Twenty Second Century (EP)
- 2010: Radio Hits 3 (Eastern European Compilation)
- 2011: Where's Howie?!!
- 2011: Riot on the Sunset (Compilation)
