= Neil Harnett =

Canadian blues rock singer

Neil Harnett, sometimes credited in his early career as Neil James Harnett, is a Canadian blues rock singer-songwriter from White Rock, British Columbia, most noted as a Juno Award nominee for Most Promising Male Vocalist at the Juno Awards of 1990.

He began his career as a guitarist in Matt Minglewood's band. He was also a songwriter for other artists in this era, but was not a recording artist in his own right; his career received a significant boost in 1988 when his song "Ain't Good Lovin' Enough" was recorded by both the pop-rock band Diamond in the Rough and the country band Alibi. He was soon signed to Bruce Allen's Penta Records label, and released his debut album Times Like These in 1989. He supported the album with a Canadian tour as an opening act for The Doobie Brothers, and received radio airplay for the singles "Times Like These" and "That's What I Need".

By early 1991, however, Penta Records filed for bankruptcy, leaving Harnett's career in limbo for several years.

In 1992 his song "Lazy River" was included on Canadian Blues Masters, a K-Tel compilation of Canadian blues musicians.

He reemerged in 1996 with his second album Rubber Room Day. He then spent a number of years largely away from music, until returning to live performances in the latter half of the 2000s. He was working on his third album, Somewhere, in 2008 when his daughter Amy suffered a traumatic brain injury in a workplace accident; the album's recording and release were delayed for several months, but the album was eventually released in 2009.

In 2013 he launched a YouTube channel devoted to brain injury awareness, with one of the first videos he posted to the channel being a duet with his daughter on a song they wrote together about her recovery. In the same year he organized a benefit concert for Semiahmoo House Society, a charitable organization serving people with disabilities in White Rock and Surrey.
