= Hang On to Your Resistance =

Studio album by Tom Cochrane
- Released: 1974
- Recorded: 1974 in Toronto, Ontario
- Genre: Rock
- Length: 35:32
- Label: Daffodil
- Producer: Tom Cochrane

Tom Cochrane chronology
Hang On to Your Resistance (1974)	Mad Mad World (1991)

Second edition cover
- Cover released by Capitol Records

Hang On to Your Resistance is the debut album by Canadian musician Tom Cochrane, originally released in 1974 on Daffodil Records. The album was released under just his last name, Cochrane. In 1987, Capitol Records re-released the album under Tom Cochrane but changed the title slightly to Hang On to Your Resistance (The Early Years).

== Track listing ==
All tracks are written by Tom Cochrane.

No.	Title	Length
1.	"Hang On to Your Resistance"	3:35
2.	"West Coast Saga"	4:05
3.	"Charlie Was a Dancer"	3:03
4.	"Didn't I Lorraine"	4:23
5.	"You're Driving Me Crazy (Faith Healers)"	2:37
6.	"I Wish That I (Could See You Now)"	4:49
7.	"Revelations: Visions in a Dream"	3:27
8.	"What's in You?"	3:43
9.	"When I'm with You"	2:31
10.	"Another Page"	3:19

== Personnel ==
Personnel taken from Hang On to Your Resistance liner notes.

- Tom Cochrane – vocals, acoustic and electric guitars, keyboards
- Rick Nickerson – bass, additional percussion
- Deane Cameron – percussion

Additional musicians

- Allan Booth – piano (on all tracks except "When I'm With You")
- Dave Cooper – electric, steel, and six-string guitars on "What's In You?"
- Man Guenther – strings on "You're Driving Me Crazy (Faith Healers)"
- Danny – oboe on "Didn't I Lorraine"
- Dave Budgell – backing vocals on "When I'm With You"
- Peter Rochon – additional keyboard effects

Technical personnel

- Tom Cochrane – production, mixing, album concept
- Paul Barker – co-production, mixing, engineering
- Francis W.H. Davies – co-production, mixing
- Bob Ludwig – mastering
- Patrick McFarlane – album concept, front cover & album layout

== Charts ==
Chart (1975)	Peak position
Canada Top Albums/CDs (RPM)	80
