= Big League (song) =

Single by Tom Cochrane & Red Rider

from the album Victory Day
- Released: September 1988
- Genre: Pop rock, Arena Rock
- Length: 4:36
- Label: Capitol
- Songwriter: Tom Cochrane
- Producer: Don Gehman

Tom Cochrane & Red Rider singles chronology
"Ocean Blues (Emotion Blue)" (1987)	"Big League" (1988)	"Calling America" (1989)

Audio
- "Big League" on YouTube

"Big League" is a song by Tom Cochrane released as the first track from the Canadian rock band Tom Cochrane & Red Rider's 1988 album Victory Day. One of the band's most successful and popular singles, the song was a charting hit in both Canada and the United States, peaking at number 4 in the Canadian RPM Hot 100 and number 9 in the American Billboard Rock Tracks chart.

In 2018, Cochrane released a new solo recording of the song as a charity single to benefit the victims and survivors of the Humboldt Broncos bus crash.

== Background ==
The song is told from the "voice of an anguished hockey parent from an unidentified northern town", whose son had earned a scholarship with a U.S. team before being killed when a truck travelling in the wrong lane crashed into his car.

While the song is fictional, Cochrane has said it was inspired by a custodian who approached him before a show at a rink and requested Cochrane play his son's favourite song, "Boy Inside the Man" from the band's 1986 self-titled album. He noticed the man was using the past tense, and as the conversation continued, Cochrane understood that the father's son had died.

The story resonated with Cochrane, who said he began to write a song that crafted a stronger hockey narrative and thematic elements of mortality around the basis of his encounter with the father. The singer spent less than half an hour forming the basic structure, which he wrote with only a tape recorder, a guitar and a notepad in a rented bungalow in Mississauga, Ontario.

== Reception ==
"Big League" was well received upon release, with the Ottawa Citizen praising Cochrane's song, calling him "hockey's man of the moment". It has become one of the band's signature songs, and still gets frequent airplay on classic rock radio stations around the world.

The song was also featured in the fifth-season episode of Miami Vice "Hard Knocks", which was first broadcast in early 1989.

=== Accolades ===
"Big League" was nominated for the Juno Award for Single of the Year in 1989, and won the SOCAN Award for Best Rock Song. British Columbia radio station CKKQ-FM "the Q" compiled a list of the 150 Best Canadian Songs of All Time, in honour of Canada Day in 2017, where "Big League" was ranked at #11. In 2006, CBC released a list of the "Top 10 Hockey Songs", where "Big League" ranked #3, behind only "Fifty Mission Cap" by The Tragically Hip and "The Hockey Song" by Tom Connors.

== Legacy ==
"Big League" has been used in a number of forms to honour young Canadian hockey players whose lives were cut short.

The song has become an enduring part of hockey lore in Canada, particularly for junior hockey teams, whose communities helped build legends and rumours around its origins. Some suggested it was based on the life of George Pelawa, an 18-year-old high school hockey right winger from Bemidji, Minnesota. He was killed in a car accident months after he was selected 16th overall for the Calgary Flames in 1986.

Another theory suggested the song was drawn from a separate 1986 accident involving a bus carrying the Swift Current Broncos, which skidded off the road after hitting a patch of black ice. Four players were killed in the crash, including Brent Ruff, the younger brother of Buffalo Sabres captain Lindy Ruff.

Pat Quinn played the song in the Vancouver Canucks dressing room when he was coach, according to Cochrane. The Canucks also used the song in a campaign video for player Trevor Linden's candidacy for the Calder Trophy as NHL rookie of the year.

Samir Kadri, the father of Calgary Flames centre Nazem Kadri, has said the song came on the radio as he was driving to the delivery ward, which he considered an omen for his son's future career.

"Big League" has also commonly been used in tributes to fallen hockey players. It was played at a December 1988 arena memorial service for three players and the coach of a junior hockey team in Alberta who were killed when their car collided with a train near Calgary. It was also the team's theme song.

Cochrane performed an acoustic version of Big League during a televised memorial tribute to Luc Bourdon, the Canucks defenceman who was killed in a motorcycle accident in May 2008. Bourdon's family had requested he perform the song before the opening face-off of the Canucks' first home game.

Canadian singer-songwriter Del Barber recorded a cover of the song for his 2016 hockey themed album The Puck Drops Here.

In 2018, "Big League" reappeared again as Canadians mourned the deaths of 16 people in the Humboldt Broncos bus crash in Saskatchewan. A semi-trailer collided with a bus carrying the youth hockey team, injuring 13 others.

One YouTuber asked Cochrane for permission to use the song in a tribute video to the players.

Four days after the Humboldt Broncos crash, Cochrane appeared on Canadian sports network TSN to perform an acoustic version of the song before hockey coverage began. He updated the lyrics to imply the players were "riding to immortality" and placed an emphasis on the unpredictability of life. Eight days later, he released a studio recording of the reworked version as a charity single, with sales proceeds directed to the Humboldt Strong Community Foundation.
