= Stonebolt =

Canadian rock band

Stonebolt was a Canadian rock band from Vancouver. Their sound also included elements of pop and country.

== History ==
The band first formed in 1969 under the name Perth Amboy. After adding a vocalist and keyboard player, they changed their name to Stonebolt in 1973. They performed in local Vancouver area venues for the next four years, and in 1976 they recorded five demos with producer Elliot Mazer at his San Francisco studio. In 1977, they signed a production contract with W. Stewart Productions, who in turn landed a recording contract with Parachute Records. The band released a self-titled album in 1978. A song from this album, "I Will Still Love You", became their first and highest-charting hit single (US #29, and #20 Easy Listening). It did better in Canada, getting to #19 on singles charts after a slow, 17 week climb. A second single, "Love Struck" (U.S. #70), was released in 1979 and appeared on their second album. After Parachute went under, they signed with RCA Records, but further success eluded them. They broke up in 1983, but reformed in 1997 with four of the five original recording members. The guys now perform together several times a year at classic rock events. In 1999, Stonebolt re-recorded many of their songs for the CD compilation Regeneration: The Best of Stonebolt, as no original master tapes could be found.

== Members ==
- David Wills – lead and backing vocals
- Ray Roper – guitar, backing and lead vocals
- John Webster – keyboards
- Dan Atchison – bass
- Brian Lousley – drums, backing vocals
- Lewis Nitikman – keyboards (replaced John Webster in 1981)

== Album discography ==
- Stonebolt (Parachute Records, 1978)
- Keep It Alive (RCA Records, 1979)
- New Set of Changes (RCA Records, 1980)
- Juvenile American Princess (RCA Records, 1982)
- Regeneration: The Best of Stonebolt (Vortex Music, 1999)
