= Tom Cochrane =

Canadian musician (born 1953)

Tom Cochrane OC OM
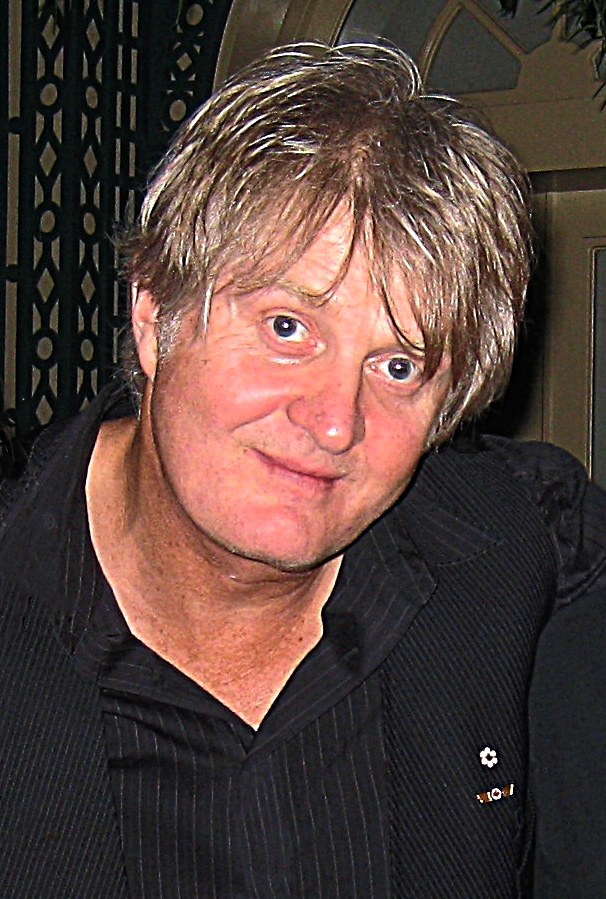
- Cochrane in 2008

Background information
- Born: Thomas William Cochrane; May 14, 1953 (age 73); Lynn Lake, Manitoba, Canada
- Origin: Toronto, Ontario, Canada
- Genres: Rock; heartland rock
- Occupations: Musician; singer; songwriter
- Instruments: Vocals; guitar; harmonica
- Years active: 1973–present
- Labels: Capitol; Universal Music
- Member of: Red Rider
- Website: www.tomcochrane.com

Thomas William Cochrane OC OM (/ˈkɒkrən/ KOK-rən; born May 14, 1953) is a Canadian musician best known as the frontman of rock band Red Rider and for his work as a solo singer-songwriter. Cochrane has won eight Juno Awards. He is a member of the Canadian Music Hall of Fame, an officer of the Order of Canada, and has an honorary doctorate from Brandon University. In September 2009, he was inducted onto Canada's Walk of Fame.

== Life and career ==
=== Early life ===
Cochrane was born in the mining town of Lynn Lake, Manitoba. His father was a bush pilot. When he was four years old, he and his family moved to Acton, Ontario and then to Oakville.

=== Red Rider ===
After meeting at the El Mocambo tavern in Toronto, Cochrane joined the Canadian rock band Red Rider in 1978 and served as their lead singer and main songwriter for more than ten years. Red Rider included Ken Greer, Jeff Jones, Peter Boynton, Rob Baker, Arvo Lepp, Steve Sexton, Bjorn Anderson, Ken Spider Sinnaeve, Kier Brownstone, Randall Correall, and Bill Bell. Bruce Allen managed the band from their debut until 1985. Cochrane recorded six studio albums with Red Rider plus a live album, a best-of album, and a box set. By 1986, the band was billed as "Tom Cochrane & Red Rider". He would later refer to this period of his career as a stretch of "manageable success" before the release of Mad Mad World.

In 2002, Cochrane reunited with his former Red Rider bandmates Greer and Jones and continues to perform with them.

=== Solo career ===
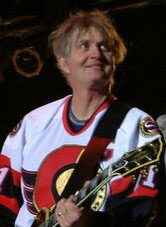
Cochrane performing in 2003

Already a household name in Canada from his time with Red Rider, Cochrane launched his solo career in 1991 with the release of the song "Life Is a Highway". The single became a global success and was followed by the release of his album Mad Mad World, which would reach the six million mark in worldwide sales. The albums Ragged Ass Road, Songs of a Circling Spirit, Xray Sierra, and No Stranger followed. Cochrane's current band consists of Bill Bell, Jeff Jones, and Davide Direnzo.

=== Present ===
An avid golfer, pilot, and hockey buff, Cochrane lives in British Columbia, and spends summers at his cottage/studio on the shores of Georgian Bay in Northern Ontario. Cochrane has two daughters.

Cochrane continues to tour and perform in Canada. In 2006, the group Rascal Flatts charted in the top 10 of the Hot 100 with a cover of "Life Is a Highway", which they recorded for the Pixar film Cars. Although the song was not originally released to country radio, several country stations began playing the song, causing it to chart within the top 20 of Hot Country Songs. Chris LeDoux also had a country hit with "Life Is a Highway".

In October 2016, Cochrane celebrated the twenty-fifth anniversary of his album Mad Mad World with an announcement of the release of a special edition of the album, featuring a demo recording of "Love is a Highway", the working title of "Life Is a Highway", as well as a second disc featuring a live performance from a 1992 Chicago stop on the tour supporting the album.

In 2016, the Manitoba provincial government renamed a section of a highway near his hometown of Lynn Lake after the hit "Life Is a Highway". A stretch of Highway 391 was renamed Tom Cochrane's Life is a Highway.

== Honours ==
Canadian Songwriters Hall of Fame: Cochrane was inducted into the Canadian Songwriters Hall of Fame in 2024 for his achievements as a songwriter and his contributions to Canada and around the world.

Canadian Music Hall of Fame induction: Cochrane was inducted into the Canadian Music Hall of Fame in 2003 for outstanding contribution to the greater recognition of Canadian music. The ceremony took place April 5, 2003, at Casino du Lac-Leamy in Gatineau, Quebec. The following night, Cochrane was honoured for his induction in a speech by Jeff Healey at the Juno Awards at the Corel Centre (now Canadian Tire Centre in Ottawa). Cochrane closed the show by performing a medley of his hits and was joined onstage by host Shania Twain for the final song, "Life Is a Highway".

Order of Canada: In April 2008, Cochrane received one of the highest honours for a Canadian citizen when he was invested as an officer of the Order of Canada (the level companion of the Order of Canada is the highest honour, and several people originally invested as officers have been promoted to companions for continued contributions to charity and the arts, among other fields). Cochrane was honoured for a lifetime of charity work, his contribution to the arts and for being unabashedly Canadian.

Canada's Walk of Fame: In September 2009, Cochrane was inducted onto Canada's Walk of Fame. The induction was highlighted by a two-hour nationally televised gala at Toronto's Four Season's Center for the Performing Arts. Anne Murray hosted the event which also included the inductions of Kim Cattrall, Raymond Burr, Blue Rodeo, Dsquared2, Howie Mandel, Robert Munsch and Chantal Petitclerc.

Honorary colonel: In November 2007, Cochrane was formally invested as an honorary colonel (HCol) by the Royal Canadian Air Force's 409 "Nighthawks" Tactical Fighter Squadron. As part of his investiture weekend, Cochrane experienced his second flight in a CF-18.

Honorary doctorate: In May 2005, Cochrane received an honorary doctorate from Brandon University in Brandon, Manitoba. In addition, musician James Ehnes, journalist Henry Champ and actress Shirley Douglas received honorary doctorates from the university at the spring convocation held May 28, 2005.

Canadian Music Industry Hall of Fame: Cochrane was inducted on May 9, 2014, Gil Moore formerly of the band Triumph made the presentation.

Canadian Music Industry Humanitarian Award: In March 2005, Cochrane received the Humanitarian Award at the Canadian Music Industry Association's (CMIA) gala dinner in Toronto during the annual Canadian Music Week Festival.

Allan Waters Humanitarian Award: In April 2013, Cochrane received the award at the 2013 Juno Awards gala dinner.

Henry H. Knowles Humanitarian Award: In May 2014, Cochrane received this award from OPSEU.

Order of Manitoba: In July 2015, Cochrane received the Order Of Manitoba.

On October 31, 2016, the provincial legislature of Manitoba announced a 322-kilometre section of Provincial Road 391 connecting Lynn Lake and Thompson would be designated Tom Cochrane's Life Is a Highway.

In 2024, Cochrane was inducted into the Canadian Songwriters Hall of Fame.

== Discography ==
=== Albums ===
==== Solo ====
- 1974: Hang On to Your Resistance
- 1975: My Pleasure Is My Business (soundtrack)
- 1991: Mad Mad World
- 1995: Ragged Ass Road
- 1999: Xray Sierra
- 2006: No Stranger
- 2015: Take It Home
- 2016: Mad Mad World (Deluxe Edition with live disc)

==== Compilation albums (solo) ====
- 1997: Songs of a Circling Spirit

==== With Red Rider ====
- 1979: Don't Fight It
- 1981: As Far as Siam
- 1983: Neruda
- 1984: Breaking Curfew
- 1986: Tom Cochrane and Red Rider (as Tom Cochrane & Red Rider)
- 1988: Victory Day (as Tom Cochrane & Red Rider)
- 1989: The Symphony Sessions (as Tom Cochrane & Red Rider)

==== Compilation albums (with Red Rider) ====
- 1987: Over 60 Minutes with Red Rider
- 1993: Ashes to Diamonds (3-CD boxed set)
- 2002: Anthology 1980–1987
- 2002: Trapeze: The Collection

=== Singles ===
==== Solo ====
Year	Title	Chart peak				Album
Year	Title	CAN	US	US Rock	AUS	Album
1973	"You're Driving Me Crazy (Faith Healers)"	71	—	—	—	Hang on to Your Resistance
1974	"Hang On to Your Resistance"	—	—	—	—	Hang on to Your Resistance
1974	"I Wish I Could See You Now"	—	—	—	—	Hang on to Your Resistance
1975	"Gabriella"	—	—	—	—	My Pleasure Is My Business soundtrack
1975	"Softly Walk Away"	—	—	—	—	Non-album singles
1976	"Sail On"	—	—	—	—	Non-album singles
1989	"Big League"	—	—	—	155	Non-album single
1991	"Life Is a Highway"	1	6	6	2	Mad Mad World
1991	"No Regrets"	3	—	7	26	Mad Mad World
1992	"Sinking Like a Sunset"	2	—	—	—	Mad Mad World
1992	"Mad Mad World"	25	—	—	—	Mad Mad World
1992	"Washed Away"	7	88	—	129	Mad Mad World
1992	"Bigger Man"	45	—	—	—	Mad Mad World
1995	"I Wish You Well"	1	— (Note: "I Wish You Well" did not enter the Hot 100, but peaked at number 1 on Bubbling Under Hot 100 Singles, which acts as an extension of the Hot 100.)	—	138	Ragged Ass Road
1995	"Wildest Dreams"	5	—	—	199	Ragged Ass Road
1996	"Dreamer's Dream"	4	—	—	—	Ragged Ass Road
1996	"Crawl"	11	—	—	—	Ragged Ass Road
1997	"Lunatic Fringe"	70	—	—	—	Songs of a Circling Spirit
1997	"Good Man Feeling Bad"	46	—	—	—	Songs of a Circling Spirit
1999	"I Wonder"	86	—	—	—	X-Ray Sierra
1999	"Willie Dixon Said"	30	—	—	—	X-Ray Sierra
1999	"Stonecutter's Arms"	—	—	—	—	X-Ray Sierra
1999	"Heartbreak Girl"	—	—	—	—	X-Ray Sierra
2005	"Christmas All the Time"	—	—	—	—	Non-album single
2006	"Didn't Mean"	—	—	—	—	No Stranger
2006	"The Party's Not Over"	—	—	—	—	No Stranger
2007	"Out of My Head"	—	—	—	—	No Stranger
2007	"Northern Star"	—	—	—	—	No Stranger
2014	"Sunday Afternoon Hang"	—	—	—	—	Take It Home
2014	"Diamonds"	—	—	—	—	Take It Home
2018	"Big League"	—	—	—	—	Non-album charity single
"—" denotes a single that didn't chart

==== With Red Rider ====
Year	Title	Chart peak			Album
Year	Title	CAN	US	US Rock	Album
1979	"White Hot"	20	48	—	Don't Fight It
1980	"Don't Fight It"	75	— (Note: "Don't Fight It" did not enter the Hot 100, but peaked at number 3 on Bubbling Under the Hot 100, which acts as an extension of the Hot 100.)	—	Don't Fight It
1981	"What Have You Got to Do"	42	—	—	As Far as Siam
1981	"Lunatic Fringe"	—	—	11	As Far as Siam
1983	"Human Race"	29	—	11	Neruda
1983	"Power (Strength in Numbers)"	—	—	13	Neruda
1983	"Crack the Sky (Breakaway)"	—	—	39	Neruda
1984	"Young Thing, Wild Dreams (Rock Me)"	44	71	13	Breaking Curfew
1984	"Breaking Curfew"	93	—	—	Breaking Curfew
1986	"Boy Inside the Man"	25	—	17	Tom Cochrane and Red Rider
1986	"The Untouchable One"	70	—	48	Tom Cochrane and Red Rider
1987	"One More Time (Some Old Habits)"	85	—	—	Tom Cochrane and Red Rider
1987	"Ocean Blues (Emotion Blue)"	88	—	—	Tom Cochrane and Red Rider
1988	"Big League"	4	—	9	Victory Day
1989	"Good Times"	2	—	—	Victory Day
1989	"Victory Day"	32	—	—	Victory Day
1989	"Different Drummer"	67	—	—	Victory Day
1989	"White Hot" (Live)	50	—	—	The Symphony Sessions
1990	"Bird on a Wire" (Live)	88	—	—	The Symphony Sessions
2002	"Just Like Ali"	39	—	—	Trapeze: The Collection
2002	"Pictures from the Edge"	—	—	—	Trapeze: The Collection
"—" denotes a single that didn't chart

== See also ==
- Music of Canada
- Canadian rock
- Canadian Music Hall of Fame
- Canadian Songwriters Hall of Fame
- List of diamond-certified albums in Canada
