= Steve Sexton =

- Born: Stephen Michael Sexton; Richmond Hill, Ontario, Canada
- Genres: Film music
- Occupation: Film composer
- Instrument: Keyboards
- Years active: 1982–present
- Label: Mesa Bluemoon Records (Los Angeles)
- Website: Stevesexton.com

Steve Sexton is a Canadian composer, arranger, musical director, producer and keyboardist. He served as Canadian singer Anne Murray's Musical Director for 25 years with responsibilities as her pianist, conductor, arranger, and on occasion her producer.

== Early career ==
Sexton was born in Richmond Hill, Ontario, Canada. He graduated from Richmond Hill High School and received a music degree from The University of Western Ontario and a performance degree from the Western Ontario Conservatory of Music. He was a member of the Canadian rock band, Red Rider, from 1982 to 1984 and appears as keyboardist on their albums Breaking Curfew and Neruda. He was one half (with Gerald O'Brien) of the jazz/new-age ensemble, Exchange, whose recordings include Between Places, Into the Night, Exchange, and Beyond Words. Between Places reached number 9 in the Billboard New Age chart for June 30, 1990. He also appears as keyboardist on the Strange Advance album, 2WO, Platinum Blonde's album, Standing in the Dark, Shirley Eikhard's comeback album, Taking Charge, and the Jim Carrey film, Copper Mountain. His ensemble, Exchange, was nominated for a 1993 Juno Award for Best Instrumental Artist or Ensemble of the year and they have released seven albums.

== Work with Anne Murray ==
Steve's extensive career has had him working alongside such artists as Celine Dion, Bryan Adams, Michael Bublé, Anne Murray, and top orchestras such as the London Symphony Orchestra and the Boston Pops Philharmonic orchestra and worked with John Williams.

He served as Anne Murray's Musical Director for 25 years with responsibilities as her pianist, conductor, arranger, and on occasion her producer. He was the Music Director for many of her television shows, including Friends & Legends (2008), The Music of My Life (2005), Intimate Evening with Anne Murray (1998), The Sounds of London (1985), Anne Murray's Winter Carnival in Quebec (1984), and A Special Anne Murray Christmas (1981). He also produced Anne Murray's Christmas Album (2008), An Intimate Evening With Anne Murray (1998), Anne Murray's Classic Christmas (1995), and Anne Murray (1991).

== Notable television and film scores ==
His music scores for television shows include The Legend of Prince Valiant, and The Phantom 2040. As a songwriter, his compositions include "Her Body Makes Vows" which appears on the soundtrack for the Antonio Banderas and Rebecca DeMornay film Never Talk to Strangers and Tú's single "Stay With Me", the band's biggest hit. According to his official website, his compositions have also been heard on several sporting events and broadcasts including the Olympics, the Super Bowl, the Tour de France, the Masters Tournament, Baseball World Series, ABC's Wide World of Sports and the Ryder Cup.

== See also ==
- Gerald O'Brien
