= John Webster (musician) =

Canadian musician

- Born: 18 December 1957 (age 68); Canada
- Genres: Rock
- Occupations: Musician, engineer, composer
- Instrument: Keyboards
- Years active: 1978−present
- Formerly of: Stonebolt; Red Rider

John Webster (born 18 December 1957) is a musician, engineer and producer who primarily plays keyboards. He began his musical career as a child, trained in classical piano until his early teens, and then moved on to playing in rock bands. One of his first bands, Stonebolt, landed a top 30 U.S. hit with its first release in 1978 and went on to record four successful albums.

Webster joined the band Red Rider in 1984, performing on that year's Breaking Curfew album and remaining with the group until they disbanded in 1990. Webster then continued to work closely in productions with its leader, Tom Cochrane, including his highly successful Mad Mad World album.

Through the 1980s and 1990s, Webster worked on many major recordings done in Vancouver's Little Mountain Sound Studios with producers Bruce Fairbairn and Bob Rock.

Webster has appeared on many albums by established artists all over the musical spectrum. His production achievements include two Juno awards, many nominations, and numerous multi-platinum Canadian releases in both languages. He also composes music for films, including Rapid Fire (2005) and Absolute Zero. He performed live with R.S.O (Richie Sambora/Orienthi) in 2016 with dates in Europe, Asia, and South America.

Webster's partner is songwriter/artist Annette Ducharme.

== Discography ==
- 22nd Century (band) — The Twenty Second Century — keyboards, producer, engineer, mix
- 22nd Century (band) — Where's Howie — producer, engineer, mix
- Lee Aaron — Fire and Gasoline — keyboards, engineer, mix
- Lee Aaron — Diamond Baby Blues — keyboards, producer, engineer, mix
- Lee Aaron — Radio on — engineer
- Lee Aaron — Elevate — engineer
- AC/DC — The Razors Edge — programming
- Aerosmith — Get a Grip — keyboards, programming
- Aerosmith — Nine Lives — keyboards
- Aerosmith — Pump — keyboards
- After All — How High the Moon — producer, keyboards
- Annihilator — Set the World on Fire — keyboards
- Jann Arden — Covers 2, Spotlight, Christmas — keyboards
- Bif Naked — Five Songs and a Poem — keyboards
- Bif Naked —i bificus — producer, keyboards
- Bif Naked — Superbeautifulmonster — keyboards, mix
- Jordie Birch — Beatrice — mix
- Jaydee Bixby — Cowboys and Cadillacs — producer, engineer, mix, keyboards
- Jaydee Bixby — Easy to Love — producer, engineer, mix, keyboards
- Blue Murder — Blue Murder — keyboards, keyboard programming
- Bon Jovi — Slippery When Wet — programming
- Bon Jovi — New Jersey — programming
- Boom Desjardins — Avec le Temps — producer, engineer, mix, keyboards
- Boom Desjardins — Boom Desjardins — producer, engineer, mix, keyboards
- Boom Desjardins — Rock le Quebec — producer, engineer, mix, keyboards
- Black Veiled Brides - Black Veiled Brides IV — keyboards
- Michael Bublé — Christmas — Hammond B3 organ
- Michael Bublé and Van Morrison — Real, Real Gone — keyboards
- Captain Tractor — Celebrity Traffic Jam — producer, engineer, mix, keyboards
- Cher — Love Hurts — keyboards
- Cinderella — Long Cold Winter — keyboards
- The Clumsy Lovers — After the Flood — producer, engineer, mix, keyboards
- The Clumsy Lovers — Smart Kid — producer, engineer, mix, keyboards
- Tom Cochrane — Mad Mad World — arranger, keyboards
- Tom Cochrane — Ragged Ass Road — keyboards, producer, engineer
- Tom Cochrane — Songs of a Circling Spirit — mix
- Tom Cochrane — Trapeze — engineer, mix
- Tom Cochrane — X-Ray Sierra — producer, engineer, mix, keyboards
- Tom Cochrane & Red Rider — The Symphony Sessions — keyboards
- Tom Cochrane & Red Rider — Tom Cochrane & Red Rider — keyboards
- Tom Cochrane & Red Rider — Victory Day — bass, keyboards, producer
- Alice Cooper — Hey Stoopid — keyboards
- Travis Cormier — Dollars and Hearts — keyboards
- The Cult — Sonic Temple — keyboards
- Alan Doyle — A Week at the Warehouse — keyboards
- Dan Reed Network - Dan Reed Network - keyboards, programming
- Annette Ducharme — Bloom — producer, engineer, mixing, keyboards
- Annette Ducharme — Blue Girl — producer, engineer, mixing, keyboards
- Annette Ducharme — Sanctuary — producer, engineer, mixing, keyboards
- Annette Ducharme — Talented Girl — producer, engineer, mixing, keyboards
- Annette Ducharme — Tortured — producer, engineer, mixing, keyboards
- Electric Boys — Funk-O-Metal Carpet Ride — keyboards
- Johnny Ferreira — Sax on the Beach — producer, engineer, mix, keyboards
- Nina Gordon — Tonight and the Rest of My Life... — keyboards
- Gowan — Lost Brotherhood — keyboards
- Grapes of Wrath — Treehouse — keyboards
- Oliver Haze — Wandering Trip — producer, engineer, mix, keyboards
- The Heck — The Heck — producer, engineer, mix, keyboards
- Idle Eyes — Idle Eyes — keyboards
- The Immigrants — The Immigrants — producer, engineer, mix, keyboards
- Colin James — Take It from the Top — keyboards
- Jet Set Satellite — Blueprint — producer, engineer, mix, keyboards
- Jonas — Jonas — producer, engineer, mix, keyboards
- Jonas — Promised Land — producer, engineer, mix, keyboards
- Jonas — Suite Life — producer, engineer, mix, keyboards
- Kingdom Come — Kingdom Come — keyboards
- Paul Laine — Stick it in your Ear — keyboards
- Eric Lapointe — Invite Les Vatours — arranger, keyboards, programming
- Eric Lapointe — A l'Ombre de L'Ange — arranger, keyboards, programming
- Limblifter — Bellaclava — keyboards
- Little Caesar — Little Caesar — keyboards
- London Quireboys — London Quireboys — keyboards
- Sean MacDonald — Butterflies — mix
- Raymond May — Unadulterated Addiction — keyboards
- Kim Mitchell — Aural Fixations — keyboards, producer
- The Moffats — Submodalities — keyboards
- Stefane Moraille (Bran Van 3000) — producer, engineer, mix, keyboards
- Mötley Crüe — Decade of Decadence — keyboards
- Mötley Crüe — Dr. Feelgood — keyboards, programming
- Nazanin — Nazanin — producer, engineer, mix, keyboards
- Never the Bride — Never the Bride — keyboards
- Paperboys — Molinos — keyboards, producer, engineer, mix
- The Paperboys — Postcards — producer, engineer, mix, keyboards
- Kevin Parent — Fangless Wolf Faces Winter — keyboards
- Kevin Parent — Le Grand Parleur — producer, engineer, mix, keyboards
- Kevin Parent — Les Vents ont Changé — producer, engineer, mix, keyboards
- A Perfect Day — All Over Everything — producer, engineer, mix, keyboards
- A Perfect Day — A Perfect Day — producer, engineer, mix, keyboards
- Poison — Flesh and Blood — keyboards
- Marshall Potts — The Storm — producer, engineer, mix, keyboards
- Pure — Generation Six-pack — mix
- Pure — Pure — producer, engineer
- Rampage — Randy's Final Rampage — producer (2019-08-01) unreleased final album of the late Randy Rampage
- Red Rider — Breaking Curfew — keyboards
- Jodi Rescher — producer, engineer, mix, keyboards
- Rock and Hyde — Under the Volcano — keyboards, programming
- Rockhead — Rockhead — keyboards
- Mick Ronson — Heaven and Hull — keyboards
- David Lee Roth — A Little Ain't Enough – keyboards
- Rush — Counterparts — keyboards
- Rymes with Orange — One More Mile — mix
- Rymes with Orange — Trapped in the Machine — producer, engineer, mix, keyboards
- Salvador Dream — Salvador Dream — producer, engineer, mix, keyboards
- Scorpions — Face the Heat — keyboards
- Ron Sexsmith — Late Bloomer — keyboards
- R.S.O (Richie Sambora/Orianthi) — Radio Free America — keyboards
- Soma City Ward — mix
- SoulDecision — single — remix
- Soundtrack — A Guy Thing (Julia Stiles/Jason Lee film) — engineer, mix
- Soundtrack — Urban Legend — producer, engineer, mix, keyboards
- Sharp Edges — Slice of Life — keyboards
- Special Guests — the first Album — producer, engineer, mix, keyboards
- Stonebolt — Keep It Alive — keyboards
- Stonebolt — New Set of Changes — keyboards
- Stonebolt — Stonebolt — keyboards
- Suicidal Tendencies — The Art of Rebellion — keyboards
- The Suits XL — mix
- Tailor-made Fable — mix, keyboards
- Templar — Under The Sun — producer, engineer, mix, keyboards
- Tragically Hip — We Are the Same — keyboards
- Van Halen — Balance — keyboards
- The Vincent Black Shadow — Fear Is in the Water — engineer, mix, keyboards
- Warrant — Cherry Pie — keyboards
- West End Girls — West End Girls — arranger, keyboards
- West End Girls — We Belong Together — arranger, keyboards
- Winston — Passengers — producer, engineer, mix, keyboards

== Film and television credits ==
- Absolute Zero (movie score composer/performer)
- Anywhere but Here (20th Century Fox)
- The Anna Nicole Show
- Pop Star Puppy (movie score composer/performer)
- Edgemount (CBC series title track)
- Fashion TV (numerous)
- A Guy Thing (Jason Lee/Julia Stiles movie)
- Rapid Fire (Movie score composer/performer)
- Sweetwater (HBO)
- Urban Legend (Tri-Star)

== Awards ==
- Juno Award Best Group 1986 — for Red Rider
- Juno Award Roots Traditional 1998 — for The Paperboys
- Juno Award Best Francophone Album 2002 — for Kevin Parent
- Felix Award Engineer of the Year 2002 — for Kevin Parent
- Socan No. 1 Award 2005 — Pour Te Voir
