= Annette Ducharme =

Canadian musician and songwriter

- Born: Annette Marie Jeanne Ducharme; February 23; Windsor, Ontario, Canada
- Occupations: Singer-songwriter; actor
- Years active: 1981–present
- Musical career
- Genres: Alternative rock; pop rock
- Instruments: Vocals; guitar
- Labels: Capitol; Beggars Bliss; Fuel; Dream Control Music
- Website: anetmusic.com

Annette Marie Jeanne Ducharme (born February 23), known professionally as Anet, is a Canadian singer-songwriter. She is particularly known for her songwriting contributions for Canadian musicians Tom Cochrane and Lawrence Gowan. She has received several awards including two SOCAN Awards and nominations for a Juno Award and a MuchMusic Video Award.

Ducharme began her career as a member of the new wave duo Bowers-Ducharme, who released a self-titled extended play in 1981. She stepped back from the music industry for several years before signing to Capitol Records in the late 1980s. She received recognition with the release of her debut studio album, Blue Girl (1989), which experienced commercial success in Canada. Its lead single "No Such Thing" was moderately successful on the RPM Top Singles chart and received a MuchMusic Video Award nomination. Ducharme departed from Capitol Records after Blue Girl's release and she has since independently released five studio albums: Sanctuary (1994), Bloom (1995), Tortured (1997), Talented Girl (2002), and Wreck•Age (2019).

== History ==
=== 1981-1992: Career beginnings and Bowers-Ducharme ===
In 1981, Bowers-Ducahrme released an extended play, Schitzy Robot, through Capitol Records.

=== 1989-1992: Breakthrough with Blue Girl ===
In 1989, Ducharme released her debut studio album, Blue Girl. Its lead single "No Such Thing" peaked at number 51 on the RPM Singles Chart for the week of June 12, 1989.

=== 1993–1996: Don't Argue with Her ===
In 1993, Ducharme formed her own record label, Bliss Records. In 1996, she released "Change Your Mind" as the lead single from Don't Argue with Her (known internationally as Bloom).

=== 1997–2002: Tortured and Talented Girl ===
On July 2, 2002, Ducharme released her fifth studio album, Talented Girl, under Sextant Records. The song "Nicotine" was featured on the soundtrack to the 2003 drama film Thirteen.

== Discography ==
=== Studio albums ===
List of studio albums, with track listings
Title	Album details
Blue Girl	Released: 1989; Label: Capitol; Formats: LP, cassette, CD; Track listing: 1. "No Such Thing"; 2. "Played with Fire"; 3. "Blue Girl"; 4. "Middle of the Night"; 5. "Innocents Will Rise"; 6. "I Will Remain"; 7. "Slavery"; 8. "Get Back"; 9. "Runaway Dream"; 10. "Every Step of the Way"; 11. "How to Let Go"
Sanctuary	Released: 1994; Label: Beggar's Bliss; Formats: Cassette, CD; Track listing: 1. "Sanctuary"; 2. "Great Escape"; 3. "Will of the Gun"; 4. "Stay - Don't Go"; 5. "Garden of Love"; 6. "Break Down the Fences"; 7. "Moody Windows"; 8. "Livin' on the Edge"; 9. "Can't Go Back"; 10. "Nothing I Can Do"; 11. "Queen with a Vegas Taste"; 12. "No Longer Naïve"; 13. "The End"
Bloom	Released: 1995; Label: Bliss; Formats: CD; Track listing: 1. "Change Your Mind"; 2. "Moral"; 3. "Flowers in the Concrete"; 4. "Insanity Is King"; 5. "Talk to the Waves"; 6. "Love Is a Bomb"; 7. "Hurts My Dreams"; 8. "Best Waste of Time (535)"; 9. "Here and Now"; 10. "Polarize"; 11. "Enemy"
Tortured	Released: 1997; Label: A-ttack; Formats: CD; Track listing: 1. "Tortured"; 2. "Stop Shooting Me"; 3. "Cursed"; 4. "Realness"; 5. "Normal"; 6. "Die 4 U"; 7. "Whore"; 8. "Stuff"; 9. "L'Etat D'Amour"; 10. "Astronauts"; 11. "Friends"; 12. "For the Moon"
Talented Girl	Released: July 2, 2002; Label: Sextant; Formats: CD; Track listing: 1. "Nicotine"; 2. "Talented Girl"; 3. "Abductee"; 4. "Toilet Trained"; 5. "Chill Out"; 6. "Liar"; 7. "Everything"; 8. "I Explode"; 9. "Electric Chair"; 10. "Telepathy"; 11. "Far Out Far Out"
Wreck•Age	Released: April 16, 2019; Label: Self-released; Formats: Digital download; Track listing: 1. "Wounds"; 2. "Apocalips"; 3. "Not Afraid Anymore"; 4. "Save the World"; 5. "Listen"; 6. "Don't Argue with Angels (Sean's Song)"; 7. "Murder"; 8. "The One"; 9. "Revolving Doors"; 10. "Convince Me"; 11. "Head Around It"; 12. "Life Is What"

=== Compilation albums ===
List of compilation albums, with track listings
Title	Album details
Lost in the 80's	Released: February 23, 2023; Label: Dream Control Music; Formats: Digital download; Track listing: 1. "Slavery: Dancing with These Chains On"; 2. "Rhythm of the Silence"; 3. "Share a Little Lite"; 4. "Lord of the Dance"; 5. "Heartless Heart"; 6. "Can't Turn It Off"; 7. "Purpose in Life"; 8. "Arrow"; 9. "Last Night's Escapade" (live); 10. "Man Is a Lonely Beast"; 11. "Emotions Never Lie"; 12. "Take Good Care of My Love"

=== Singles ===
List of singles, with selected chart positions, showing year released and album name
Title	Year	Peak chart positions	Album
Title	Year	CAN	Album
"No Such Thing"	1989	51	Blue Girl
"Slavery"	1989	62	Blue Girl
"Middle of the Night"	1989	—	Blue Girl
"Sanctuary"	1994	62	Sanctuary
"Will of the Gun"	1994	—	Sanctuary
"Change Your Mind"	1996	—	Don't Argue with Her
"Moral"	1996	—	Don't Argue with Her
"Tortured"	1997	—	Tortured
"Wounds"	2019	—	Wreck•Age
"Apocalips"	2019	—	Wreck•Age
"Murder"	2019	—	Wreck•Age
"—" denotes items which were not released in that country or failed to chart.

=== Music videos ===
List of music videos, showing year released and directors
Title	Year	Director(s)
"No Such Thing"	1989	Don Allan
"Slavery"	1989	Don Allan
"Sanctuary"	1994	Michael Di Carlo
"Will of the Gun"	1994	—N/a
"Change Your Mind"	1996	Ulf Buddensieck
"Moral"	1996	Brent MacKay
"Flowers in the Concrete"	1996	Ulf Buddensieck
"Tortured"	1997	Adam Sliwinski
"I Explode"	2002	Tony Papa
"Nicotine"	2002	—N/a
"Apocalips"	2019	—N/a

== Filmography ==
Film, television, and video game
Year	Title	Role	Notes
2004	Need for Speed: Underground 2	Various voices	Voice only
2008	Left to Blossom	Lynn	
2009	The Portside	Pat	
2013	Supernatural	Possessed Woman	
2013	Untold Stories of the E.R.	Admin Nurse	
2016	Shut Eye	Homeless Woman	

== Composer ==
- Tall Tale Heart (2004)
- Rapid Fire (2006)
