= Ken Greer =

Canadian musician (born 1954)

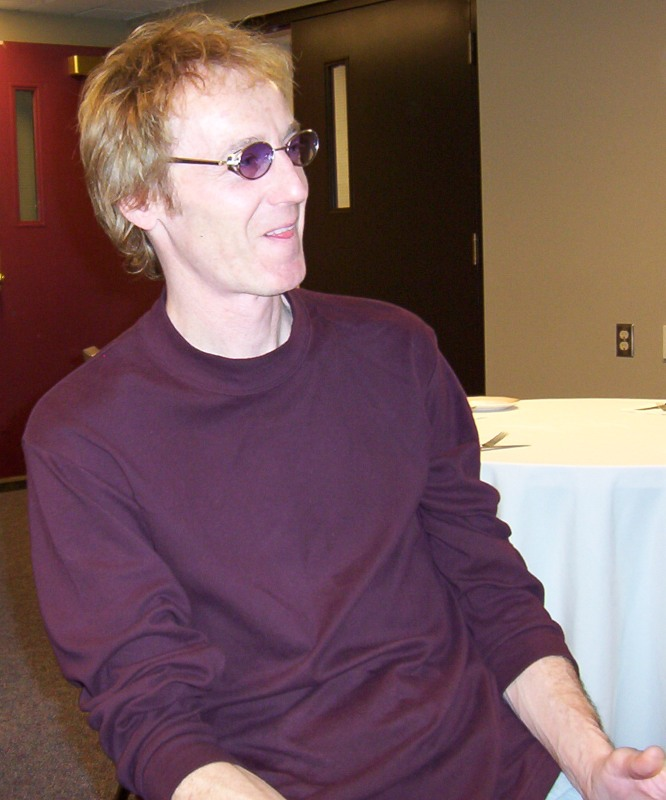
- Greer in 2003

Background information
- Born: 25 July 1954 (age 71)
- Origin: Toronto, Ontario, Canada
- Genres: Rock
- Occupations: Musician, producer
- Instruments: Guitar, keyboards
- Years active: 1971–present
- Website: ken-greer.com

Kenneth William Greer (born 25 July 1954) is a Canadian guitarist and keyboardist. He is one of the founding members of the Canadian rock band Red Rider.

== Biography ==
Greer is the youngest of seven children born into a musical family in Toronto, Ontario. He grew up in the North Toronto area. He played the pedal steel guitar.

After a Red Rider hiatus during most of the 1990s, Greer was involved in numerous musical projects, including Big Faith, Hunter-Greer and Gowan. Currently, he still tours with Tom Cochrane and Red Rider, playing guitar, pedal steel and keyboards. He also started touring with the Canadian country band The Road Hammers in 2005 and still joins them when available.

== Career achievements ==
Juno Awards

-Won for "Group of the Year" in 1987

-Nominated for 11 various awards from 1981 to 1990

Gold & Platinum Records
-Nearly every Red Rider record went Gold or Platinum in Canada, with the band's most commercially successful effort "Victory Day" achieving Double Platinum.

Canadian Country Music Awards

-Won for All-Star Band Member, Steel Guitar in 2005 & 2007

== Discography ==
- 1980 – Red Rider – Don't Fight It
- 1981 – Red Rider – As Far as Siam
- 1983 – Red Rider – Neruda
- 1984 – Red Rider – Breaking Curfew
- 1986 – Tom Cochrane & Red Rider – S/T
- 1988 – Tom Cochrane & Red Rider – Victory Day
- 1989 – Tom Cochrane & Red Rider – The Symphony Sessions (live CD)
- 1992 – Big Faith – Grounded
- 1993 – Tom Cochrane – Ashes to Diamonds A Collection
- 1994 – Big Faith – Undertow
- 1994 – Hunter-Greer – Tales From Stoney's Bar & Grill
- 2002 – Tom Cochrane & Red Rider – Trapeze
- 2006 – Tom Cochrane – No Stranger
- 2015 – Tom Cochrane – Take It Home

== Producer ==
- 1987 – The Tragically Hip – The Tragically Hip EP
- 1989 – The Saddletramps – The Saddle Tramps
- 1994 – Peter Randall & The Raindogs – Peter Randall & The Raindogs
- 2002 – Andrew Brunet – Broken
- 2002 – Various Artists – Takin' Care of Christmas
- 2004 – Tango Sierra – This Is It

== Official website ==
- Official Ken Greer website

== Appearances on other albums as musician ==
- 1990 – Lost Brotherhood – Gowan
- 1993 – ...But You Can Call Me Larry – Lawrence Gowan
- 1994 – Borrowed Tunes: A Tribute to Neil Young – "Heart of Gold" Lawrence Gowan
