= Red Rider =

Canadian rock band

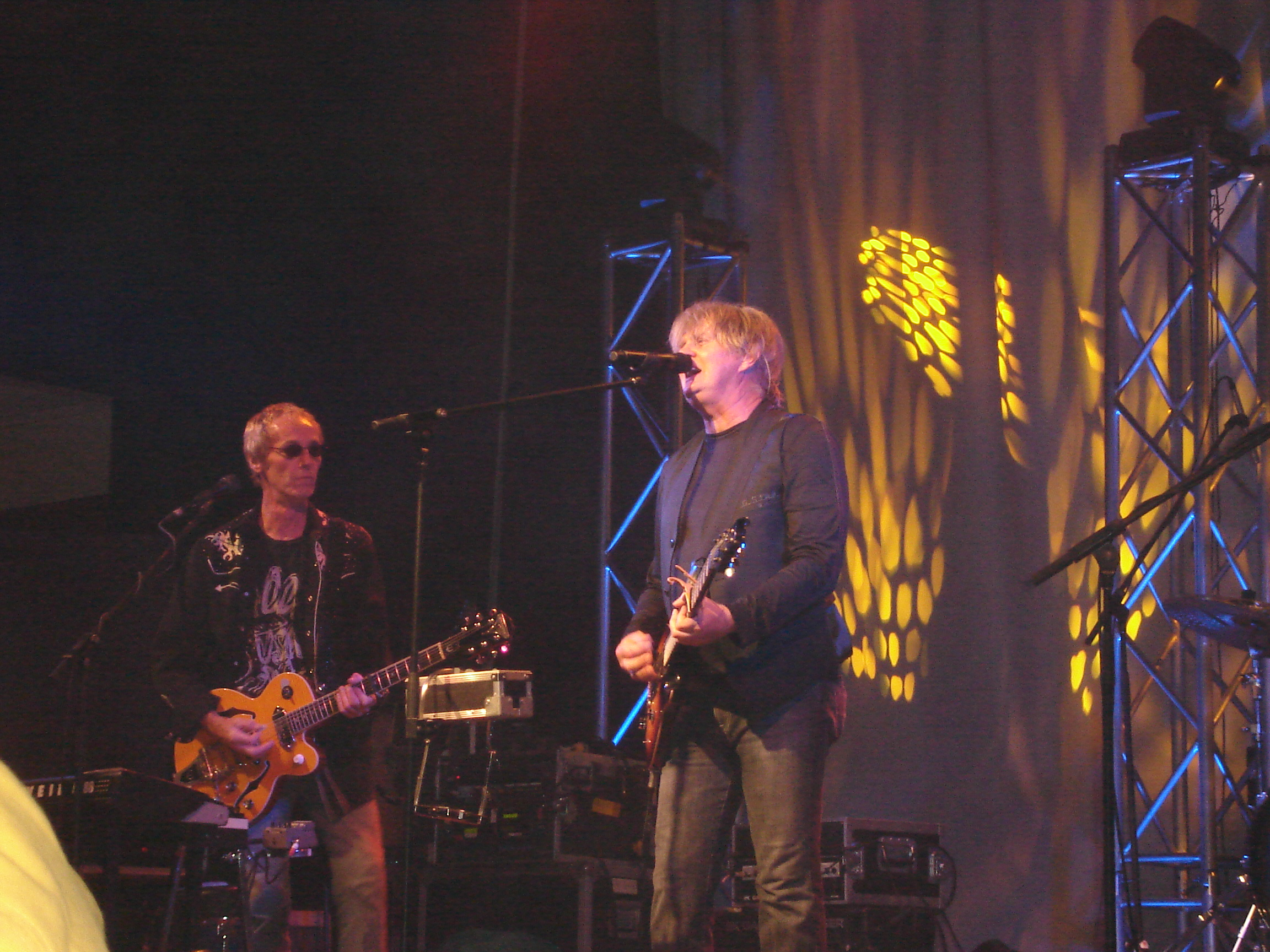
- Tom Cochrane & Red Rider perform in Halifax August 2007

Background information
- Also known as: Tom Cochrane & Red Rider
- Origin: Toronto, Ontario, Canada
- Genres: Heartland rock; AOR; new wave
- Years active: 1975–1990, 2002–present
- Labels: Capitol, RCA
- Members: Ken Greer; Tom Cochrane; Jeff Jones; Davide Direnzo; Gary Craig
- Past members: Rob Baker; Peter Boynton; Jon Checkowski; Arvo Lepp; Steve Sexton; John Webster; Ken "Spider" Sinnaeve; Randall Coryell; Peter Mueller; Jamie Oakes; Randall "Mongo" Stoll; Troy Feener; Bill Bell; Gary Craig

Red Rider, later known as Tom Cochrane & Red Rider, is a Canadian rock band who were popular in the 1980s. While they achieved significant success in Canada, the band never had a song in the top 40 in the United States, although "Lunatic Fringe" from their second album, 1981's As Far as Siam, became popular on US album-oriented rock radio. They also charted on the Billboard Hot 100 with "White Hot" from their debut album Don't Fight It (1979) and "Young Thing, Wild Dreams (Rock Me)" from Breaking Curfew (1984), and charted comparably to "Lunatic Fringe" on Mainstream Rock (AOR) with "Big League", "Human Race", and "Power", the latter two tracks off 1983's Neruda.

== Band history ==
=== As Red Rider ===
Red Rider was formed in Toronto in 1975 when Peter Boynton (keyboards, synthesizers, vocals), Ken Greer (guitars, keyboards, backing vocals) and Rob Baker (drums) joined up with Arvo Lepp (guitar) and Jon Checkowski (bass) and began playing around Toronto, performing both original and cover music.

In 1978, their manager at that time was contacted by Capitol Records about adding singer/guitarist/composer Tom Cochrane to the group. Cochrane was invited to one of the band's gigs in London, Ontario to rehearse with them. Boynton, Greer and Baker were impressed with his playing and songwriting but Lepp and Checkowski were not as enthused and decided to leave the band. Jeff Jones (formerly with Ocean and who briefly played for Rush) was then brought in on bass, and it was the lineup of Cochrane, Boynton, Greer, Baker and Jones that were signed to Capitol and released their first album Don't Fight It in October 1979. With the singles "White Hot" and "Don't Fight It", the album quickly reached gold status.

Their second album, As Far as Siam, was released in June 1981 and featured the hit "Lunatic Fringe", which featured the memorable steel guitar playing of Greer. The song was used in the 1985 movie Vision Quest, appeared in the Miami Vice episode "Smuggler's Blues" and saw high rotation on the United States cable network MTV. It is now a mainstay on American classic rock radio.

Peter Boynton was replaced by keyboardist Steve Sexton on Red Rider's third album Neruda, released in March 1983, and the track "Napoleon Sheds His Skin" would become one of the more popular songs from the album, while "Human Race" picked up considerable FM radio airplay in the US, becoming their second best known song there after "Lunatic Fringe". Moreover, the song "Can't Turn Back" was used in the Miami Vice episode "Tale of the Goat".

For their next release, Breaking Curfew (September 1984), John Webster (formerly with Canadian soft rockers Stonebolt) replaced Sexton on keyboards. The album did not sell as well as Neruda and a dispute with Bruce Allen, the band's manager, over the future direction of the band resulted in Red Rider's departure from the Bruce Allen camp and a change in band members, as Jeff Jones and Rob Baker left. The album did contain the band's top-charting single in the US, "Young Thing, Wild Dreams (Rock Me)", which reached number 71 on the Billboard Hot 100.

=== As Tom Cochrane & Red Rider ===
In what became a strong signal regarding the future of the band, they officially became known as Tom Cochrane & Red Rider. The line-up consisted of Cochrane, Greer, and Webster with new member Ken "Spider" Sinnaeve on bass. For the first album under this revised name (their fifth overall), the group issued the self-titled Tom Cochrane and Red Rider LP in May 1986. Sessioneer Graham Broad (Go West and Roger Waters' band) played drums on the album, recorded in Wales at Rockfield Studios and Metalworks Studios in Mississauga, Ontario over the early months of 1985, produced by Patrick Moran. After the release of the album, Randall Coryell was added to the official lineup for live dates, as was guitarist Peter Mueller; this six-piece version of the band would last through early 1990.

In 1987, Capitol released a compilation CD titled Over 60 Minutes with Red Rider, covering the band's first four albums. Also in 1987, the band, who had been nominated 11 times for Juno Awards, finally was awarded one for Group of the Year.

In the fall of 1988, the band (now a sextet) released their sixth album, Victory Day, which contained the track "Big League", about the death of a young hockey player. The young man's father approached Cochrane on the day of a concert, mentioning that his son was a big fan of Red Rider's song "Boy Inside The Man". Cochrane asked the man if his son was going to be attending the concert and the man responded that his son had recently died in a car accident. Cochrane wrote the song as a memorial, and it became a big hit in Canada (reaching #4), as well as a top 10 hit on US rock radio.

Red Rider's final album, The Symphony Sessions, which was recorded on March 17 and 18, 1989, and released in December 1989, saw the band performing with the Edmonton Symphony Orchestra, as Procol Harum had done seventeen years before. The band broke up in early 1990, shortly after the album was released. Cochrane embarked on a successful solo career, employing Webster and Sinnaeve as part of his backing band.

The three-CD box set Ashes to Diamonds, which includes material by both Red Rider and Cochrane as a solo artist, was released in 1993.

=== Reformation (2002–present) ===
Cochrane, Greer, and Jones reunited as Red Rider in 2002 to play a benefit show after their 1980s guitar tech, John Garrish, was mugged and stabbed to death in the Yorkville section of Toronto. Since that time, Tom Cochrane and Red Rider have continued to tour annually, with Cochrane, Greer, and Jones being the mainstays of this revived version of the group. Keyboardist Webster was involved for a time between 2003 and 2006; current members Davide Direnzo (drums) and Bill Bell (guitar) both joined in 2006, though Bell dropped out for several years (2012–2016) before rejoining.

Professional wrestler Kurt Angle used an instrumental version of "Lunatic Fringe" as his entrance music in TNA. UFC fighter and former Pride Champion Dan "Hendo" Henderson also uses "Lunatic Fringe" as his intro song.

== Members ==
Current members

- Ken Greer – guitars, keyboards, backing vocals (1975–1990, 2002–present)
- Tom Cochrane – vocals, guitar (1978–1990, 2002–present)
- Jeff Jones – bass, backing vocals (1978–1985, 2002–present)
- Davide Direnzo – drums (2006–present)
- Bill Bell – guitar (2006-2011, 2017–present)

Former members

- Rob Baker – drums (1975–1985)
- Peter Boynton – keyboards, synthesizers, vocals (1975–1982)
- Jon Checkowski – bass (1975–1978)
- Arvo Lepp – guitar (1975–1978)
- Steve Sexton - keyboards, synthesizers (1982-1984)
- John Webster – keyboards, synthesizers (1984–1989, 2003–2006)
- Ken "Spider" Sinnaeve – bass (1985–1990)
- Randall Coryell – drums (1986–1990)
- Peter Mueller – guitar (1986–1989)
- Jamie Oakes – guitar (2002–2006)
- Randall "Mongo" Stoll – drums (1998-2019)
- Troy Feener – drums (2002–2006; 2009 – fill in for Direnzo)
- Gary Craig – drums (2007 and 2009 – fill in for Direnzo)

Timeline

== Discography ==
=== Studio albums ===
==== As Red Rider ====
- Don't Fight It (1979) - Platinum in Canada
- As Far as Siam (1981) - Platinum in Canada
- Neruda (1983) - Platinum in Canada
- Breaking Curfew (1984)

==== Tom Cochrane & Red Rider ====
- Tom Cochrane and Red Rider (1986) - Platinum in Canada
- Victory Day (1988) - Platinum in Canada
- The Symphony Sessions (1989) - Platinum in Canada

=== Compilation albums ===
- Over 60 Minutes with Red Rider (1987)
- Ashes to Diamonds (1993)
- Trapeze: The Collection (2002)

=== Singles ===
Year	Title	Chart peak				Album
Year	Title	CAN	AUS	US	US Main	Album
1980	"White Hot"	20	—	48	—	Don't Fight It
1980	"Don't Fight It"	75	—	— (Note: "Don't Fight It" did not enter the Hot 100, but peaked at number 3 on Bubbling Under the Hot 100, which acts as an extension of the Hot 100.)	—	Don't Fight It
1981	"What Have You Got To Do"	42	—	—	—	As Far as Siam
1981	"Lunatic Fringe"	—	52	—	11	As Far as Siam
1983	"Human Race"	29	—	—	11	Neruda
1983	"Power (Strength in Numbers)"	—	—	—	13	Neruda
1983	"Crack the Sky (Breakaway)"	—	—	—	39	Neruda
1984	"Young Thing, Wild Dreams (Rock Me)"	44	—	71	13	Breaking Curfew
1984	"Breaking Curfew"	93	—	—	—	Breaking Curfew
1986	"Boy Inside The Man"	25	—	—	17	Tom Cochrane and Red Rider
1986	"The Untouchable One"	70	—	—	48	Tom Cochrane and Red Rider
1987	"One More Time (Some Old Habits)"	85	—	—	—	Tom Cochrane and Red Rider
1987	"Ocean Blues (Emotion Blue)"	88	—	—	—	Tom Cochrane and Red Rider
1988	"Big League"	4	—	—	9	Victory Day
1989	"Calling America"	—	—	—	42	Victory Day
1989	"Good Times"	2	—	—	—	Victory Day
1989	"Victory Day"	32	—	—	—	Victory Day
1989	"Different Drummer"	67	—	—	—	Victory Day
1989	"White Hot" (Live)	50	—	—	—	The Symphony Sessions
