= Lunatic Fringe (song) =

1981 single by Red Rider

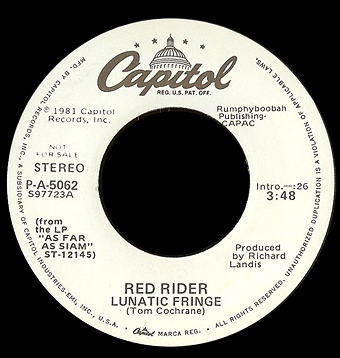

Single by Red Rider

from the album As Far as Siam
- B-side: "Cowboys in Hong Kong (As Far as Siam)"
- Released: 1981
- Studio: Sunset Sound (Hollywood)
- Genre: Arena rock; pop rock
- Length: 4:23
- Label: Capitol
- Songwriter: Tom Cochrane
- Producer: Richard Landis

Red Rider singles chronology
"What Have You Got To Do" (1981)	"Lunatic Fringe" (1981)	"Human Race" (1983)

Music video
- "Lunatic Fringe" on YouTube

"Lunatic Fringe" is a song by Tom Cochrane released as a single by Canadian rock band Red Rider from their 1981 album, As Far as Siam.

In the US, the song reached No. 11 on the Rock Top Tracks radio airplay chart in Billboard in September 1981, and was awarded a SOCAN Classic award in 2009 by the Society of Composers, Authors and Music Publishers of Canada for reaching the 100,000-airplay mark on (Canadian) domestic radio.

== Background ==
Guitarist Tom Cochrane wrote the song after becoming concerned about a resurgence of anti-Semitism in the 1970s, and was also inspired after reading a book about Raoul Wallenberg, who rescued Jews from The Holocaust during World War II. Some sources have incorrectly cited the murder of John Lennon as the song's primary inspiration; Cochrane had already written the song before Lennon was killed, but recorded the song's first demo the evening of the murder. He has stated that his feelings about the event, and how it echoed the theme of his song, galvanized him to release the song as a single despite advice from the record label that the song was not commercial enough.

== Charts ==
Chart (1981/82)	Position
U.S. Billboard Mainstream Rock Tracks	11
Australia (Kent Music Report)	52

== Legacy ==
In 1997, Tom Cochrane re-recorded the track for his album, Songs of a Circling Spirit, which charted on the RPM Top 100 Singles chart for four weeks, peaking at No. 70.

In 2009, the song was ranked No. 82 on VH1's 100 greatest one-hit wonders of the 1980s.
