= Jeff Jones (bassist) =

American-Canadian bassist (born 1953)

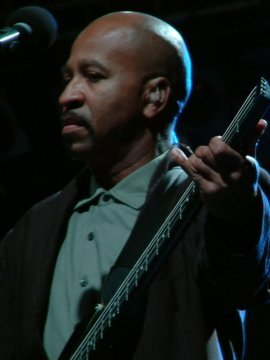
- Jones with Tom Cochrane in 2003

Background information
- Born: Jeffrey Robin Jones; September 20, 1953 (age 73); Chicago, Illinois, U.S.
- Origin: London, Ontario, Canada
- Genre: Rock
- Occupation: Musician
- Instruments: Bass; vocals
- Years active: 1968–present
- Label: Roar Records Canada
- Member of: Red Rider; The Carpet Frogs; Tom Cochrane Band; The Guess Who
- Formerly of: Rush; Ocean; Stingaree; Infidels
- Website: Official website

Jeffrey Robin Jones (born September 20, 1953) is an American-Canadian bassist who was formerly a member of Ocean and an early incarnation of Rush, and is currently a member of Red Rider and a touring member of The Guess Who.

== Career ==
Jones performed with Alex Lifeson and John Rutsey in the first incarnation of Rush, serving as the primary singer and bassist in the summer of 1968. He was replaced by Geddy Lee in September 1968 before their second performance after reportedly wanting to go to a party, something Jones denies. He first gained fame as a member of the gospel rock band Ocean, which recorded a million-selling 1971 single of Gene MacLellan's "Put Your Hand in the Hand". The group disbanded in 1975. Jones later joined Red Rider, performing bass on their 1981 hit "Lunatic Fringe", and still performs with leader Tom Cochrane. He also works on videos showing Eastwood basses.

In the late 1970s, Jones played bass and sang in Stingaree, a Toronto-based band featuring Brian MacLeod and Bernie LaBarge on guitars and vocals, Doug (Skip) Layton on drums, and Larry Hamel (replaced by Don Harriss) on vocals and piano. The band had a large following in Ontario. Brian MacLeod was spotted by promoter Martin Onrot while Stingaree was playing in Toronto and left the band to join Chilliwack. The remaining members of Stingaree played for another six months before disbanding in 1978. Jones also played bass on the 1981 hit "Dream Away" by LaBarge.

Jones is a regular member of Toronto band The Carpet Frogs, who also serve as The Burton Cummings band. He also continues to tour with Tom Cochrane.

In June 2018, Jones, along with the group Roar, released the single "Naked in the Church" on Roar Records. Chris Crerar completed the mastering on this project while it was produced by Kevin Dietz at the Metalworks Studios in Toronto.

In 2025, he was announced as the bassist for The Guess Who's reunion tour to take place in 2026.
