= Bob Clearmountain production discography =

Discography

Selected mixing, engineering, and production credits of Bob Clearmountain.

== Selected discography ==
Selected mixing, engineering, and production credits

Year	Album/Song	Artist	Producer	Engineer	Mixing	Ref
1974	Light of Worlds	Kool & the Gang	No	Yes	No	
1974	Widescreen	Rupert Holmes	No	Yes	No	
1974	Keep On Bumpin' & Masterplan	Kay Gees	No	Yes	No	
1975	Nasty Gal	Betty Davis	No	Yes	Yes	
1975	Circle of Love	Sister Sledge	No	Yes	No	
1975	Electronic Realizations for Rock Orchestra	Synergy	No	No	Yes	
1976	Stranger in the City	John Miles	No	Yes	No	
1976	Romeo & Juliet	Hubert Laws	Yes	Yes	No	
1976	Just a Matter of Time	Marlena Shaw	No	Yes	Yes	
1976	Big Beat	Sparks	No	Yes	No	
1977	Leave Home	Ramones	No	Yes	No	
1977	New Vintage	Maynard Ferguson	No	Yes	Yes	
1977	Chic	Chic	No	Yes	No	
1977	Lady Put the Light Out	Frankie Valli	No	Yes	No	
1978	C'est Chic	Chic	No	No	Yes	
1978	Norma Jean	Norma Jean Wright	No	Yes	Yes	
1978	Can't Stand the Rezillos	The Rezillos	Yes	No	Yes	
1978	"Miss You" (single & 12" single)	The Rolling Stones	No	No	Yes	
1978	Jorge Santana	Jorge Santana	Yes	No	No	
1978	Tuff Darts!	Tuff Darts	Yes	No	Yes	
1979	Risqué	Chic	No	Yes	No	
1979	You're Never Alone with a Schizophrenic	Ian Hunter	No	Yes	No	
1979	We Are Family	Sister Sledge	No	Yes	No	
1979	Tom Verlaine	Tom Verlaine	No	No	Yes	
1979	The Dance of Life	Narada Michael Walden	Yes	Yes	Yes	
1980	Catholic Boy	Jim Carroll Band	Yes	Yes	No	
1980	Flesh and Blood	Roxy Music	No	No	Yes	
1980	Rock 'N' Roll Enforcers	The Silencers	Yes	Yes	Yes	
1980	Love Somebody Today	Sister Sledge	No	No	Yes	
1980	"The Ties That Bind"	Bruce Springsteen	No	Yes	No	
1980	"Hungry Heart"	Bruce Springsteen	No	No	Yes	
1980	Victory	Narada Michael Walden	Yes	Yes	No	
1981	You Want It You Got It	Bryan Adams	Yes	Yes	Yes	
1981	Of Skins and Heart	The Church	Yes	No	Yes	
1981	Escape Artist	Garland Jeffreys	Yes	No	Yes	
1981	Rock 'n' Roll Adult	Garland Jeffreys	Yes	No	No	
1981	Tattoo You	The Rolling Stones	No	No	Yes	
1981	Dead Ringer	Meat Loaf	No	No	Yes	
1981	Short Back 'n' Sides	Ian Hunter	No	No	Yes	
1981	In The World	G. E. Smith	Yes	Yes	Yes	
1982	The Blurred Crusade	The Church	Yes	No	Yes	
1982	"Rock the Casbah" (single)	The Clash	No	No	Yes	
1982	Picture This	Huey Lewis and the News	No	No	Yes	
1982	Creatures of the Night	Kiss	No	No	Yes	
1982	Men Without Women	Little Steven and the Disciples of Soul	No	Yes	No	
1982	Avalon	Roxy Music	No	No	Yes	
1982	Still Life	The Rolling Stones	No	Yes	Yes	
1983	Cuts Like a Knife	Bryan Adams	Yes	Yes	Yes	
1983	Let's Dance	David Bowie	No	No	Yes	
1983	Desperate	Divinyls	No	No	Yes	
1983	Rock 'n Soul Part 1	Hall & Oates	Yes	No	No	
1983	Sports	Huey Lewis and the News	No	No	Yes	
1983	Where Do They Go?	Mi-Sex	Yes	No	No	
1983	You Can't Fight Fashion	Michael Stanley Band	Yes	Yes	Yes	
1983	Undercover	The Rolling Stones	No	No	Yes	
1983	Guts for Love	Garland Jeffreys	Yes	No	No	
1984	Reckless	Bryan Adams	Yes	Yes	Yes	
1984	Voice of America	Little Steven	No	No	Yes	
1984	Born in the U.S.A.	Bruce Springsteen	No	No	Yes	
1984	Big Bam Boom	Hall & Oates	Yes	Yes	Yes	
1985	"Dancing in the Street"	David Bowie and Mick Jagger	No	No	Yes	
1985	"This Is Not America"	David Bowie and the Pat Metheny Group	No	No	Yes	
1985	Boys and Girls	Bryan Ferry	No	No	Yes	
1985	Live at the Apollo	Hall & Oates, David Ruffin, and Eddie Kendricks	Yes	Yes	Yes	
1985	"The Power of Love"	Huey Lewis and the News	No	No	Yes	
1985	"Only the Young"	Journey	No	No	Yes	
1985	Once Upon a Time	Simple Minds	Yes	No	No	
1985	"Voices Carry"	'Til Tuesday	No	No	Yes	
1986	Live 1975–85	Bruce Springsteen and the E Street Band	No	No	Yes	
1986	Three Hearts in the Happy Ending Machine	Daryl Hall	No	No	Yes	
1986	"The Power of Love"	Huey Lewis & The News	No	No	Yes	
1986	Raised on Radio	Journey	No	No	Yes	
1986	Get Close	The Pretenders	Yes	No	No	
1986	"Mothers Talk" (US remix)	Tears for Fears	No	No	Yes	
1986	"Back Where You Started"	Tina Turner	Yes	Yes	Yes	
1987	Into the Fire	Bryan Adams	Yes	Yes	Yes	
1987	Never Let Me Down	David Bowie	No	No	Yes	
1987	"Just like Heaven" (single mix)	The Cure	No	No	Yes	
1987	Robbie Robertson	Robbie Robertson	No	No	Yes	
1987	Tunnel of Love	Bruce Springsteen	No	No	Yes	
1987	Kick	INXS	No	No	Yes	
1987	A Very Special Christmas	Various	Yes	No	Yes	
1988	Live! Live! Live!	Bryan Adams	No	No	Yes	
1988	Temple of Low Men	Crowded House	No	No	Yes	
1988	"Dignity" (1988 re-release)	Deacon Blue	No	No	Yes	
1988	Temperamental	Divinyls	No	No	Yes	
1989	Charlie Sexton	Charlie Sexton	Yes	No	No	
1989	Strange Angels	Laurie Anderson	No	No	Yes	
1989	"Woman in Chains"	Tears for Fears feat. Oleta Adams	No	No	Yes	
1990	Ghost of a Dog	Edie Brickell & New Bohemians	No	No	Yes	
1990	Wiseblood	King Swamp	No	No	Yes	
1990	Tripping the Live Fantastic	Paul McCartney	Yes	No	Yes	
1990	"Rise" (remix)	Public Image Ltd	No	No	Yes	
1990	Heart Still Beating	Roxy Music	No	No	Yes	
1990	Join Together	The Who	No	No	Yes	
1990	"Softly Whispering I Love You"	Paul Young	No	No	Yes	
1990	"Oh Girl"	Paul Young	No	No	Yes	
1991	Waking Up the Neighbours	Bryan Adams	No	No	Yes	
1991	Altered State	Altered State	No	No	Yes	
1991	Woodface	Crowded House	No	No	Yes	
1991	On Every Street	Dire Straits	No	No	Yes	
1991	"All Right Now" (1991 remix)	Free	No	No	Yes	
1991	Storyville	Robbie Robertson	No	No	Yes	
1991	Play	Squeeze	No	No	Yes	
1992	Matters of the Heart	Tracy Chapman	No	No	Yes	
1992	Welcome to Wherever You Are	INXS	No	No	Yes	
1992	In the Running	Howard Jones	No	No	Yes	
1992	Human Touch	Bruce Springsteen	No	No	Yes	
1992	Lucky Town	Bruce Springsteen	No	No	Yes	
1993	So Far So Good	Bryan Adams	Yes	No	Yes	
1993	Together Alone	Crowded House	No	No	Yes	
1993	Taxi	Bryan Ferry	No	No	Yes	
1993	Full Moon, Dirty Hearts	INXS	No	No	Yes	
1993	Phobia	The Kinks	No	No	Yes	
1993	Whatever	Aimee Mann	No	No	Yes	
1993	Beethoven Was Deaf	Morrissey	No	No	Yes	
1993	Across the Borderline	Willie Nelson	No	No	Yes	
1993	The Love of Hopeless Causes	New Model Army	No	No	Yes	
1993	Rumble Doll	Patti Scialfa	No	No	Yes	
1993	In Concert/MTV Plugged	Bruce Springsteen	No	No	Yes	
1993	Some Fantastic Place	Squeeze	No	No	Yes	
1993	Kingdom of Desire	Toto	No	No	Yes	
1994	"Always"	Bon Jovi	No	No	Yes	
1994	Mamouna	Bryan Ferry	No	No	Yes	
1994	Waymore's Blues (Part II)	Waylon Jennings	No	No	Yes	
1994	"I Fall To Pieces"	Aaron Neville & Trisha Yearwood	No	No	Yes	
1994	Gaia: One Woman's Journey	Olivia Newton-John	No	No	Yes	
1994	Last of the Independents	The Pretenders	No	No	Yes	
1994	Voodoo Lounge	The Rolling Stones	No	No	Yes	
1994	It's Only Rock 'n Roll (Remastered)	The Rolling Stones	No	No	Yes	
1994	"Streets of Philadelphia"	Bruce Springsteen	No	No	Yes	
1994	Woodstock 94	Various	No	No	Yes	
1994	"Love Is All Around"	Wet Wet Wet	No	No	Yes	
1995	Forgiven, Not Forgotten	The Corrs	No	No	Yes	
1995	These Days	Bon Jovi	No	No	Yes	
1995	"Have You Ever Really Loved a Woman?"	Bryan Adams	No	No	Yes	
1995	Collective Soul	Collective Soul	No	No	Yes	
1995	Twisted	Del Amitri	No	No	Yes	
1995	"You Got It"	Bonnie Raitt	No	No	Yes	
1995	"Rock Steady"	Bonnie Raitt with Bryan Adams	No	No	Yes	
1995	Stripped	The Rolling Stones	No	No	Yes	
1995	Picture This	Wet Wet Wet	No	No	Yes	
1996	18 til I Die	Bryan Adams	No	No	Yes	
1996	Boys for Pele	Tori Amos	No	No	Yes	
1996	Only Human	Dina Carroll	No	No	Yes	
1996	A Few Small Repairs	Shawn Colvin	No	No	Yes	
1996	That Thing You Do! (soundtrack)	The Wonders	No	No	Yes	
1996	"I Finally Found Someone"	Barbra Streisand & Bryan Adams	No	No	Yes	
1996	Coming Up Close: A Retrospective	'Til Tuesday	No	No	Yes	
1996	Book of Shadows	Zakk Wylde	No	No	Yes	
1997	Bryan Adams: Unplugged	Bryan Adams	No	Yes	Yes	
1997	"I Can't Read" (single)	David Bowie	No	No	Yes	
1997	10 Cent Wings	Jonatha Brooke	No	Yes	No	
1997	Talk on Corners	The Corrs	No	No	Yes	
1997	Firecracker	Lisa Loeb	No	No	Yes	
1997	Blue Moon Swamp	John Fogerty	No	No	Yes	
1997	10	Wet Wet Wet	No	No	Yes	
1998	On a Day Like Today	Bryan Adams	No	No	Yes	
1998	Across a Wire: Live in New York City	Counting Crows	No	No	Yes	
1998	dada	dada	No	No	Yes	
1998	Undiscovered Soul	Richie Sambora	No	No	Yes	
1998	Feeling Strangely Fine	Semisonic	No	No	Yes	
1998	Humming	Duncan Sheik	No	No	Yes	
1998	Tracks	Bruce Springsteen	No	No	Yes	
1998	Rufus Wainwright	Rufus Wainwright	No	No	Yes	
1999	Best of Me	Bryan Adams	Yes	Yes	Yes	
1999	The Corrs: Unplugged	The Corrs	No	No	Yes	
1999	"Radio"	The Corrs	No	No	Yes	
1999	Breakdown	Melissa Etheridge	No	No	Yes	
1999	"Black Balloon"	Goo Goo Dolls	No	No	Yes	
1999	Magnolia (soundtrack)	Aimee Mann	No	No	Yes	
1999	Tuesday's Child	Amanda Marshall	No	No	Yes	
1999	Messenger	Edwin McCain	No	No	Yes	
1999	¡Viva El Amor!	The Pretenders	No	No	Yes	
1999	"Secret Smile"	Semisonic	No	No	Yes	
1999	Heart and Soul: New Songs from Ally McBeal	Vonda Shepard	No	No	Yes	
1999	By 7:30	Vonda Shepard	No	No	Yes	
2000	Bachelor No. 2 or, the Last Remains of the Dodo	Aimee Mann	No	No	Yes	
2000	The New America	Bad Religion	No	No	Yes	
2000	Crush	Bon Jovi	No	No	Yes	
2000	The Road to El Dorado (soundtrack)	Elton John	No	No	Yes	
2000	All About Chemistry	Semisonic	No	No	Yes	
2000	Automatic	Dweezil Zappa	No	No	Yes	
2001	Steady Pull	Jonatha Brooke	Yes	Yes	Yes	
2001	Whole New You	Shawn Colvin	No	No	Yes	
2001	Orphan	Darwin's Waiting Room	No	No	Yes	
2001	"Superman (It's Not Easy)" (single)	Five for Fighting	No	No	Yes	
2001	Plan B	Huey Lewis and the News	No	No	Yes	
2001	Love, Shelby	Shelby Lynne	No	No	Yes	
2001	"Boss of Me"	They Might Be Giants	No	No	Yes	
2002	Spirit: Stallion of the Cimarron (soundtrack)	Bryan Adams	No	No	Yes	
2002	"Girls of Summer"	Aerosmith	No	No	Yes	
2002	Bounce	Bon Jovi	No	No	Yes	
2002	The Naked Ride Home	Jackson Browne	No	No	Yes	
2002	VH1 Presents: The Corrs, Live in Dublin	The Corrs	No	No	Yes	
2002	Frantic	Bryan Ferry	No	No	Yes	
2002	À la vie, à la mort !	Johnny Hallyday	No	No	Yes	
2002	Become You	Indigo Girls	No	No	Yes	
2002	Development	Nonpoint	No	No	Yes	
2003	Live at the Budokan	Bryan Adams	No	No	Yes	
2003	"This Is the Night"	Clay Aiken	No	No	Yes	
2003	"Invisible"	Clay Aiken	No	No	Yes	
2003	This Left Feels Right	Bon Jovi	No	No	Yes	
2003	A Present for Everyone	Busted	No	No	Yes	
2003	"Low"	Kelly Clarkson	No	No	Yes	
2003	"100 Years"	Five for Fighting	No	No	Yes	
2003	"Tal Vez"	Ricky Martin	No	No	Yes	
2003	Loneliness Knows My Name	Patrick Park	No	No	Yes	
2003	"Overdrive"	Katy Rose	No	No	Yes	
2003	Live	Roxy Music	No	No	Yes	
2003	Avalon (SACD reissue)	Roxy Music	No	No	Yes	
2003	"Somebody Like You" (radio remix)	Keith Urban	No	No	Yes	
2004	Room Service	Bryan Adams	No	No	Yes	
2004	"Thunderbirds / 3AM"	Busted	No	No	Yes	
2004	Two	The Calling	No	No	Yes	
2004	Heart & Soul	Joe Cocker	No	No	Yes	
2004	Everyone Is Here	Finn Brothers	No	No	Yes	
2004	Deja Vu All Over Again	John Fogerty	No	No	Yes	
2004	Alfie	Mick Jagger and Dave Stewart	No	No	Yes	
2004	Live Licks	The Rolling Stones	No	No	Yes	
2005	Wildflower	Sheryl Crow	No	No	Yes	
2005	Je deviens moi	Grégory Lemarchal	No	No	Yes	
2005	Winter Pays for Summer	Glen Phillips	No	No	Yes	
2005	Black & White 050505	Simple Minds	No	No	Yes	
2005	Nothing Is Sound	Switchfoot	No	No	Yes	
2005	Intensive Care	Robbie Williams	No	No	Yes	
2006	Barenaked Ladies Are Me	Barenaked Ladies	No	No	Yes	
2006	New Amsterdam: Live at Heineken Music Hall February 4–6, 2003	Counting Crows	No	No	Yes	
2006	Boys and Girls (SACD reissue)	Bryan Ferry	No	No	Yes	
2006	Ricky Martin: MTV Unplugged	Ricky Martin	No	No	Yes	
2006	Coming Up to Breathe	MercyMe	No	No	Yes	
2006	We Shall Overcome: The Seeger Sessions	Bruce Springsteen	No	No	Yes	
2006	Hammersmith Odeon, London '75	Bruce Springsteen and the E Street Band	No	No	Yes	
2007	Barenaked Ladies Are Men	Barenaked Ladies	No	No	Yes	
2007	Dylanesque	Bryan Ferry	No	No	Yes	
2007	Careful What You Wish For	Jonatha Brooke	No	No	Yes	
2007	This Is the Life	Amy Macdonald	No	No	Yes	
2008	11 (Bryan Adams album)	Bryan Adams	No	No	Yes	
2008	The Works	Jonatha Brooke	Yes	No	Yes	
2008	Shine a Light	The Rolling Stones	Yes	Yes	Yes	
2008	Save Me from Myself	Brian "Head" Welch	No	No	Yes	
2009	The Circle	Bon Jovi	No	No	Yes	
2009	Little White Lies	Fastball	No	No	Yes	
2009	The Blue Ridge Rangers Rides Again	John Fogerty	No	No	Yes	
2009	Coming Up for Air	Davy Knowles and Back Door Slam	Yes	No	No	
2009	Paraíso Express	Alejandro Sanz	No	No	Yes	
2009	Graffiti Soul	Simple Minds	No	No	Yes	
2009	The Greatest Day - Take That Present: The Circus Live	Take That	No	No	Yes	
2009	Pandemonium Ensues	Glenn Tilbrook and the Fluffers	No	No	Yes	
2010	Bare Bones	Bryan Adams	No	No	Yes	
2010	All in Good Time	Barenaked Ladies	No	No	Yes	
2010	Olympia	Bryan Ferry	No	No	Yes	
2010	Exile on Main St. (2010 Bonus Disc)	The Rolling Stones	No	No	Yes	
2011	August and Everything After: Live at Town Hall	Counting Crows	No	No	Yes	
2011	From the Dark Side of the Moon	Mary Fahl	No	No	Yes	
2011	Wild and Free	Ziggy Marley	No	No	Yes	
2011	Música + Alma + Sexo	Ricky Martin	No	No	Yes	
2011	Blessed	Lucinda Williams	No	No	Yes	
2011	Wonderland	Wonderland	No	No	Yes	
2012	I Thought I Was an Alien	Soko	No	No	Yes	
2012	Chimes of Freedom: The Songs of Bob Dylan	Various	No	No	Yes	
2012	We Walk the Line: A Celebration of the Music of Johnny Cash	Various	No	No	Yes	
2012	Wrecking Ball	Bruce Springsteen	No	No	Yes	
2012	Live at the Checkerboard Lounge, Chicago 1981	The Rolling Stones and Muddy Waters	No	No	Yes	
2013	Goin' Your Way	Neil Finn and Paul Kelly	No	No	Yes	
2013	Live at Sydney Opera House	Bryan Adams	No	No	Yes	
2013	Wrote a Song for Everyone	John Fogerty	No	No	Yes	
2014	Tracks of My Years	Bryan Adams	No	No	Yes	
2014	Carter Girl	Carlene Carter	No	No	Yes	
2014	Melody Road	Neil Diamond	No	No	Yes	
2014	Legend (30th anniversary 5.1 surround mix)	Bob Marley and the Wailers	No	No	Yes	
2015	Introducing Darlene Love	Darlene Love	No	No	Yes	
2015	Trinity My Dear	Mark Edgar Stuart	No	Yes	No	
2015	Tokyo Dome Live in Concert	Van Halen	No	No	Yes	
2015	Modern Blues	The Waterboys	No	No	Yes	
2016	Souvenir	Pop Etc	No	Yes	No	
2016	Vianney	Vianney	No	No	Yes	
2016	Totally Stripped	The Rolling Stones	No	No	Yes	
2016	Havana Moon	The Rolling Stones	No	No	Yes	
2017	Southern Blood	Gregg Allman	No	No	Yes	
2017	Nikka & Strings: Underneath and in Between	Nikka Costa	Yes	Yes	Yes	
2017	An Intimate Piano Session	Duke Ellington	No	Yes	No	
2017	Step Into Light	Fastball	No	No	Yes	
2017	Soulfire	Little Steven	Yes	No	Yes	
2017	The Knowledge	Squeeze	No	No	Yes	
2017	Out of All This Blue	The Waterboys	No	No	Yes	
2018	Music from Big Pink (50th Anniversary Super Deluxe Edition)	The Band	No	No	Yes	
2018	Springsteen on Broadway	Bruce Springsteen	No	No	Yes	
2019	The Savior (5.1 surround mix)	A Bad Think	No	No	Yes	
2019	The Band (50th Anniversary Edition)	The Band	No	No	Yes	
2019	American Rock 'n' Roll	Don Felder	No	No	Yes	
2019	Summer of Sorcery	Little Steven	No	No	Yes	
2019	40 Trips Around the Sun	Toto	No	No	Yes	
2020	Stage Fright (50th Anniversary Edition)	The Band	No	No	Yes	
2020	2020	Bon Jovi	No	No	Yes	
2020	Weather	Huey Lewis and the News	No	No	Yes	
2020	Steel Wheels Live	The Rolling Stones	No	No	Yes	
2022	Forgotten Toys	David Paich	No	No	Yes	
2020	Letter to You	Bruce Springsteen	No	No	Yes	
2022	X	A Bad Think	No	No	Yes	
2024	Avalon (Dolby Atmos reissue)	Roxy Music	No	No	Yes	
