= List of Bryan Adams touring band members =

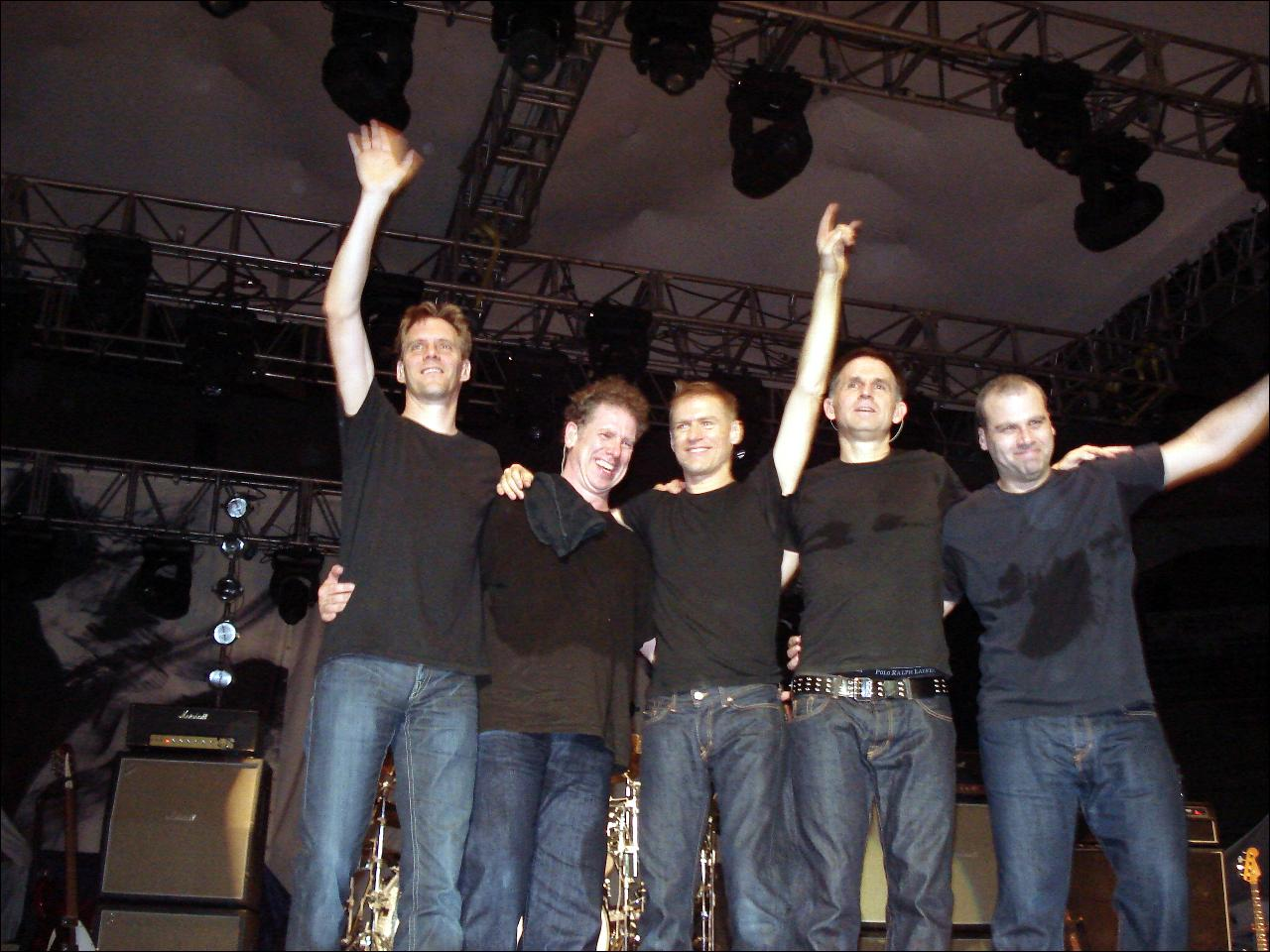
Bryan Adams and his band in 2006.

Bryan Adams formed his first solo touring band in the fall of 1981 to promote his second solo album, You Want It You Got It. The initial lineup featured lead guitarist Keith Scott, bassist Dave Reimer, keyboardist John Hannah and drummer Jimmy Wesley. The band's current incarnation includes constant member Scott alongside drummer Pat Steward (who first joined in 1984) and keyboardist Gary Breit (since 2002).

== History ==
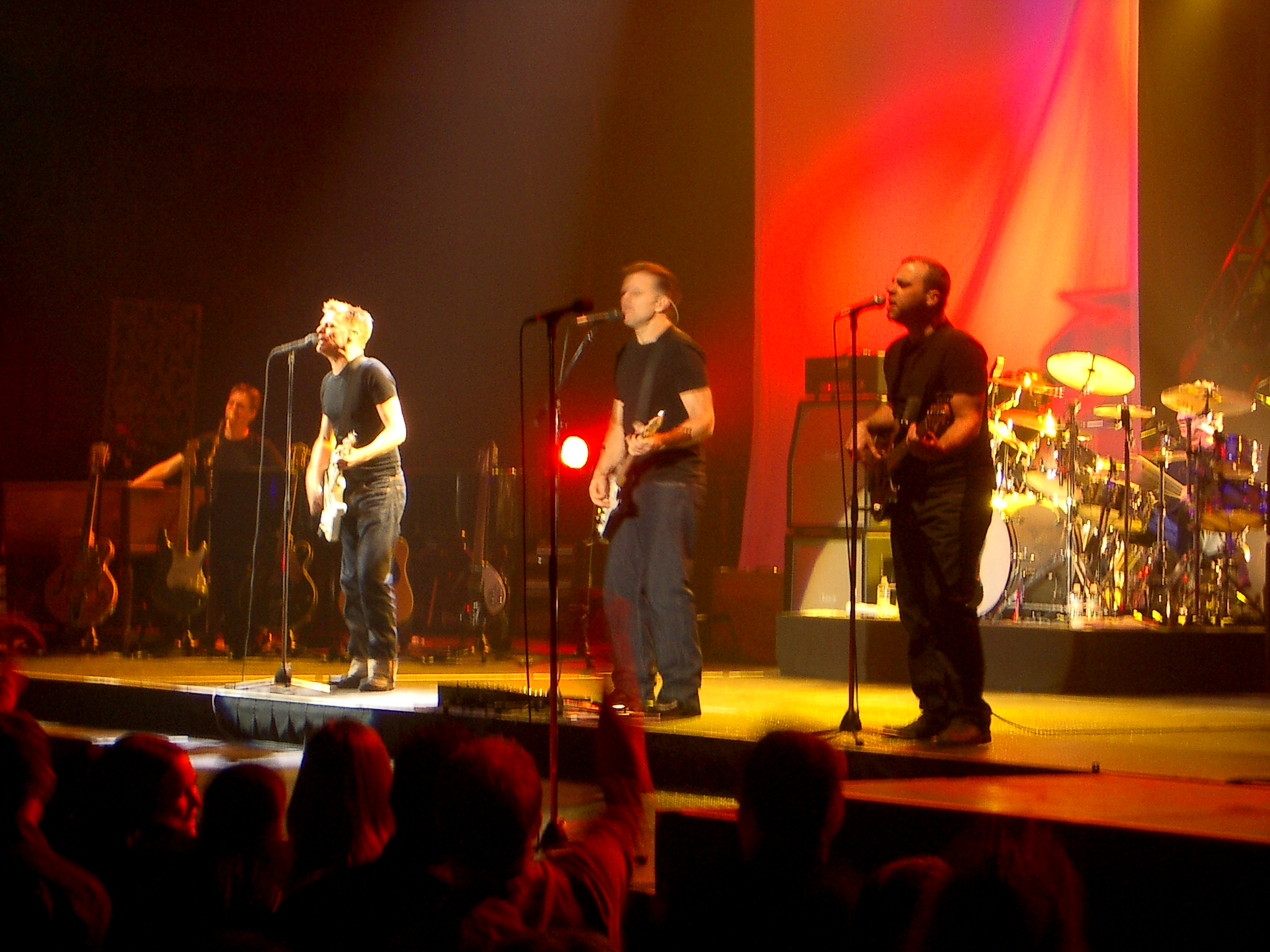
Adams and his band in Victoria, British Columbia in 2006

Adams formed his first solo touring band in the fall of 1981 to promote his second album, You Want It You Got It. The initial lineup featured lead guitarist Keith Scott, bassist Dave Reimer, keyboardist John Hannah and drummer Jimmy Wesley, although Reimer was replaced early on by Dave Taylor. The band toured throughout the first half of 1982, after which Adams recorded his third album Cuts Like a Knife; Scott and Taylor were featured on the album and the subsequent tour, with Hannah returning but Wesley replaced by Frankie LaRocka. Reckless followed in 1984, with the album's touring band featuring Pat Steward in place of LaRocka. The same lineup remained through shows in 1986, including the Conspiracy of Hope benefit concerts. After the release of Into the Fire in early 1987, Adams' studio drummer Mickey Curry finally joined his live band, having recently left Hall & Oates. Partway through the tour, keyboardist Tommy Mandel — another frequent studio collaborator of Adams' — took over from Hannah in the touring lineup.

The lineup of Scott, Taylor, Mandel and Curry remained stable for several years as Adams' backing band both in the studio and at live shows. After the release of 18 til I Die in 1996, Adams expanded his touring band to a six-piece with the addition of percussionist Danny Cummings. After an acoustic tour and the release of On a Day Like Today, Adams' band was reduced to a three-piece consisting of himself, Scott and Curry. This remained the case until 2002, when Norm Fisher took over on bass and Gary Breit joined on keyboards. Fisher remained until March 2016, when he was forced to step back to take care of his father. He was replaced by Phil Thornalley for the remainder of the tour. Beginning with the 2018 Ultimate Tour until 2024, bass has been handled by Solomon Walker. Adams then began playing bass when Walker continued his touring duties with Morrissey.

== Members ==
=== Current ===
Image	Name	Years active	Instruments	Release contributions
	Keith Scott	1981–present	lead guitar; backing vocals	all Bryan Adams releases from Cuts Like a Knife (1983) onwards, except Bare Bones (2010), Live at Sydney Opera House (2013), Classic and Classic Pt. II (2022)
	Pat Steward	1984–1986; 2021–present	drums; backing vocals	Reckless (1984); 11 (2008); Shine a Light (2019); So Happy It Hurts (2022); Live at the Royal Albert Hall (2023); Live at the Royal Albert Hall 2024 (2024); Roll with the Punches (2025)
	Gary Breit	2002–present	keyboards; backing vocals	all Bryan Adams releases from Room Service (2004) to Tracks of My Years (2014); Shine a Light (2019); Live at the Royal Albert Hall (2023); Live at the Royal Albert Hall 2024 (2024)

=== Former ===
Image	Name	Years active	Instruments	Release contributions
	John "Blitz" Hannah	1981–1988	keyboards; backing vocals	none
	Jimmy Wesley	1981–1982	drums; backing vocals	Cuts Like a Knife (1983) – backing vocals on one track only
	Dave Reimer	1981	bass; backing vocals	none
	Dave Taylor	1981–1998	bass; backing vocals	all Bryan Adams releases from Cuts Like a Knife (1983) to On a Day Like Today (1998); Wembley 1996 Live (2016)
	Frankie LaRocka	1983–1984 (died 2005)	drums; backing vocals	none
	Tommy Mandel	1981–1998	keyboards; backing vocals	all Bryan Adams releases from You Want It You Got It (1981) to Waking Up the Neighbours (1991); Unplugged (1997); Wembley 1996 Live (2016)
	Mickey Curry	1987–2021	drums; backing vocals	all Bryan Adams releases from You Want It You Got It (1981) to 11 (2008); Tracks of My Years (2014); Wembley 1996 Live (2016); Shine a Light (2019)
	Danny Cummings	1996–1998	percussion; backing vocals	Unplugged (1997); On a Day Like Today (1998); Wembley 1996 Live (2016)
	Norm Fisher (Note: Norm Fisher (b. 22 October 1963) is a Canadian session musician who has also performed with Burton Cummings, Randy Bachman, Powder Blues Band, Long John Baldry, Paul Dean and Colin James. He left the band to care for his father.)	2002–2016	bass; backing vocals	Room Service (2004); Live in Lisbon (2005); 11 (2008)
	Phil Thornalley	2016–2017	bass; backing vocals	On a Day Like Today (1998); Room Service (2004); Get Up (2015); Shine a Light (2019)
	Solomon Walker	2018–2024	bass; backing vocals	Live at the Royal Albert Hall (2023); Live at the Royal Albert Hall 2024 (2024)

== Lineups ==
Period	Members	Live releases
Fall 1981	Bryan Adams – lead vocals, rhythm guitar; Keith Scott – lead guitar, backing vocals; Dave Reimer – bass, backing vocals; John Hannah – keyboards, backing vocals; Jimmy Wesley – drums, backing vocals	none
Late 1981–July 1982	Bryan Adams – lead vocals, rhythm guitar; Keith Scott – lead guitar, backing vocals; Dave Taylor – bass, backing vocals; John Hannah – keyboards, backing vocals; Jimmy Wesley – drums, backing vocals	none
January 1983–March 1984	Bryan Adams – lead vocals, rhythm guitar; Keith Scott – lead guitar, backing vocals; Dave Taylor – bass, backing vocals; John Hannah – keyboards, backing vocals; Frankie La Rocka – drums, backing vocals	none
December 1984–June 1986	Bryan Adams – lead vocals, rhythm guitar; Keith Scott – lead guitar, backing vocals; Dave Taylor – bass, backing vocals; John Hannah – keyboards, backing vocals; Pat Steward – drums, backing vocals	none
May 1987–February 1988	Bryan Adams – lead vocals, rhythm guitar; Keith Scott – lead guitar, backing vocals; Dave Taylor – bass, backing vocals; John Hannah – keyboards, backing vocals; Mickey Curry – drums, backing vocals	none
May 1988–March 1996	Bryan Adams – lead vocals, rhythm guitar; Keith Scott – lead guitar, backing vocals; Dave Taylor – bass, backing vocals; Tommy Mandel – keyboards, backing vocals; Mickey Curry – drums, backing vocals	Live! Live! Live! (1988)
May 1996–1998	Bryan Adams – lead vocals, rhythm guitar; Keith Scott – lead guitar, backing vocals; Dave Taylor – bass, backing vocals; Tommy Mandel – keyboards, backing vocals; Mickey Curry – drums, backing vocals; Danny Cummings – percussion, backing vocals	Unplugged (1997); Wembley 1996 Live (2016)
1998–2002	Bryan Adams – lead vocals, bass; Keith Scott – guitar, backing vocals; Mickey Curry – drums, backing vocals	Live at the Budokan (2000); Live at Slane Castle, Ireland (2001)
2002–March 2016	Bryan Adams – lead vocals, rhythm guitar; Keith Scott – lead guitar, backing vocals; Norm Fisher – bass, backing vocals; Gary Breit – keyboards, backing vocals; Mickey Curry – drums, backing vocals	Live in Lisbon (2005); Bare Bones (2010); Live at Sydney Opera House (2013)
March 2016–December 2017	Bryan Adams – lead vocals, rhythm guitar; Keith Scott – lead guitar, backing vocals; Phil Thornalley – bass, backing vocals; Gary Breit – keyboards, backing vocals; Mickey Curry – drums, backing vocals	none
January 2018–March 2020	Bryan Adams – lead vocals, rhythm guitar; Keith Scott – lead guitar, backing vocals; Solomon Walker – bass, backing vocals; Gary Breit – keyboards, backing vocals; Mickey Curry – drums, backing vocals	none
November 2021–September 2024	Bryan Adams – lead vocals, rhythm guitar; Keith Scott – lead guitar, backing vocals; Solomon Walker – bass, backing vocals; Gary Breit – keyboards, backing vocals; Pat Steward – drums, backing vocals	Live at the Royal Albert Hall (2023); Live at the Royal Albert Hall 2024 (2024)
September 2024–present	Bryan Adams – lead vocals, rhythm guitar, bass; Keith Scott – lead guitar, backing vocals (Note: Luke Doucet filled in for Scott while he recovered from surgery during the Latin American leg of the Roll With the Punches Tour in 2026.); Gary Breit – keyboards, backing vocals; Pat Steward – drums, backing vocals	none
