= Bryan Adams videography =

Bryan Adams video discography
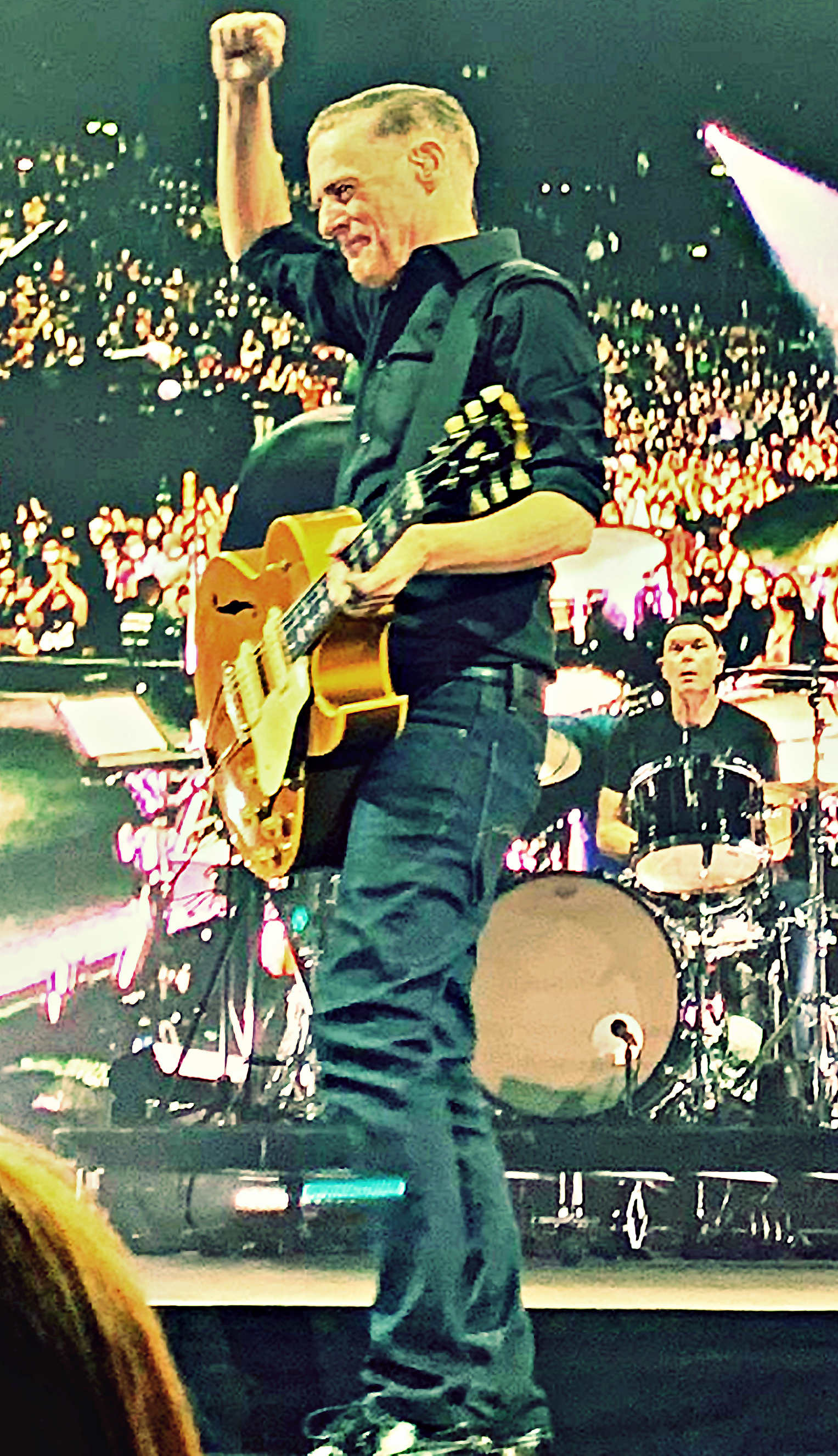
- Video albums: 9
- Music videos: 40

The videography of Canadian rock musician Bryan Adams consists of four video albums and 40 music videos.

== Videos ==
Year	Video details	Certifications
1984	Reckless: Released:, 1984; Label: A&M; Format: VHS	
1992	Waking Up The Neighbours: Released: 1992; Label: A&M; Format: VHS	
1994	So Far So Good (And More): Released: 1994; Label: A&M; Format: VHS	UK: Gold
1997	MTV Unplugged: Released: December 9, 1997; Label: A&M (A&M #540831); Format: VHS, DVD	UK: Gold
2001	Live at Slane Castle, Ireland: Release: December 11, 2001; Label: A&M (A&M #493160); Format: DVD	AUS: Platinum; UK: Gold
2003	Live At The Budokan: Release: June 17, 2003; Label: A&M (A&M #000038100); Format: DVD	
2005	Live in Lisbon: Release: December 2, 2005; Label: A&M (A&M #9875614); Format: DVD	
2013	Live at Sydney Opera House: Release: August 30, 2013; Label: Polydor; Format: DVD, Blu-ray	
2016	Wembley 1996: Release: October 14, 2016; Label: Eagle Rock Entertainment; Format: DVD	

== Music videos ==
Year	Title	Director	Ref.
1980	"Sleepless Nights"	Marcus Nispel	
1980	"Give Me Your Love"		
1980	"Remember"		
1980	"Hidin' From Love"		
1983	"Cuts Like a Knife"	Steve Barron	
1983	"This Time"	Steve Barron	
1984	"Heaven"	Steve Barron	
1984	"Summer of '69"	Steve Barron	
1984	"Somebody"	Steve Barron	
1984	"Kids Wanna Rock"	Steve Barron	
1985	"Run to You"	Steve Barron	
1987	"Heat of the Night"	Wayne Isham	
1987	"Hearts on Fire"		
1987	"Victim of Love"	Dominic Sena	
1991	"(Everything I Do) I Do It for You"	Julien Temple	
1991	"There Will Never Be Another Tonight"	Steve Barron	
1991	"All I Want Is You"	Kevin Godley	
1991	"Can't Stop This Thing We Started"	Kevin Godley	
1992	"Thought I'd Died and Gone to Heaven"	Kevin Godley	
1992	"Do I Have to Say the Words?"	Anton Corbijn	
1993	"All for Love"	David Hogan	
1993	"Please Forgive me"	Andrew Catlin	
1995	"Have You Ever Really Loved a Woman?"	Anton Corbijn	
1996	"Let's Make a Night to Remember"	Matthew Rolston	
1996	"The Only Thing That Looks Good on Me Is You"	Matthew Rolston	
1997	"Back to You"	Milton Lage	
1997	"18 til I Die"	David Mould	
1998	"I'm Ready"	Nigel Dick	
1998	"On a Day Like Today"	Joseph Kahn	
1999	"The Best of Me"	Paul Boyd	
1999	"Inside Out"	Marcus Nispel	
1999	"Cloud Number Nine"	Joe Rey	
2000	"Don't Give Up"	Sven Harding	
2002	"Here I Am"	Mike Lipscombe	
2004	"Open Road"	Tomorrow's Brightest Minds	
2004	"Flying"	Kevin Godley	
2005	"This Side of Paradise"	Dick Caruthers	
2008	"I Thought I'd Seen Everything"	Bryan Adams	
2009	"You've Been a Friend to Me"	Bryan Adams	
2015	"You Belong to Me"	Bryan Adams	
2016	"Brand New Day"	Bryan Adams	
2016	"Do What Ya Gotta Do"	Bryan Adams	
2016	"Don't Even Try"	Bryan Adams	
2017	"Please Stay"	Bryan Adams	
