= Room service (disambiguation) =

Room service is a hotel service.

Room Service may refer to:

== Film ==
- Room Service (1938 film), a Marx Bros. comedy directed by William A. Seiter
- Room Service (1992 film), a comedy directed by Georges Lautner

== Music ==
- Room Service (The Oak Ridge Boys album), 1978
- Room Service (Shaun Cassidy album), 1979
- "Room Service," a 1975 song by Kiss from the album Dressed to Kill
- "Room Service", a 1980 song by Fischer-Z from album Going Deaf for a Living
- Room Service (Roxette album), 2001
- Room Service, a 2003 album by the Danish death-metal group Panzerchrist
- Room Service (Bryan Adams album), 2004
  - "Room Service" (song), a 2005 single by Bryan Adams, from his studio album Room Service
- "Room Service", a 2023 song by Holly Humberstone from the album Paint My Bedroom Black

== Television ==
- Room Service (British TV series), a 1979 comedy series written by Jimmy Perry
- "Room Service" (Frasier), a 1998 episode of the sitcom series Frasier
- Room Service (Canadian TV series), a 2003 home renovation series hosted by Sarah Richardson
- "Room Service" (CSI), a 2005 episode from the sixth season of the crime drama series CSI: Crime Scene Investigation

== Theatre ==
- Room Service (play), a 1937 Broadway play produced by George Abbott
- Room Service (play), a 1997 adaptation of the Boretz/Murray play by The Flying Karamazov Brothers

== See also ==
- "Hotel Room Service", a 2009 song by Pitbull
