= Live in Lisbon =

Video by Bryan Adams
- Released: December 2, 2005
- Venue: Lisbon, Portugal
- Genre: Rock, soft rock
- Label: Universal

Bryan Adams chronology
Live at the Budokan (2003)	Live in Lisbon (2005)

Live in Lisbon is a concert video release by Bryan Adams. It was released in North America only as a limited edition 3rd bonus disc to the 2005 compilation Anthology, was released in the UK as a stand-alone DVD. The stand-alone DVD features extra content such as one extra track When You're Gone sung with a member of the audience, a picture gallery, a radio interview and 3 music videos.

== Track listing ==
No.	Title	Length
1.	"Room Service"	4:29
2.	"Open Road"	4:06
3.	"18 til I Die"	4:01
4.	"Let's Make a Night to Remember"	4:46
5.	"Can't Stop This Thing We Started"	6:00
6.	"Kids Wanna Rock"	5:33
7.	"Back to You"	5:23
8.	"(Everything I Do) I Do It For You"	7:08
9.	"Summer of '69"	5:17
10.	"Cuts Like a Knife"	7:38
11.	"When You're Gone"	4:55
12.	"Not Romeo, Not Juliet"	3:32
13.	"Heaven"	6:17
14.	"It's Only Love"	6:20
15.	"The Only Thing That Looks Good on Me Is You"	5:43
16.	"Cloud #9"	3:49
17.	"Run to You"	5:46
18.	"The Best of Me"	5:59
19.	"Flying"	3:46
20.	"All for Love"	3:41
21.	"Straight from the Heart"	3:57
22.	"Room Service"	4:49

== Certifications ==
Region	Certification	Certified units/sales
Portugal (AFP)	2× Platinum	16,000^{^}
^{^} Shipments figures based on certification alone.
