= Get Up (Bryan Adams album) =

Studio album by Bryan Adams
- Released: October 2, 2015
- Recorded: 2013–2015
- Genre: Rock
- Length: 36:03
- Label: Polydor
- Producer: Jeff Lynne; Bryan Adams

Bryan Adams chronology
Tracks of My Years (2014)	Get Up (2015)	Ultimate (2017)

Singles from Get Up
- 1. "Brand New Day" Released: September 7, 2015; 2. "You Belong to Me" Released: December 7, 2015; 3. "Do What Ya Gotta Do" Released: February 17, 2016; 4. "Don't Even Try" Released: July 5, 2016

Professional ratings
Review scores
Source	Rating
Cryptic Rock	5/5 stars
Rolling Stone Australia	2.5/5 stars
The Yorkshire Times	4/5 stars

Get Up is the thirteenth studio album by Canadian singer-songwriter Bryan Adams, released physically in Australia and New Zealand on October 2 and worldwide on October 16, 2015, by Universal Music. Produced by ELO frontman Jeff Lynne and co-written with his long-time collaborator Jim Vallance, the album features nine new songs and four acoustic versions (total 13 tracks). The first single released was "You Belong to Me" featuring a music video. It was shot and directed by Adams using his black and white photography style, with only his guitar and "a muse" to assist him.

== Background ==
Universal announced the release of the album on August 10, 2015. "You Belong to Me" was released digitally on the same date as an "instant-grat track". Get Up is Bryan Adams' first studio album consisting of only original material since 11 (2008), following the release of covers album, Tracks of My Years (which contained one original song) in 2014. Adams has said of the album, "It came together quite organically, song by song, working with Jeff producing over the past couple of years whenever he had time. It was a great partnership as it gave me plenty of time to write the songs, most of which are a collaboration with Jim Vallance. We all worked primarily over the internet from Canada, Europe and LA, sending demos and parts of songs until we got it right." Of working with Jeff Lynne, Adams said: "He sort of becomes a member of the band. In this case, on the majority of the tracks he produced on this album, he is the band."

== Singles ==
The album's lead single, "Brand New Day" was then released on September 7, 2015. Bryan Adams has said of the song: "That was the last song written for the record, and it’s about getting motivated, about getting up and do something with yourself. But it’s also about the idea that the grass is always greener on the other side. Or is it?" The music video, directed by Adams, features British actress Helena Bonham Carter and Theo Hutchcraft.

"You Belong to Me" was released as the album's second single in November 2015 along with the music video, directed by Adams with Katerina Smutok as a dancer, the song was added to BBC Radio 2's playlist during November and December 2015.

The third single "Do What Ya Gotta Do" debuted on the radio in February 2016 along with the music video, directed by Adams, on February 17, 2016.

"Don't Even Try" was released as the album's fourth single on July 5, 2016, along with the music video, directed by Adams, premiering the same day. This video features British comedian David Walliams as the unruly guitarist in the band.

== Track listing ==
All tracks are written by Bryan Adams and Jim Vallance, except where noted.

No.	Title	Writer(s)	Length
1.	"You Belong to Me"		2:29
2.	"Go Down Rockin'"		2:58
3.	"We Did It All"		3:25
4.	"That's Rock and Roll"	Adams, Vallance, Phil Thornalley	2:48
5.	"Don't Even Try"		2:25
6.	"Do What Ya Gotta Do"	Adams, Jeff Lynne	2:14
7.	"Thunderbolt"		2:15
8.	"Yesterday Was Just a Dream"		2:57
9.	"Brand New Day"		3:33
10.	"Don't Even Try" (acoustic version)		2:28
11.	"We Did It All" (acoustic version)		2:56
12.	"You Belong to Me" (acoustic version)		2:31
13.	"Brand New Day" (acoustic version)		3:04
Total length:			36:03

iTunes bonus track
No.	Title	Length
14.	"Interview"	12:33

== Personnel ==
Personnel taken from Get Up liner notes.

- Bryan Adams – vocals, guitars
- Jeff Lynne – guitar, piano, bass, drums, backing vocals
- Jim Vallance – slide guitar, guitar, backing vocals, cowbell
- Steve Jay – shaker, tambourine
- Phil Thornalley – guitar solo, riffs, and backing vocals on "That's Rock and Roll"
- Keith Scott – guitar riffs on "Go Down Rockin'"
- Rusty Anderson – guitar riffs on "Go Down Rockin'"

Technical personnel

- Jeff Lynne – production (1–9)
- Bryan Adams – production (10–13), additional recording, photography
- Steve Jay – engineering (1–9), mixing (10–13)
- Jim Vallance – additional recording
- Bob Ludwig – mastering
- Nuno Fernandes – recording (10–13)
- Dirk Rudolph – design

== Charts ==
=== Weekly charts ===
Chart (2015)	Peak position
Australian Albums (ARIA)	6
Austrian Albums (Ö3 Austria)	4
Belgian Albums (Ultratop Flanders)	10
Belgian Albums (Ultratop Wallonia)	30
Canadian Albums (Billboard)	8
Danish Albums (Hitlisten)	22
Dutch Albums (Album Top 100)	13
French Albums (SNEP)	187
German Albums (Offizielle Top 100)	3
Irish Albums (IRMA)	20
Italian Albums (FIMI)	30
Norwegian Albums (VG-lista)	10
Portuguese Albums (AFP)	8
Scottish Albums (OCC)	2
Spanish Albums (PROMUSICAE)	24
Swedish Albums (Sverigetopplistan)	9
Swiss Albums (Schweizer Hitparade)	1
UK Albums (OCC)	2
US Billboard 200	99

=== Year-end charts ===
Chart (2015)	Position
Swiss Albums (Schweizer Hitparade)	88

== Certifications ==
Region	Certification	Certified units/sales
United Kingdom (BPI)	Silver	60,000^{‡}
^{‡} Sales+streaming figures based on certification alone.
