= Room Service (Bryan Adams album) =

Studio album by Bryan Adams
- Released: September 10, 2004
- Recorded: September 29, 2003 – June 4, 2004
- Genre: Rock
- Length: 39:14
- Labels: Polydor; Mercury (US)
- Producer: Bryan Adams

Bryan Adams chronology
Live at the Budokan (2003)	Room Service (2004)	Colour Me Kubrick (2005)

Singles from Room Service
- 1. "Open Road" Released: September 13, 2004; 2. "Flying" Released: November 29, 2004; 3. "Room Service" Released: March 28, 2005; 4. "This Side of Paradise" Released: 2005; 5. "Why Do You Have to Be So Hard to Love?" Released: 2005

Room Service is the tenth studio album by Canadian singer-songwriter Bryan Adams. The album was released by Polydor Records on September 10, 2004. Room Service was the first release of new Adams material since the soundtrack album Spirit: Stallion of the Cimarron in 2002 and the first studio album in six years since On a Day Like Today. Adams produced the album and co-wrote the songs with various co-writers, the themes of the songs being varied between street life, touring, truth, love and relationships.

Room Service was a success entering the charts in more than 15 countries, peaking at number one in Germany and Switzerland and top ten in seven other territories. The album didn't fare as well in the United States, as Adams had no record company or publicity.

Five songs were released from the album in various forms and at various times: "Open Road", "Flying", "Room Service", "This Side of Paradise" and "Why Do You Have to Be So Hard to Love?"; the first three were released as physical singles internationally and the last two as radio-airplay singles. The album's first single charted within the top twenty on the Canadian Singles Chart, the second within the top forties in Canada and the top hundred in Europe; "Room Service" was less commercially successful. The album was nominated for two Juno Awards, for "CD/DVD Artwork Design of the Year" and "Artist of the Year".

== Recording and writing ==
Adams first started working on the album in 2001, but switched his focus on the soundtrack album, Spirit: Stallion of the Cimarron which was scheduled for release in 2002. Adams had started working on the album in The Warehouse Studio, Canada, but he ran out of time because he was about to headline a tour in Europe. He, together with his associates, created a system and decided to do small overdubs while on tour, to see how it worked out. The idea of recording while on tour was mainly due to boredom on Adams' part. With his earlier releases Adams used, in his own words, to "go kind of nuts, a bit stir crazy", so he began using his spare time on tour to write and record new songs. "I tried to make use of the time which is generally spent doing nothing," Adams said. He was able to gather enough equipment into a couple of suitcases to create a small studio for himself. They'd normally order a couple of rooms, order room service, and then begin the recording season. Adams believed it to be a better working environment, even when he and the crew moved the gear many times during a season, and they would normally get help from the local staff.

Regarding "East Side Story", the opening track, when asked why he picked New York for the song, Adams replied, "Probably because there is so much street activity there, even though there is an east side to every city, the NY east side, or lower east side, is particularly full of character. It just seemed to paint the picture." The second track, "This Side of Paradise", is about finding the truth; Adams said that many American radio stations refused to play the song because of the line "There ain't no Santa Claus". The first single, "Open Road", was completed over two continents while Adams was touring. "The basic track was recorded in Vancouver, at the Warehouse studio," Adams notes, but the vocals were done in Paris, France and guitarist Keith Scott started working on the song backstage in Lethbridge, Alberta. The music video for the song is not so much about traffic as it is about "power, authority [...] and anti-establishment" statements. The album's title track deals "with the idea that touring can be very lonely". When writing the song, Adams wanted to make the "peephole in the hotel door" so people could know what he was doing, while acknowledging that isn't always like that, "but you do end up really missing the things you have at home".

== Critical response ==
Professional ratings
Review scores
Source	Rating
AllMusic	2/5 stars
BBC	(mixed)
Entertainment Weekly	C−
Rolling Stone	2.5/5 stars
Uncut	2/10 stars
USA Today	2.5/4 stars

Reviews were generally lukewarm to poor. Elysa Gardner of USA Today gave the album two-and-a-half stars out of four, noted how many of the songs were similar to much of Adams' previous work, calling the songs "solid, digestible meat-and-potatoes rockers delivered in the '80s pop icon's immediately familiar rasp."

BBC reviewer Michelle Adamson gave the album a mixed review, claimed the album had a reasonable beginning but quickly descended to its low point on track four, "Flying". However, she liked the nearly "cliché-free lyrics" of "I Was Only Dreamin’" which offered a little variety from the normal Adams treat. Adamson wrote in her conclusion that she felt there was too little to win over new fans, while acknowledging it would sink well in with old ones. David Wild of Rolling Stone gave it two-and-a-half stars out of five and noted, "Adams' approach on Room Service sounds more hip in theory than in practice – apparently he recorded the album in assorted hotel rooms and backstage areas while touring in Europe (where he remains in greater demand). The result: a disc that sounds less like Jackson Browne's Running on Empty (which was recorded in a similar fashion) than a very ordinary Bryan Adams album. [...] For the faithful, at least, Room Service still delivers."

Stephen Thomas Erlewine from AllMusic gave the record two out of five stars, saying the album "evaporated" after listening to it, as no songs were memorable, and because Adams was playing it "safe" with this record, no songs were bad nor good, just "pleasant and professional". He did, however, conclude that long-time Adams fans would enjoy it but also ask the question "why he even bothers to record new albums if he doesn't have anything new to say?" British music magazine Uncut gave it a rating of 2 out of 10—although while noting the album's "inherently conservative nature", ending the review with, "Room Service is still a better record than you might imagine." Entertainment Weekly gave the album a C−, writing that Adams was still releasing material which "cuts like a butter knife", a reference to his earlier single, "Cuts Like a Knife" from 1983. Nancy Miller, the reviewer, considered "Not Romeo, Not Juliet" to be "hokey" and "Nowhere Fast" as a "bland power ballad".

== Chart and commercial performance ==
Internationally, Room Service was a commercial success, debuted at number one on the European Albums Chart and sold over 1 million copies. The album went to number one in Germany and Switzerland and charted within the top ten in Austria, Belgium, Netherlands and Portugal, also reaching the top twenty in Australia, Denmark, Spain and Sweden. The album was certified gold in Germany and Switzerland, thanks to sales of over 100,000 and 15,000 units respectively.

In the United Kingdom the album debuted at its peak position, number four and was certified silver for sales of over 60,000 units on September 24 by the British Phonographic Industry, just four days after its release in the UK. At the 2005 Juno Awards, Adams was nominated for "Artist of the Year" and the album was nominated in the category "CD/DVD Artwork Design of the Year".

This was Adams first original studio album to be released since On a Day Like Today in 1998, due to his soundtrack work with Hans Zimmer. In the US, it was released in the Spring of 2005 and achieved sales of 44,000 units due to an arrangement with Walmart, but Adams had no record label at the time, hence the album debuted and peaked at number hundred-and-thirty-four on the Billboard 200 on the charts issue date of May 28, 2005. and became his lowest charting album in the United States, and his second album to peak within the top two hundreds, the first being You Want It You Got It in 1982.

In neighboring Canada however, the album peaked at number two on October 9, 2004 and was certified platinum by the Canadian Recording Industry Association (CRIA).

== Room Service Tour ==
The resulting tour was a success, with almost every concert being sold out. The Room Service Tour continued from 2004 through 2006. Adams toured all round the world playing in countries such as India, Pakistan, and Vietnam. In 2006, Adams became the first Western artist to perform in Pakistan, at Karachi.

== Track listings ==
US Version Does not have the bonus track and Room Service is replaced by the single version of the song clocking at 3:06

All tracks are written by Bryan Adams. Additional writers listed below.

No.	Title	Writer(s)	Length
1.	"East Side Story"	Peters, Bracegirdle	3:22
2.	"This Side of Paradise"	Peters	3:50
3.	"Not Romeo Not Juliet"	Thornalley, Munday	3:37
4.	"Flying"	Lange	4:04
5.	"She's a Little Too Good for Me"	Peters	2:37
6.	"Open Road"	Kennedy	3:28
7.	"Room Service"	Kennedy	2:53
8.	"I Was Only Dreamin'"	Peters	2:30
9.	"Right Back Where I Started From"	Kennedy	3:41
10.	"Nowhere Fast"	Peters, Elofsson	3:48
11.	"Why Do You Have to Be So Hard to Love?"	Peters	2:58
12.	"Blessing in Disguise (UK/Japan Bonus Track and B-side of single)"	Peters	2:25

== Personnel ==
- Bryan Adams – vocals, guitar, Dobro, harmonica, piano, bass
- Keith Scott – guitars
- Mickey Curry – drums

Additional musicians

- Norm Fisher – bass
- Gary Breit – piano and organ
- Phil Thornalley – additional production, guitars and keyboards
- Yoad Nevo – additional production, programming, percussion, guitars
- Declan Masterson – Irish whistle on "Flying"
- Maurice Seezer – accordion and piano on "Flying"
- Gavin Greenway – string arrangement on "Flying"
- Michael Kamen – string arrangement and oboe on "I Was Only Dreaming"
- The Pointless Brothers – background vocals on "Flying"

Technical personnel

- Ben Dobie, Avril Mackintosh, and Olle Romo – Pro Tools editing
- Bob Clearmountain – mixing
- Ben Dobie – engineering
- Kirk McNally – engineering

== Charts ==
=== Weekly charts ===
Weekly chart performance for Room Service
Chart (2004)	Peak position
Australian Albums (ARIA)	15
Austrian Albums (Ö3 Austria)	3
Belgian Albums (Ultratop Flanders)	5
Belgian Albums (Ultratop Wallonia)	43
Canadian Albums (Billboard)	2
Danish Albums (Hitlisten)	11
Dutch Albums (Album Top 100)	3
European Top 100 Albums (Billboard)	1
Finnish Albums (Suomen virallinen lista)	34
French Albums (SNEP)	200
German Albums (Offizielle Top 100)	1
Irish Albums (IRMA)	28
Norwegian Albums (VG-lista)	18
Polish Albums (ZPAV)	28
Portuguese Albums (AFP)	5
Scottish Albums (Official Charts)	7
South African Albums (RISA)	6
Spanish Albums (Promusicae)	72
Swedish Albums (Sverigetopplistan)	19
Swiss Albums (Schweizer Hitparade)	1
UK Albums (Official Charts)	4
US Billboard 200	134

=== Year-end charts ===
Year-end chart performance for Room Service
Chart (2004)	Position
German Albums (Offizielle Top 100)	71
Swiss Albums (Schweizer Hitparade)	29

== Certifications ==
Region	Certification	Certified units/sales
Canada (Music Canada)	Platinum	100,000^{^}
Germany (BVMI)	Gold	100,000^{^}
Portugal (AFP)	Silver	10,000^{^}
Switzerland (IFPI Switzerland)	Gold	20,000^{^}
United Kingdom (BPI)	Gold	100,000^{^}
^{^} Shipments figures based on certification alone.
