= Bare Bones (Bryan Adams album) =

Live album by Bryan Adams
- Released: 16 November 2010
- Recorded: 27 May – 16 June 2010 at various locations
- Genre: Rock
- Length: 74:09
- Label: Decca Records
- Producer: Bryan Adams

Bryan Adams chronology
Live in Lisbon (2005)	Bare Bones (2010)	Live At Sydney Opera House (2013)

Professional ratings
Review scores
Source	Rating
AllMusic	4/5 stars
Mojo	3/5 stars
Q	2/5 stars

Bare Bones is a 2010 acoustic live album by Canadian rock singer Bryan Adams. The album was re released in 2025, but without the track 'Please Forgive Me'.

== Track listing ==
No.	Title	Writer(s)	Recorded at	Length
1.	"You've Been a Friend to Me"	Bryan Adams, Gretchen Peters	Capitol Center for the Arts, 9 June 2010, Concord	3:16
2.	"Here I Am"	Adams, Peters, Hans Zimmer	Anderson Center for the Performing Arts, 14 June 2010, Binghamton	3:47
3.	"I'm Ready"	Adams, Jim Vallance	Anderson Center for the Performing Arts, 14 June 2010, Binghamton	4:02
4.	"Let's Make a Night to Remember"	Adams, Robert John "Mutt" Lange	Maine Center for the Arts, 10 June 2010, Orono	3:47
5.	"It Ain't a Party (If You Can't Come 'Round)"	Adams, Lange	Weinberg Center for the Arts, 15 June 2010, Frederick	3:10
6.	"(Everything I Do) I Do It for You"	Adams, Lange, Michael Kamen	Sentrum Scene, 27 May 2010, Oslo	5:21
7.	"Cuts Like a Knife"	Adams, Vallance	Anderson Center for the Performing Arts, 14 June 2010, Binghamton	4:43
8.	"Please Forgive Me"	Adams, Lange	Anderson Center for the Performing Arts, 14 June 2010, Binghamton	3:48
9.	"Summer of '69"	Adams, Vallance	Weinberg Center, 15 June 2010, Frederick	4:12
10.	"Walk on By"	Adams, Vallance	Anderson Center for the Performing Arts, 14 June 2010, Binghamton	2:44
11.	"Cloud Number Nine"	Adams, Peters, Max Martin	Sentrum Scene, 27 May 2010, Oslo	3:48
12.	"It's Only Love"	Adams, Vallance	Weinberg Center, 15 June 2010, Frederick	3:33
13.	"Heaven"	Adams, Vallance	Anderson Center for the Performing Arts, 14 June 2010, Binghamton	4:12
14.	"The Right Place"	Adams, Vallance	Anderson Center for the Performing Arts, 14 June 2010, Binghamton	2:54
15.	"The Way You Make Me Feel"	Adams, Phil Thornalley	Sentrum Scene, 27 May 2010, Oslo	3:08
16.	"The Only Thing That Looks Good on Me Is You"	Adams, Lange	Sentrum Scene, 27 May 2010, Oslo	2:50
17.	"You're Still Beautiful to Me"	Adams, Lange	Anderson Center for the Performing Arts, 14 June 2010, Binghamton	4:12
18.	"Straight from the Heart"	Adams, Eric Kagna	Veterans Memorial Auditorium, 11 June 2010, Providence	3:24
19.	"I Still Miss You... A Little Bit"	Adams, Vallance	Weinberg Center, 15 June 2010, Frederick	3:30
20.	"All for Love"	Adams, Lange, Kamen	Community Arts Center, 16 June 2010, Williamsport	3:16

== Personnel ==
- Bryan Adams – acoustic guitar, harmonica, vocals
- Gary Breit – piano

Technical personnel

- Ben Dobie – recording
- Bob Clearmountain – mixing
- Jody Perpick – sound

== Certifications ==
Region	Certification	Certified units/sales
Canada (Music Canada)	Gold	40,000^{^}
Portugal (AFP)	Platinum	20,000^{^}
^{^} Shipments figures based on certification alone.
