= Wembley 1996 Live =

2016 live concert video by Bryan Adams

Video by Bryan Adams
- Released: October 14th, 2016
- Recorded: July 27, 1996
- Venue: Wembley Stadium, Wembley, London, England
- Genre: Rock
- Length: 108 minutes
- Label: Eagle Rock Entertainment

Bryan Adams chronology
Live at Sydney Opera House (2013)	Wembley 1996 Live (2016)

Wembley 1996 Live is a live concert video from the Canadian rocker Bryan Adams. It was his first concert video and was shot at Wembley Stadium on 27 July 1996, performing to a sold-out over 70,000 people, is released by Eagle Rock Entertainment on October 14, 2016.

The video album peaked at number one in its category in the UK.

== Track listing ==
1. "The Only Thing That Looks Good on Me Is You" (Adams, Lange)
2. "Do to You" (Adams, Lange)
3. "Kids Wanna Rock" (Adams, Vallance)
4. "Can't Stop This Thing We Started" (Adams, Lange)
5. "This Time" (Adams, Vallance)
6. "18 til I Die (Adams, Lange)
7. "Have You Ever Really Loved a Woman?" (Adams, Lange, Kamen)
8. "Touch the Hand" (Adams, Lange)
9. "Cuts Like a Knife" (Adams, Vallance)
10. "It's Only Love (duet with Melissa Etheridge) (Adams, Vallance)
11. "Somebody" (Adams, Vallance)
12. "(Everything I Do) I Do It for You" (Adams, Lange, Kamen)
13. "Run to You" (Adams, Vallance)
14. "There Will Never Be Another Tonight" (Adams, Lange, Vallance)
15. "Seven Nights to Rock" (Henry Glover, Louis Innis, Buck Trail)
16. "(I Wanna Be) Your Underwear" (Adams, Lange)
17. "Wild Thing" (Chip Taylor)
18. "It Ain't a Party... If You Can't Come 'Round" (Adams, Lange)
19. "She's Only Happy When She's Dancin" (Adams, Vallance)
20. "Summer of '69" (Adams, Vallance)
21. "All for Love (Adams, Lange, Kamen)
22. "Let's Make a Night to Remember" (Adams, Lange)
23. "I Fought the Law" (Sonny Curtis)
24. "Heaven" (Adams, Vallance)

== Charts ==
Chart (2016)	Peak position
Australian Music DVDs Chart (ARIA Charts)	32
Austrian Music DVDs Chart (Ö3 Austria)	9
Belgian Music DVD (Ultratop Flanders)	5
Belgian Music DVD (Ultratop Wallonia)	5
Dutch Music DVDs Chart (MegaCharts)	11
Finnish Music DVDs Chart (Musiikkituottajat)	9
German Albums Chart (Offizielle Top 100)	7
Spanish Music DVD (PROMUSICAE)	3
UK Music Videos (OCC)	1

== Bryan Adams: Wembley 1996 Live ==
Wembley Live 1996

Live album by Bryan Adams
- Released: June 30th, 2017 (CD, LP record) (International)
- Recorded: July 27, 1996
- Venue: Wembley Stadium
- Genre: Rock
- Length: 128:02

Bryan Adams chronology
Live at Sydney Opera House (2013)	Wembley Live 1996 (2017)

A fully restored film edition of the Wembley Stadium performance was released in 2016, with CD and vinyl editions.

== Track listing CD Album ==
=== Disc one ===
1. "The Only Thing That Looks Good on Me Is You"
2. "Do to You"
3. "Kids Wanna Rock"
4. "Can't Stop This Thing We Started"
5. "This Time"
6. "18 til I Die
7. "Have You Ever Really Loved a Woman?"
8. "Touch the Hand"
9. "Cuts Like a Knife"
10. "It's Only Love (feat. Melissa Etheridge)
11. "Somebody"
12. "(Everything I Do) I Do It for You"

=== Disc two ===
1. "Run to You"
2. "There Will Never Be Another Tonight"
3. "Seven Nights to Rock"
4. "(I Wanna Be) Your Underwear"
5. "Wild Thing"
6. "It Ain't a Party... If You Can't Come 'Round"
7. "She's Only Happy When She's Dancin"
8. "Summer of '69"
9. "All for Love"
10. "Let's Make a Night to Remember"
11. "I Fought the Law"
12. "Heaven"

== Track listing Triple Vinyl Album ==
=== Disc A ===
1. "The Only Thing That Looks Good on Me Is You"
2. "Do to You"
3. "Kids Wanna Rock"
4. "Can't Stop This Thing We Started"
5. "This Time"
6. "18 til I Die
7. "Have You Ever Really Loved a Woman?"
8. "Touch the Hand"
9. "Cuts Like a Knife"

=== Disc B ===
1. "It's Only Love (feat. Melissa Etheridge)
2. "Somebody"
3. "(Everything I Do) I Do It for You"
4. "Run to You"
5. "There Will Never Be Another Tonight"
6. "Seven Nights to Rock"
7. "(I Wanna Be) Your Underwear"
8. "Wild Thing"
9. "It Ain't a Party... If You Can't Come 'Round"

=== Disc C ===
1. "She's Only Happy When She's Dancin"
2. "Summer of '69"
3. "All for Love"
4. "Let's Make a Night to Remember"
5. "I Fought the Law"
6. "Heaven"

== Personnel ==
- Bryan Adams – vocals, guitars, harmonica, directed, photography
- Keith Scott – guitars, backing vocals
- Mickey Curry – drums, backing vocals
- Tommy Mandel – keyboards, piano, backing vocals
- Dave Taylor – bass guitars, backing vocals
- Danny Cummings – percussion, backing vocals
- Melissa Etheridge – vocals in "It's Only Love"

Technical personnel

- Bob Clearmountain – engineer, mixed
- Geoff Kempin – executive-producer
- Terry Shand – executive-producer
- Bruce Allen – producer, product manager
- Büro Dirk Rodolph – artwork
- Andrew Catlin – photography
