= Patrick Park =

American singer-songwriter

- Born: January 1, 1977 (age 49)
- Origin: Morrison, Colorado, U.S.
- Genres: Acoustic, Folk rock
- Occupation: Singer-songwriter
- Instrument: Guitar
- Label: Curb Appeal Records
- Website: patrickpark.net

Patrick Park (born January 1, 1977) is an American singer-songwriter and guitarist.

== Biography ==
Park grew up in Morrison, Colorado and currently lives in Los Angeles, CA. He was exposed to the arts at an early age: his mother was a published poet, and his father was a doctor who enjoyed playing folk and blues records and the guitar at home. Park himself began to write songs in his early teens and played in bands starting in middle school.

He moved to New York City to try and start a music career, but left after less than eight months for Los Angeles, working numerous odd jobs that ranged from clothing store retail clerk to karate teacher to support himself.

In 2000, Park completed his first demo collection, now known as The Basement Tapes. He recorded the songs in the back of a store owned by a friend's girlfriend since he did not have enough money to use a studio.

=== Career ===
Park befriended producer Dave Trumfio (Wilco, Earlimart) later that year. He and Trumfio wrote, recorded, and mixed material for Park's debut album during the summer months of 2002 and has since worked very closely with him on various EPs and LPs.

He signed a deal with Hollywood Records in 2003, and while recording for the major label, Badman Recording Co. released Park's first offering, the six song EP: Under the Unminding Skies. Park's first studio album, Loneliness Knows My Name, followed in 2004. Disappointed by low sales, he later commented: "[Hollywood Records] had no idea what to do with me. They're a pop label, so they were always trying to fit a square peg in a round hole." He moved to Curb Appeal Records and released his second full-length album, Everyone's in Everyone and his EP Songs of Peace – Songs of Protest, while continuing to tour across the U.S. For his third full-length album Come What Will (2010), Park moved back to Badman Recording which released his EP Under the Unminding Skies in 2003. In 2013 Park released his EP " We Fall Out of Touch" through rsrch + dvlp. following with his full length " Love Like Swords" in 2014 via Cobraside.

Park received moderate attention following airplay for "Life Is a Song", which was chosen as the final song on the series finale of the Fox teen drama The O.C..

Patrick Park opened for Grammy Award winning artist Shelby Lynne at a one night only charity event to benefit Alzheimer's research on September 1, 2011, at the Yost Theater in Santa Ana.

== Discography ==
- Basement Tapes EP (2000)
- Under the Unminding Skies EP (2003)
- Rarities EP (2003)
- Patrick Park EP (2003)
- Loneliness Knows My Name (2003)
- Monday Nights at Spaceland Live LP (2006)
- Everyone's in Everyone (2007)
- StickBirdSongs EP (2007)
- Songs of Peace – Songs of Protest EP (2007)
- Come What Will (2010)
- We Fall out of Touch EP (2013)
- Love Like Swords (2014)
- Here/Gone (2019)
