= Here I Am (Bryan Adams song) =

2002 single by Bryan Adams

Single by Bryan Adams

from the album Spirit: Stallion of the Cimarron
- Released: June 24, 2002
- Length: 4:52
- Label: A&M
- Songwriters: Bryan Adams; Hans Zimmer; Gretchen Peters
- Producer: Jimmy Jam and Terry Lewis for Flyte Tyme Productions

Bryan Adams singles chronology
"Don't Give Up" (2000)	"Here I Am" (2002)	"Open Road" (2004)

"Here I Am" is a song co-written and recorded by Canadian singer Bryan Adams. The song was written and recorded in 2002 for the movie Spirit: Stallion of the Cimarron and was both released on the official soundtrack and as a single. "Here I Am" reached number one in the Czech Republic and Portugal, number five in the United Kingdom and on the US Billboard Adult Contemporary chart, and the top 20 in at least 10 other European countries. The song won an ASCAP Award and was nominated for Golden Globe Award for Best Original Song. Adams also recorded the song in French, called "Me voilà".

== Music video ==
A screenshot of the music video. As of 2026, it's not available on any official platform.

The music video for "Here I Am" was directed by Mike Lipscombe and produced by Michael J. Pierce and premiered on May 21, 2002. It is set in the American Southwest, featuring Adams and several women living in the wilderness trying to survive from thirst, snakes, etc. They are all portrayed as giants roaming on the landscape. As a reference to the movie Spirit: Stallion of the Cimarron, a herd of horses is shown running through a desert.

Bryan Adams' performance and the actor performances were filmed in a green screen studio in Hollywood, California. The background for the video was filmed in Monument Valley, Utah, from a helicopter. The sequences with the horses were filmed at ranch in Santa Clarita, California, against a large green screen so that the action of the horses could be manipulated in post-production. The total production period was six days, an extremely aggressive turnaround for a project that was all green screen and visual effects. This was necessary to premier the music video at the Hollywood screening of the film Spirit: Stallion of the Cimarron.

The music video was uploaded to YouTube on October 30, 2008, amassing 86 million views before being pulled. As of August 2026, the official music video for this song is not available on any official platform.

== Track listing ==
Maxi-CD

1. "Here I Am" (End Title) – 4:46
2. "You Can't Take Me" (alternate version) – 3:52
3. "Cloud Number Nine" (recorded in Live at Slane Castle, Ireland, August 26, 2000) – 4:06
4. "Here I Am" (instrumental) – 4:05

Double CD set version

1. "Here I Am (Soundtrack version)
2. "Cloud Number 9 (Live From Slane Castle version)
3. "I'm Ready (Live At Slane Castle version)
4. "Here I Am ((End Title) Fade End)
5. "Here I Am (Instrumental version)
6. "You Can't Take Me (Alternate version)
7. "Here I Am (Video version)

== Personnel ==
- Bryan Adams – vocals, acoustic and electric guitar
- Mickey Curry – acoustic drum fills
- Jimmy Jam and Terry Lewis – keyboards, synths, drum programming
- Keith Scott – guitars
- Steve Hodge, Kevin Globerman – engineers

== Charts ==
=== Weekly charts ===
Chart (2002)	Peak position
Australia (ARIA)	86
Austria (Ö3 Austria Top 40)	12
Belgium (Ultratop 50 Flanders)	14
Belgium (Ultratip Bubbling Under Wallonia)	2
Canada Radio (Nielsen BDS)	7
Canada AC (Nielsen BDS)	2
Czech Republic (IFPI)	1
Denmark (Tracklisten)	15
Europe (Eurochart Hot 100)	17
Germany (GfK)	17
Hungary (Rádiós Top 40)	11
Hungary (Single Top 40)	19
Ireland (IRMA)	15
Netherlands (Dutch Top 40)	29
Netherlands (Single Top 100)	30
New Zealand (Recorded Music NZ)	48
Poland Airplay (Music & Media)	2
Portugal (AFP)	1
Romania (Romanian Top 100)	7
Scottish Singles Sales (Official Charts)	5
Sweden (Sverigetopplistan)	15
Switzerland (Schweizer Hitparade)	24
UK Singles (Official Charts)	5
US Bubbling Under Hot 100 (Billboard)	23
US Adult Contemporary (Billboard)	5

=== Year-end charts ===
Chart (2002)	Position
Belgium (Ultratop 50 Flanders)	43
Canada Radio (Nielsen BDS)	87
Germany (Media Control)	75
Switzerland (Schweizer Hitparade)	76
UK Singles (OCC)	131
US Adult Contemporary (Billboard)	15

== Release history ==
Region	Date	Format(s)	Label(s)	Ref.
Australia	June 24, 2002	CD	A&M	
United Kingdom	July 8, 2002	CD; cassette	A&M	
