= Live at Sydney Opera House =

Live album by Bryan Adams
- Released: August 30, 2013
- Recorded: September 18, 2011
- Venue: Sydney Opera House
- Genre: Rock
- Label: Polydor

Bryan Adams chronology
Bare Bones (2010)	Live at Sydney Opera House (2013)	Tracks of My Years (2014)

Bryan Adams. The Bare Bones Tour. Live at Sydney Opera House is a live album and DVD/Blu-ray by Canadian musician Bryan Adams. The album was recorded live at the Sydney Opera House.

It is available as a CD/DVD set, or separately as a CD, DVD or Blu-ray.

== Track listing ==
=== CD ===
No.	Title	Writer(s)	Length
1.	"Run to You"	Bryan Adams, Jim Vallance	3:17
2.	"Back to You"	Adams, Eliot Kennedy	3:30
3.	"Here I Am"	Adams, Hans Zimmer, Gretchen Peters	3:49
4.	"I'm Ready"	Adams, Vallance	3:50
5.	"This Time"	Adams, Vallance	2:39
6.	"Flying"	Adams, Robert John "Mutt" Lange	3:14
7.	"Can't Stop This Thing We Started"	Adams, Lange	3:16
8.	"Waiting On The '49"	Adams, Vallance	3:26
9.	"Heat of the Night"	Adams, Vallance	4:01
10.	"(Everything I Do) I Do It for You"	Adams, Lange, Michael Kamen	3:56
11.	"Cuts Like a Knife"	Adams, Vallance	4:33
12.	"Tonight in Babylon"	Adams, Peters	3:01
13.	"Summer of '69"	Adams, Vallance	3:38
14.	"Walk On By"	Adams, Vallance	2:56
15.	"Heaven"	Adams, Vallance	4:53
16.	"The Right Place"	Adams, Vallance	2:49
17.	"The Only Thing That Looks Good on Me Is You"	Adams, Lange	2:36
18.	"You've Been a Friend to Me"	Adams, Peters	3:08
19.	"When You're Gone"	Adams, Kennedy	2:48
20.	"Have You Ever Really Loved a Woman?"	Adams, Lange, Kamen	4:50
21.	"I Still Miss You... A Little Bit"	Adams, Vallance	3:09
22.	"Straight from the Heart"	Adams, Eric Kagna	3:30

=== DVD/Blu-ray ===
No.	Title	Writer(s)	Length
1.	"Intro"
2.	"Run to You"	Adams, Vallance
3.	"Back to You"	Adams, Kennedy
4.	"Here I Am"	Adams, Zimmer, Peters
5.	"I'm Ready"	Adams, Vallance
6.	"This Time"	Adams, Vallance
7.	"Flying"	Adams, Lange
8.	"Let's Make a Night to Remember"	Adams, Lange
9.	"Can't Stop This Thing We Started"	Adams, Lange
10.	"Waiting on the '49"	Adams, Vallance
11.	"Heat of the Night"	Adams, Vallance
12.	"(Everything I Do) I Do It for You"	Adams, Lange, Kamen
13.	"Cuts Like a Knife"	Adams, Vallance
14.	"Please Forgive Me"	Adams, Lange
15.	"Tonight In Babylon"	Adams, Peters
16.	"Summer of '69"	Adams, Vallance
17.	"Walk On By"	Adams, Vallance
18.	"Heaven"	Adams, Vallance
19.	"The Right Place"	Adams, Vallance
20.	"The Only Thing That Looks Good on Me Is You"	Adams, Lange
21.	"Somebody"	Adams, Vallance
22.	"You've Been a Friend to Me"	Adams, Peters
23.	"When You're Gone"	Adams, Kennedy
24.	"Have You Ever Really Loved a Woman?"	Adams, Lange, Kamen
25.	"I Still Miss You... A Little Bit"	Adams, Vallance
26.	"Straight from the Heart"	Adams, Eric Kagna

== Certifications ==
Region	Certification	Certified units/sales
Portugal (AFP)	Platinum	8,000^{^}
^{^} Shipments figures based on certification alone.
