= Tracks of My Years =

Studio album by Bryan Adams
- Released: September 30, 2014
- Recorded: 2014
- Genre: Rock
- Length: 33:00
- Label: Polydor
- Producer: Bryan Adams; David Foster; Bob Rock

Bryan Adams chronology
11 (2008)	Tracks of My Years (2014)	Get Up (2015)

Singles from Tracks of My Years
- 1. "She Knows Me" Released: August 27, 2014

Tracks of My Years is the twelfth studio album by Canadian singer-songwriter Bryan Adams, released on September 30, 2014, by Polydor Records. The track list features 10 covers, including "Lay Lady Lay" (Bob Dylan), "I Can't Stop Loving You" (Ray Charles) and "Any Time at All" (The Beatles). The album also includes "She Knows Me", an original song written by Adams and Jim Vallance, which was released as the album's only single.

== Background ==
Adams said of Tracks of My Years: "Making the selection of the songs for the album took a long time. We recorded all kinds of songs until the songs sort of presented themselves, or sounded different enough from the originals. We did about three months of recording, spread out over the course of two years."

The album was mainly produced by David Foster and Adams. In 2016, Adams said he was "reluctant" to record a covers album, but his label Polydor wanted him to do it. Adams said, "I got into it in the end. And David is a brilliant producer — nothing against him. It just wasn’t something I really wanted to do." Adams simultaneously worked with producer Jeff Lynne on his thirteenth studio album, Get Up, which was released in 2015. Adams said of the process: "I would literally leave one studio where I was recording the covers with David Foster, and go to another studio where I was working on the new album with Jeff. That gave me the impetus to get through the Foster record, because I didn’t enjoy that at all."

== Commercial performance ==
The album debuted at number one on the Canadian Albums Chart, selling 14,000 copies in its first week and at number 22 in Italy. In the US, the album debuted at number 89 on the Billboard 200, selling 4,000 copies in its first week. The album has sold 14,000 copies in the US as of September 2015.

== Track listing ==
Standard edition
No.	Title	Writer(s)	Length
1.	"Any Time at All"	Lennon-McCartney	2:34
2.	"She Knows Me"	Bryan Adams, Jim Vallance	3:37
3.	"I Can't Stop Loving You"	Don Gibson	3:39
4.	"Kiss and Say Goodbye"	Winfred Lovett	3:10
5.	"Lay Lady Lay"	Bob Dylan	3:34
6.	"Rock and Roll Music"	Chuck Berry	2:34
7.	"Down on the Corner"	John Fogerty	2:39
8.	"Never My Love"	Don Addrisi, Dick Addrisi	3:17
9.	"Sunny"	Bobby Hebb	3:31
10.	"The Tracks of My Tears"	Robinson, Moore, Tarplin	2:56
11.	"God Only Knows"	Brian Wilson, Tony Asher	3:30

Deluxe edition (bonus tracks)
No.	Title	Writer(s)	Length
12.	"You've Been a Friend to Me"	Adams, Gretchen Peters	2:50
13.	"Help Me Make It Through the Night"	Kris Kristofferson	2:40
14.	"C'mon Everybody"	Eddie Cochran, Jerry Capehart	2:50
15.	"Many Rivers to Cross"	Jimmy Cliff	4:09
16.	"You Shook Me"	Willie Dixon, J.B. Lenoir	3:47

Japanese edition (bonus track)
No.	Title	Length
17.	"Let It Be Me"	3:20

== Personnel ==
- Bryan Adams – vocals, acoustic guitar, bass
- David Foster – piano, keyboards
- Gary Breit – piano, organ
- Mickey Currey – drums
- Keith Scott – electric guitar, EBow guitar
- Michael Thompson – electric guitar

Additional musicians

- Rusty Anderson – electric guitar
- Josh Freese – drums
- Norm Fisher – bass
- Bob Clearmountain – bass
- Chris Steele – percussion

Technical personnel

- Bryan Adams – production
- David Foster – production (all except 4, 6, 14)
- Bob Rock – production (4, 6, 14)
- Bob Ludwig – mastering

== Charts ==
Chart (2014)	Peak position
Australian Albums (ARIA)	61
Austrian Albums (Ö3 Austria)	5
Belgian Albums (Ultratop Flanders)	38
Belgian Albums (Ultratop Wallonia)	34
Canadian Albums (Billboard)	1
Danish Albums (Hitlisten)	13
Dutch Albums (Album Top 100)	41
German Albums (Offizielle Top 100)	5
Portuguese Albums (AFP)	10
Swiss Albums (Schweizer Hitparade)	6
UK Albums (OCC)	11

== Certifications ==
Region	Certification	Certified units/sales
Canada (Music Canada)	Gold	40,000^{^}
^{^} Shipments figures based on certification alone.
