= Spirit: Stallion of the Cimarron (soundtrack) =

2002 film soundtrack album

Soundtrack album by Bryan Adams and Hans Zimmer
- Released: May 14, 2002
- Recorded: 2001–2002
- Genres: Rock; soft rock
- Length: 59:55
- Label: A&M
- Producers: Bryan Adams; Hans Zimmer; Jay Rifkin; Gavin Greenaway; Steve Jablonsky; Matt Mahaffey; Patrick Leonard; Jimmy Jam and Terry Lewis

Bryan Adams chronology
The Best of Me (1999)	Spirit: Stallion of the Cimarron (2002)	Live at the Budokan (2003)

Singles from Spirit: Stallion of the Cimarron
- 1. "Here I Am" Released: June 11, 2002

Professional ratings
Review scores
Source	Rating
AllMusic	3/5 stars
Filmtracks	2/5 stars
Melodic.net	5/5 stars

Spirit: Stallion of the Cimarron is a soundtrack album and the ninth studio album by Bryan Adams. The songs were performed by Adams and the score was composed by Hans Zimmer to the animated feature of the same name. The album was released on May 14, 2002, and includes the European hit, "Here I Am".

Both the English and French versions of the album have Bryan Adams as the singer.

The German vocals were provided by Hartmut Engler, lead singer of the German pop band Pur.

Spanish vocals in the European version of the soundtrack were recorded by singer Raúl Malo.

Spanish vocals in the Latin version of the soundtrack were recorded by Mexican singer Erik Rubin.

Italian vocals in the Italian version of the soundtrack were recorded by singer Zucchero.

In Brazil, a Portuguese version of the soundtrack was recorded by Brazilian singer Paulo Ricardo.

In the Polish version, vocals were provided by Maciej Balcar, lead singer of the Polish blues rock band Dżem.

== Track listing ==
No.	Title	Writer(s)	Performer(s)	Length
1.	"Here I Am" (End Title)	Bryan Adams, Gretchen Peters, Hans Zimmer	Bryan Adams	4:44
2.	"I Will Always Return"	Adams, Robert John "Mutt" Lange, Zimmer	Bryan Adams	3:59
3.	"You Can't Take Me"	Adams, Lange, Gavin Greenaway	Bryan Adams	2:56
4.	"Get Off My Back"	Adams, Eliot Kennedy	Bryan Adams	2:50
5.	"Brothers Under the Sun"	Adams, Peters, Steve Jablonsky	Bryan Adams	3:57
6.	"Don't Let Go" (featuring Sarah McLachlan)	Adams, Lange, Peters, Greenaway	Bryan Adams, Sarah McLachlan	4:02
7.	"This Is Where I Belong"	Adams, Lange, Zimmer	Bryan Adams	2:21
8.	"Here I Am"	Adams, Peters, Zimmer	Bryan Adams	4:32
9.	"Sound the Bugle"	Greenaway, Trevor Horn	Bryan Adams	3:54
10.	"Run Free"	James Dooley, Jablonsky, Zimmer	Hans Zimmer	6:21
11.	"Homeland (Main Title)"	Zimmer	Hans Zimmer	3:41
12.	"Rain"	Zimmer	Hans Zimmer	2:50
13.	"The Long Road Back"	Jablonsky, Zimmer	Hans Zimmer	7:11
14.	"Nothing I've Ever Known"	Adams, Kennedy, Zimmer	Bryan Adams	3:52
15.	"I Will Always Return (Finale)"	Adams, Lange, Zimmer	Bryan Adams	2:46

== Personnel ==
- Bryan Adams – vocals, acoustic guitar, electric guitar, bass
- Gavin Greenway – keyboards, programming, conductor
- Steve Jablonsky – additional music, programming
- Patrick Leonard – keyboards, programming
- Hans Zimmer – keyboards, programming
- Mel Wesson – keyboards, programming, additional arrangements
- Matt Mahaffey – keyboards (4), drums (4), backing vocals (4), whistling (4)
- Sarah McLachlan – acoustic piano (6), vocals (6)
- Heitor Pereira – acoustic guitar, electric guitar
- Davey Johnstone – electric guitar
- Keith Scott – guitars
- David Channing – 12-string guitar
- Mickey Curry – drums
- Ashwin Sood – drums (4)
- Martin Tillman – electric cello
- Craig Eastman – fiddle
- Tonia Davall – orchestra contractor
- Perry Montague-Mason – concertmaster
- James Dooley – additional arrangements
- Rupert Gregson-Williams – additional arrangements
- Chris James - keyboards, additional arrangements
- The Pointless Brothers (Bryan Adams and Robert John "Mutt" Lange) – backing vocals

== Charts ==
Chart performance for Spirit: Stallion of the Cimarron
Chart (2002)	Peak position
Australian Albums (ARIA)	96
Austrian Albums (Ö3 Austria)	6
Belgian Albums (Ultratop Flanders)	6
Dutch Albums (Album Top 100)	22
European Albums (Music & Media)	9
French Albums (SNEP)	137
German Albums (Offizielle Top 100)	7
Italian Albums (FIMI)	35
Norwegian Albums (VG-lista)	19
Swedish Albums (Sverigetopplistan)	24
Swiss Albums (Schweizer Hitparade)	6
UK Albums (Official Charts)	8
US Billboard 200	40

== Certifications ==
Certifications for Spirit: Stallion of the Cimarron
Region	Certification	Certified units/sales
Switzerland (IFPI Switzerland)	Gold	20,000^{^}
United Kingdom (BPI)	Gold	100,000^{‡}
United States (RIAA)	Gold	500,000^{^}
^{^} Shipments figures based on certification alone.^{‡} Sales+streaming figures based on certification alone.
