= Loneliness Knows My Name =

Studio album by Patrick Park
- Released: 2003
- Genre: Indie, folk
- Length: 37:18
- Label: Downward Road Recordings / Hollywood Records

Patrick Park chronology
Under the Unminding Skies EP (2003)	Loneliness Knows My Name (2003)	Everyone's in Everyone (2007)

Professional ratings
Review scores
Source	Rating
Allmusic	4/5 stars

Loneliness Knows My Name is the full-length debut LP by singer-songwriter Patrick Park, released in 2003. Some of the songs have achieved popular status through their use on the television programme The O.C..

== Track listing ==
1. "Thunderbolt" – 2:56
2. "Honest Skrew" – 2:58
3. "Sons of Guns" – 3:47
4. "Nothing's Wrong" – 3:38
5. "Your Smile's a Drug" - 3:32
6. "Something Pretty" - 3:14
7. "Silver Girl" - 3:34
8. "Desperation Eyes" - 3:01
9. "Past Poisons" - 4:30
10. "Bullets by the Door" - 3:26
11. "Home for Now" - 2:42
