= Orphan (Darwin's Waiting Room album) =

Studio album by Darwin's Waiting Room
- Released: July 24, 2001
- Studio: Elysian Studios, Boca Raton, Florida
- Genre: Nu metal; rap metal
- Length: 41:23
- Label: MCA
- Producer: Jason Bieler

Darwin's Waiting Room chronology
Darwin's Waiting Room (1996)	Orphan (2001)	Apology Accepted (2003)

Professional ratings
Review scores
Source	Rating
AllMusic	3/5 stars
CoC	2/10 stars

Orphan is the second studio album by the Florida-based nu metal band Darwin's Waiting Room. The album was released on July 24, 2001, via MCA Records. The album peaked at No. 19 on the Billboard Heatseekers chart that year.

== Track listing ==
All tracks are written by Darwin's Waiting Room, except "Back That Azz Up" by Juvenile, Lil Wayne and Mannie Fresh.

No.	Title	Length
1.	"Feel So Stupid (Table 9)"	3:14
2.	"Live for the Moment"	3:20
3.	"Sometimes It Happens Like This"	3:17
4.	"In to the Dark"	3:57
5.	"Another Way"	4:18
6.	"Spent"	3:21
7.	"D.I.Y.M."	3:31
8.	"Realize"	3:26
9.	"Innosense" (featuring Shaggy)	3:57
10.	"Transparent"	3:46
11.	"All I Have Is Me"	5:16

Japanese edition bonus track
No.	Title	Length
12.	"Back That Azz Up"	2:55

== Personnel ==
- Michael "Grimm" Falk – emcee
- Jabe – vocals
- Eddie "The Kydd" Rendini – guitar
- Joe "Johnny 5" Perrone – drums
- Alex Cando – bass

=== Production ===
- Jason Bieler – producer
- Stephen Marcussen – mastering
- David Boucher – mixing
- Bob Clearmountain – mixing
- Keith Rose – engineer
- Jeanne Venton – production Coordination
- Fred Weiss – photography
