= Darwin's Waiting Room =

American nu metal band

- Darwin's Waiting Room in 2001

Background information
- Origin: Miami, Florida, U.S.
- Genres: Nu metal; rap metal
- Years active: 1995–2004
- Label: MCA
- Past members: Michael Irving Falk; Jean Baptiste-Blot; Edward Michael Rendini; Alexander Cando; Joseph Perrone

Darwin's Waiting Room was an American nu metal band from Miami, Florida, active from 1995 to 2004. The group achieved moderate commercial success with their major-label album, Orphan, which peaked at number 19 on the Billboard Heatseekers chart in 2001.

The band solidified its most well-known lineup in early 2000 and signed with MCA Records. Following the release of Orphan, they received significant airplay on MTV2 for the single "Feel So Stupid (Table 9)" and toured with fellow nu metal bands such as Godsmack, Deftones, and Nonpoint. The group disbanded in 2004 following several industry setbacks. Reports indicate they were dropped by their label during the merger of Universal Music Group and were unable to officially release their third album, Apology Accepted. Guitarist Eddie "The Kydd" Rendini officially announced the "amicable end" of the collaboration online in 2004.

== History ==
Darwin's Waiting Room formed in 1995 and went through several lineup changes before solidifying early in 2000. They signed to MCA Records and released their second album, Orphan, in 2001. The album peaked at No. 19 on the Billboard Heatseekers chart that year. Following the album's success, they scored airplay with the single "Feel So Stupid (Table 9)" on MTV2, MTVX and Much Music, and toured with Godsmack, Deftones, Nonpoint, and Machine Head. The third studio album, Apology Accepted, followed in 2003, but it was not officially released, though leaked online.

In 2004, guitarist Eddie "The Kydd" Rendini made a statement online to Digital Noise announcing an amicable end to the music collaboration.

In 2005, bassist Alex Cando joined Five Bolt Main, a Louisville, KY band, featuring former Flaw vocalist Chris Volz. The band disbanded in late 2006 when Flaw decided to reunite. Cando then joined Flaw for their reunion tour, later collaborating with Morgan Rose of Sevendust.

On January 30, 2015, former band member Edward Michael Rendini died at the age of 39.

== Members ==
Final lineup

- Jean Baptiste-Blot "Jabe" - vocals (1995-2004)
- Michael Irving "Grimm" Falk - vocals, rapping vocals (1995-2004)
- Edward Michael "Eddie The Kydd" Rendini - lead guitar (1995-2004) (November 09, 1976-January 30,2015)
- Alexander H Cando - bass guitar (1995-2004) Original member from their formation. Grew up close friends with original member (guitarist) and songwriter David Broder.
- Joseph Stephen "Joe" "Johnny 5" Perrone - drums (1997-2004)

Former members

- John Carpenter - drums (1996-1997)
- David Broder - rhythm guitar, songwriting (1995-2000) Dave also named the band Darwin’s Waiting Room upon their formation to allude to how Florida and Miami are still waiting to evolve. David and Alex grew up together and were in the band’s earliest beginning years — and played and won Miami’s “Zeta FM” Battle of the Bands which led the band to winning and receiving their first major record deal. Dave also won a turquoise, vintage Fender Strat.
- Seneca "Sensquatch" Konturas - lead guitar, backing vocals (1996)
- Seth "≤16" Horan - bass guitar, backing vocals (1996)

== Discography ==
- Darwin's Waiting Room (1996)
- Orphan (2001)
- Apology Accepted (2003)
