= Room Service (song) =

Single by Bryan Adams

from the album Room Service
- Released: March 28, 2005
- Genre: Rock
- Length: 2:53
- Label: Universal
- Songwriters: Bryan Adams, Eliot Kennedy
- Producer: Bryan Adams

Bryan Adams singles chronology
"Flying" (2004)	"Room Service" (2005)	"This Side of Paradise" (2005)

"Room Service" is a single by Canadian rock singer/songwriter and guitarist Bryan Adams. It was his third single from his ninth studio album Room Service, released in 2005.

== Track listings ==
=== CD ===
No.	Title	Writer(s)	Length
1.	"Room Service (single mix)"	Adams, Kennedy	3:06
2.	"Room Service (acoustic)"	Adams, Kennedy	2:53
3.	"Open Road (acoustic)"	Adams, Kennedy	3:35

== Charts ==
Chart (2005)	Peak position
Canada Hot AC Top 30 (Radio & Records)	27
Germany (GfK)	74
