= Gary Breit =

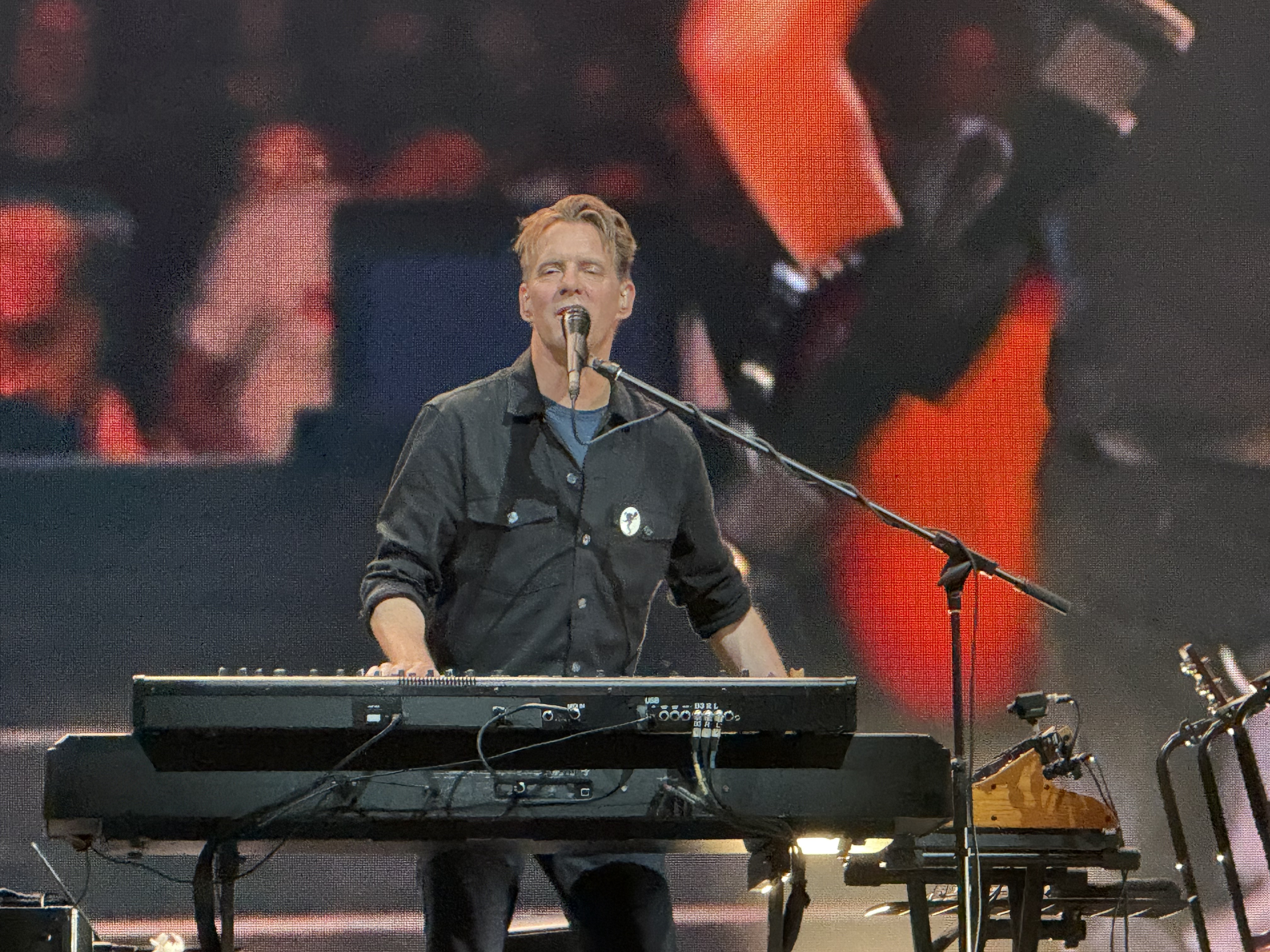
- Gary Breit in 2026

Background information
- Genres: Rock, rock and roll, soft rock
- Occupation: Musician
- Instruments: synthesizers, piano
- Years active: 1971–present

Gary Breit (June 18, 1960) is a Canadian keyboardist and vocalist best known for his collaboration with singer/songwriter Bryan Adams. He has also recorded with acts such as Amanda Marshall, Cassandra Wilson, Corey Hart, Amy Sky, Long John Baldry, Damhnait Doyle and has toured with Kim Mitchell and Bryan Adams. He has also released an album entitled Breit Bros with his brothers Kevin and Garth.

Breit played keyboards on Adams' 2004 album Room Service after the departure of Adams' former keyboardist, Tommy Mandel. He has subsequently toured continuously with Adams and his band.

== Appearances ==
- 1984 – The Pukka Orchestra – synthesizers
- 1985 – Corey Hart - Boy in the Box – synthesizers
- 1988 – Breit Bros. – synthesizers and lead vocals
- 1995 – Cassandra Wilson - New Moon Daughter – organ
- 1997 – Vermillion Skye - Random Kinetic Overtures – guest artist: synthesizers
- 1999 – Kim Mitchell - Kimosabe – synthesizers
- 2003 – Shaye - The Bridge – organ and piano
- 2004 – Bryan Adams - Room Service – synthesizers
- 2008 – Bryan Adams - 11 – organ and piano
