= You Want It You Got It =

You Want It, You Got It

Studio album by Bryan Adams
- Released: 28 July 1981
- Recorded: 1981
- Studios: Power Station (New York, US); Le Studio (Morin-Heights, Quebec, Canada)
- Genres: Rock, hard rock
- Length: 38:33
- Label: A&M
- Producers: Bryan Adams; Bob Clearmountain

Bryan Adams chronology
Bryan Adams (1980)	You Want It, You Got It (1981)	Cuts Like a Knife (1983)

Professional ratings
Review scores
Source	Rating
AllMusic	3.5/5 stars
MusicHound Rock	2.5/5 stars
The Rolling Stone Album Guide	2/5 stars

You Want It, You Got It is the second studio album by Canadian singer-songwriter Bryan Adams, released on July 28, 1981 by A&M Records.

== Background and recording ==
This was the album that created Adams' signature sound, which he has maintained throughout his recording career. Unlike Adams' debut album where he and Jim Vallance played most of the instruments themselves, You Want It You Got It was recorded live in the studio. The album was recorded at Le Studio in Morin-Heights, Quebec over a two-week period during the spring of 1981 and was mixed at The Power Station in New York City. The album was originally to be titled Bryan Adams Hasn't Heard Of You Either (due to critics' indifference to his first album and singles) but Adams' sense of humour didn't make it past the gatekeepers at the record company, who opted for the safer title.

== Release and reception ==
The first single "Lonely Nights" became a hit in upstate New York long before it broke anywhere else. This was partially due to a couple of late night DJs working in Rochester, Albany and Syracuse. Record World said of "Lonely Nights" that Adams' "raspy tenor stretches with convincing emotion on the chorus flights and his hellbent guitar solo will attract the attention of AOR rockers."

Within a few months the album had been picked up across the United States and Adams was soon on tour doing clubs and noon hour concerts for radio stations, as well as support to such acts as the Kinks and Foreigner. The song eventually peaked at number 3 on the Billboard Rock Tracks chart, while peaking at number 84 on the Billboard Hot 100. Two further singles, "Coming Home" and "Fits Ya Good", met with positive reviews by critics, the latter becoming Adams' first top 40 hit in Canada, peaking at number 30, and at number 15 on the Billboard Rock Tracks chart.

Several songs from the album have been recorded by other artists, including "Lonely Nights" by Uriah Heep, "Jealousy" by PRiSM, "Tonight" by Randy Meisner, and "Fits Ya Good" by Tove Naess. The first recording of "Lonely Nights" was released by Ian Lloyd in 1980 on the album 3WC (Third World Civilization).

== Track listing ==
All tracks are written by Bryan Adams and Jim Vallance, except where noted.

Side one
No.	Title	Length
1.	"Lonely Nights"	3:46
2.	"One Good Reason"	4:22
3.	"Don't Look Now"	3:06
4.	"Coming Home"	3:34
5.	"Fits Ya Good"	4:35

Side two
No.	Title	Writer(s)	Length
6.	"Jealousy"	Adams; Lindsay Mitchell	3:49
7.	"Tonight"		4:58
8.	"You Want It, You Got It"	Adams	3:49
9.	"Last Chance"	Adams	3:17
10.	"No One Makes It Right"	Adams	3:17
Total length:			38:33

2012 Japan SHM-CD bonus track
No.	Title	Length
11.	"Fits Ya Good" (from Live at the Budokan)	3:55
Total length:		42:48

== Personnel ==
Personnel taken from You Want It You Got It liner notes.

- Bryan Adams – vocals, guitars, piano
- Tommy Mandel – keyboards
- Brian Stanley – bass
- Mickey Curry – drums

Additional musicians

- Jamie Glaser – guitar solos (5, 6, 8)
- G. E. Smith – guitar fills (6)
- Jimmy Maelen – percussion
- John Gerber – saxophone solo (9)
- Cindy Bullens – backing vocals (10)

Technical personnel

- Bryan Adams – production
- Bob Clearmountain – production, recording
- Garry Rindfuss – recording assistance
- Bob Ludwig – mastering

== Production ==
- Bryan Adams – producer
- Bob Clearmountain – producer, recording, mixing
- Gary Rindfuss – recording assistant
- Paul Northfield – technical assistant
- Bob Ludwig – mastering
- Masterdisk (New York City, New York) – mastering location
- Chuck Beeson – art direction
- Melanie Nissen – design
- Lynn Goldsmith – photography
- Bruce Allen – management

== Charts ==
Chart positions for You Want It You Got It
Chart (1982)	Peak position
Canadian Albums (RPM)	50
US Billboard 200	118

Chart (1985)	Peak position
UK Albums (Official Charts)	78

== Certifications ==
Region	Certification	Certified units/sales
Canada (Music Canada)	Gold	50,000^{^}
^{^} Shipments figures based on certification alone.
