= Open Road (Bryan Adams song) =

2004 single by Bryan Adams

Single by Bryan Adams

from the album Room Service
- B-side: "Blessing in Disguise"; "Friday Night in London"
- Released: September 13, 2004
- Length: 3:28
- Label: Polydor
- Songwriters: Bryan Adams; Eliot Kennedy
- Producer: Bryan Adams

Bryan Adams singles chronology
"Here I Am" (2002)	"Open Road" (2004)	"Flying" (2004)

"Open Road" is the first single from Canadian singer Bryan Adams' 10th studio album, Room Service (2004). The single reached number one in Hungary, number 17 in Switzerland, and number 21 on the UK Singles Chart. The music video takes place in a car during a traffic jam.

== Music video ==
The music video was filmed in Toronto, Canada.

== Track listings ==
UK CD single

1. "Open Road"
2. "Blessing in Disguise"
3. "Friday Night in London"

European CD single

1. "Open Road"
2. "Blessing In Disguise"

== Charts ==
=== Weekly charts ===
Chart (2004)	Peak position
Austria (Ö3 Austria Top 40)	35
Belgium (Ultratop 50 Flanders)	49
Canada AC Top 30 (Radio & Records)	3
Canada Hot AC Top 30 (Radio & Records)	3
Canada Rock Top 30 (Radio & Records)	12
Germany (GfK)	23
Greece (IFPI)	36
Hungary (Rádiós Top 40)	1
Ireland (IRMA)	50
Italy (FIMI)	32
Netherlands (Dutch Top 40 Tipparade)	3
Netherlands (Single Top 100)	28
Romania (Romanian Top 100)	47
Scotland Singles (OCC)	18
Switzerland (Schweizer Hitparade)	17
UK Singles (OCC)	21

=== Year-end charts ===
Chart (2004)	Position
Hungary (Rádiós Top 40)	43

Chart (2005)	Position
Hungary (Rádiós Top 40)	59
