= Flying (Bryan Adams song) =

Single by Bryan Adams

from the album Room Service
- Released: November 29, 2004 (UK)
- Genre: Rock
- Length: 4:04
- Label: Universal
- Songwriters: Bryan Adams, Robert John "Mutt" Lange
- Producers: Bryan Adams, Robert John "Mutt" Lange

Bryan Adams singles chronology
"Open Road" (2004)	"Flying" (2004)	"Room Service" (2005)

"Flying" is a single by Canadian rock singer Bryan Adams, from his album Room Service, released in 2004.

The song reached number 39 in the UK Singles Chart, making it his second UK Top 40 single from the album, and as of 2026, remains his last UK Top 40 hit.

== Track listings ==
=== CD ===
No.	Title	Writer(s)	Length
1.	"Flying"	B. Adams, R.J. Lange	4:04
2.	"You Walked In"	B. Adams, R.J. Lange	4:16
3.	"I Want It All - [Dub Mix]"	B. Adams, R.J. Lange	4:47

== Charts ==
Chart (2004)	Peak position
Canada AC Top 30 (Radio & Records)	3
Canada Hot AC Top 30 (Radio & Records)	19
Germany (GfK)	68
Netherlands (Single Top 100)	86
Switzerland (Schweizer Hitparade)	51
UK Singles (OCC)	39
