= Live at the Budokan (Bryan Adams album) =

Live album by Bryan Adams
- Released: June 17, 2003
- Recorded: June 15–16, 2000
- Venue: Nippon Budokan
- Genre: Rock
- Label: A&M

Bryan Adams chronology
| Spirit: Stallion of the Cimarron (2002) | Live at the Budokan (2003) | Room Service (2004) |

Professional ratings
Review scores
| Source | Rating |
|---|---|
| AllMusic | 3/5 stars |

Live at the Budokan is a live album by Canadian musician Bryan Adams. The album was recorded live at the Nippon Budokan on June 15 & 16, 2000 in Tokyo, Japan. Adams was joined by band members Keith Scott on guitar, and Mickey Curry on drums.

The album contains both a DVD of the live concert, and a CD with fifteen of the songs recorded at the show.

== Track listing ==
=== CD ===
| No. | Title | Writer(s) | Length |
|---|---|---|---|
| 1. | "How Do Ya Feel Tonight" | Adams, Thornalley | 1:29 |
| 2. | "Can't Stop This Thing We Started" | Adams, Lange | 3:53 |
| 3. | "Summer of '69" | Adams, Vallance | 4:16 |
| 4. | "Fits Ya Good" | Adams, Vallance | 3:54 |
| 5. | "(Everything I Do) I Do It for You" | Adams, Lange, Kamen | 4:10 |
| 6. | "Cuts Like a Knife" | Adams, Vallance | 6:30 |
| 7. | "When You're Gone" | Adams, Kennedy | 3:39 |
| 8. | "Have You Ever Really Loved a Woman?" | Adams, Lange, Kamen | 4:51 |
| 9. | "Getaway" | Adams, Peters | 4:05 |
| 10. | "Blues Jam: If Ya Wanna Be Bad - Ya Gotta Be Good / Let's Make a Night to Remember" | Adams, Lange, Peters | 4:19 |
| 11. | "Cloud Number Nine" | Adams, Martin, Peters | 3:59 |
| 12. | "You're Still Beautiful to Me" | Adams, Lange | 4:23 |
| 13. | "Run to You" | Adams, Vallance | 5:25 |
| 14. | "Please Forgive Me" | Adams, Lange | 2:13 |
| 15. | "The Best of Me" | Adams, Lange | 4:30 |

=== DVD ===
| No. | Title | Writer(s) | Length |
|---|---|---|---|
| 1. | "How Do Ya Feel Tonight" | Adams, Thornalley |
| 2. | "Back to You" | Adams, Kennedy |
| 3. | "18 til I Die" | Adams, Lange |
| 4. | "Can't Stop This Thing We Started" | Adams, Lange |
| 5. | "Summer of '69" | Adams, Vallance |
| 6. | "It's Only Love" | Adams, Vallance |
| 7. | "(Everything I Do) I Do It for You" | Adams, Lange, Kamen |
| 8. | "Getaway" | Adams, Peters |
| 9. | "Cuts Like a Knife" | Adams, Vallance |
| 10. | "When You're Gone" | Adams, Kennedy |
| 11. | "Have You Ever Really Loved a Woman?" | Adams, Lange, Kamen |
| 12. | "Into the Fire" | Adams, Vallance |
| 13. | "Remember" | Adams, Vallance |
| 14. | "I'm Ready" | Adams, Vallance |
| 15. | "Heaven" | Adams, Vallance |
| 16. | "Blues Jam: If Ya Wanna Be Bad - Ya Gotta Be Good / Let's Make a Night to Remember" | Adams, Lange, Peters |
| 17. | "The Only Thing That Looks Good on Me Is You" | Adams, Lange |
| 18. | "Cloud Number Nine" | Adams, Martin, Peters |
| 19. | "Somebody" | Adams, Vallance |
| 20. | "Run to You" | Adams, Vallance |
| 21. | "Please Forgive Me" | Adams, Lange |
| 22. | "The Best of Me" | Adams, Lange |

Bonus (additional tracks)
| No. | Title | Writer(s) | Length |
|---|---|---|---|
| 1. | "Fits Ya Good" | Adams, Vallance |
| 2. | "I Don't Wanna Live Forever" | Adams, Peters |
| 3. | "Before the Night Is Over" | Adams, Martin |
| 4. | "You're Still Beautiful to Me" | Adams, Lange |

== Credits ==
2003 DVD credits

- Project manager: Pamela Fisher
- Producer/editor: Edi Osghian
- Project management: Colin Logan
- Assistant editor: JR Mackie
- Authoring: Sergiy Melnik
- Design: Dirk Rudolph
- Technical supervisor: Ron O Vermeulen
- Audio mixing: Bob Clearmountain
- Audio assembling/mastering: Chris Potter
- DVD product manager: Jeff Fura (UME)

2000 Japanese TV crew credits

- Executive producers: Katsuhito Itagaki, Akitoshi Asazuma
- Director: Kiyoshi Iwasawa
- Production manager: Matt Minagawa
- Assistant director: Mika Ikeda
- Technical director: Kazuo Hibi
- Switcher: Shigeo Shinjo
- Camera: Motohiro Nakajima (chief), Hironobu Mizuta, Katsunori Yokochi, Jun Iwasaka, Akihito Kajiura, Hiroki Oshima, Hiroshi Nishimura
- Audio: Jun Ishikawa (chief), Norishige Nojiri, Eri Kartsube, Tomohiro Izumi
- Video engineer: Takeshi Terado (chief), Koji Kuroda, Takuya Hashiba, Hideki Takahashi
- Video editor: Masahumi Ushiroebisu
