= Keith Scott (musician) =

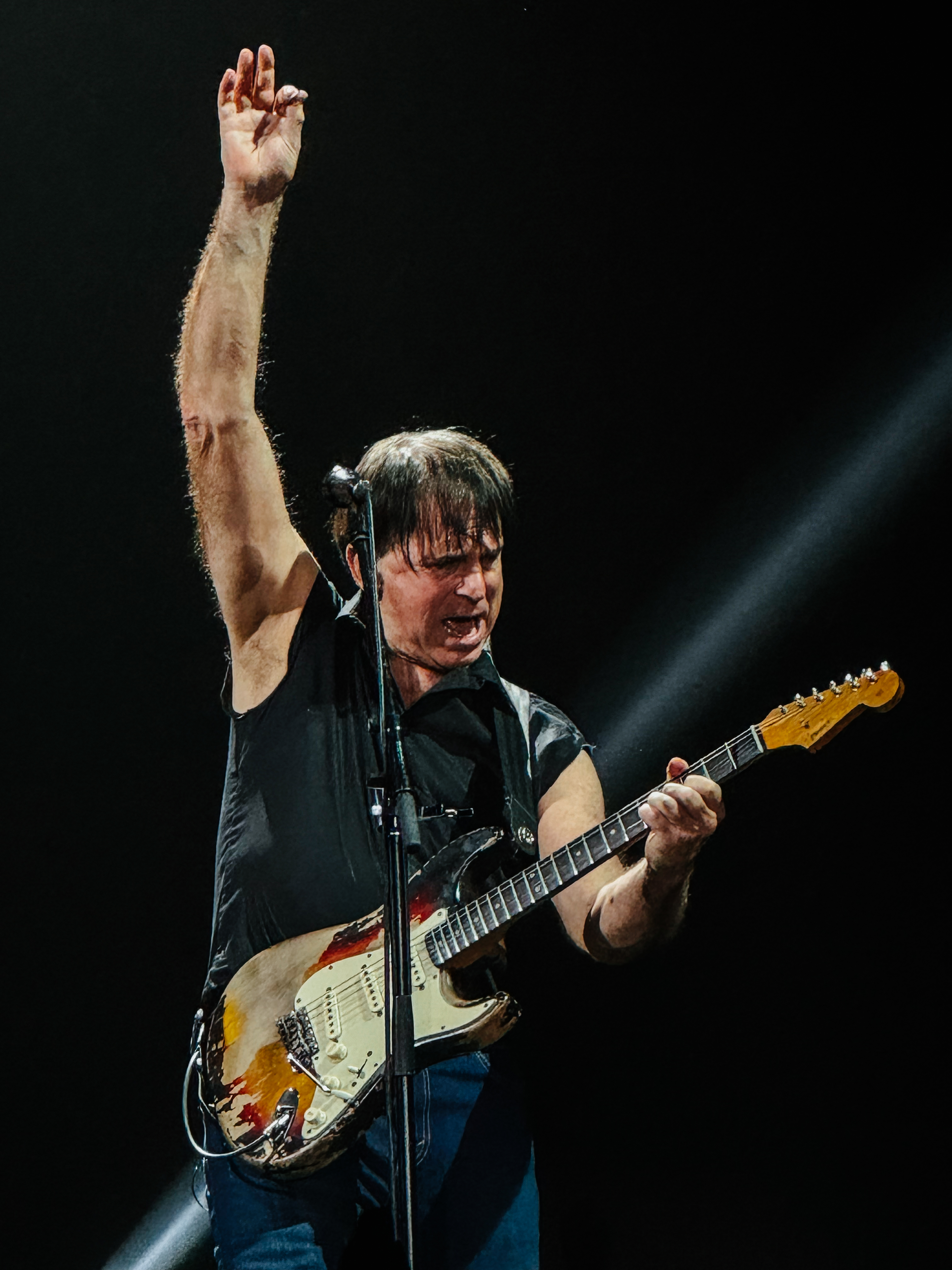
- Keith Scott live in Stockholm 2024

Background information
- Born: Keith Douglas Scott; July 20, 1954 (age 72); Vancouver, British Columbia
- Genres: Rock, hard rock, soft rock
- Occupations: Musician, guitarist
- Instruments: Guitar, bass, backing vocals
- Years active: 1971–present

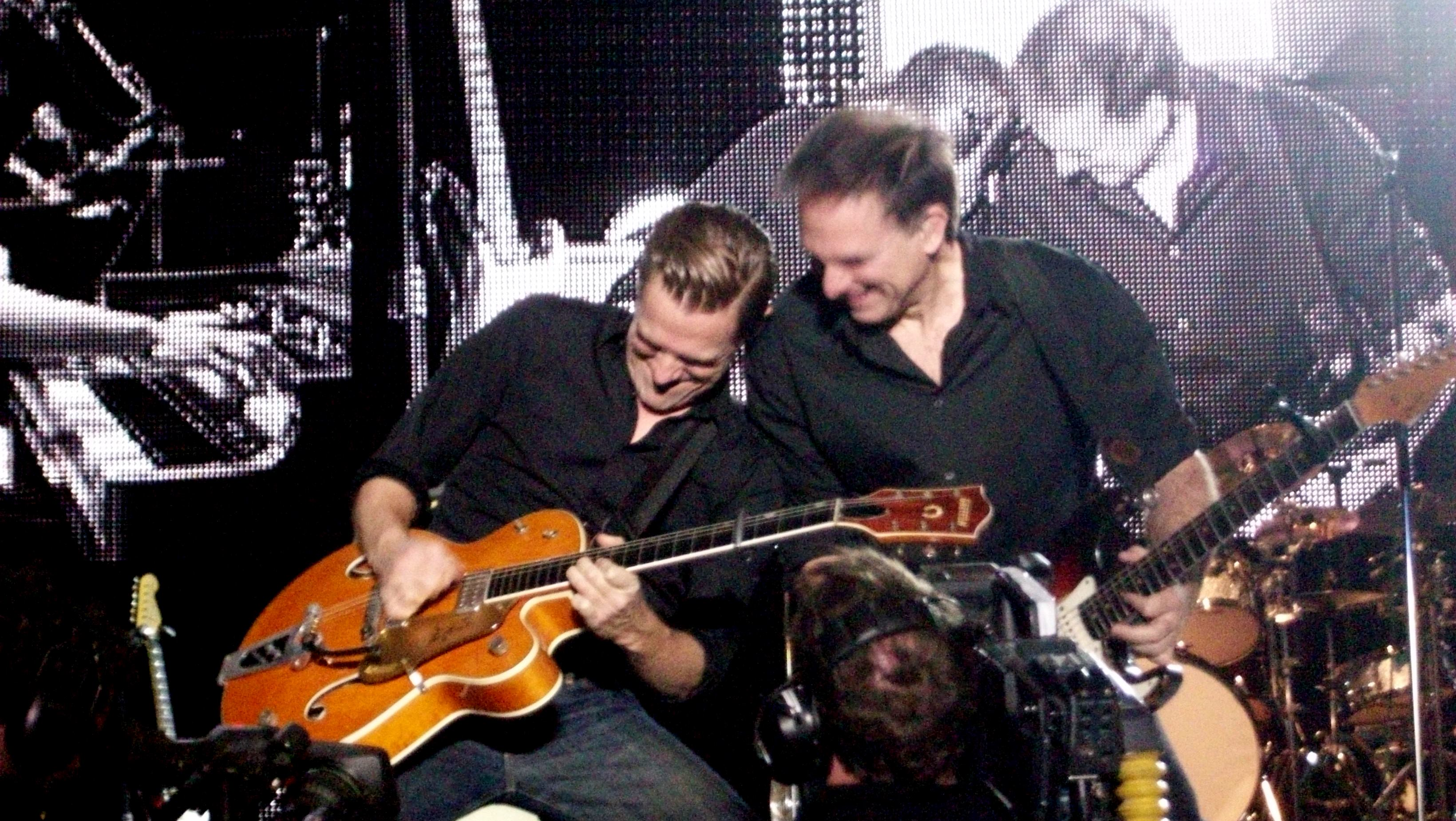
With Bryan Adams during their tour in Bangalore, India in 2011.

Keith Douglas Scott (born July 20, 1954) is a Canadian guitarist. He is best known for his collaboration with Bryan Adams, for whom he has played lead guitar, since 1976. He has also worked with notable singers including Cher, Tina Turner, David Bowie, Bryan Ferry, Tom Cochrane, Craig Northey, João Pedro Pais, Jann Arden.

== Biography ==
=== Early life ===
Scott was born in Vancouver, British Columbia. His father played jazz piano and his mother sang occasionally. At age 14, he learned to play the acoustic guitar and, by the time he was 17, had acquired a used 1960s Fender Stratocaster, which was to become a regular instrument. Many of his musical influences, including Jimi Hendrix, Eric Clapton and Jeff Beck, were also associated with this instrument.

Scott formed a band with people he had met at school but quickly found work with better-known bands such as "Bowser Moon", The Handley Page Group and Zingo, playing about 300 shows a year in the then lucrative nightclub scene.

=== Work with Bryan Adams ===
Scott was introduced to Adams in Ontario in the summer of 1976. In the late 1970s, he started doing some recording work for the then-unknown Adams. This proved successful and within a year, Scott was touring with Adams. They have been together on stage ever since.

In a Twitter post in May 2016, Bryan Adams described Scott as "the most underrated guitarist ever".

== Musical style and influence ==
Writing for Premier Guitar, Nashville bassist and producer Victor Brodén wrote:

"Keith Scott [...] is an endless source of inspiration for me. His solos are immediate. And anyone is able to sing them after just one or two listens. He plays the most simple, hooky, major-scale melodies, mixes them with a little blues to make them slightly dirty, and then finishes it all off with a right-hand attack and intent that floors me. I try to craft my bass lines like Keith crafts guitar solos."

Notably among his admirers was Eddie Van Halen, who held Scott in particularly high regard. While presenting guitarist, rock journalist and author Joe Matera's book "Louder Than Words: Beyond the Backstage Pass" (2024), the author identified as all-time favorite guitar solo Scott's in "Native Son" from Bryan Adams' album Into the Fire, Matera said about it:

“I think that guitar solo, and I’ll stake my reputation, that’s one of the greatest guitar solos ever committed to tape.[...] “Because in all the guitar magazines when I write the top-10 guitar solos of all time, it always mentions Stairway to Heaven, Comfortably Numb, but no one ever mentions Native Son by Keith Scott. And I think that solo as a guitar player has got everything: taste, melody, style, you name it. And I think it’s so overlooked.”

== Instruments and equipment ==
Gretsch produced a "Keith Scott Nashville Gold Top" signature guitar, to Scott's specifications.

Scott mainly uses a Fender Stratocaster when on tour with Bryan Adams though he does change guitars throughout the set. In the early to mid-'80s, he mainly used a customized Fender Stratocaster, called "The Beast", equipped with a Seymour Duncan humbucker in the bridge position. Towards the end of the '80s he used vintage strats and a Telecaster on tour. Keith is currently using his battered 1963 Fender Stratocaster and a Gibson Les Paul Goldtop when on tour.

He has been using Marshall Plexi and Vox AC-30-style amps since his early days with Adams.

Scott uses a variety of Boss Pedals as well as an Ibanez Tube Screamer.

== Personal life ==
Scott resides in San Diego, California. He is married and has two children.
