= Ian Cameron (musician) =

Canadian mandolinist and fiddler

Ian Cameron is a Canadian fiddler and composer based in British Columbia. He also plays guitar and mandolin. He has performed and recorded with several bands, including Strange Advance, Faith and Desire, and the duo Ruckus Deluxe. He collaborated with Arun Shenoy on the Grammy-nominated album Rumbadoodle.

== Early life ==
Cameron was born in Vancouver, British Columbia. He studied classical violin.

== Career ==
Cameron joined the band Strange Advance as a session player on their 1985 album 2WO . He toured with them in Eastern Canada and also contributed to their 1998 album The Distance Between.

After the breakup of Strange Advance, Cameron joined the quartet Faith and Desire, which performed internationally and which had released two albums by 2012.

In 2002 Cameron was a member of the Celtic band Tiller's Folly in British Columbia. In 2003 the band recorded an album of Celtic-style folk music with original songs, A Ripple in Time.

Cameron and guitarist Chad Oliver formed the band Ruckus Deluxe, based in Whistler, BC, in which Cameron plays fiddle, mandolin and electric guitar. The pair played a mix of country, rock and pop music, and released an album, Better at Night.

In 2013, while living in Coquitlam, Cameron recorded on the album Rumbadoodle, and co-wrote two of its songs. The album was a project of Arun Shenoy, and much of the music was created through long-distance collaboration. The album was nominated for a Grammy Award as Best Pop Instrumental in 2013. Cameron also contributed to Shenoy's 2016 release A Stagey Bank Affair.

As a member of the tribute band Atlantic Crossing, Cameron traveled to Alert, Nunavut in 2014 to entertain at the Canadian Forces Station there.
