= The Warriors EP, Volume 2 =

EP by P.O.D.
- Released: November 15, 2005
- Genre: Alternative metal
- Length: 27:58
- Label: Atlantic
- Producers: P.O.D., Travis Wyrick

P.O.D. chronology
Payable on Death (2003)	The Warriors EP, Volume 2 (2005)	Testify (2006)

Professional ratings
Review scores
Source	Rating
Christianity Today	3.5/5 stars
Jesus Freak Hideout	3.5/5 stars

The Warriors EP, Volume 2 is P.O.D.'s third EP, second in their "Warriors EP" series, which contains demos from the Testify recording sessions, a cover of the Payola$ song, "Eyes of a Stranger", and live versions of "Wildfire" and "Boom" recorded at Cornerstone Festival 2004. The inside of the cover contains a message from lead singer Sonny Sandoval to the 'Warriors', P.O.D.'s worldwide following of fans. The EP was released on November 15, 2005 and was limited to 40,000 copies.

== Track listing ==
All tracks are written by P.O.D., except "Eyes of a Stranger", written by Paul Hyde and Bob Rock.

No.	Title	Length
1.	"If It Wasn't for You"	3:40
2.	"Teachers" (Palm Springs Demo)	4:28
3.	"Ya Mama" (Palm Springs Demo) (now "Sounds Like War")	3:10
4.	"Why Wait?"	3:41
5.	"Eyes of a Stranger" (Payola$ cover)	4:18
6.	"Boom" (Live at Cornerstone)	5:14
7.	"Wildfire" (Live at Cornerstone)	2:57
Total length:		27:58

== Personnel ==
P.O.D.

- Sonny Sandoval – lead vocals
- Jason Truby – guitars, backing vocals
- Traa Daniels – bass, backing vocals
- Wuv Bernardo – drums, backing vocals

Production

- Travis Wyrick – production, mixing, audio engineer
- Mike Dearing – assistant mixing, audio engineer
- Louie Teran – mastering
- P.O.D. – co-production

Additional personnel

- Tim Pacheco – trumpet, percussion, additional vocals
- ODZ – additional guitar
- Edi Fitzroy – additional vocals

Management

- John Rubeli – A&R
- Tim M. Cook – management
- David Burrier – product manager
