= Between a Rock and a Hyde Place: The Best of Payola$ =

Greatest hits album by Payola$
- Released: 1987
- Length: 50:31
- Label: A&M

Between a Rock & a Hyde Place: The Best of Payola$ is a greatest hits album by the Payola$, released in 1987 after A&M had dropped the Payola$ from the label, and after the band had rebranded themselves as Rock and Hyde and released Under the Volcano through Capitol/EMI.

== Track listing ==
All songs by Bob Rock and Paul Hyde except as indicated

Side One

1. "China Boys" – 3:19
2. "In a Place Like This" – 3:56 (P.Hyde)
3. "Soldier" – 4:15
4. "Romance" – 3:33
5. "Eyes of a Stranger" – 4:54
6. "I'll Find Another (Who Can Do It Right)" – 3:37

Side Two

1. "Where Is this Love" – 5:54
2. "Never Said I Loved You" – 3:18
3. "Stuck in the Rain" – 3:50
4. "You're the Only Love" – 4:08 (B.Rock/D.Foster/P.Hyde/M.Nelson)
5. "It Must Be Love" – 4:38 (B.Rock/P.Hyde/M.Nelson)
6. "Here's the World" – 4:27 (B.Rock/D.Foster/P.Hyde/M.Nelson)
