= Rooftop Records =

Christian music record label (1982–1984)

- Parent company: Highway Missionary Society
- Founded: 1982
- Founder: Jim Palosaari, Paul Jenkins
- Defunct: 1984
- Distributor: Benson Records
- Genre: Christian, Christian rock
- Country of origin: United States
- Location: Wilderville, Oregon

Rooftop Records was a Christian music record label, founded in 1982 by the Highway Missionary Society, the parent organization of the band Servant, and distributed by Benson Records. The label was formed to gain greater creative control for the band, as well as a vehicle to promote artists they believed in. Due to the financial stress of supporting Servant's "Great American Album Giveaway" tour, Benson dissolved the relationship, bringing an early end to the nascent label.

== Artist roster ==
- Mac Frampton (pianist, à la Dino)
- Robyn Pope (CCM singer)
- Servant (rock band)
- Shelter (a Michigan-based rock band, not to be confused with Shelter, a New York City band formed by Ray Cappo)
- Loyd Thogmartin (MOR singer)

== Discography ==
Year	Catalog #	Artist	Title
1982	RT 1000	Servant	World of Sand
1983	RT 1001	Servant	Treeplanter Stomp/Cog in the Wheel (7" single)
1983	RT01003	Servant	World of Sand (reissued)
1983	RT02000	Servant	Caught in the Act of Loving Him
1983	RT01100	Robyn Pope	Always, Robyn
1983	RT01200	Loyd Thogmartin	Simple Direction
1983	RT01300	Shelter	Prophets and Clowns
1984	RT01400	Mac Frampton	Playing for the King
