= Classical electric guitar =

Musical instrument design

Gibson Chet Atkins CE/CEC
- Manufacturer: Gibson
- Period: 1982–2005

Construction
- Body type: Solid

Woods
- Body: Mahogany

Colors available
- Black, natural, white, red wine

Classical electric guitars, also known as nylon-string electric guitars, represent a unique fusion of traditional classical guitar design and modern electric guitar technology. These instruments combine the rich and warm tonal qualities of nylon-stringed classical guitars with the versatility and amplified sound capabilities of electric guitars. By integrating nylon strings with onboard electronics, pickups, and preamp systems, classical electric guitars offer musicians a wide range of sonic possibilities for various musical genres and performance settings.

When capturing the sound of nylon strings on an electric guitar, specific pickups are typically used to accurately reproduce the warm and resonant tones associated with classical guitars. The most common types of pickups used for capturing the sound of nylon strings are piezo pickups and transducer pickups.

Piezo pickups, short for piezoelectric pickups, rely on the piezoelectric effect to convert mechanical vibrations into electrical signals. These pickups are often placed underneath the saddle or bridge of the guitar, where they can detect the vibrations of the nylon strings. Piezo pickups are known for their ability to capture the natural acoustic qualities of the strings and reproduce the nuances of the instrument's sound.

Transducer pickups, on the other hand, work by directly sensing the vibrations of the guitar's soundboard. They are typically attached to the top or inside the body of the guitar, allowing them to pick up the vibrations and translate them into electrical signals. Transducer pickups are designed to capture the full spectrum of the instrument's sound, including the rich harmonics and resonance of the nylon strings.

Both piezo and transducer pickups can be used individually or in combination with each other to achieve a more balanced and natural sound reproduction of nylon strings on electric guitars. Additionally, some manufacturers offer specialized pickup systems specifically designed for capturing the unique tonal characteristics of nylon-stringed instruments.

== Gibson Chet Atkins CEC/CE ==
The Gibson Chet Atkins CEC was a classical electric guitar manufactured by Gibson and released in 1982. Developed with guitarist Chet Atkins and Kentucky luthier Hascal Haile, the Chet Atkins CEC (Cutaway Electric Classical) merged solid-body electric guitar with classical guitar, resulting in a nylon-string instrument that could be played at high volumes in large auditoriums without feedback.

The instrument featured a 25½ inch scale length and was produced in two neck widths, the CE (1 7/8 inch) and the CEC (2 inches, the standard for most classical guitars). The body featured sound chambers to reduce weight while the top was solid spruce or ceder. The Chet Atkins CEC had a mahogany neck while its pick up system consisted of six individual pieces installed under the bridge. Volume and tone controls were located on the rim.

Classical guitarists have given the innovation little credence, but pop and rock music stars like Sting, Earl Klugh, Zappacosta, David Gilmour, Jack Johnson, Gipsy Kings, Mark Knopfler, Gustavo Cerati, have played it to millions of concert-goers. Gibson also manufactured a model called the Chet Atkins CE which had a smaller 1-7/8" nut width.

The guitar was marketed in black, natural, white, and red wine colors. Gibson discontinued the CEC on January 1, 2006.

The Chet Atkins family had also a steel-string acoustic version released in 1987, the "Chet Atkins SST".

== Godin Multiac ==
The Godin Multiac is a series of classical electric guitars designed and manufactured by Godin Guitars. Introduced in 1993, the Multiac series offers a range of instruments that combine elements of classical and electric guitars, catering to the needs of both classical guitarists and performers in amplified settings.

The Godin Multiac guitars feature a chambered body design, which contributes to their enhanced acoustic resonance and feedback resistance. This construction allows the instruments to produce a rich and full-bodied sound, similar to that of traditional classical guitars. The bodies are typically made of tonewoods such as mahogany or maple, with solid spruce or cedar tops.

One of the distinguishing features of the Multiac series is the integration of nylon strings with onboard electronics and pickups. This combination allows players to achieve the warm and expressive tones associated with nylon-stringed classical guitars while offering the flexibility and versatility of an electric guitar. The guitars are equipped with high-quality piezo or transducer pickups and custom preamp systems, enabling easy amplification and control of the instrument's sound. The Multiac series includes various models with different pickup configurations and features to suit different playing styles and preferences. Some models incorporate additional features like built-in MIDI capabilities, which allow for integration with synthesizers and other electronic music equipment.

Renowned for their craftsmanship and attention to detail, Godin Multiac guitars have gained popularity among professional musicians, particularly in the jazz, fusion, and classical genres. The instruments' versatility makes them suitable for a wide range of musical applications, from studio recordings to live performances.

Godin's commitment to innovation and the pursuit of high-quality sound has solidified the Multiac series as a notable contribution to the world of classical electric guitars. The instruments have garnered a reputation for their exceptional playability, tonal range, and ability to bridge the gap between the traditional nuances of a classical guitar and the amplified sound required in contemporary music settings.

== Ibanez Models ==
The Ibanez SC500N is a classical electric guitar model introduced by Ibanez in 1998 as part of their S Classic series. It stands out among modern Ibanez solid body guitars for its unique configuration, featuring nylon strings and piezo pickups instead of magnetic pickups.

Inspired by the marriage of the S series and the Radius series, the SC500N features a mahogany body with a bound spruce top and a 25.1" (638mm) scale mahogany neck. The 22-fret rosewood fingerboard with binding and dot position markers completes the elegant design. Equipped with a rosewood bridge and under-saddle piezo pickup, the SC500N offers a natural and acoustic-like sound when amplified.

The guitar was marketed in natural, marine sunburst, and antique violin. Ibanez discontinued the model after 2000.

The Ibanez TOD10N is a classical electric guitar model introduced by Ibanez in late 2022. Designed as a signature model for American guitarist Tim Henson of Polyphia.

The TOD10N is based on the discontinued Ibanez SC500N that had limited commercial success. Henson discovered it while browsing a pawn shop in Europe and was intrigued by its potential for creating unique samples and loops. Despite Ibanez's initial hesitations about reviving the model, Henson's persistence and a demonstration of its musical possibilities convinced the brand to greenlight his signature model.

The TOD10N features a very thin FRH hollow body with a solid Sitka spruce top, sapele back and sides, and pearloid binding. It sports a C-shaped nyatoh neck, a walnut fretboard with pearloid binding and the unique "Tree of Death" thorned vine and rose inlays (a fresh take on the "Tree of Life" inlay seen on Steve Vai's signature Ibanez models). The TOD10N showcases an oval sound port on the top side near the upper horn, replacing the traditional sound hole. Equipped with a Fishman Sonicore under-saddle pickup and an Ibanez AEQ210TF preamp with an onboard tuner, the TOD10N offers a versatile acoustic-electric playing experience.

The TOD10N is available in transparent black flat.

The Ibanez FRH10N is a classical electric guitar model introduced by Ibanez in 2023 as part of their FRH series. Developed in response to the overwhelming popularity of the Ibanez TOD10N. This guitar presents a compelling option for musicians who prefer a classical electric guitar without the exclusivity of a signature model.

The FRH10N shares the same sleek and thin FR hollow body design as the TOD10N, as well as the oval sound port and solid Sitka spruce top. With black and white binding, sapele sides and back, and a C-shaped nyatoh neck. Its slotted headstock and walnut fretboard with black binding and small white dot position markers add to its stylish aesthetics. Equipped with an Ibanez T-bar under-saddle pickup and an Ibanez AHA-1 preamp powered by button cells.

The FRH10N is available in natural flat or brown sunburst.

== Córdoba Stage ==
The Córdoba Stage is a notable addition to the realm of classical electric guitars. Introduced by Córdoba Guitars, this instrument was recognized with the prestigious Best in Show award at the 2022 NAMM Show. The Córdoba Stage represents the brand's first foray into nylon string electric guitars, catering to the needs of performers in amplified settings while retaining Córdoba's authentic acoustic nylon-string tone.

At the core of the Córdoba Stage is the Stage Pickup System, a collaborative effort with Fishman. This cutting-edge pickup system ensures consistent and faithful reproduction of Córdoba's unplugged acoustic sound, making the guitar versatile across various platforms, from intimate studio recordings to large-scale stadium performances.

Designed specifically for stage use, the Córdoba Stage features a fully chambered body constructed from mahogany. This innovative design reduces weight while enhancing resonance, allowing the guitar's top to resonate freely and produce a natural acoustic tone reminiscent of traditional nylon-string guitars. The instrument's ergonomic shape and the slimmer Cordoba Fusion Neck offer players a playing experience that closely resembles that of a steel string guitar. This feature not only appeals to players with smaller hands but also provides a smooth transition for those accustomed to traditional acoustic guitars.
