= The Distance Between =

Studio album by Strange Advance
- Released: 1988; June 24, 2016 (Remastered CD)
- Genre: Rock, new wave
- Label: Current Records
- Producer: Drew Arnott, Howard Ayee, Joe Primeau

Strange Advance chronology
2WO (1985)	The Distance Between (1988)

Professional ratings
Review scores
Source	Rating
AllMusic	4/5 stars

The Distance Between is the third studio album by Canadian new wave band Strange Advance. It was released in 1988, and featured the Canadian hit single "Love Becomes Electric". The album was remastered and re-released on CD in 2016 with two bonus tracks, an extended club mix of "Love Becomes Electric" and the previously unreleased song, "Flow My Tears".

== Track listing ==
No.	Title	Writer(s)	Length
1.	"Till the Stars Fall"	Drew Arnott, Darryl Kromm	4:06
2.	"Love Becomes Electric"	Kromm	4:20
3.	"Who Lives Next Door"	Arnott, Paul Hyde	4:56
4.	"Love Is Strange"	Arnott, Kromm	4:25
5.	"This Island Earth"	Kromm	4:48
6.	"Hold You"	Arnott	4:33
7.	"Crying in the Ocean"	Arnott	4:17
8.	"Wild Blue"	Arnott, Kromm	4:27
9.	"Rock and Whirl"	Kromm	4:19
10.	"Ultimate Angels"	Arnott, Dawnlea Tait-Arnott	2:27
11.	"Alien Time"	Arnott, Kromm	7:17

=== 2016 reissue bonus tracks ===
No.	Title	Writer(s)	Length
12.	"Love Becomes Electric (extended club mix)"	Kromm	6:11
13.	"Flow My Tears (previously unreleased)"		5:04

== Album credits ==
=== Personnel ===
- Darryl Kromm – Vocals, Guitar, Twelve-string guitar
- Drew Arnott – Vocals, Keyboards, Programming

with:

- Andrew Arnott – Alto Saxophone
- Dawnlea Arnott – Soprano Vocals
- Howard Ayee – Bass, Backing Vocals
- Randy Bachman – Guitar
- Simon Brierley – Guitar
- Ian Cameron – Guitar, Violin
- Greg Critchley – Drums
- Peter Fredette – Backing Vocals
- Matthew Gerrard – Bass
- Kenny Greer – Pedal Steel Guitar
- Allan Holdsworth – Guitar
- Jim Hubay – Guitar
- Joe Primeau – Backing Vocals
- Ed Shaw – Guitar
- Storm – Backing Vocals
- Owen Tennyson – Drums
- Steve Webster – Bass

=== Production ===
- Producers: Drew Arnott, Howard Ayee, Joe Primeau
- Engineers: Joe Primeau, Lenny DeRose
- Mixed by Lenny DeRose
  - except "Who Lives Next Door" mixed by Bob Rock
- Emulator Programming: Billy Chapman
- Additional Programming: Gerald O'Brien, Howard Ayee, Scott Humphries
- Mastered by Bob Ludwig
