= Shallow Water =

Shallow Water may refer to:

- Shallow Water, Kansas, an unincorporated community in Scott County, Kansas, United States
- Shallow Water (album), a 1979 album by Servant
- Shallow Water (film), a 2017 film by Sandy Collora
