= Hammer on a Drum =

Studio album by Payolas
- Released: 1983
- Label: A&M
- Producer: Mick Ronson with Payolas

Payolas chronology
No Stranger to Danger (1982)	Hammer on a Drum (1983)	Here's the World for Ya (1985)

Professional ratings
Review scores
Source	Rating
AllMusic	3/5 stars

Hammer on a Drum is the third album by the Payolas, released in 1983. The title comes from a line in the song "Where Is This Love." The album is only available on vinyl and cassette; it has not been released on CD. The album was #26 for 5 weeks in the Canadian charts.

== Track listing ==
All songs written by Bob Rock and Paul Hyde.

Side One

1. "I'll Find Another (Who Can Do It Right)" – 3:37
2. "Where Is This Love" – 5:54
3. "Wild West" – 3:11
4. "Perhaps Some Day" – 3:30
5. "Never Said I Loved You" – 3:18 (with Carole Pope)-- (#8 Canada)

Side Two

1. "No Prisoners" – 5:16
2. "Christmas Is Coming" – 3:40
3. "I Am A City" – 5:09
4. "Hungry" – 4:10
5. "People Who Have Great Lives" – 2:26

== Personnel ==
- Paul Hyde: lead vocals
- Christopher Livingston: keyboards
- Bob Rock: guitars
- Chris Taylor: drums

with:

- Barry Muir: bass guitar
- Carole Pope: vocals on "Never Said I Loved You"
