= No Stranger to Danger (Payolas album) =

Studio album by Payolas
- Released: 1982
- Label: A&M
- Producer: Mick Ronson

Payolas chronology
In a Place Like This (1981)	No Stranger to Danger (1982)	Hammer on a Drum (1983)

No Stranger to Danger is the second album by Payolas, released in 1982. It contains the hit "Eyes of a Stranger".

The album is only available on vinyl and cassette; it has not been released on CD or as a commercial digital download, although some tracks (notably "Romance" and "Eyes of a Stranger") appear on some compilations. The album reached #5 in Canada, and was #37 in the 1982 Year End chart. "Eyes of a Stranger" reached number 4 in Canadian charts, and was number 34 in the year-end chart.

== Track listing ==
All songs written by Bob Rock and Paul Hyde, except as noted.

1. "Romance" – 3:23
2. "Eyes of a Stranger" – 4:54
3. "Some Old Song" – 3:37
4. "Rose" (written by Paul Hyde) – 3:59
5. "Hastings Street" – 4:59
6. "Youth" – 4:17
7. "Lights to Change" – 2:27
8. "Mystery to Me" – 3:04
9. "Pennies into Gold" – 3:06
10. "Screaming" – 4:09
11. "Rockers" – 2:46

== Personnel ==
- Paul Hyde: vocals, guitars
- Bob Rock: electric/acoustic and synthetic guitars, vocals
- Christopher Taylor: drums, etc.
- Mick Ronson: producer, keyboards, guitar, vocals
- Laurence Wilkins: Bass

== Notes ==
- "Eyes of a Stranger" was covered by P.O.D. on their The Warriors EP, Volume 2 album.
