= List of number-one rock singles of 2006 (Canada) =

The following lists the number one rock singles in Canada in 2006 based on airplay from Mediabase which was published in Radio & Records magazine.

== Chart history ==
Issue date	Song	Artist(s)	Ref.
January 13	"Talk"	Coldplay	
January 20	"Talk"	Coldplay	
January 27	"Talk"	Coldplay	
February 3	"Talk"	Coldplay	
February 10	"Talk"	Coldplay	
February 17	"Talk"	Coldplay	
February 24	"Talk"	Coldplay	
March 3	"The Gate"	Sam Roberts	
March 10	"The Gate"	Sam Roberts	
March 17	"The Gate"	Sam Roberts	
March 24	"The Gate"	Sam Roberts	
March 31	"World Wide Suicide"	Pearl Jam	
April 7	"World Wide Suicide"	Pearl Jam	
April 14	"World Wide Suicide"	Pearl Jam	
April 21	"The Gate"	Sam Roberts	
April 28	"Dani California"	Red Hot Chili Peppers	
May 5	"Dani California"	Red Hot Chili Peppers	
May 12	"Dani California"	Red Hot Chili Peppers	
May 19	"Dani California"	Red Hot Chili Peppers	
May 26	"Dani California"	Red Hot Chili Peppers	
June 2	"Dani California"	Red Hot Chili Peppers	
June 9	"Dani California"	Red Hot Chili Peppers	
June 16	"Dani California"	Red Hot Chili Peppers	
June 23	"Dani California"	Red Hot Chili Peppers	
June 30	"Dani California"	Red Hot Chili Peppers	
July 7	"Dani California"	Red Hot Chili Peppers	
July 14	"Dani California"	Red Hot Chili Peppers	
July 21	"Dani California"	Red Hot Chili Peppers	
July 28	"Dani California"	Red Hot Chili Peppers	
August 4	"Through Glass"	Stone Sour	
August 11	"Through Glass"	Stone Sour	
August 18	"Original Fire"	Audioslave	
August 25	"Original Fire"	Audioslave	
September 1	"Original Fire"	Audioslave	
September 8	"Original Fire"	Audioslave	
September 15	"Original Fire"	Audioslave	
September 22	"Original Fire"	Audioslave	
September 29	"Tell Me Baby"	Red Hot Chili Peppers	
October 6	"In View"	The Tragically Hip	
October 13	"Tell Me Baby"	Red Hot Chili Peppers	
October 20	"In View"	The Tragically Hip	
October 27	"When You Were Young"	The Killers	
November 3	"When You Were Young"	The Killers	
November 10	"When You Were Young"	The Killers	
November 17	"When You Were Young"	The Killers	
November 24	"Pain"	Three Days Grace	
December 1	"Pain"	Three Days Grace	
