= World of Sand =

Studio album by Servant
- Released: 1982
- Genre: Christian rock
- Length: 43:21
- Label: Rooftop
- Producer: Servant, Jim Palosaari

Servant chronology
Rockin' Revival (1981)	World of Sand (1982)	Caught in the Act of Loving Him (1983)

World of Sand is the third album by Servant, released in 1982 on Rooftop Records.

World of Sand was the debut album for Rooftop Records, the new media arm of the Highway Missionary Society (the band's parent organization). The title comes from a line in the last song:

Foundations laid upon this world of sand have all washed away to the sea...

— Come Jesus Come

Stylistically, this album would mark the beginning of a move away from the blues rock/classic rock style of their first two albums, toward the synth-infused new wave styles that would mark their latter works.

== Background ==
The process of creating this album was tragically overshadowed by a devastating accident the summer before:

June 23, 1981 – on just an ordinary summer morning while driving to the dump, a fiery head-on collision abruptly extinguished the lives of three members of our community. We remember and see our three, who continuously celebrate, now and throughout eternity, in the presence of the Lord.

— Susan Palosaari, World of Sand liner notes

In the aftermath of their loss, the band members were able to find some catharsis by channeling their grief into the creation of the 8-minute epic, "Sudden Death". The song begins with the optimism of a new day, then suddenly changes with the confusion and anguish over the accident, closing with acknowledgement of God's power over the situation, quoting 1 Corinthians 15:55 ("O death, where is thy sting?"). Most of the band members contributed to the writing of the song, as well as members of the community, including Susan Palosaari, who lost her son that day.

After the intensity of dealing with "Sudden Death", the album closes with the altar call "Come Jesus Come", in which they proclaim their readiness to re-dedicate themselves even after dealing with such tragedy.

== Critical reception ==
Professional ratings
Review scores
Source	Rating
Cross Rhythms	4.5/5 stars

Upon the reissue on CD, Mike Rimmer of Cross Rhythms said "25 years after it was released, these songs still feel relevant, and it made me wonder why on today's scene there aren't more bands like Servant who used their music to say something spiritually challenging?"

World of Sand was also recognized on the blog "CCM's 500 Best Albums of All Time" at No. 337.

== Artwork, packaging ==
The illustration that graces the front cover is by Orange County artist Kerne Erickson, whose work can also be seen on albums by Sweet Comfort Band (their album Cutting Edge, released the same year, was a good example of their albums featuring cover art by Erickson). The illustration shows a horse and rider galloping away from a city made of sand, about to be washed away to the sea by a large wave of water.

== Reissues ==
After the initial pressing, Rooftop reissued the album in 1983 without the bonus 7" record, but adding the first track ("Cog in the Wheel") to the end of side one.

In 2006, World of Sand was remastered and given its first CD release by Retroactive Records.

== Track listing ==
Side one
No.	Title	Writer(s)	Length
1.	"Two Masters"	Sandie Brock, David Holmes, Owen Brock, Matt Spransy, Bruce Wright; Concept by Jim Palosaari	5:20
2.	"New Revolution"	Holmes, Wright	2:25
3.	"Long Hard Fight"	Wright	3:32
4.	"Jungle Music"	O. Brock, Wright, Spransy; Dialog written by Wright; Spoken by: Livingston – Wright, Stanley – Palosaari	6:00
Total length:			17:17

Side two
No.	Title	Writer(s)	Length
1.	"Wall of Love"	Wright	3:39
2.	"Cheap Talk"	O. Brock, Wright	3:08
3.	"Sudden Death"	Susan Palosaari, S. Brock, O. Brock, Holmes, Jeff Rosas, Spransy, Wright, Doug Pinnick	8:10
4.	"Come Jesus Come" (From the musical "Lonesome Stone"; Acoustic piano: Bruce Wright)	Greg Nancarrow	3:34
Total length:			18:31

Seven inch bonus record (33 1/3 RPM)
No.	Title	Writer(s)	Length
1.	"Cog in the Wheel" (Lead vocal: David Holmes)	Wright	4:41
2.	"Treeplanter Stomp" (Treeplanter yell done by Tim Spransy)	M. Spransy	2:52
Total length:			7:33

== Personnel ==
=== Servant ===
- Sandie Brock – lead vocals, backing vocals
- Bob Hardy – lead vocals, backing vocals
- Matt Spransy – keyboards
- Bruce Wright – lead guitars, spoken word (4)
- Owen Brock – rhythm guitars, backing vocals
- Rob Martens – bass guitar, backing vocals
- David Holmes – drums, backing vocals, lead vocals (9)

=== Additional personnel ===
- Jim Palosaari – spoken word (4)

=== Production ===
- Produced by Servant and Jim Palosaari
- Production help – Jonathan David Brown
- Engineered by Jonathan David Brown and Thom Roy
- Assistant engineer – John Jenkinson
- Recorded at Whitefield Studio (Santa Ana, California)
- Mixed by Jonathan David Brown
- Mastered by Steve Hall at MCA Recording Studios (Glendale, California)
- Album cover painting – Kearney [sic] Erickson (Note: This is a misspelling of the name, but is accurately shown here the way it appeared in the liner notes.)
- Art direction, design and graphics – Owen Brock and Jenny Haas
- Desert photographs by Pete and Flo Hicks

=== Reissue ===
- Remastered by Rev at Creation Station Media
