= Ian Cameron =

Ian Cameron may refer to:

- Ian Cameron (footballer, born 1966), Scottish football player and coach
- Ian Cameron (footballer, born 1988), Scottish football player and coach
- Ian Cameron (politician) (born 1938), Australian retired politician
- Ian Cameron (stockbroker) (1932–2010), father of former British prime minister David Cameron
- Ian Cameron (musician), Canadian fiddler and composer
- Ian Cameron (activist), South African civic activist
- Ian Cameron (car designer) (1950–2024), British car designer
- Ian Officer Cameron, ABC News producer and husband of Susan Rice
- Ian Cameron, pen name of English author Donald G. Payne (1924–2018)

== See also ==
- Eoin Cameron (1951–2016), Australian radio presenter and former politician
- Iain Cameron, Scottish outdoors' expert, author, and snow-patch researcher
- Iain Cameron, character in the TV series Kiss Me Kate
