= Bob Rock =

Canadian record producer (born 1954)

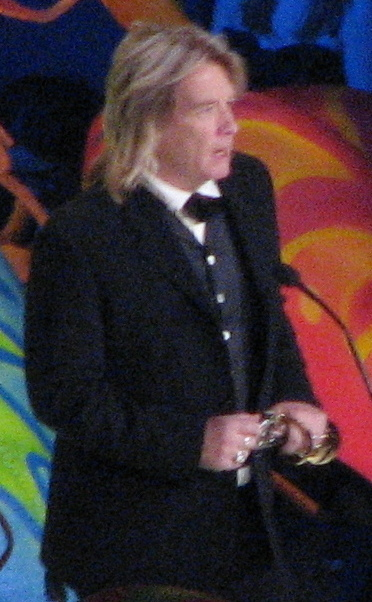
- Rock presenting at the 2009 Juno Awards

Background information
- Born: Robert Jens Rock; April 19, 1954 (age 72); Winnipeg, Manitoba, Canada
- Origin: Vancouver, British Columbia, Canada
- Genres: Rock; heavy metal; punk rock; pop
- Occupations: Record producer; recording engineer; musician
- Instruments: Guitar; bass; keyboards; vocals
- Years active: 1976–present

Robert Jens Rock (born April 19, 1954) is a Canadian record producer, recording engineer, and musician.

In 1976, Rock joined Little Mountain Sound Studios, starting out as a recording engineer and sound mixer. During his time there, he collaborated with producer Bruce Fairbairn, engineering and mixing several influential rock albums, including Loverboy's Get Lucky (1981), Bon Jovi's Slippery When Wet (1986), and Aerosmith's Permanent Vacation (1987).

Rock and singer-songwriter Paul Hyde formed the band Payola$ in 1978. Payola$ were best known for the single "Eyes of a Stranger", from their 1982 album No Stranger to Danger, an album that won the band four Juno Awards. The pair also recorded together in 1987 under the name Rock and Hyde. In 1991, Rock released an album with the band Rockhead.

Some of Rock's most notable works as a producer include the rock albums Dr. Feelgood by Mötley Crüe (1989), the Cult's Sonic Temple (1989), and Metallica's 1991 self-titled album, often referred to as the Black Album. Each of these albums is the top-selling record for its respective band, and Metallica and the Cult each went on to collaborate with Rock on four subsequent albums.

Rock has received twenty-seven Juno Award nominations across various categories. In addition to the four Juno Awards he won for his work with Payola$, he won the Recording Engineer of the Year in 1982, and won the Producer of the Year award in 2000, 2005, and 2010. He was inducted into the Canadian Music Hall of Fame in 2007 and won a Grammy Award for Best Traditional Pop Vocal Album for his work on Michael Bublé's album To Be Loved at the 56th Annual Grammy Awards held in 2014.

== Early life ==
Rock was born in Winnipeg, Manitoba, and moved with his family to Victoria, British Columbia, at 12 years of age. He attended Colquitz Junior High School and played in various bands. He regularly attended all-ages performances at such nightclubs as Club Tango, the Purple Onion, and Ninth in the Fifth. In his early days he was fan of British blues-rock bands such as The Yardbirds, Cream, and Led Zeppelin.

Rock went to Belmont High School located in Langford, a Victoria suburb, and it was there that he met future Payolas bandmate Paul Hyde. Influenced by musical artists such as David Bowie, Slade, T. Rex, Alex Harvey, and Be-Bop Deluxe, the pair formed the Paul Kane Blues Band and toured Vancouver Island in the mid-1970s.

== Production career ==
In 1976, Rock landed a job as an apprentice recording engineer at Little Mountain Sound Studios in Vancouver and became acquainted with Vancouver's punk scene while working on tracks for punk acts, such as the Young Canadians, The Dils, and the Pointed Sticks. In the years that followed, Rock worked with producer Bruce Fairbairn, providing engineering and mixing work on the seminal rock albums Get Lucky (1981) by Loverboy, Bon Jovi's Slippery When Wet (1986), and Aerosmith's Permanent Vacation (1987).

After his work on Permanent Vacation, Rock decided he wanted to move away from audio engineering to focus mainly on music production. Rock told Billboard magazine in 1992, "If I didn't take the next step, I realized I'd be engineering the rest of my life. It's a tough gig, engineering, a lot of hours. I had to move on."

The Cult's Billy Duffy asked Rock to produce their 1989 album Sonic Temple, having admired Rock's work with Bon Jovi and Kingdom Come. The album reached the Cult's highest chart position in both the US and the UK. It also marked a longtime relationship with the band, as Rock went on to produce their albums The Cult (1994), Beyond Good and Evil (2001), Choice of Weapon (2012), and Hidden City (2016). The band's frontman, Ian Astbury, told Billboard in 2000, "[Bob Rock is] pretty much the only person qualified to [produce us]. We're extremely strong-minded people, strong-spirited people. And we both have a very strong vision. And to get between [Billy and me] demands a lot of patience and demands a certain amount of strength. The Cult is a very muscular band; there's a lot of power and determination and spirit and a lot of spark. So, from that fire, somebody that can get a hold of that energy and harness it-and put it in the right direction-is the person that's really qualified to be our producer ... He believes in us probably more than we believe in ourselves."

Mötley Crüe's manager, Doc McGhee, who also managed Bon Jovi, recommended Rock to Mötley Crüe for their first album since getting sober, Dr. Feelgood (1989). The band stayed in Vancouver for close to a year in order to work with Rock. Dr. Feelgood went on to become Mötley Crüe's best-selling album and is the only one to reach the #1 spot on the Billboard 200. The album was nominated for two Grammys for Best Hard Rock Performance and won the American Music Award for best heavy metal/hard rock album in 1991.

Having been impressed by his work on Metallica's self-titled album, Bon Jovi employed Rock to produce their fifth studio album, Keep the Faith (1992). In 1999 plans were made to have Rock and Fairbairn produce their album Crush, but Fairbairn died later that year and the banded opted to work with Luke Ebbin.

In 1995, Rock relocated to Maui and converted part of his home into his own private music production facility, known as Plantation Studios, three years later. In the 2000s, Rock's production work began to center around his home studio, although he traveled to work on larger projects, such as Metallica's St. Anger. Rock told The Honolulu Advertiser in 2003, "Actually, over the next few years I'm probably going to be weaning myself off of what I do a little bit... And I would really love to be able to get involved more with local music."

While Rock is best known for his work with rock and metal artists, Rock has produced such pop artists as Cher, Nelly Furtado, Jann Arden, Sarah McLachlan, and Michael Bublé. His work with Bublé on the album To Be Loved (2013) earned him a Grammy Award.

=== Work with Metallica ===
Metallica were fans of Rock's work on Dr. Feelgood and asked him to produce their fifth studio album, Metallica, commonly referred to as The Black Album.

The album marked a departure from the band's earlier thrash metal sound and expanded the band's range, at times featuring a slower, softer and more introspective sound, such as on the ballad "The Unforgiven", or on "Nothing Else Matters", which featured acoustic guitar. These two songs also offered new vocal territory for James Hetfield, whose previous albums mainly showcased harder, more aggressive vocals. Rock told MusicRadar in 2013 "The thing was, James had songs that he actually had to sing... He didn't know how to sing – all he did before was yell. This was the basis of our friendship. I taught him what I knew. We took the time to get the record to what they wanted and what I wanted."

Until Metallica, the band members were used to recording their parts separately, which were later mixed together. Rock and recording engineer Randy Staub convinced the band to record the lead single "Enter Sandman" while all four performed in the same room. Rock's son provided the voice of the child reciting the "Now I Lay Me Down to Sleep" bedtime prayer in the song.

Metallica debuted in the #1 spot on the Billboard 200 and won the Grammy Award for Best Metal Performance at the 34th Annual Grammy Awards. In December 2019, it became the fourth album in American history to enter the 550-week milestone on the Billboard 200. In 1999, SPIN magazine ranked it at #52 on their list of "The 90 Greatest Albums of the 90s"; it was ranked at #25 on Rolling Stone magazine's "100 Greatest Metal Albums of All Time" in 2017, as well as #235 on Rolling Stone's 2020 list of "The 500 Greatest Albums of All Time."

Rock went on to produce the band's albums Load (1996), ReLoad (1997), as well as the new material for the band's cover album, Garage Inc. (1998), and their album St. Anger (2003). Rock wrote and played all of the bass guitar parts on St. Anger, following the departure of Jason Newsted in 2001. Rock was also the bassist for the band's few live performances until Robert Trujillo joined the band in February 2003. Rock was featured prominently in the 2004 documentary film Metallica: Some Kind of Monster that dealt with Metallica's internal strife and their struggles with the creative process during the recording of St. Anger.

In 2006, Metallica chose producer Rick Rubin to produce their ninth studio album, Death Magnetic, ending the band's long-time relationship with Rock. Their decision to part ways with Rock was due in part to requests by their fan base, who had posted an online petition with over 1,500 signatories who felt that Rock had too much influence over the band's sound.

At Metallica's 30th Anniversary Concert on December 10, 2011, Rock joined the band on stage, and performed bass alongside Trujillo on the songs "Dirty Window" and "Frantic".

== Payola$ and Rock and Hyde ==
After being hired by Little Mountain Sound Studios in 1976, Paul Hyde followed Rock to Vancouver and in 1978 they formed Payola$. Hyde was the band's vocalist, Rock played guitar. Rock and Hyde were the only mainstays over the band's history, having changed bassists and drummers several times.

The band released their first single, "China Boys", in 1979, and attracted the attention of A&M Records. A year later their four track EP Introducing Payola$ was released by A&M. The band released the album In a Place Like This in 1981. The album was produced by Rock, and was a critical success, but didn't do well commercially.

The band attracted the attention of famed British songwriter and producer Mick Ronson, who produced Payola$'s 1982 album No Stranger to Danger. The album included the hit single "Eyes of a Stranger", which won the Juno Award for best single. Junos were also given to Rock and Hyde for their songwriting, Rock was awarded Recording Engineer of the Year, and the band as a whole won Most Promising Group.

In 1987, the band (who had by then changed their name to Paul Hyde and the Payolas) again changed their name to Rock and Hyde and had two hit singles in Canada with the song "Dirty Water", which made it to #20 on the RPM Hot 100 chart, and "I Will", which peaked at #40. In 2007, the Payolas became briefly active once more as a touring and recording act, releasing the EP Langford Part One.

== Other musical projects ==
In 1991, Rock formed the band Rockhead with ex-Payolas drummer Chris Taylor. The band released one self-titled album in 1992 and two singles before splitting up.

Rock produced the five finalist songs of CBC Sports's Hockey Night in Canada Anthem Challenge in late 2008.

Between 2009 and 2016, Rock worked sporadically on recording sessions with vocalist Gord Downie. Their collaboration Lustre Parfait was released in 2023, five years after Downie's death. Downie sang and wrote the lyrics for all songs on the album. Rock wrote the music, played guitar and produced the tracks, in addition to providing backing vocals plus some keyboards and percussion. Rock was profoundly impacted by Downie's death in 2017 and took a break from the project for several years.

== Benefit and charity work ==
In 1985, producer and songwriter David Foster helped assemble the supergroup, Northern Lights, to record the song "Tears Are Not Enough" to raise funds for relief of the 1983–1985 famine in Ethiopia. Hyde was one of over 50 musicians featured on the song and Rock served as one of the engineers. Rock and Hyde came up with the song's title and contributed to the French lyrics along with Rachel Paiement.

Rock executive-produced the album the 2005 War Child benefit album Help!: A Day in the Life. The album included the Payolas track "At Angels Feet" and the band performed at the One X One child poverty benefit gala in Toronto the following year.

== Awards ==
Rock has been nominated for 27 Juno Awards in various categories over his career, including "Recording Engineer of the Year", "Composer of the Year", and "Producer of the Year". He has won nine Junos for both his work with Payola$ and Rock and Hyde, as well as his recording and production work with other artists.

At the 2007 Juno Awards ceremony, he was inducted into the Canadian Music Hall of Fame by the Canadian Academy of Recording Arts and Sciences (CARAS) for his lifetime contribution to popular music.

In 2014, Rock won a Grammy Award for Best Traditional Pop Vocal Album for his work on Michael Bublé's album To Be Loved.

=== Juno Awards ===
The Juno Awards are awarded annually to Canadian musicians by the Canadian Academy of Recording Arts and Sciences.

| Year | Nominated work | Award | Result |
|---|---|---|---|
| 1982 | "When It's Over", "It's Your Life" by Loverboy | Recording Engineer of the Year | Won |
| 1983 | No Stranger to Danger by Payola$ | Recording Engineer of the Year | Won |
| 1983 | Worlds Away by Strange Advance | Recording Engineer of the Year | Nominated |
| 1983 | Payola$ | Most Promising Group of the Year | Won |
| 1983 | Eyes of a Stranger by Payola$ | Composer of the Year | Won |
| 1983 | Eyes of a Stranger by Payola$ | Single of the Year | Won |
| 1984 | Payola$ | Group of the Year | Nominated |
| 1984 | Hammer on a Drum by Payola$ | Album of the Year | Nominated |
| 1987 | "Wanted Dead or Alive" & "Livin' on a Prayer" by Bon Jovi | Recording Engineer of the Year | Nominated |
| 1987 | Bob Rock and Paul Hyde | Composer of the Year | Nominated |
| 1987 | Rock and Hyde | Group of the Year | Nominated |
| 1987 | Bob Rock and Paul Hyde | Canadian Entertainer of the Year | Nominated |
| 1989 | "Bad Medicine" by Bon Jovi | Recording Engineer of the Year | Nominated |
| 1990 | Dr. Feelgood by Mötley Crüe & Blue Murder by Blue Murder | Producer of the Year | Nominated |
| 1992 | "Enter Sandman" by Metallica & "Primal Scream" by Mötley Crüe | Producer of the Year | Nominated |
| 1993 | "Bed of Roses" & "Keep the Faith" by Bon Jovi | Producer of the Year | Nominated |
| 2000 | "She's So High" & "If You Sleep" by Tal Bachman | Producer of the Year | Won |
| 2001 | "Spy" & "Just Another Phase" by The Moffatts | Producer of the Year | Nominated |
| 2002 | "Flavor of the Weak" by American Hi-Fi & "Make It Right" by Econoline Crush | Producer of the Year | Nominated |
| 2003 | "Somewhere Out There" by Our Lady Peace & "Take Me As I Am" by Tonic | Producer of the Year | Nominated |
| 2005 | "Welcome to My Life" & "Me Against The World" by Simple Plan | Recording Engineer of the Year | Nominated |
| 2005 | "Welcome to My Life" by Simple Plan & "Some Kind Of Monster" by Metallica | Producer of the Year | Won |
| 2007 | "In View" & "World Container" by The Tragically Hip | Producer of the Year | Nominated |
| 2007 | Bob Rock | Canadian Music Hall of Fame | Won |
| 2008 | "Everything" by Michael Bublé & "Bomb" by Payola$ | Producer of the Year | Nominated |
| 2010 | "Haven't Met You Yet" & "Baby (You've Got What It Takes)" by Michael Bublé | Producer of the Year | Won |
| 2012 | "Only the Lonely" on Uncover Me 2 by Jann Arden | Producer of the Year | Nominated |

=== Grammy Award ===
The Grammy Awards were established in 1958 by the National Academy of Recording Arts and Sciences of the United States awarding the best in the music industry.

| Year | Nominated work | Award | Result |
|---|---|---|---|
| 2013 | To Be Loved by Michael Bublé | Best Traditional Pop Vocal Album (a joint award with Michael Bublé) | Won |

== Personal life ==
For much of his music career, Rock lived in White Rock, British Columbia. In 1995, he moved with his wife and children to Maui, Hawaii, where he established his own recording studio, Plantation Studios. Rock has six children, two boys and four girls.

== Discography ==
=== Musician ===
- Payolas – In a Place Like This (1981)
- Payolas – No Stranger to Danger (1982)
- Strange Advance – Worlds Away (1982)
- Payolas – Hammer on a Drum (1983)
- Paul Hyde & The Payolas – Here's the World for Ya (1985)
- Zappacosta – A to Z (1986)
- Rock and Hyde – Under the Volcano (1987)
- Mötley Crüe – Dr. Feelgood (1989)
- Rockhead – Rockhead (1992)
- Metallica – St. Anger (2003)
- Gord Downie – Lustre Parfait (2023)
- The Offspring – Supercharged (2024)

=== Producer ===
- 1979 – Young Canadians – Hawaii (EP)
- 1979 – The Subhumans – Death Was Too Kind (EP)
- 1980 – Pointed Sticks – Perfect Youth
- 1981 – Payolas – In a Place Like This
- 1984 – Servant – Light Maneuvers
- 1986 – Zappacosta – A to Z
- 1986 – The Cheer – Shot with Our Own Guns
- 1987 – Rock and Hyde – Under the Volcano
- 1988 – Kingdom Come – Kingdom Come
- 1988 – Colin James
- 1989 – The Cult – Sonic Temple
- 1989 – Blue Murder – Blue Murder
- 1989 – Mötley Crüe – Dr. Feelgood
- 1989 – Loverboy – Big Ones (new material)
- 1990 – Little Caesar – Little Caesar
- 1990 – Electric Boys – Funk 'o Metal Carpet Ride
- 1991 – David Lee Roth – A Little Ain't Enough
- 1991 – Metallica – Metallica (The Black Album)
- 1991 – Mötley Crüe – Decade of Decadence (new material)
- 1992 – Cher – Love Hurts
- 1992 – Bon Jovi – Keep the Faith
- 1992 – Rockhead – Rockhead
- 1993 – Quireboys – Bitter Sweet & Twisted
- 1994 – Mötley Crüe – Mötley Crüe
- 1994 – The Cult – The Cult
- 1995 – Skid Row – Subhuman Race
- 1996 – Metallica – Load
- 1997 – Metallica – Reload
- 1997 – Veruca Salt – Eight Arms to Hold You
- 1998 – Metallica – Garage Inc. (Disc 1)
- 1998 – Bryan Adams – On a Day Like Today
- 1998 – Mötley Crüe – Greatest Hits (new material)
- 1999 – Tal Bachman
- 1999 – Metallica – S&M
- 2000 – Sins of the Fallen Son – The Raven
- 2000 – Nina Gordon – Tonight and the Rest of My Life
- 2000 – Paul Hyde – Living off the Radar
- 2000 – Metallica – "I Disappear"
- 2000 – The Moffatts – Submodalities
- 2001 – American Hi-Fi – American Hi-Fi
- 2001 – Antifreez – The Sunshine Daisies
- 2001 – The Cult – Beyond Good and Evil
- 2001 – Econoline Crush – Brand New History
- 2002 – Our Lady Peace – Gravity
- 2002 – Tonic – Head on Straight
- 2003 – Metallica – St. Anger
- 2004 – The Tea Party – Seven Circles
- 2004 – Simple Plan – Still Not Getting Any...
- 2005 – Mötley Crüe – Red, White & Crüe (new material)
- 2005 – Our Lady Peace – Healthy in Paranoid Times
- 2006 – Nina Gordon – Bleeding Heart Graffiti
- 2006 – Lostprophets – Liberation Transmission
- 2006 – Joan Jett & the Blackhearts – Sinner
- 2006 – The Tragically Hip – World Container
- 2007 – Payolas – Langford Part 1
- 2007 – Michael Bublé – Call Me Irresponsible
- 2008 – Gavin Rossdale – Wanderlust
- 2008 – The Offspring – Rise and Fall, Rage and Grace
- 2008 – The Sessions – The Sessions Is Listed as In a Relationship
- 2008 – D.O.A – Northern Avenger
- 2009 – The Tragically Hip – We Are the Same
- 2009 – 311 – Uplifter
- 2009 – Art Bergmann – Lost Art Bergmann
- 2009 – Michael Bublé – Crazy Love
- 2010 – Michael Bublé – Crazy Love (Hollywood Edition)
- 2010 – American Bang – American Bang
- 2011 – Sins of the Fallen Son – End Time
- 2011 – 311 – Universal Pulse
- 2011 – Bush – The Sea of Memories
- 2011 – Jann Arden – Uncover Me 2
- 2011 – Michael Bublé – Christmas
- 2011 – Ron Sexsmith – Long Player Late Bloomer
- 2012 – The Cult – Choice of Weapon
- 2012 – Loverboy – Rock 'n' Roll Revival
- 2012 – The Offspring – Days Go By
- 2012 – Nelly Furtado – The Spirit Indestructible
- 2013 – Michael Bublé – To Be Loved
- 2014 – Black Veil Brides – Black Veil Brides IV
- 2014 – Sarah McLachlan – Shine On
- 2014 – Jann Arden – Everything Almost
- 2014 – Bryan Adams – Tracks of My Years
- 2015 – The Offspring – Coming for You (Single)
- 2016 – The Cult – Hidden City
- 2017 – Bush – Black and White Rainbows
- 2018 – Jann Arden – These Are the Days
- 2018 – RSO (Richie Sambora and Orianthi) – Radio Free America
- 2019 – Bryan Adams – Shine a Light
- 2019 – Mötley Crüe – The Dirt
- 2021 – The Damn Truth – Now or Nowhere
- 2021 – The Offspring – Let the Bad Times Roll
- 2024 – Mötley Crüe – Cancelled (EP)
- 2024 – The Offspring – Supercharged
- 2025 – The Damn Truth - The Damn Truth

=== Engineer/mixer ===
- 1979 – Prism – Armageddon
- 1979 – Survivor – Survivor
- 1979 – Servant – Shallow Water
- 1980 – Private Lines – Trouble in School – assistant engineer
- 1980 – Prism – Young and Restless
- 1980 – Loverboy – Loverboy
- 1980 – Modernettes – Teen City
- 1981 – Servant – Rockin' Revival
- 1981 – Loverboy – Get Lucky
- 1982 – Strange Advance – Worlds Away
- 1982 – Payolas – No Stranger to Danger
- 1983 – Loverboy – Keep it Up
- 1983 – Payolas – Hammer on a Drum
- 1984 – Krokus – The Blitz
- 1984 – Sins of the Fallen Son – The Raven
- 1984 – Chilliwack – Look in Look Out
- 1985 – Paul Hyde and the Payolas – Here's the World for Ya
- 1985 – Northern Lights – "Tears Are Not Enough"
- 1985 – Black 'n Blue – Without Love
- 1986 – Zappacosta – A to Z
- 1986 – Honeymoon Suite – The Big Prize
- 1986 – Paul Janz – Electricity
- 1986 – Bon Jovi – Slippery When Wet
- 1987 – Rock and Hyde – Under the Volcano
- 1987 – Loverboy – Wildside
- 1987 – Aerosmith – Permanent Vacation
- 1988 – Bon Jovi – New Jersey
- 1989 – Paul Dean – Hard Core
- 2022 – Kirk Hammett – Portals

== See also ==
- Music of Canada
- Canadian Music Hall of Fame

| Preceded by Jason Newsted | Metallica bassist 2001–03 | Succeeded by Robert Trujillo |
