= Worlds Away (Strange Advance album) =

Studio album by Strange Advance
- Released: November 1982
- Recorded: February–May 1982; August 1982
- Studio: Little Mountain Sound Studios; Mushroom Studios in Vancouver, British Columbia
- Genre: Rock, new wave
- Label: Capitol
- Producer: Bruce Fairbairn

Strange Advance chronology
Worlds Away (1982)	2WO (1985)

Singles from Worlds Away
- 1. "She Controls Me" Released: 1982; 2. "Kiss in the Dark" Released: 1983; 3. "Love Games" Released: 1983; 4. "Worlds Away" Released: 1983

Professional ratings
Review scores
Source	Rating
Allmusic	4.5/5 stars

Worlds Away is the debut studio album by Canadian new wave band Strange Advance, released November 1982. It featured two hit Canadian singles, "She Controls Me" and "Kiss in the Dark". Strange Advance was subsequently nominated for a Juno Award for Most Promising Group of the Year in 1983.

The 7" single for "She Controls Me" contains a b-side track called "Lost in Your Eyes" which was later released on the Over 60 Minutes with... Strange Advance compilation.

Tomas Mureika of AllMusic calls this album one of Canada's most underrated new wave debut releases.

Four singles were released from this album, not including a dance mix of "Love Games" which was a club hit in England.

According to a 2000 e-mail exchange with keyboardist Drew Arnott, Worlds Away was performed with Yamaha CS-80, Roland Jupiter-8, and Mellotron M400 synthesizers. Drums were performed with a Roland TR-808 augmented by live tom-toms and cymbals.

== Track listing ==
Top side
No.	Title	Writer(s)	Length
1.	"She Controls Me"	Drew Arnott, Darryl Kromm	2:56
2.	"Love Games"	Arnott	3:47
3.	"One Chance in a Million"	Arnott	4:11
4.	"Sister Radio"	Kromm	5:20
5.	"Automatic Sighs"	Arnott, Kromm	4:38

Bottom side
No.	Title	Writer(s)	Length
6.	"Worlds Away"	Arnott	7:01
7.	"Kiss in the Dark"	Arnott, Kromm	3:54
8.	"Hold on to the Nite"	Arnott	4:30
9.	"Watermusic"	Robert Minden	0:54
10.	"Prisoner"	Peter Bjerring, Kromm	4:14
11.	"Worlds Away (Reprise)" (unlisted track)	Arnott	1:11

== Album credits ==
=== Personnel ===
- Darryl Kromm - lead vocals, guitar
- Drew Arnott - keyboards, drums, backing vocals, electronic percussion
- Paul Iverson - bass, backing vocals
- Robert Minden - waterphones
- Paul Dean - guitar on Prisoner
- Bob Rock - rhythm guitar on Prisoner
- Dawnlea Tait - backing backing vocals and voice over on Hold on to the Night
- James McCulloch - additional guitar on Automatic Sighs
- Peter Bjerring - piano on Worlds Away
- Bryan Adams - additional backing vocals on She Controls Me
- Bruce Fairbairn - assorted backing vocals

=== Production ===
- Bruce Fairbairn - producer
- Bob Rock - engineer
- Lindsay Kidd - engineer

== Footnotes ==
=== References ===
- Discogs.com - Worlds Away entry
