= Rockhead =

- Rockhead (1993)

Background information
- Origin: Vancouver, British Columbia, Canada
- Genres: Hard rock
- Years active: 1991–1993
- Label: Capitol

Rockhead was a Canadian hard rock music group formed in 1991 in Vancouver by Bob Rock.

== History ==
Already a well-established music producer, guitarist Bob Rock formed the group in 1991 with his Payola$ and Rock and Hyde bandmate, drummer Chris Taylor, as well as vocalist Steve Jack and bassist Jamey Koch. Jack and Koch, as well as keyboardist John Webster, were all local Vancouver, British Columbia musicians. Their debut single was called "Heartland". Rock produced the band's debut effort, which was released on Capitol Records in 1992. Members of Bon Jovi, The Cult, and Little Caesar guested on the album. The singles "Bed of Roses" and "Chelsea Rose" followed, as did a tour supporting Bon Jovi. However, the album did not sell well, and soon after the group disbanded and Rock returned to his career in production.

== Members ==
- Steve Jack - lead vocals, harmonica
- Bob Rock - guitars, backing vocals
- Jamey Koch - bass, acoustic guitar, backing vocals
- John Webster - keyboards, hammond organ, piano, backing vocals
- Chris Taylor - drums

Touring members

- David "Ziggy" Sigmund - guitars (died: 2022)

Session members

- Billy Duffy - guitar (also tour guest)
- Richie Sambora - guitar
- Jimmy "Apache" Hayne - guitar
- Kenny Greer - pedal steel guitar, slide guitar
- Marc LaFrance - backing vocals
- David Steele - backing vocals
- Scott Humphrey - programming

== Discography ==
- Rockhead (Capitol Records, 1992)
