= Shallow Water (album) =

Studio album by Servant
- Released: 1979
- Genre: Christian rock
- Label: Tunesmith
- Producer: Bob Brooks

Servant chronology
Shallow Water (1979)	Rockin' Revival (1981)

Shallow Water is the debut album by Servant, and also served to launch the new label Tunesmith Records in 1979. The gatefold jacket opened to reveal a photo of the cover scene (people, furniture and all) being washed away in the tide. The album was originally issued in Canada on red vinyl, but later pressings were in standard black.

In 2006, Shallow Water was reissued on CD by Retroactive Records.

== Track listing ==
Top Side
No.	Title	Writer(s)	Lead vocals	Length
1.	"Shallow Water"	Bruce Wright	Sandie	5:05
2.	"Rich Man" (Montrose cover)	Dan Hartman (Note: Both the original LP and CD reissue incorrectly attribute authorship to Sammy Hagar, who had already left Montrose prior to their 1976 recording of this song on the album Jump on It.)	David	3:45
3.	"Here Comes David"	Wright	Sandie & Bob	3:34
4.	"Rejoice" (from the musical Because I Am)	Joe Grier, David Eden	Sandie	4:22
5.	"Jesus Star"	Wright	Bob	3:32

Bottom Side
No.	Title	Writer(s)	Lead vocals	Length
1.	"Water Grave (Note: Liner notes for both the original LP and CD reissue identify this song as "Water Grave," while the back covers of both identify it as "Watergrave." The earlier recording of the song by The Imperials, on their album Sail On, has the title given as "Water Grave.")"	Steven Chapman	Bob	4:52
2.	"Cup of Water"	Owen Brock, Sandra Brock	Sandie & Bob	4:52
3.	"Holy Roller Blues"	Wright	Bruce (Note: Bruce Wright did not sing lead on any other Servant track, and his vocal here is an exaggerated joke vocal rather than a serious one.)	3:32
4.	"Fly Away"	Brady Carbol	Sandie	3:52

== Credits ==
Musicians

- Sandie Brock – lead vocals, piano, synthesizers, percussion
- Bob Hardy – lead vocals, percussion
- Bruce Wright — lead guitar, backing and lead vocals, piano, synthesizers
- Owen Brock — rhythm guitar, backing vocals
- Rob Martens - bass, backing vocals
- David Holmes – drums, backing and lead vocals

Production

- Producer: Bob Brooks
- Engineer: Bob Rock
- Assistant Engineer: Pat Glover (credited on reissue to Mike Fraser)
- Studio: Little Mountain Sound Studios
- Album cover concept: Owen Brock & Jim Palosaari
- Reissue Executive Producer: Matthew Hunt
