= Here's the World for Ya =

Studio album by Paul Hyde and the Payolas
- Released: 1985
- Label: A&M
- Producer: David Foster

Paul Hyde and the Payolas chronology
Hammer on a Drum (1983)	Here's the World for Ya (1985)	Under the Volcano (1987)

Here's the World for Ya is the fourth album by Paul Hyde and the Payolas, the band previously known as Payolas. Released in 1985, the album is only available on vinyl and cassette; it has not been released on CD. The album was #26 in Canada for 2 weeks.

This album was the only Payolas album produced by David Foster, who had been hired to bolster the band's commercial appeal. While promoting the record in 1985, Bob Rock claimed that "[Foster] didn't take us anywhere we didn't already want to go. Even if David hadn't produced this record, I think it still would have had a more professional sheen than our other albums, because that's what we wanted."

Subsequent to this album's release (and A&M's decision to drop the band from that label), the group re-branded themselves as "Rock and Hyde". The liner notes of Rock and Hyde's only LP, Under the Volcano, tell a different story about the band's opinion of Foster's work on this album: "A very special thanks to our producer, Bruce Fairbairn who, risking sanity, did the decent thing and let us be ourselves (we can all look in the mirror in the morning now) and that's the way it should be!"

== Track listing ==
No.	Title	Writer(s)	Length
1.	"Stuck In The Rain"	Bob Rock, Paul Hyde	3:50
2.	"You're The Only Love"	Rock, David Foster, Hyde, Miriam Nelson	4:08
3.	"It Won't Be You"	Rock, Hyde, Foster, Bryan Adams, Jim Vallance	4:13
4.	"Cruel Hearted Lovers"	Rock, Hyde, Nelson	4:24
5.	"It Must Be Love"	Rock, Hyde, Nelson	4:38
6.	"Little Boys"	Rock, Hyde	4:28
7.	"All That I Want"	Rock, Hyde	4:06
8.	"Here's The World"	Rock, Foster, Hyde, Nelson	4:27
9.	"Rhythm Slaves"	Rock, Hyde	4:28
10.	"Never Leave This Place"	Rock, Hyde	4:10

Singles

- "You're The Only Love" -- (#26 Canada for 2 weeks)
- "Stuck In The Rain" -- (#77 Canada for 3 weeks)
- "Here's The World" -- (#91 Canada)
- "It Must Be Love" -- (#94 Canada)

== Personnel ==
Paul Hyde and the Payolas

- Paul Hyde - vocals
- Bob Rock - guitars
- Alex "A-Train" Boynton - bass
- Chris Taylor - drums

with:

- David Foster - keyboards and backing vocals
- Christopher Livingston - keyboards
- Steve Porcaro - synth program
- Christopher Allen - harmonica
- Mark Rousseau - saxophone
- Richard Marx - backing vocals
- Paul Janz - backing vocals
- Henri Lorieau - backing vocals
- Sugar Jones - backing vocals
- Mark Lafrance - backing vocals
- Todd Smallwood - backing vocals
