= In a Place Like This =

Studio album by Payolas
- Released: 1981
- Recorded: January–February 1981
- Studios: Le Studio, Little Mountain Sound Company
- Label: A&M
- Producer: Bob Rock

Payolas chronology
Introducing Payola$ (1980)	In a Place Like This (1981)	No Stranger to Danger (1982)

In a Place Like This is the debut album by Canadian rock band Payolas, released in 1981. It was produced by Bob Rock. The band supported the album with a Canadian tour that included shows with ZZ Top.

== Critical reception ==
Professional ratings
Review scores
Source	Rating
AllMusic	3/5 stars

The Boston Globe wrote: "Payolas are a solid, competent band whose hard-driving punkish pop and socially conscious lyrics recall music made three years ago by the Clash and the Boomtown Rats. Although they make a valiant attempt at becoming another major new wave voice, Payolas fall a bit short, mainly because they aren't quite as good as either of the bands they sound like." Trouser Press opined that the album "is political (but not preachy), offering sophisticated punk with reggae seasoning, which makes it again reminiscent of the Clash without being derivative."

== Track listing ==
No.	Title	Writer(s)	Length
1.	"In a Place Like This"	Hyde	3:56
2.	"I'm Sorry"	Rock, Hyde	3:00
3.	"Jukebox"	Rock, Hyde	3:12
4.	"Whiskey Boy"	Rock, Hyde	2:15
5.	"Good Job"	Rock, Hyde	3:18
6.	"You Can't Walk Away"	Rock, Hyde	3:24
7.	"Too Shy to Dance"	Rock, Hyde, Wilkins	3:12
8.	"Hot Tonight"	Rock, Hyde	3:57
9.	"Female Hands"	Hyde	4:15
10.	"Comfortable"	Hyde	2:45
11.	"China Boys"	Rock, Hyde	3:19

== Personnel ==
- Paul Hyde: vocals, rhythm guitar
- Bob Rock: guitars, vocals
- Lawrence Wilkins: bass
- Taylor Nelson Little: drums
- Lee Kelsey: keyboards, vocals
