= Gibson Chet Atkins SST =

Steel-string semi-acoustic guitar

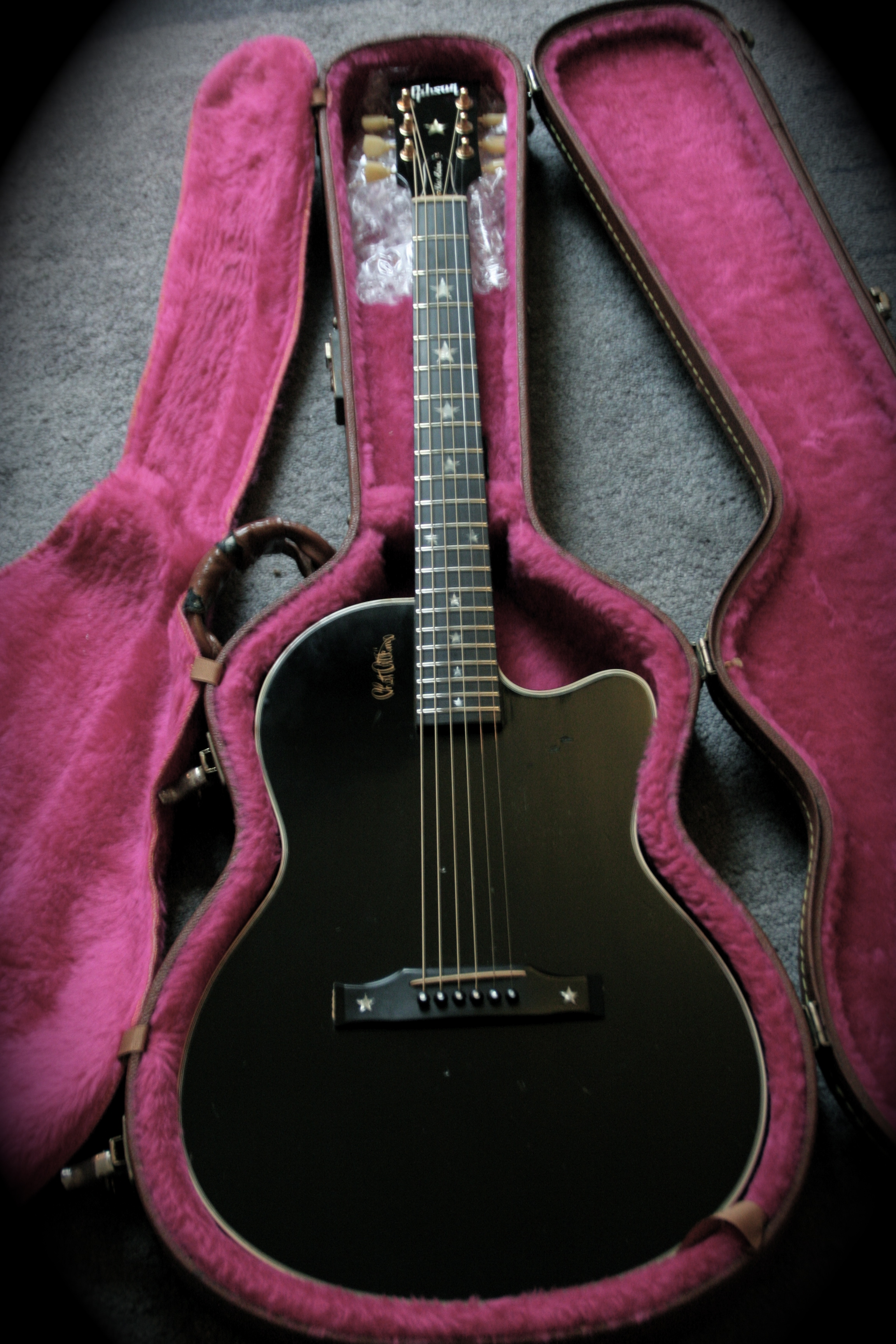
- Gibson Chet Atkins SST in ebony color
- Manufacturer: Gibson
- Period: 1987–2006

Woods
- Body: Mahogany

Colors available
- Natural, ebony, white, burgundy, cherry

The Gibson Chet Atkins SST was a solid body acoustic-electric designed by the musician Chet Atkins and manufactured and marketed by Gibson. The steel-string model was introduced in 1987 and was discontinued in 2006. The Chet Atkins CE was the original nylon string version of 1982 and possibly the first of its kind.

== Design ==
The SST was a design that combined Gibson's steel-string acoustic and electric guitar technology.

The guitar had a solid spruce or cedar top and a mahogany body. Unlike most acoustic-electrics, the SST had no resonating chamber or soundhole. The acoustic sound came from a bridge mounted transducer manufactured by L.R. Baggs for Gibson with a proprietary active pre-amp. The SST had controls for volume as well as boost and cut for both treble and bass signals.

The SST was offered in five finishes: natural, ebony, white, burgundy and cherry sunburst. It had mother of pearl inlays on the fretboard, headstock, and bridge and features gold plated hardware. Early models had an ornate headstock and a fake sound hole with the knobs mounted on the front of the guitar. Later models had star inlays and a Les Paul style headstock. It also sports Chet Atkins's signature above the fretboard.

== Popular use ==
The SST quickly became popular among rock and country players because high volume levels could be reached without any feedback, whereas most traditional acoustic electrics will emit moderate to high levels of feedback when they come near amplifiers, speakers or microphones. This ability made the SST suitable acoustic guitar for live music.

== Notable SST Players ==
- Chet Atkins
- Waylon Jennings
- David Crowder
- Keziah Jones
- Lindsey Buckingham
- Johnny Marr
- Emerson Hart
- Patricia Kelly
- Mark Knopfler
- Tonino Baliardo
- Dave Matthews
- Jorma Kaukonen
- Keller Williams
- John Bell
- David Gilmour
- Steve Earle
- Raine Maida
- Sammy Patrick
- Emmylou Harris
- Clint Black
- Joe Diffie
- Travis Tritt
- Zakk Wylde
- Janick Gers
- Moraes Moreira
- Robert Smith
- Joaquín Sabina
- Charlie Daniels
- Erin McKeown
- Flemming Lyse
- John Rzeznik
- Johnny Madsen
- Edwin McCain
- Brian Molko
