= Eyes of a Stranger (Payolas song) =

Single by Payolas

from the album No Stranger to Danger
- B-side: "Soldier"
- Released: 1982
- Label: A&M
- Songwriters: Bob Rock and Paul Hyde
- Producer: Mick Ronson

"Eyes of a Stranger" is a song by Payolas, written by Bob Rock and Paul Hyde and produced by Mick Ronson for the album No Stranger to Danger. It reached No. 4 on the Canadian RPM chart in August 1982. The song received a Juno award for Single of the Year.

== Charts ==
| Chart (1982) | Peak position |
|---|---|
| Australian Charts | 81 |
| Canadian RPM Singles Chart | 4 |
| US Top Rock Tracks | 22 |

== Awards ==
The song received multiple Juno awards, including Single of the Year.

== Legacy ==
The song appeared on the multi-artist compilation album Oh What a Feeling: A Vital Collection of Canadian Music and on the Valley Girl movie soundtrack, as well as on Between a Rock and a Hyde Place: The Best of Payola$. It was additionally used in the Miami Vice Season 4 episode "Badge of Dishonor" and in the 2026 film The Backrooms.

Two cover versions of the song have included recordings by P.O.D. on The Warriors EP, Volume 2 and by Dirty Ghosts. The Payolas' "Eyes of a Stranger" was included on The Georgia Straight's 2017 list of the best 50 songs to come out of Vancouver.

== Credits ==
The song was written by Bob Rock and Paul Hyde. It was produced by Mick Ronson for the album No Stranger to Danger.
