= Langford (Part One) =

Langford Part One

EP by Payolas
- Released: July 2007
- Recorded: Plantation Studios, Maui & The Warehouse Studios, Vancouver, BC
- Genre: Rock
- Length: 26:34
- Label: EMI
- Producer: Jens (aka Bob Rock) with Jamey Koch and Eric Helmkamp

Payolas chronology
Under the Volcano (1987)	Langford Part One (2007)

Professional ratings
Review scores
Source	Rating
Times Colonist	3/5 stars

Langford Part One is the seven-song CD EP released by the Payolas in 2007.

The album cover features a picture of the Belmont Secondary School which is the Langford, British Columbia high school that Bob Rock and Paul Hyde attended together.

The band announced plans for a full-length album in 2008 that would combine the songs on this EP with several newer songs. However, the proposed full-length album project never materialized—although one newly recorded track from it ("Shark Attack") was released as a download from the Payolas' website in 2008. It is unknown as to whether any other tracks were recorded for the full length-album project before the Payolas ceased operations in 2008, and shut down their site in 2009.

== Track listing ==
All songs written by Paul Hyde and Bob Rock except as indicated

1. "Bomb" – 3:10
2. "Revolution" – 3:25
3. "Phone Hell" – 5:58
4. "We are Failing" (Paul Hyde, Bob Rock, David Nelson) – 3:47
5. "At the Angel's Feet" – 4:18
6. "Goodbye to Rock N Roll" – 3:00
7. "Revolution Jam-up" – 2:52

== Personnel ==
- Paul Hyde: vocals
- Bob Rock: all guitars, all instruments except as indicated

with:

- Chris Weiss: bass on 3 and 5
- Jamie Edwards: keyboards on 3 and 5
- Jeremy Taggart: drums on 3
- Sean Nelson: drums on 5
- Dani Nelson, Lizzy Nelson, Lynn Collar, Anne Drennan, Bob Krieger, Pete McCormack, Luke Napier, Kevin Dubois: choir vocals on 1
- David Nelson (Emotionz): spoken/rap vocal on 4 and 7
- Mandy, Lucy, and Sally Rock: background vocals on 5
