= Rockin' Revival =

Studio album by Servant
- Released: April 1981
- Recorded: 1981
- Studio: Little Mountain Sound Studios (Vancouver, British Columbia, Canada)
- Genre: Christian rock
- Length: 37:22
- Label: Tunesmith
- Producer: Bob Brooks

Servant chronology
Shallow Water (1979)	Rockin' Revival (1981)	World of Sand (1982)

Alternate Cover

Rockin' Revival is the second album by Servant, released by Tunesmith Records in 1982. It was the first album with Matt Spransy in the lineup. The original cover featured a picture of a revival meeting using a fisheye lens, but was later replaced by a number of concert photographs. The songs "Ad Man" and the high-energy "I'm Gonna Live" quickly became concert staples. In 2011, Rockin' Revival was added to the "CCM's 500 Best Albums of All Time" blog at No. 176.

== Reissue ==
On July 11, 2006, Rockin' Revival was reissued on CD by Retroactive Records.

== Track listing ==
Side one
No.	Title	Writer(s)	Length
1.	"Look Out Babylon"	Owen Brock / Bruce Wright	4:04
2.	"Rockin' Revival"	Sandie Brock / O. Brock / Wright	4:30
3.	"Isolated"	Wright	4:27
4.	"Heidelberg Blues"	S. Brock / David Holmes / O. Brock / Wright	4:12
5.	"Listen"	Wright	3:05
Total length:			20:18

Side two
No.	Title	Writer(s)	Length
1.	"Jealousies"	Eddie Money / Jimmy Lyon	3:48
2.	"Suburban Josephine"	O. Brock	3:58
3.	"Ad Man"	Wright / S. Brock	3:32
4.	"I'm Gonna Live"	Servant / Doug Pinnick	5:46
Total length:			17:04

== Credits ==
Musicians

- Sandie Brock – lead vocals, percussion
- Bob Hardy – lead vocals, percussion
- Matt Spransy – acoustic piano, Polymoog, Prophet-5, Oberheim synthesizer, Hammond organ
- Bruce Wright – lead guitars, talk box
- Owen Brock – rhythm guitars, vocals
- Rob Martens – bass guitar, vocals
- David Holmes – drums, vocals, lead vocals (3, 7)

Production

- Bob Brooks – producer for Signature Productions, Inc.
- Bob Rock – engineer
- Mike Fraser – assistant engineer
- Rev – remastering at Creation Station Media
- Matthew Hunt – reissue executive producer
