= Payolas =

Canadian new wave band

- Also known as: Paul Hyde and the Payolas; Rock and Hyde
- Origin: Vancouver, British Columbia, Canada
- Genres: New wave, rock
- Years active: 1978-1988; 1994-1995; 1999; 2003-2008
- Labels: A&M; EMI
- Past members: Paul Hyde; Bob Rock; Alex "A-Train" Boynton; Chris Taylor; Gary Middleclass; Lawrence Wilkins; Lee Kelsey; Barry Muir; Taylor Nelson Little; Christopher Livingston; Ian Tiles; Marty Higgs

Payolas (stylized as Payola$) were a Canadian rock band that was most prominent in the 1980s. Evolving from a new wave sound toward mainstream pop rock, they were best known for the single "Eyes of a Stranger", from their 1982 album No Stranger to Danger, an album that won the band four Juno Awards.

Based in Vancouver, the band had experienced several changes to both its name and lineup, having been known as The Payola$, Paul Hyde and the Payolas, and Rock and Hyde. Vocalist and lyricist Paul Hyde and multi-instrumentalist, songwriter and producer Bob Rock were the band's core members throughout its history. The band broke up in 1988, but reformed again from 2003 to 2008.

== Band history ==
=== Name ===
The band's name is a reference to the United States payola scandal of the early 1960s, which was a pay-for-play scheme involving commercial radio stations. The name caused issues with A&M record executives who wanted to introduce the band to the American market and who were concerned about the term's negative connotations, which resulted in the band's name change to Paul Hyde and the Payola$ in 1985.

Rock told The Province in 2003 that their band's name caused one record executive to tell him "I won't lift a finger to help you." Rock added that it was Hyde that came up with the name and that "I was the idiot who put the dollar sign at the end."

=== Early years (1978–1981) ===
Paul Hyde, originally from Yorkshire, England, emigrated to Victoria, British Columbia at age fifteen. Hyde met Bob Rock while the pair were attending Belmont High School in Langford, a Victoria suburb. Rock, who moved to Victoria from Winnipeg at age twelve, described his first encounter with Hyde to the Times Colonist in 2007: "He had his hair all cut off, and later I found out it was because he wanted to look like a skinhead when he immigrated to Canada so he wouldn't get beat up. Being such a fan of English culture and bands, I saw this kid standing there in a long trenchcoat and shaved head and I went, 'That's a guy I wanna know.'"

Influenced by musical artists such as David Bowie, Slade, T. Rex, Alex Harvey, and Be-Bop Deluxe, the pair formed the Paul Kane Blues Band and toured Vancouver Island in the mid-1970s. In 1976, Rock landed a job as an apprentice recording engineer at Little Mountain Sound Studios in Vancouver and became acquainted with Vancouver's punk scene. Rock and Hyde were joined by drummer Ian Tiles (of Pointed Sticks) and bass player Marty Higgs to form the pop-punk band Payola$. At the time, Rock was producing mainly punk acts, such as the Young Canadians, The Dils, and the Pointed Sticks.

In 1979, Payola$ released their first single "China Boys" on their own Slophouse label. The song, whose lyrics reference the westernization of China, attracted the attention of A&M Records. Higgs and Tiles left shortly after the single was recorded and were replaced by drummer Taylor Nelson Little and sax/bass player Gary Middleclass (né Bourgeois). The four track EP Introducing Payola$ was released by A&M in 1980. Middleclass left in 1980 (later becoming a teacher at the Vancouver Film School sound design program); he was replaced by Lawrence Wilkins on bass. Lee Kelsey was added on keyboards. This quintet recorded 1981's In a Place Like This, first at Little Mountain studios, then completed at the famed Le Studio in Morin-Heights, Quebec. The album's sound contained both reggae and ska influences. Produced by Rock, In a Place Like This was a critical success, but didn't do well commercially.

=== Work with Mick Ronson (1982–1984) ===
In 1982, Chris Taylor was added to the band lineup; he replaced Taylor Little on drums. Kelsey left the band as well. This line-up recorded the album No Stranger to Danger, with famed English musician, songwriter and producer Mick Ronson acting as the album's producer. Ronson first heard of the Payolas when they were looking for a producer for In a Place Like This, but was unable to produce the album due to scheduling conflicts.

Incorporating elements of reggae, dub, pop, punk, and new wave, No Stranger to Danger included the hit single "Eyes of a Stranger", which won the Juno Award for best single. Junos were also given to Rock and Hyde for their songwriting, Rock was awarded Recording Engineer of the Year, and the band as a whole won the Most Promising Group.

The band toured with New Zealand new wave band Split Enz on the Canadian leg of their 1982 tour. Ronson joined the Payola$ on stage on keyboards. In the 2011 book, Have Not Been The Same; The CanRock Renaissance 1985–1995, Rock said: "The funniest things was that after we played the first date, all the guys in Split Enz were on stage going, 'Is that Mick Ronson? Who's this band?'" After the album had been issued, Wilkins left the group; Barry Muir filled in on bass, but as a sessioneer, not a group member. Christopher Livingston was added on keyboards as a full new group member.

Ronson produced the band's next album, Hammer on a Drum, released in 1984. The album included the single "Never Said I Loved You" featuring Carole Pope, vocalist of rock band Rough Trade, which reached No. 8 in Canada.

=== Work with David Foster (1985–1986) ===
In 1985, producer and songwriter David Foster helped assemble the supergroup Northern Lights to record the song "Tears Are Not Enough". Hyde was one of over 50 musicians featured on the song and Rock served as one of the engineers. Rock and Hyde came up with the song's title and contributed to the French lyrics along with Rachel Paiement.

That same year, A&M Records recruited Foster to produce the band's next recording, 1985's Here's the World for Ya, with the hopes of bringing the band to the American market. The band's name was also changed to Paul Hyde and the Payola$. By this point, the band consisted of Hyde, Rock, drummer Chris Taylor, and bassist Alex "A-Train" Boynton. Both Foster and Hyde's then-wife, Myriam Nelson, contributed some of the songwriting. Here's the World for Ya and the album's title track garnered six Juno Award nominations, including best group, album as well as best vocalist for Hyde, best sound engineer for Rock and songwriter of the year for both Rock and Hyde. The single, "You're the Only Love" charted in the US, peaking at No. 84 on the Billboard Hot 100 Chart—the first Payola$ single to do so.

The album marked a change in the band's sound that alienated many of their longtime fans as a result. In 1987, Tim O'Connor of Canadian Press said that the album "was glossy and tight, but it wasn't the Payola$." In that same article Hyde said, "We compromised ourselves somewhat artistically," adding "We were untrue to ourselves and our fans." Rock said of the experience, "We learned a lot from him, he's a very good musician. We saw a complete other side of recording with David. It was very polished and professional," adding "The thing with David (Foster) is that it swung far too much his way."

Despite the critical success, the album did not sell as well as hoped and the band was dropped by A&M in 1986.

=== Rock and Hyde (1987) ===
In 1987, the band rebranded themselves as Rock and Hyde and released Under the Volcano on Capitol/EMI. The album marked a return to the politically and socially conscious lyrics of the Payolas' early work, with Rock also handling the sound engineering. The Rock and Hyde sound was more pop-oriented than that of the Payolas. Under the Volcano reached No. 24 on the top 100 album chart in Canada.

Under the Volcano was critically well-received, and Rock and Hyde had two hits in Canada with "Dirty Water" (No. 20) and "I Will" (No. 40). "Dirty Water" also peaked on the US Billboard Hot 100 at No. 61.

Later that same year A&M capitalized on the band's renewed popularity and released a greatest hits package of Payolas work called Between a Rock and a Hyde Place: The Best of Payola$.

=== Hiatus (1988–2003) ===
After the release of Under the Volcano, Rock returned his focus to sound engineering and producing music from Little Mountain studios and became a go-to producer for hard rock and metal acts, producing albums for musical acts such as Loverboy, The Cult, Mötley Crüe, Metallica, Bon Jovi, and David Lee Roth. Along with ex-Payola$ drummer Chris Taylor, he was also involved in the band Rockhead that released an album in 1992.

The Payola$ reformed for a one-time gig on October 26, 1994, with Rock, Hyde, Boynton and new members Matt Frenette (drums) and Richard Sera (keyboards). Rock and Hyde then again went their separate ways. Paul Hyde pursued a solo recording career, releasing four albums between 1999 and 2002. These releases include 2000's Living off the Radar. Living off the Radar is a Payola$ album in all but name as it featured Rock as the album's producer, mixer, and guitarist; he was also the co-writer of several tracks. (Chris Taylor and Alex Boynton also played on a few tracks.)

The Best of the Payola$, 20th Century Masters, The Millennium Collection was released in 2002 in Universal Music's 20th Century Masters Series. The compilation included the Rock and Hyde track "Dirty Water".

=== Reunion (2003–2008) ===
Rock and Hyde played live in Vancouver in 2003, reformed as The Payolas. An EP called Missing Links was released for a charitable foundation, consisting of previously unreleased Payola$ songs and demos, a couple of which had surfaced earlier, in slightly different productions, on Paul Hyde's solo album Living off the Radar.

In 2006, they reunited once more. On July 17, 2007, the Payola$ released a seven-song EP, Langford (Part One), which was billed to Payola$, and featured Rock and Hyde as the only permanent members. (Several other musicians appeared on various tracks, but none were former band members.) It was announced that there would be a full-length follow-up to the Langford (Part One) EP, possibly incorporating some of the EP's tracks, however this release never materialized.

The band stopped performing live as of 2008, and the official Payolas website shut down in 2009. As with the band's first break-up, no formal announcement was made that the Payola$ were ceasing operations; however, later in 2009 Paul Hyde resumed his solo career, releasing his fifth studio album. In a 2020 interview with the Vancouver Sun, Hyde said that he hadn't performed live music in five years and had changed his focus towards visual art. However, in a 2023 podcast interview, Hyde revealed that he and Rock had been working on a covers album, for release at an indefinite future time. Whether this newly recorded material would be issued under the Payola$ name, or as Rock and Hyde, or perhaps using some other guise, was not revealed.

== Discography ==
=== Studio albums ===
- In a Place Like This (1981)
- No Stranger to Danger (1982) (#5 Canada)
- Hammer on a Drum (1983) (#26 Canada for 5 weeks)
- Here's the World for Ya (1985) (#26 Canada for 2 weeks)
- Under the Volcano (1987) (as Rock and Hyde) (#24 Canada for 2 weeks)
- Life and Death (TBA)

=== Compilation albums ===
- Between a Rock and a Hyde Place: The Best of Payola$ (1987)
- 20th Century Masters: The Millennium Collection – The Best of the Payola$ (2002)
- Missing Links (2003)

=== Extended plays ===
- Introducing Payola$ (1980)
- Langford Part One (2007)

=== Singles ===
Year	Artist credit	Title	Peak chart Positions			
Year	Artist credit	Title	CAN	AUS	US	US Rock
1979	Payolas	"China Boys"	—	—	—	—
1981	Payolas	"Jukebox"	—	—	—	—
1981	Payolas	"I'm Sorry (I Only Did It for the Money)"	—	—	—	—
1982	Payolas	"Eyes of a Stranger"	4	81	—	22
1982	Payolas	"Romance"	—	—	—	—
1982	Payolas	"Soldier"	25	—	—	—
1983	Payolas with Carole Pope	"Never Said I Loved You"	8	—	—	—
1983	Payolas	"Where Is This Love"	—	—	—	—
1983	Payolas	"Christmas Is Coming"/"I'll Find Another (Who Can Do It Right)"	—	—	—	—
1984	Payolas	"Wild West"	—	—	—	—
1985	Paul Hyde and the Payolas	"You're The Only Love"	26	—	84	37
1985	Paul Hyde and the Payolas	"Stuck in the Rain"	77	—	—	—
1985	Paul Hyde and the Payolas	"Here's the World"	91	—	—	—
1985	Paul Hyde and the Payolas	"It Must Be Love"	94	—	—	—
1987	Rock and Hyde	"Dirty Water"	20	—	61	6
1987	Rock and Hyde	"I Will"	40	—	—	—
1987	Rock and Hyde	"Talk to Me"	—	—	—	—
2006	Payolas	"Bomb"	—	—	—	—
2006	Payolas	"At the Angel's Feet"	—	—	—	—
2008	Payolas	"Shark Attack"	—	—	—	—
"—" denotes a recording that did not chart or was not released in that territory.
