= The Damn Truth =

Canadian hard rock band

The Damn Truth are a Canadian hard rock band based in Montreal, Quebec. They are most noted for their 2025 self-titled album, which was a Juno Award nominee for Rock Album of the Year at the Juno Awards of 2026.

The band currently consists of lead singer and rhythm guitarist Lee-La Baum, lead guitarist Tom Schemer, bassist Pierre-Yves Letellier and drummer Dave Traina. Letellier is a later addition to the band, replacing original bassist David Massé. Baum and Schemer are a couple, who first met at a hippie rock festival in Israel.

They released their debut album, Dear in the Headlights, independently in 2012, later signing to Fineline Records for their 2016 album Devilish Folk. In 2018 they toured internationally as an opening act for ZZ Top.

In 2019 they began recording Now or Nowhere, with producer Bob Rock. Both their touring schedule and the completion of the album were disrupted by the COVID-19 pandemic in 2020, and the band completed the final three songs on the album with producer Jean Massicotte before releasing the album in 2021.

Rock returned as producer for The Damn Truth, which was released in 2025.

In 2026, they supported Europe on their "Final Countdown Tour".

== Discography ==
- Dear in the Headlights - 2012
- Devilish Folk - 2016
- Now or Nowhere - 2021
- The Damn Truth - 2025
