= Tears Are Not Enough =

1985 single by Northern Lights

Single by Northern Lights

from the album We Are the World
- B-side: "Tears Are Not Enough" (Instrumental)
- Released: May 1, 1985
- Recorded: February 10, 1985
- Studio: Manta Sound Studios, Toronto
- Genre: Pop rock, gospel
- Length: 4:28
- Label: Columbia 7073
- Songwriters: David Foster (music); Bryan Adams, Jim Vallance (lyrics); Rachel Paiement (French lyrics); Paul Hyde and Bob Rock (title)
- Producers: David Foster; Jim Vallance (co-producer)

"Tears Are Not Enough" is a 1985 charity single recorded by a supergroup of Canadian artists, under the name Northern Lights, to raise funds for relief of the 1983–85 famine in Ethiopia. It was one of a number of charity singles of that time frame such as "Do They Know It's Christmas?", "We Are the World", "Cantaré, cantarás" , "Éthiopie" and "Les Yeux de la faim".

Although recorded independently of the USA for Africa project, it was included on the full-length We Are the World album.

The project was organized by Bruce Allen, who brought together a large group of artists to record a song written by David Foster, Jim Vallance, Bryan Adams, Rachel Paiement, Paul Hyde and Bob Rock. Foster and Vallance wrote the music and initial lyrics, Adams completed the English-language lyrics, Paiement wrote the one French-language verse, Rock & Hyde contributed the song title. The song was recorded on February 10, 1985, at Manta Sound studios in Toronto.

Foster revealed the melody of the song was originally offered to filmmaker Joel Schumacher as incidental music for his film St. Elmo's Fire. Schumacher reportedly hated it but was later, in Foster's words, "really pissed" when it showed up later as a charity single.

The song was issued as the album's second and final single by Columbia Records on May 1, 1985, and quickly reached number one on Canada's RPM and The Record singles charts. It finished at number 15 on the year-end RPM chart for that year. The song's video also received extensive airplay on MuchMusic.

The vocals were recorded at Manta Sound Studios in downtown Toronto on Sunday, February 10, 1985. Gordon Lightfoot drove himself to the recording in a pick-up truck. Neil Young and Joni Mitchell arrived together in a taxi. Mark Holmes of Platinum Blonde arrived in a white stretch limousine.

Bryan Adams performed a live version of "Tears Are Not Enough" on July 13, 1985 during his Live Aid performance in Philadelphia.

On December 22, 1985, CBC Television aired a 90-minute documentary by John Zaritsky on the song and its creation. A CBC reporter, Brian Stewart, had been the first Western journalist to bring the famine in Ethiopia to worldwide attention. The film was a Genie Award nominee for Best Documentary Film at the 7th Genie Awards in 1986.

By 1990, the project had raised $3.2 million for famine relief projects in Africa. Ten percent of the funds raised was set aside to assist Canadian food banks.

== Performers ==
The song featured the work of 67 singers, musicians and recording personnel, with a chorus that included some (normally) non-musical celebrities.

=== Solo vocalists (in order) ===
- Gordon Lightfoot
- Burton Cummings
- Anne Murray
- Joni Mitchell
- Dan Hill
- Neil Young
- Bryan Adams
- Corey Hart
- Bruce Cockburn
- Geddy Lee
- Mike Reno

=== Heard in duos or trios ===
- Mike Reno with Liberty Silver
- Carroll Baker, Ronnie Hawkins, and Murray McLauchlan
- Véronique Béliveau, Robert Charlebois, and Claude Dubois (in French language)
- Bryan Adams with Donny Gerrard
- Alfie Zappacosta with Lisa Dal Bello
- Carole Pope and Paul Hyde
- Salome Bey, Mark Holmes, and Lorraine Segato

=== Chorus members ===
Chorus members included:

- Alan Thicke
- Aldo Nova
- Ainalem Tebeje
- Andy Kim
- Brian Good (The Good Brothers)
- Bruce Murray
- Catherine McClenahan
- Catherine O'Hara
- Colina Phillips
- Eugene Levy
- Frank Mills
- Gordon Deppe (Spoons)
- Graham Shaw
- Ian Thomas
- Jane Siberry
- John Candy
- Kim Mitchell
- Leroy Sibbles
- Liona Boyd
- Marc Jordan
- Martha Johnson
- Oscar Peterson
- Paul Shaffer
- Richard Manuel
- Robin Duke
- Sharon Lee Williams
- Sylvia Tyson
- Tom Cochrane
- Tommy Hunter
- Wayne St. John

=== Instrumentation and production ===
- David Foster - Keyboards, Synth Bass, Producer
- Jim Vallance - Drums, Engineer, Associate Producer
- Paul Dean (Loverboy) - Guitar
- Steven Denroche - French Horn
- Doug Johnson (Loverboy) - Synthesizer
- David Sinclair (Straight Lines / Body Electric) - Acoustic guitar
- Hayward Parrott - Engineer
- Geoff Turner - Engineer
- Bob Rock - Engineer
- Humberto Gatica - Mixing Engineer

== Recording process ==
Bruce Cockburn could not participate in the Toronto recording session, due to performing in Germany at that time. Producer Jim Vallance flew to Germany to record audio and video of Bruce performing his line in the song, which were eventually edited into the song and music video respectively.

Joni Mitchell later spoke to writer Iain Blair about the recording experience: "I know it sounds ridiculous, but I was literally starving when we did the session 'cause my yoga teacher had sent me to a psychic dietician who, while rubbing her chin and swinging her arm around in a circle, had diagnosed a lot of food allergies. The result was, predictably, that I was hardly allowed to eat anything, so by the time I arrived with an apple and a rice patty, my poor stomach was making all these strange noises. Then we get in the studio, and the engineer says he can't record 'cause he's picking up some weird rumbling sound coming from my direction. (She laughed.) And it was all pretty ironic, considering the subject matter!"

At one point during the recording process, Foster also had Neil Young re-record his line after singing the lyric "innocence" flat, to which Young iconically quipped, "That's my sound, man."

== Music acts not appearing ==
- Buffy Sainte-Marie - According to journalist Terry David Mulligan, Sainte-Marie was supposed to be part of the project but did not show up to recording sessions. As a result, the term "Buffy bailed" became an expression in certain Canadian music circles.
- Leonard Cohen - Because Cohen performed the day before the recording session in Copenhagen, Denmark, he would have been unable to appear on the recording.
- Rik Emmett - The Triumph frontman was on tour in the United States at the time "Tears Are Not Enough" was recorded. Triumph played a show at the Beaumont Civic Center in Beaumont, Texas that day. Emmett says he was invited and would have loved to be part of the recording but scheduling would not allow and recording verses remotely was not an option.
- Bill Henderson - The Chilliwack frontman and guitarist says he was invited to appear, but turned it down because he was only offered a chance to play rhythm guitar, not a solo.
- Randy Bachman - On the Toronto Mike'd podcast, Bachman revealed he was never asked to appear on the recording.
- Stompin' Tom Connors - The recording of "Tears Are Not Enough" overlapped with Connors' self-imposed retirement, a move meant to protest the lack of support given to the country's stories by the policies of the Federal government. Therefore, Connors was unable to attend the sessions.
- Paul Anka - Due to scheduling conflicts, he did not record nor join with the supergroup.

== Video ==
The song's video opens with footage from Brian Stewart's original CBC News report on the famine, and then cuts to all Canadian performers singing the song in a recording studio. Near the end of the video, footage also appears from the 1985 NHL All-Star Game in Calgary, two days after the studio session, depicting the Campbell Conference All-Stars and the Wales Conference All-Stars — including Wayne Gretzky, Grant Fuhr, Jari Kurri and Miroslav Frycer — singing along as the audience waves flags and banners in the air.

== 2022 live version ==
A live version of "Tears Are Not Enough" was performed at the Canadian Songwriters Hall of Fame gala in Toronto on September 24, 2022. The rendition included many original Northern Lights members including soloists Hart, Hill, and Cockburn plus new Canadian talent such as Alessia Cara and Charlotte Cardin.

== See also ==
- Do They Know It's Christmas?
