= Servant (band) =

Canadian Christian rock band

- Origin: Victoria, British Columbia, Canada
- Genres: Christian rock, contemporary Christian
- Years active: 1976–1990
- Labels: Tunesmith, Rooftop, Myrrh/Word
- Past members: Sandie Brock; Owen Brock; Bob Hardy; Bruce Wright; David Holmes; Rob Martens; Matt Spransy; Eric Odell; Tim Spransy; Sam (Evan) Evans; Tim McAllister; Linford Detweiler; Ric Hordinski; Brian Kelley

Servant was a Christian rock group that grew out of the counter-culture Jesus Movement of the sixties and seventies. While living in Tucson Arizona they asked a friend there to pray with him about direction. He saw in division a bright gold leaf with a background of a dark green forest. To them that meant they were to go to Canada. The rest is history The band was founded in Victoria, British Columbia in 1976 by Jim Palosaari and performed to audiences throughout North America, Europe and Australia for over 12 years. Originally named "Higher Ground", the group later changed their name to Servant. The lyrics of their songs were known for challenging the Christian Church to turn back to social justice and caring for the poor.

A Servant rock concert was like a festival event. The band was known to incorporate comedy and short skits in their sets on stage. Servant was also the first Christian rock group to use laser lights, flame tubes, fireworks, fog machines, in addition to an extensive light show and quadraphonic sound (a precursor to surround-sound).

In the early 1980s some critics considered Servant's theatrics, light shows, smoke-bombs and flash-pot stage performances too raucous to be authentically Christian. However, the band's mission was to reach the ears and hearts of those who might not feel so comfortable in church buildings. Shying away from the praise lyrics and easy-listening rock styles that typified most contemporary Christian music at the time, Servant instead attempted to offer edgy, rhythmic, passionate rock and an aggressive stage performance filled with an evangelistic Christian message, and spiced with strong social commentaries.

A CCM Magazine review of their 1981 release, Rockin' Revival, stated that the band's lyrics reflected Christian communal subculture, and contained elements of social protest and criticism.

Servant toured extensively throughout America, Europe and Australia in concert halls and at music festivals like Creation and Greenbelt. They recorded 6 studio albums with songs that ranked in the Top 40 Contemporary Christian Music Charts including "Come Jesus Come", "Holding on to You", "Thank God", "We are the Light", "Surrender", "Harder to Finish", and "I Will".

From 1981 to 1985, opening acts for Servant included Grammy Award-winning Petra, DeGarmo & Key, Joe English (of Paul McCartney & Wings fame), Will McFarlane (recorded with Jackson Browne), Randy Matthews, Jerusalem, and Steve Camp. Petra opened for Servant on tour in late 1981 and early 1982 just as Petra's breakthrough album, Never Say Die was being released.

The band reunited to perform a one-off concert at Cornerstone Festival in July 2011.

In November 2013, Servant was awarded with the Lifetime Achievement Award from GMA Canada during ceremonies held during the 35th Annual Covenant Awards. On hand to receive the award were band members: Sandie Brock, Owen Brock, Bob Hardy, Rob Martens, Matt Spransy and Eric Odell.

== Formative years ==
Servant has some origins in 1973 from Lonesome Stone, directed by Jim Palosaari, a Christian rock musical touring Europe billed as a multi-media production of the Jesus generation portrayed in music, film and drama to rival the likes of the musical Godspell. Servant's first song to hit the Top 40 CCM charts, "Come Jesus Come", was first recorded in 1973 on Lonesome Stone's LP. Lonesome Stone was an outreach of Jesus People Europe, which came out of Jesus People Milwaukee (both led by Jim and Susan Palosaari), the latter forming the basis of what eventually became Jesus People USA in Chicago. After Jesus People Europe disbanded, Palosaari and others formed the Highway Missionary Society a year later, based in British Columbia, Canada, with Servant an outreach of the Society, based on the West Coast of North America. In 1984 they were renamed The Servant Community in Cincinnati, Ohio, as Servant became the primary outreach of the community.

== Members ==
- Sandie Brock — lead vocals
- Bob Hardy — lead vocals (1979–1984)
- Bruce Wright — lead guitar, backing vocals (1977-1985) (died 1993)
- Owen Brock — rhythm guitar, backing vocals
- Rob Martens — bass, backing vocals (1977-1988)
- David Holmes — drums, backing and occasional lead vocals (1977-1985)
- Matt Spransy — keyboards (1981–1986)
- Eric Odell — lead vocals, acoustic and 12-string electric guitars (1984–1986)
- Tim Spransy — lead Guitar (1985–1987)
- Sam (Evan) Evans — drums, backing vocals (1985–1988)
- Randy Brown — keyboards (1986-1990)
- Tim McAllister — lead guitar (1987)
- Ric Hordinski — lead guitar (1988-1990)
- Linford Detweiler — bass, keyboards (1988-1990)
- Brian Kelley — drums (1988-1990)

== Discography ==
- Shallow Water (1979), Tunesmith
- Rockin' Revival (1981), Tunesmith
- Remix (1981), Horizon (A project unauthorized by the band members. Produced by Tunesmith after Servant left the label to start their own recording company, [RoofTop Records].)
- World of Sand (1982), Rooftop Records
- Caught in the Act of Loving Him (1983), Rooftop Records
- Light Maneuvers (1984), Myrrh Records
- Swimming in a Human Ocean (1985), Myrrh Records
