= 2WO =

Studio album by Strange Advance
- Released: February 1985
- Recorded: Phase One Studios, Toronto, Britannia Row, London, UK, Mushroom Studios, Vancouver, BC, ESP Studios, Buttonville, Ontario
- Genre: Rock, new wave
- Label: Capitol
- Producer: Drew Arnott; Michael Kamen ("Nor Crystal Tears" only)

Strange Advance chronology
Worlds Away (1982)	2WO (1985)	The Distance Between (1988)

Singles from 2WO
- 1. "We Run" Released: 1985; 2. "Running Away" Released: 1985; 3. "The Second That I Saw You" Released: 1985

2WO is the second studio album by Canadian new wave band Strange Advance released in February, 1985. It featured two hit Canadian singles, "We Run" and "The Second That I Saw You". Along with their first album, this was a Canadian gold record for the band.

== Background and writing ==
This recording features heavy use of keyboards and synthesizers including the Fairlight, Yamaha DX7, and Jupiter 8.

Recalling the inspiration behind the hit song "We Run", Drew Arnott said it was "one of those 'wake up sweating' dreams. I just described what I saw. The smallest things can be the most inspiring. Ed Shaw added a delay to a sound in "We Run" which made the whole track come alive for me. Major bow to Michael Kamen for the strings and Scott Litt (REM) for the mix."

One song written during the 2WO sessions but left off the record was "Lady with a Blade", which would later appear on the 1995 compilation album Worlds Away & Back.

== Critical reception ==
Professional ratings
Review scores
Source	Rating
AllMusic	4.5/5 stars

Tomas Mureika of allmusic calls 2WO "A seriously overlooked album".

== Track listing ==
All tracks are written by Drew Arnott, except where noted

No.	Title	Writer(s)	Producer(s)	Length
1.	"I'll Be the One to Cry"	Drew Arnott	Drew Arnott	3:56
2.	"The Second That I Saw You"	Arnott	Arnott	3:20
3.	"We Run"	Arnott	Arnott	3:59
4.	"Prelude"	Arnott	Arnott	2:02
5.	"Home of the Brave"	Arnott	Arnott	6:34
6.	"The Sounds of Life"	Arnott	Arnott	4:00
7.	"Blue Fire"	Darryl Kromm	Arnott	4:14
8.	"Just Like You"	Arnott	Arnott	5:41
9.	"Running Away"	Kromm	Arnott	4:15
10.	"Nor Crystal Tears"	Kromm	Michael Kamen	5:06

== Album credits ==
=== Personnel ===
- Darryl Kromm – lead vocals, guitar
- Drew Arnott – keyboards, drums, vocals, lead vocal on "We Run"

with:

- Ken "Spider" Sinnaeve – bass
- Gerald O'Brien – keyboards and arrangement assistance
- Howard Ayee – bass on "We Run", "The Second That I Saw You"
- Dawnlee Tait – backing vocals
- Andy Bown – 12 string guitar; bass on "Running Away"
- Ed Shaw – guitar
- Andy Newmark – drums on "Running Away"
- Earl Slick – guitar on "Running Away"
- David Roberts – backing vocals
- Steve Sexton – keyboards on "We Run"
- Keith Scott – guitars
- Chitose Ishikura – Japanese voiceover on "The Second That I Saw You"
- Chris Arnott – Gaelic voiceover
- Kevin Markland – percussion
- Laura Oldham – slapstick
- Michael Kamen – oboe, keyboards, vocal effect on "I'll Be the One to Cry"
- Domenic Troiano – guitar on "The Second That I Saw You"
- Tony Lester – guitar
- Simon Brierley – lead guitar
- John Jones – piano
- Ericka Goodman – harp
- Bernie LaBarge – backing vocals
- John Forbes, Jean Piche, Dee Long, Drew Arnott – Fairlight programming

=== Production ===
- Drew Arnott –– producer
- Michael Kamen – producer of "Nor Crystal Tears", string arrangements on "We Run"
- Remixing – Scott Litt; Drew Arnott & Lenny DeRose on "Nor Crystal Tears"
- Engineering – Lenny DeRose, Andy Jackson, Dave Oglivie, Dee Long, Scott Litt
- Mastering – Bob Ludwig, Masterdisk, New York
