= In View (song) =

Single by The Tragically Hip

from the album World Container
- Released: August 24, 2006
- Genre: Rock
- Length: 3:58
- Label: Universal Music Canada
- Songwriter: The Tragically Hip
- Producer: Bob Rock

The Tragically Hip singles chronology
"No Threat" (2005)	"In View" (2006)	"The Lonely End of the Rink" (2006)

Music video
- "In View" on YouTube

"In View" is a song by Canadian rock group The Tragically Hip. It was released in August 2006 as the lead single from their tenth full-length studio album, World Container. The song reached number one on Billboard's Canada Rock chart. "In View" also peaked at number one on the Canada Rock Top 30 chart in Radio & Records magazine.

== Personnel ==
Personnel taken from World Container liner notes.

The Tragically Hip

- Rob Baker
- Gord Downie
- Johnny Fay
- Paul Langlois
- Gord Sinclair

Additional performer

- Jamie Edwards – keyboards

== Charts ==
=== Weekly charts ===
Chart (2006)	Peak position
Canada Rock Top 30 (Radio & Records)	1
