= Strange Advance =

Canadian new wave band

- Drew Arnott and Darryl Kromm c. 1988

Background information
- Origin: Vancouver, British Columbia, Canada
- Genres: New wave
- Years active: 1982–1995, 2019–present
- Label: Capitol
- Members: Drew Arnott; Sean Dillon; Rob Bailey; Peter Trotzuk; Ian Cameron; Ross Friesen
- Past members: Darryl Kromm; Ric deGroot; Joey Alvero; David Quinton; Paul Iverson; Alexander Boynton
- Website: strangeadvance.com

Strange Advance is a Canadian new wave band formed in 1982 in Vancouver, British Columbia. They were nominated for a 1983 Juno Award as Most Promising Group of the Year and again in 1985 as Group of the Year. Their first three albums, 1982's Worlds Away, 1985's 2WO, and 1988's The Distance Between were Canadian gold selling records.

== History ==
=== 1982–1995: Formation and Canadian popularity ===
Strange Advance was initially made up of Drew Arnott (keyboards, percussion, vocals), Darryl Kromm (lead vocals, guitars), and Paul Iverson (bass). The three met in Vancouver and founded the group in 1980. Initially called Metropolis, they changed their name after discovering a band in Germany using "Metropolis".

The group's first album, Worlds Away featured the title track, "Worlds Away", which saw modest airplay in North American markets in 1983. The album was produced by Bruce Fairbairn, known for his work with Loverboy and Prism, but featured a very different sound from those groups. Rather than commercial hard rock, Strange Advance's music was a fusion of progressive rock and new wave, with a heavy reliance on synthesizers and keyboards.

Iverson left the group after the first album and was not replaced. The group's 1985 album 2WO also went gold in Canada and was produced by Arnott, using an extensive array of session players, and brought the band their first big Canadian hit with "We Run". Strange Advance had never played a live gig prior to 1985, so Arnott and Kromm added musicians Ric deGroot (keyboards), Ian Cameron (guitar, violin), Joey Alvero (bass), and David Quinton (drums) to the line-up, and supported the first two albums with a tour of Eastern Canada.

Strange Advance's third album, 1988's The Distance Between also used well-known session musicians (including Randy Bachman and Allan Holdsworth), and produced the top 20 single "Love Becomes Electric". Following this album's release, the group became essentially inactive. Arnott stated in 2021 that other music genres such as grunge were gaining popularity, and he wasn't interested in changing the group's sound.

In 1995, the Strange Advance compilation album Worlds Away & Back featured a mix of previously released material, outtakes, remixes, demos, and three newly recorded tracks—one from 1991, and two from 1995.

=== 2016–2018: Remastering and crowdfunding campaign ===
On 24 June 2016, The Distance Between was remastered and re-released on CD with two bonus tracks, an extended club mix of "Love Becomes Electric" and the previously unreleased song, "Flow My Tears".

In December 2018, Worlds Away was remastered and re-released on CD with two bonus tracks, the UK Dance Mix of "Love Games" (transferred from vinyl) and the b-side to "She Controls Me" – "Lost in Your Eyes". This marked the first time their debut has seen a CD release of any kind, despite the albums' popularity. This release is only available in the Philippines, on the Sound Philosophy label, which is a new boutique label for titles not released on CD. This version appears to be sourced from the master tapes.

On 17 September 2018, Drew Arnott announced a crowdfunding campaign on Facebook to finance a summer 2019 Strange Advance reunion tour. The fundraising was successful, and the band (minus Kromm) planned to perform in 2019 for the Radical Orbits Tour. Unfortunately, due to cancellations and delays, including Covid-19, the tour was rescheduled.

=== 2022–present: Reunion and touring ===
In April 2022, the new line up of, Drew Arnott (lead vocals, keyboards), Sean Dillion (lead vocals, guitar), Ian Cameron (guitar, violin, backing vocals), Rob Bailey (keyboards), Ross Friesen (drums, backing vocals), and Alex Boynton (bass), played their first show at the Hollywood Theatre in Vancouver, British Columbia. The Radical Orbits Tour also included dates in Ontario. In 2023, the Worlds Away 40th anniversary tour included dates in Victoria, British Columbia, several dates in Ontario and New Westminster, British Columbia. Strange Advance continues in 2024 with Peter Trotzuk on bass and backing vocals. The current tour started in Victoria, British Columbia in May and will include Canada's largest free outdoor concert, The Sound of Music Festival in Burlington, Ontario in June. More dates TBA.

== Discography ==
=== Studio albums ===
- Worlds Away (1982)
- 2WO (1985)
- The Distance Between (1988)
- 4 (2021)

=== Compilation albums ===
- Over 60 Minutes with... Strange Advance (1987)
- Worlds Away & Back (1995)

=== Music video compilations ===
- Strange Advance (1985)

=== Singles ===
Title	Release	Peak chart positions		Album
Title	Release	CAN Pop	CAN AC	Album
"She Controls Me"	1982	—	—	Worlds Away
"Kiss in the Dark"	1983	—	—	Worlds Away
"Love Games"	1983	—	—	Worlds Away
"Worlds Away"	1983	46	29	Worlds Away
"We Run"	1985	28	—	2WO
"Running Away"	1985	—	—	2WO
"The Second That I Saw You"	1985	—	20	2WO
"Love Becomes Electric"	1988	20	—	The Distance Between
"Till the Stars Fall"	1988	—	—	The Distance Between
"Hold You"	1988	—	—	The Distance Between

== See also ==
- List of bands from Canada
- List of bands from British Columbia
