= Zappacosta =

Canadian–Italian musician (born 1953)

- Birth name: Alfredo Peter Zappacosta
- Also known as: Alfie Zappacosta
- Born: July 5, 1953 (age 72); Sora, Italy
- Origin: Canada
- Genres: Rock; pop; jazz
- Occupation: Musician
- Instruments: Vocals; guitar
- Years active: 1978–present
- Labels: Capitol
- Website: zappacosta.ca

Alfredo Peter "Alfie" Zappacosta (born July 5, 1953), also known by just his surname, is an Italian-born Canadian musician.

== Career ==
Zappacosta's first band was Surrender, a five-piece group that recorded three albums in the late 1970s and early 1980s. In 1984, he recorded his first solo album, Zappacosta, which contained the hit singles "Passion" and "We Should Be Lovers". As a result, he won the Juno Award for "Most Promising Male Vocalist" the same year.

In 1985, Zappacosta lent his voice to the Canadian charity song "Tears Are Not Enough", produced by David Foster, singing the lines "Maybe we could understand the reasons why" in the fifth stanza, with Dalbello.

His second album, A to Z, was released in 1986 and featured the hit singles "When I Fall (In Love Again)" and "Nothing Can Stand in Your Way". Following this, a Zappacosta song entitled "Overload" was added to the 1987 Dirty Dancing soundtrack, one of the biggest-selling soundtracks of the 1980s. Later that year, Zappacosta sang the radio commercial jingle for Pizza Nova.

A third album, Quick!...Don't Ask Any Questions, was released in 1990, before he took time off to hone his vocal and guitar skills. He also pursued acting in various stage performances, and had a role in the 2005 Canadian movie Halo (not to be confused with the movie about the Microsoft videogame of the same name).

Zappacosta has subsequently released more albums, including 2004's Start Again, which contains reworked versions of some of his songs from the 1980s.

== Discography ==
=== Studio albums ===
- Zappacosta (1984)
- A to Z (1986) (#90 CAN)
- Quick!... Don't Ask Any Questions (1990)
- Innocence Ballet (1995)
- Dark Sided Jewel (1998)
- Start Again (2004)
- Bonafide (2008)
- Blame It on Me (2010)
- Once Upon a Time (2013)
- No Avoiding Cliches (2015)
- Strings Attached (2018)
- Saved (2021)

=== Live albums ===
- At the Church at Berkeley (2008)
- Live at the Blue Frog Studios (2012)

=== Compilation albums ===
- Over 60 Minutes with... Zappacosta (1987)

=== with Surrender ===
- Surrender (1979) (#96 Canada)
  - Single – "Find Your Way" (#86 Canada)
- No Surrender (1982)
  - Single – "Start Again" (#38 Canada)

=== Singles ===
- "We Should Be Lovers" (1984)
- "Passion" (1984)
- "Start Again" (1985)
- "When I Fall (In Love Again)" (1986) [CAN #44]
- "Turn It On" (1986) [CAN #95]
- "Nothing Can Stand in Your Way" (1986) [CAN #42]
- "I Think About You" (1986)
- "Overload" (1988)
- "Nothing to Do with Love" (1990)
- "Letter Back" (1990) [CAN #24]
- "I'll Be the One" (1991) [CAN #45]
- "Simple Words to Say" (1991) [CAN #44]
- "Show Me" (1995) [CAN #67]
- "Orlanda" (1995)
- "And We'll Dance" (2004)
- "Start Again" (2004)
