= Jim Palosaari =

American evangelist (1939–2011)

- Born: January 12, 1939; Michigan, U.S.
- Died: May 25, 2011 (aged 72); Oconomowoc, Wisconsin, U.S.
- Spouses: Joyce Warner (m. 1962; div. 1967); Susan Cowper (m. 1970; div. 1992); Susan Mattson (m. 1997; died 2008); Jo Sappenfield (m. 2011)
- Partner: Jeanette Donahue c. 1967

James Michael Palosaari (January 12, 1939 – May 25, 2011) was an American evangelist and performer, one of the leaders in the Jesus Movement of the late 1960s and 1970s.

== Early life ==
Palosaari was a first-generation American whose Finnish father emigrated through Ellis Island, New York. Born to John Palosaari (1901–1985) and Sara (née Leveck, 1905–1982) in the Upper Peninsula of Michigan, he grew up on a goat farm near Oconomowoc, Wisconsin, where he attended Oconomowoc High School.

== Jesus Movement ==
Palosaari became a Christian in Seattle, Washington during the Jesus Movement of the late 1960s. Trained in the faith by Linda Meissner, Palosaari and his wife Sue helped to form the nucleus of the Jesus People Army, establishing outposts in Yakima and Spokane, Washington; Boise, Idaho; and Vancouver, B.C. with Russell Griggs.

In Milwaukee, the Palosaaris began a coffeehouse, "The Jesus Christ Power House," Sue started a newspaper, "Street Level," Jim developed a new band, "Sheep," and they began a communal school called "Jesus People Discipleship Training Center" which grew to 200 members. At this time Meissner and Griggs joined the Jesus People Army to the Children of God (later called the Family International), although Palosaari unsuccessfully tried to dissuade them. In 1972, 60 members were sent to join Bill Lowery's tent ministry, "Christ is the Answer" (CITA), and a team of 30, including the band Charity, were sent out, later to reemerge in Chicago as Jesus People USA and "Rez Band". Earlier revivals in Racine, Wisconsin, and Duluth, Minnesota, now became autonomous communes.

The Palosaaris and thirty members flew to Sweden as guests of the Full Gospel Business Men, in order to provide a foil for the Children of God in England. Upon arrival, the group spent substantial time in Finland, where Palosaari preached in Temppeliaukion Kirkko, the Stone Church in Helsinki. Sheep produced its first record, "Karitsat Jeesus-rock", in Helsinki, Finland, sung partly in Finnish. From there the group toured for the next six months through Western Europe, including Germany and the Netherlands. The Jesus People entered Great Britain in the fall of 1972 to participate with Russell Griggs and David Hoyt in an exposé of the Children of God, at the invitation of financier Kenneth Frampton. With Frampton's backing Palosaari, Hoyt and the group now calling itself the "Jesus Family", enlarged by half, created the rock musical, "Lonesome Stone," a musical history of the early "Jesus Freaks." The musical opened at London's Rainbow Theatre, eventually touring American air force bases throughout Germany, Great Britain, Canada, and the American Midwest, before closing four years later. While in England, Palosaari, Kenneth Frampton and British national, James Holloway, started what was for many years the largest Christian music festival in the world, Greenbelt.

A year later, the Palosaaris, Owen and Sandie Brock, and Paul and Lydia Jenkinson met to form another commune on Vancouver Island, B.C., Canada calling themselves "Highway Missionary Society." Palosaari was the head elder of a council made up of men and women, developing their ideals of community, missionary work, and evangelism. The new group traveled constantly, and quickly formed a nucleus of followers. Palosaari put together the rock band Servant, which became the first Christian rock band to use lasers and an extensive light show. Servant produced six records and traveled throughout the U.S., Canada, and Great Britain, giving Petra their start when Petra opened for them. Community work also involved extensive showing of the movie Brother Sun, Sister Moon, about the life of Saint Francis of Assisi. Eventually the now enlarged communal group settled in Grants Pass, Oregon on land next to the Applegate River, where their interest in Christian community was supported through farming, work in town, and tree-planting. With Sue's effort, the community now formed a children's school. HMS sponsored Vietnamese and Laotian refugees coming into the country in the early 1980s. At this time Palosaari began Rooftop Records, producing one Servant album and sponsoring two other artists.

== Other work ==
Palosaari spent his early adult years in the Chicago and the Detroit theater, including The Unstabled Theater run by Edith Carroll Canter and Woodie King, Jr. (Actress Lily Tomlin got her start in the same theater company the year Jim joined).

After leaving HMS, the Palosaaris left to study and work with YWAM on the Big Island of Hawaii, and Oahu. Jim Palosaari went to work in Texas with CITA, which he would continue to return to periodically over the next decade. During this time he also promoted new Christian rock groups, including Newsboys, PID, and Whitecross.

In his later years Palosaari worked extensively in charitable fundraising. He narrated the movie Frisbee: The Life and Death of a Hippie Preacher, the story of one of the earliest and most well-known Jesus Freak leaders, Lonnie Frisbee, released in DVD form in January, 2007.

== Personal life ==
Palosaari was married four times. He married Joyce Warner in Detroit, in 1962, and moved to New York (Long Island) with his wife and stepson, Michael, about a year later. This union produced one son, Kent. Jim and Joyce were divorced in 1967. Jim and Jeanette Palosaari (not married) met in Wisconsin and became parents of a daughter, Sonja, in 1967. They moved together to southern California shortly after her birth. Shortly after his arrival in southern California Jim moved to northern California. In 1970, Jim married Susan Cowper, and had four children: Jedidiah, Seth, Cody, and Sophia. In 1981 Jim and Sue's second oldest son, Seth, died in an automobile accident with two other members of the community. The couple was divorced in 1992.

Five years later, Palosaari married Susan Mattson, who died in 2008. In March 2011 Palosaari married Jo Sappenfield. They lived in Palosaari's native state of Wisconsin until his death on May 25, 2011.

Palosaari was a self-described Democrat and socialist, committed less to party and politics than to the ideals of social justice, living in poverty, communal living, and a religious lifestyle in which everything is given up for God. He considered himself a Christian Primitivist, trying to live in the 20th century with the ideals of the 1st century Christians.

== Sources ==
- Encyclopedia of Evangelism
- Jesus People USA Notes
- History of the Jesus Movement, by David de Sabatino
- The Jesus People Movement: An Annotated Bibliography and General Resource by David de Sabatino
- Di Sabatino, David, History of the Jesus Movement: McMaster University, 1995
- Greenbelt History
- Young, Shawn David, Hippies, Jesus Freaks, and Music (Ann Arbor: Xanedu/Copley Original Works, 2005).
