= Paul Hyde =

- Born: Paul Reginald Nelson; 21 May 1955 (age 71); Harrogate, Yorkshire, England, UK
- Genres: Punk, new wave, folk, rock
- Instruments: vocals, guitar, keyboards
- Years active: 1978–present
- Labels: A&M, Capitol/EMI, Broken Records, Bongo Beat

Paul Reginald Nelson (born 21 May 1955), known by the stage name Paul Hyde, is a British-born Canadian singer-songwriter.

He co-founded the rock band Payola$ with Bob Rock, serving as the band's main lyricist and vocalist. He later performed and recorded with Rock under the band name Rock and Hyde and has released six solo albums over his musical career.

== Early life ==
Born in Harrogate, Yorkshire, England, Hyde emigrated to Canada at 15 years of age, settling in Victoria, British Columbia. Hyde met Bob Rock while the pair were attending Belmont High School in Langford, a Victoria suburb. Rock, who moved to Victoria from Winnipeg at age 12, described his first encounter with Hyde to the Times Colonist in 2007: "He had his hair all cut off, and later I found out it was because he wanted to look like a skinhead when he immigrated to Canada so he wouldn't get beat up. Being such a fan of English culture and bands, I saw this kid standing there in a long trenchcoat and shaved head and I went, 'That's a guy I wanna know.'"

The two connected on their love of glam rock and were both interested in the burgeoning Vancouver punk scene. Hyde traveled multiple times between England and Canada in his youth, bringing Rock with him on one occasion. In the mid-1970s, Hyde and Rock formed the Paul Kane Blues Band and toured Vancouver Island.

== Career ==
=== Payolas, Tears are Not Enough, Rock and Hyde (1978–1988) ===
In the late 1970s, Hyde followed Rock to Vancouver after Rock landed a job as an apprentice recording engineer at Little Mountain Sound Studios and was working with many bands from Vancouver's punk scene.

In 1978, the two men formed the punk-influenced rock band Payolas and released their first single "China Boys" on their own Slophouse label the following year. The song, whose lyrics reference the westernization of China, attracted the attention of A&M Records. Their four track EP Introducing Payola$ was released by A&M in 1980. The band recorded 1981's In a Place Like This, first at Little Mountain Sound Studios, then completed at the famed Le Studio in Morin-Heights, Quebec. The album's sound contained both reggae and ska influences. Produced by Rock, In a Place Like This was a critical success, but didn't do well commercially.

The band attracted the attention of famed British songwriter and producer Mick Ronson, who produced Payolas' 1982 album No Stranger to Danger. Incorporating elements of reggae, pop, punk, and new wave, No Stranger to Danger included the hit single (No. 4) in "Eyes of a Stranger", which won the Juno Award for best single. Junos were also given to Rock and Hyde for their songwriting, Rock was awarded Recording Engineer of the Year, and the band as a whole won the Most Promising Group.

In 1985, Hyde was a co-writer of the No. 1 Canadian charity single "Tears Are Not Enough" by Northern Lights. He was one of over 40 vocalists featured on the song. Hyde and Rock came up with the song's title and contributed to the French lyrics along with Rachel Paiement, receiving co-writer credits on the song along with Bryan Adams, David Foster, Paiement and Jim Vallance.

Hyde and Rock, whose band was now known as Paul Hyde and the Payolas, released the David Foster produced Here's the World for Ya in 1985. Hyde, Rock, and Miriam Nelson (who is also Hyde's wife) were recognised at the 1987 Performing Rights Organization of Canada Limited (PROCAN) awards presentation for their writing contributions to the album. Despite the critical acclaim, disappointing sales resulted in them dropped by A&M. In 1987 the pair signed with Capitol/EMI and put out one album, Under the Volcano, in 1987, this time credited as Rock and Hyde.

In 1985, producer and songwriter David Foster helped assemble the supergroup Northern Lights to record the song "Tears Are Not Enough". Hyde was one of over 40 vocalists featured on the song and Rock served as one of the engineers. Rock and Hyde came up with the song's title and contributed to the French lyrics along with Rachel Paiement, receiving co-writer credits on the song along with Bryan Adams, Foster, Paiement, and Jim Vallance.

=== Solo work (1989–2002) ===
In 1988, Hyde, Murray McLauchlan, and Tom Cochrane collaborated on the single "Let The Good Guys Win". The song was written by McLauchlan as a Christmas gift to the people of Capitol Records. That same year Hyde traveled to Los Angeles to record his debut solo album, Turtle Island, with producer Davitt Sigerson.

The album single "America is Sexy" the song was ranked as No. 23 of the top 25 Cancon songs of the year in 1988 and reached No. 28 on the RPM 100 Singles chart of 23–28 October. The album also appeared on the RPM Top 100 Albums chart in 1989.

Hyde released his next album Love and the Great Depression on the independent Canadian record label, Broken Records, in 1996. Hyde followed this album with Living off the Radar, which was released in 2000 by EMI Music Canada. Bob Rock produced the album and co-wrote some of the songs. In 2002 Hyde released The Big Book of Sad Songs, Volume 1 on the independent label, Bongo Beat.

=== Payolas reunion (2003–2008) ===
Rock and Hyde played live in Vancouver in 2003, reformed as The Payolas. An EP called Missing Links was released for a charitable foundation, consisting of previously unreleased Payolas songs and demos, a couple of which had surfaced earlier, in slightly different productions, on Hyde's solo album Living off the Radar.

In 2006, they reunited once more and on July 17, 2007, the Payola$ released a seven-song EP, Langford (Part One). It was announced that there would be a full length follow-up to the Langford (Part One) EP, possibly incorporating some of the EP's tracks, however this release never materialized.

The band stopped performing live as of 2008, and the official Payolas website shut down in 2009. In a 2018 interview with the Canadian music magazine, Music Express, Hyde indicated that a Payolas reunion was not imminent, not for lack of interest by his band mate Rock, but due in part to Hyde's fear of live performances.

=== Further solo work and work as a visual artist (2009–present) ===
In 2009, Paul Hyde resumed his solo career, releasing his fifth studio album Peace Sign, followed nine years later with the 2018 release No Gods, Just Men.

In a 2020 interview with the Vancouver Sun, Hyde said that he hadn't performed live music in five years and had changed his creative focus towards visual art. Hyde exhibited 26 of his collages at Chernoff Fine Art in Vancouver in 2020.

In a 2023 podcast interview, Hyde revealed that he and Rock had been working on a covers album, for release at an indefinite future time.

== Discography ==
=== Solo albums ===
- Turtle Island (1989)
- Love and the Great Depression (1996)
- Living off the Radar (2000)
- The Big Book of Sad Songs, Volume 1 (2002)
- Peace Sign (2009)
- No Gods, Just Men (2018)

== Personal life ==
Hyde has three children with ex-wife Myriam Nelson. He has a son and twin daughters.
