= The Motels discography =

- Studio albums: 13
- Live albums: 3
- Compilation albums: 8
- Singles: 28
- Video albums: 12

The Motels and Martha Davis discography includes the following.

== Albums ==
=== Studio albums ===
Year	Album	US	AUS	CAN	notes
1979	Motels	175	13	–	* AU: Gold
1980	Careful	45	26	–	* AU: Gold
1982	All Four One	16	20	39	* US: Gold
1983	Little Robbers	22	34	28	* US: Gold
1985	Shock	36	23	64	
1987	Policy	127	28	–	(Martha Davis solo)
2004	...So the Story Goes	–	–	–	(Martha Davis solo)
2007	Clean Modern and Reasonable	–	–	–	Contains acoustic versions of past hits, B-sides and Davis solo material, including new recordings of "Take The L", "Only the Lonely", and "Suddenly Last Summer".
2008	This	–	–	–	
2008	Beautiful Life	–	–	–	(Martha Davis solo)
2010	Red Frog Presents: 16 Songs for Parents and Children	–	–	–	(Martha Davis solo)
2011	Apocalypso	–	–	–	originally recorded in 1981
2018	The Last Few Beautiful Days	–	–	–	
TBD	Escape from Planet Earth				

=== Compilation albums ===
Year	Album	AUS	Notes
1978	Saturday Night Pogo	–	Counting (demo)
1988	No Reservations	49	
1990	No Vacancy	–	(song list same as No Reservations)
2001	Anthologyland	–	
2002	Classic Masters	–	
2003	The Best of	–	
2005	Essential Collection	–	
2017	If Not Now Then When	–	Collection of rarities, outtakes from So the Story Goes and Beautiful Life.

=== Live albums ===
Year	Album	notes
2007	Standing Room Only	Live at the Coach House
2009	Atomic Cafe: Greatest Songs Live	Live in Boston 1979 & 1980
2016	The Motels at the BBC (Live)	Live at the BBC 1979

== Soundtrack contributions ==
Year	Film	song
1984	Moscow on the Hudson	"Long Day"
1984	Teachers	"In the Jungle (Concrete Jungle)"
1986	The Golden Child	"Shame on You" (Martha Davis solo) (song is on the soundtrack but not in the movie)
1986	Something Wild	"Total Control"
1986	Night of the Creeps	"Nightmares" (Martha Davis solo)
1986	Soul Man	"Love and Affection" (Martha Davis and Sly Stone duet)
1987	Made in Heaven	"We've Never Danced" (Martha Davis solo)
1990	Madhouse	"Madhouse" (Martha Davis solo)
1992	Miracle Beach	"I Can't Believe" (Martha Davis solo)
1993	Death Ring	"Mission of Mercy"
1997	A Smile Like Yours	"You Got What It Takes" (Martha Davis and Ivan Neville duet)

== Singles ==
Year	Song	US Hot 100	US AC	US Rock	US Dance	AUS	CAN	UK	FRA	BEL	NL	NZ	Album
1979	"Closets & Bullets"	–	–	–	–	–	–	–	–	–	–	–	Motels
1979	"Total Control"	109	–	–	–	7	–	–	19	–	–	11	Motels
1980	"Anticipating"	–	–	–	–	–	–	–	–	–	–	–	Motels
1980	"Days Are OK"	–	–	–	–	–	–	41	–	–	–	–	Careful
1980	"Danger"	–	–	–	–	88	–	–	15	–	–	30	Careful
1980	"Whose Problem?"	–	–	–	–	43	–	42	–	–	–	–	Careful
1982	"Mission of Mercy"	–	–	23	–	–	–	–	–	–	–	–	All Four One
1982	"Only the Lonely"	9	27	6	7	28	21	–	–	–	–	10	All Four One
1982	"Take the L"	52	–	36	–	21	–	–	–	–	–	44	All Four One
1982	"Forever Mine"	60	–	–	–	–	–	–	–	–	–	–	All Four One
1983	"Art Fails"	–	–	–	–	–	–	–	–	–	–	–	All Four One
1983	"Suddenly Last Summer"	9	18	1	18	34	11	–	–	16	20	28	Little Robbers
1983	"Remember the Nights"	36	–	12	–	–	–	–	–	–	–	–	Little Robbers
1983	"Little Robbers"	–	–	18	–	–	–	–	–	–	–	–	Little Robbers
1984	"Footsteps"	–	–	–	–	–	–	–	–	–	–	–	Little Robbers
1984	"In the Jungle"	–	–	–	–	–	–	–	–	–	–	–	Teachers Soundtrack
1985	"Shame"	21	22	10	14	18	25	–	–	–	–	–	Shock
1985	"Shock"	84	–	–	–	–	–	–	–	–	–	–	Shock
1985	"Icy Red"	–	–	–	–	–	–	–	–	–	–	–	Shock
1986	"Love and Affection"	–	–	–	–	–	–	–	–	–	–	–	Soul Man Soundtrack
1987	"We've Never Danced" (Martha Davis solo)	–	–	–	–	–	–	–	–	–	–	–	Made in Heaven Soundtrack
1987	"Don't Tell Me the Time"	80	–	–	–	8	–	–	–	–	–	–	Policy (Martha Davis solo)
1988	"Tell It to the Moon"	–	–	–	–	65	–	–	–	–	–	–	Policy (Martha Davis solo)
1988	"Just Like You"	–	–	47	–	–	–	–	–	–	–	–	Policy (Martha Davis solo)
1988	"Don't Ask Out Loud"	–	–	–	–	90	–	–	–	–	–	–	Policy (Martha Davis solo)
1988	"What Money Might Buy"	–	–	–	–	–	–	–	–	–	–	–	Policy (Martha Davis solo)
2009	"Mr. Grey"	–	–	–	–	–	–	–	–	–	–	–	non-album single
2017	"Lucky Stars"	–	–	–	–	–	–	–	–	–	–	–	The Last Few Beautiful Days
2026	"Strange Days"	–	–	–	–	–	–	–	–	–	–	–	Escape Planet Earth

== Other Martha Davis works ==
Year	Album	Notes
2005	Omnium	Written with Teatro ZinZanni Maestro Norm Durkee
2005	A T. Rex Named Sue	Contributed on the song "Fossile Hunter"
2006	That 80's Merry Christmas Album	Contributed on the song "Santa Baby"

== The Motels / Martha Davis videos ==
Year	Video	Notes
1980	Danger	
1980	Whose Problem?	
1982	Only the Lonely	produced by Russell Mulcahy
1982	Take the L	produced by Russell Mulcahy
1983	Suddenly Last Summer	produced by Val Garay
1983	Remember the Nights	produced by Val Garay
1985	Shame	produced by David Fincher
1985	Shock	produced by David Fincher
1986	Icy Red	
1986	Cries and Whispers	
1987	Don't Tell Me the Time	produced by David Fincher
1988	Tell It to the Moon	produced by David Fincher
2011	Lost but Not Forgotten	edited by Alan Suboter
2018	Lucky Stars	produced by Anna Logg
2026	Strange Days	created by Icons Creating Evil Art

== Awards ==
- American Music Awards 1982: Best Performance for "Only the Lonely" at the 1982 American Music Awards.
- Independent Music Awards 2012: Apocalypso – Best Re-Issue Album

== Notes ==
- Rolling Stone – The Motels return with their "Version 2.0" – September 2, 1999
- Orange County Register – Entertainment section – July 16, 2005
- Personal writings from band members – Official website themotels.com
- Former band member Marty Jourard – Jourard.com
- Creem – Take the El out of Motels and it's Mots – February 1983
- Creem – The Motels: Martha Davis feeds her family – December 1980
- Los Angeles Times – The Motels: booked solid – April 29, 1979
- Orange County Weekly – No Vacancy – October 5, 2000
