= No Vacancy – The Best of The Motels =

Compilation album by The Motels
- Released: 1990
- Genre: New wave
- Length: 1:08:44
- Label: Capitol
- Producer: Val Garay, Richie Zito, John Carter

The Motels chronology
No Reservations (1988)	No Vacancy – The Best of The Motels (1990)	Anthologyland (2001)

Professional ratings
Review scores
Source	Rating
AllMusic	4.5/5 stars

No Vacancy – The Best of The Motels is a compilation album by the new wave band, The Motels released in 1990. This album was released in United States, manufactured for BMG Direct Marketing. The album is a re-labeled version of No Reservations, which was released in Australia two years previously.

== Track listing ==
All tracks are written by Martha Davis, except where noted.

No.	Title	Writer(s)	From the album	Length
1.	"Danger"	Martha Davis, Tim McGovern	Careful, 1980	3:25
2.	"Only the Lonely"		All Four One, 1982	3:16
3.	"Celia"		Motels, 1979	3:06
4.	"Shame"		Shock, 1985	4:11
5.	"Careful"	Marty Jourard, Michael Goodroe	Careful	3:30
6.	"Suddenly Last Summer"		Little Robbers, 1983	3:39
7.	"So L.A."		All Four One	3:34
8.	"Cries and Whispers"	Davis, Richie Zito, Davitt Sigerson	Shock	4:09
9.	"Icy Red"		Shock	4:28
10.	"Apocalypso"		All Four One	3:29
11.	"Total Control"	Davis, Jeff Jourard	Motels	5:53
12.	"Take the L"	Davis, M. Jourard, John Carter	All Four One	3:38
13.	"Trust Me"		Little Robbers	3:24
14.	"Remember the Nights"	Davis, Scott Thurston	Little Robbers	3:04
15.	"Bonjour Baby"	M. Jourard, Goodroe	Careful	3:25
16.	"Little Robbers"		Little Robbers	3:53
17.	"Annie Told Me"	Davis, Brian Glascock	Shock	4:18
18.	"Kix"		Motels	2:15
19.	"Whose Problem?"		Careful	3:54
Total length:				1:08:44

== Charts ==
Chart position for No Reservations
Chart (1988)	Peak position
Australia (ARIA Charts)	49
