= Standing Room Only (The Motels album) =

Live album by The Motels
- Released: January 30, 2007
- Recorded: June 9, 2006
- Genre: New wave
- Length: 38:57
- Label: Sony BMG
- Producer: Martha Davis, David Paglia

The Motels chronology
Shock (1985)	Standing Room Only (2007)	Clean Modern and Reasonable (2007)

Standing Room Only is the first live album by the band The Motels, recorded live on June 9, 2006, at The Coach House, San Juan Capistrano.

== Track listing ==
- All songs written by Martha Davis, except where noted.
1. "So L.A." – 4:41
2. "Closets and Bullets" – 3:44
3. "Suddenly Last Summer" – 4:22
4. "Counting" – 4:53
5. "Celia" – 3:10
6. "Shame" – 3:58
7. "Danger" (Davis, Tim McGovern) – 3:26
8. "Mission of Mercy" – 3:23
9. "Only the Lonely" – 3:29
10. "Take the L" (Davis, Marty Jourard, John Carter) – 3:51

== Personnel ==
Credits are taken from the CD's liner notes.

=== The Motels ===
- Martha Davis – vocals
- Mick Taras – lead guitars
- Clint Walsh – guitars
- Greg Nobles – bass guitar
- Scott Martin – saxophone
- Tom Brayton – drums
- Nic Johns – noises, sounds, and piano

== Production ==
Credits are taken from the CD's liner notes.

- Produced by Martha Davis, David Paglia
- Recorded by Mark Linnet
- Mixing engineered by Jeff Stuart Saltzman
- Art direction and design by Lisa Sparagano
