= Anthologyland =

Compilation album by The Motels, Martha Davis, and others
- Released: 2001
- Genre: New wave
- Length: 2:01:29
- Label: Oglio Records, EMI-Capitol Special Markets
- Producer: Martha Davis, Dave Paglia, Cheryl Pawelski

The Motels, Martha Davis, and others chronology
No Vacancy (1990)	Anthologyland (2001)	Classic Masters (2002)

Professional ratings
Review scores
Source	Rating
Allmusic	3/5 stars

Anthologyland is a compilation album containing material from the new wave band, The Motels, plus work by Warfield Foxes (an earlier incarnation), and solo work by Martha Davis, including a couple of duets with Sly Stone and Ivan Neville. This two disc album is a collection of alternate takes, demonstrations, live recordings, outtakes, and sound track releases.

== Track listing ==
- All tracks are performed by The Motels, unless otherwise listed.
- Song version and year are taken from the CD's liner notes.

Disc One

1. "Every Day Star" (demo, by Warfield Foxes, 1974/5) (Chuck Wada) – 3:36
2. "Route 66" (live, 1979) (Nelson Riddle) – 2:19
3. "Boys" (outtake, 1979) (Martha Davis) – 3:59
4. "Total Control" (live, 1979) (Davis, Marty Jourard) – 5:52
5. "The Big Hurt" (live, 1980) (Wayne Shanklin) – 2:58
6. "Celia" (live, 1980) (Davis) – 3:08
7. "Counting" (live, 1979) (Davis) – 4:28
8. "Amigo" (outtake, 1979) (Michael Goodroe) – 3:52
9. "Careful" (alternate take, 1980) (Jourard, Michael Goodroe) – 3:32
10. "Danger" (alternate take, 1980) (Davis, Tim McGovern) – 3:27
11. "Slow Town" (from Careful, 1980) (Davis) – 4:19
12. "Lost but Not Forgotten" (outtake, 1981) (Davis) – 4:27
13. "Only the Lonely" (alternate/early version, 1981) (Davis) – 3:25
14. "Mission of Mercy" (live, 1985) (Davis) – 3:00
15. "Some Things Never Change" (demo, ~1982) (Davis) – 3:28

Disc Two

1. "Surrender" (outtake, 1982) (Davis) – 2:45
2. "Room at the Top" (outtake, 1983) (Davis, Steve Goldstein) – 4:12
3. "Mystery D.J." (outtake, 1983) (Davis, Bernie Taupin) – 3:39
4. "Suddenly Last Summer" (alternate take, 1983) (Davis) – 4:33
5. "Remember the Nights" (live on Saturday Night Live, 1984) (Davis, Scott Thurston) – 3:25
6. "Love and Affection" (Martha Davis & Sly Stone, from the film Soul Man, 1986) (Joan Armatrading) – 4:32
7. "Nightmares" (Martha Davis, from the film Night of the Creeps, 1986) (Davis, Kevin Gilbert) – 4:38
8. "In the Jungle (Concrete Jungle)" (from the film Teachers, 1984) (The Motels) – 3:59
9. "I Can't Believe" (Martha Davis, from the film Miracle Beach, 1992) (Davis, Eric Allaman) – 2:42
10. "Take My Breath Away" (demo by Martha Davis, for the film Top Gun, 1986) (Giorgio Moroder, Tom Whitlock) – 3:52
11. "We Never Danced" (from the film Made in Heaven, 1987) (Neil Young) – 4:23
12. "Next in Line" (demo, by Martha Davis, 1986) (Davis) – 4:31
13. "Save the Last Dance for Love" (B-Side to "Shame", 1985) ( Davis) – 4:22
14. "Shame" (demo, by Martha Davis, 1984) (Davis) – 4:47
15. "Crazy" (demo, by Martha Davis, 1989) (Willie Nelson) – 2:38
16. "You Got What It Takes" (Martha Davis) (Davis & Ivan Neville, from the film A Smile Like Yours, 1997) – 3:23
17. "Coco and John" (hidden track by Martha Davis) (Davis) – 3:18
