= Atomic Cafe: Greatest Songs Live =

Live album by The Motels
- Released: 2009
- Recorded: 1979 & 1980
- Genre: New wave
- Length: 1:07:44
- Label: Fuel 2000 Records
- Producer: Martha Davis

The Motels chronology
This (2008)	Atomic Cafe: Greatest Songs Live (2009)

Atomic Cafe: Greatest Songs Live is the second live album released by the band The Motels, recorded live in Boston in 1979 & 1980.

== Track listing ==
- All songs written by Martha Davis, except where noted.
1. "Atomic Cafe" – 2:58
2. "Closets and Bullets" – 4:43
3. "Kix" – 2:16
4. "Celia" – 3:06
5. "Total Control" (Davis, Jeff Jourard) – 5:26
6. "People, Places and Things" – 3:54
7. "Porn Reggae / The Big Hurt" (Davis / Wayne Shanklin) – 6:30
8. "Dressing Up" (Davis, J. Jourard) – 5:04
9. "Careful" (Marty Jourard, Michael Goodroe) – 3:09
10. "Days Are OK (But the Nights Are Made for Love) / Atomic Cafe (version 2)" (Tim McGovern / Davis) – 6:38
11. "Bonjour Baby" (M. Jourard, Goodroe) – 3:21
12. "Whose Problem?" – 3:33
13. "Cry Baby" (M. Jourard, Goodroe) – 4:06
14. "Danger" (Davis, McGovern) – 4:35
15. "Party Professionals" – 4:07
16. "Anticipating" – 4:18
