= Shock (The Motels song) =

1985 single by the Motels

Single by The Motels

from the album Shock
- B-side: "In the Jungle (Concrete Jungle)"
- Released: 1985
- Length: 4:09
- Label: Capitol
- Songwriters: Martha Davis; Scott Thurston
- Producer: Richie Zito

The Motels singles chronology
"Shame" (1985)	"Shock" (1985)	"Icy Red" (1985)

"Shock" is a song by American new wave band The Motels, released in 1985 as the second single from their fifth studio album, Shock. The song was written by Martha Davis and Scott Thurston, and produced by Richie Zito. "Shock" peaked at number 84 on the US Billboard Hot 100.

== Music video ==
The song's music video was directed by David Fincher. It achieved light rotation on MTV.

== Critical reception ==
On its release, Billboard noted the "clean, sharp dance sound, with Davis squarely out front". Cash Box described it as a "heavily percussive cut" which "has all the raw urgency and dynamic tension [of] this band's uptempo tunes". In a review of Shock, J. A. White of The Morning Call considered it to have "a basic, hard Pat Benatar-like sound with some Michael Jackson touches and oriental synth-funk embellishments here and there".

== Track listing ==
7–inch single

1. "Shock" (Remix) – 4:09
2. "In the Jungle (Concrete Jungle)" – 3:59

7–inch promotional single (US)

1. "Shock" (Remix) – 4:09
2. "Shock" (Remix) – 4:09

12–inch single (France)

1. "Shock" – 6:51
2. "Shock" (Instrumental) – 5:41

12–inch promotional single (US)

1. "Shock" – 4:27
2. "Shock" – 4:27

== Personnel ==
Credits are adapted from the Shock LP inner sleeve notes and 12-inch single sleeve notes.

The Motels

- Martha Davis – vocals
- Marty Jourard – keyboards
- Michael Goodroe – bass
- Brian Glascock – drums
- Guy Perry – guitar
- Scott Thurston – keyboards, guitar

Production

- Richie Zito – producer (all tracks), remixer ("Shock")
- Brian Reeves – engineer on "Shock"
- Steve Thompson, Michael Barbiero – remixers (12-inch extended mix of "Shock")

== Charts ==
Chart (1985)	Peak position
US Billboard Hot 100	84
US Cash Box Top 100 Singles	83
