= Remember the Nights =

1983 single by the Motels

Single by The Motels

from the album Little Robbers
- B-side: "Killing Time"
- Released: November 1983
- Length: 3:05
- Label: Capitol
- Songwriters: Martha Davis; Scott Thurston
- Producer: Val Garay

The Motels singles chronology
"Suddenly Last Summer" (1983)	"Remember the Nights" (1983)	"Footsteps" (1984)

"Remember the Nights" is a song by American new wave band The Motels, which was released in November 1983 as the second single from their fourth studio album Little Robbers. The song was written by Martha Davis and Scott Thurston, and produced by Val Garay. "Remember the Nights" peaked at number 36 on the US Billboard Hot 100.

== Music video ==
The song's music video was directed by Val Garay and produced by Tony Basile. It achieved heavy rotation on MTV.

== Critical reception ==
On its release, Billboard listed the song as one of their "Pop picks" and wrote, "Still torchy and dramatic, but the beat is peppier than in 'Suddenly Last Summer'." Cash Box felt the song took a "tougher stance" in comparison to the band's previous chart successes. They noted that it "recalls the band's earlier rock sound" and added that Davis "nearly steps into Pat Benatar territory". They considered the "tight arrangement and cool saxophone" to make the song a "Top 10 natural" and also noted that "faint synths provide an airy touch".

== Track listing ==
7–inch single

1. "Remember the Nights" – 3:05
2. "Killing Time" – 3:37

7–inch single (Brazil)

1. "Remember the Nights" – 3:05
2. "Suddenly Last Summer" – 3:45

7–inch promotional single (US)

1. "Remember the Nights" – 3:05
2. "Remember the Nights" – 3:05

12–inch promotional single (US)

1. "Remember the Nights" – 3:11
2. "Remember the Nights" – 3:11

== Personnel ==
Credits are adapted from the Little Robbers LP inner sleeve notes and 7-inch single sleeve notes.

The Motels

- Martha Davis – vocals
- Marty Jourard – keyboards, saxophone
- Michael Goodroe – bass
- Brian Glascock – drums
- Guy Perry – guitar
- Scott Thurston – keyboards, guitar

Production

- Val Garay – producer

== Charts ==
Chart (1983–84)	Peak position
US Billboard Hot 100	36
US Rock Top Tracks (Billboard)	12
US Cash Box Top 100 Singles	37
