= Forever Mine (song) =

1982 single by the Motels

Single by The Motels

from the album All Four One
- B-side: "So L.A."
- Released: October 1982
- Length: 3:22
- Label: Capitol
- Songwriter: Martha Davis
- Producer: Val Garay

The Motels singles chronology
"Take the L" (1982)	"Forever Mine" (1982)	"Art Fails" (1983)

"Forever Mine" is a song by American new wave band The Motels, which was released in 1982 as the third single from their third studio album All Four One. The song was written by Martha Davis and produced by Val Garay. "Forever Mine" peaked at number 60 on the US Billboard Hot 100.

== Background ==
In a 1982 interview with The Boston Globe, Davis described "Forever Mine" as "the first happy song of my career", adding that at that point in her life she was "so in love and so happy".

== Critical reception ==
On its release, Cash Box commented that "Forever Mine" "showcases the urgent power in Martha Davis' voice that gives The Motels its distinctive sound". They added that the song is "suitable for a wide range of formats" and "should continue the group's upward climb".

== Track listing ==
7–inch single

1. "Forever Mine" – 3:22
2. "So L.A." – 3:36

7–inch promotional single (US)

1. "Forever Mine" – 3:22
2. "Forever Mine" – 3:22

== Personnel ==
Credits are adapted from the All Four One LP inner sleeve notes and 7-inch single sleeve notes.

The Motels

- Martha Davis – vocals
- Marty Jourard – keyboards
- Michael Goodroe – bass
- Brian Glascock – drums
- Guy Perry – guitar

Production

- Val Garay – producer

== Charts ==
Chart (1982)	Peak position
US Billboard Hot 100	60
US Cash Box Top 100 Singles	64
