= Silverlight (disambiguation) =

Silverlight or Silver Light may refer to:

- Microsoft Silverlight, a web browser plugin
- Terry Silverlight, American musician
- Silver Light, a 1990 novel by David Thomson
- Silver Light, a 2012 Lali Puna EP

== See also ==
- Yinguang (Silver Light) Theater, original name of the Shanghai Opera Theater
- Silver Lights, a track on Nine on a Ten Scale, Sammy Hagar's 1976 debut album
