= Made in Heaven (1987 film) =

1987 film by Alan Rudolph

- Original movie poster
- Directed by: Alan Rudolph
- Written by: Bruce A. Evans; Raynold Gideon
- Produced by: David Blocker; Bruce A. Evans; Raynold Gideon
- Starring: Timothy Hutton; Kelly McGillis; Maureen Stapleton; Ann Wedgeworth; Mare Winningham; Don Murray; Amanda Plummer
- Cinematography: Jan Kiesser
- Edited by: Tom Walls
- Music by: Mark Isham
- Distributed by: Lorimar Filmed Entertainment
- Release date: November 6, 1987
- Running time: 102 minutes
- Country: United States
- Language: English
- Budget: $13 million or $10 million
- Box office: $4,573,000

Made in Heaven is a 1987 American romantic fantasy comedy film directed by Alan Rudolph, script from Bruce A. Evans and Raynold Gideon, and produced by Lorimar Productions. The film stars Timothy Hutton and Kelly McGillis and has cameos by Tom Petty, Ric Ocasek in his film debut, Ellen Barkin and Neil Young. Emmett, a chain-smoking male angel, was played by Debra Winger (Hutton's then wife), but the character was only credited as being played by "Himself."

The original music score was composed by Mark Isham. The film was marketed with the tagline "How in Heaven did they meet? How on Earth will they find each other?"

Made in Heaven concerns two souls who cross paths in Heaven and then attempt to reconnect once they are reborn on Earth.

== Plot ==
In a small Pennsylvania town in 1957, Mike Shea (Hutton) dreams of escaping small-town life and moving to California with his girlfriend Brenda Carlucci. But Brenda leaves him with his motor running and Mike takes off alone.

On the way to California, Mike rescues a woman and her children from their car that went into a river, but he drowns in the process. Finding himself in Heaven, his Aunt Lisa greets him, and explains the rules and regulations. While searching for someone he used to know, Mike comes across heavenly guide Annie Packert (McGillis), and instantly they fall in love.

Unlike Mike, Annie has not yet lived on Earth, so their love is interrupted just as they are going to perform a wedding ceremony. As she has not yet earned her wings on Earth, she must leave on a tour of duty and put in time inhabiting a human body.

Mike is beside himself with despair, but the heavenly powers, in the form of Emmett Humbird, chain-smoking and sporting an orange crew-cut, offer him a deal: Mike can return to Earth for 30 years to search for Annie, with the stipulation that neither he nor Annie will remember each other.

Ally, the reincarnation of Annie, names her imaginary friend Mike. She grows up, gets married and writes a book whose protagonist is Mike. Her husband leaves her, and she is disconnected for a time. She dreams and daydreams of Mike, which confuses her, as she's not yet met him in this life.

Mike is reborn as Elmo. When he is 28, Emmett visits him to remind him of his purpose because he is living aimlessly and wasting time. Just conned by a woman, Mike is wandering down the road. Later, he gets a copy of Ally's book.

Mike ends up meeting his original parents while hitchhiking; they are kind to him and buy him a trumpet. As a result, Elmo starts his musical career and ends up writing a hit song that he had been working on in Heaven. The song was "We Never Danced"—one of the last things Annie said to Mike in heaven.

Mike/Elmo ends up finding Ally/Annie on the street at the end of the film, and their eyes lock on one another. It's his 30th birthday—they met in the nick of time.

== Cast ==
Actor	Role
Timothy Hutton	Mike Shea/Elmo Barnett
Kelly McGillis	Annie Packert/Ally Chandler
Maureen Stapleton	Aunt Lisa
Ann Wedgeworth	Annette Shea
James Gammon	Steve Shea
Mare Winningham	Brenda Carlucci
Don Murray	Ben Chandler
Timothy Daly	Tom Donnelly
David Rasche	Donald Summer
Amanda Plummer	Wiley Foxx
Willard E. Pugh	Guy Blanchard/Brian Dutton
Marj Dusay	Mrs. Packert
Tom Petty	Stanky
Ellen Barkin	Lucille (uncredited)
Debra Winger	Emmett Humbird (credited as "Himself")
Ric Ocasek	Shark (Mechanic)
Neil Young	Truck Driver
Tom Robbins	Mario the Toymaker

== Production ==
=== Development ===
The film was based on an original script by Bruce A. Evans and Raynold Gideon, who wrote Starman and Stand by Me. The movie was originally set up at Embassy Pictures who were financing Stand by Me, but then transferred to Lorimar Motion Pictures, a division of Lorimar Telepictures. The movie was offered to Alan Rudolph, who said "I didn't really want to make" the film "but they said I could interpret and embellish it. It was a very good script, but schmaltzy." He called it "the kind of film I never would have written on my own. But there was something about it that appealed to me, so I was allowed to bring my process to something else."

According to Rudolph, he agreed to make the movie if he could add a "dark edge" and "make the audience pay for the romantic reward." He also said he insisted on no special effects and the producers agreed.

=== Shooting ===
Filming began on March 21, 1986 with three weeks shooting in Charleston, South Carolina, then six weeks in Atlanta. Debra Winger accompanied husband Timothy Hutton on set and agreed to play a small role.

Rudolph recalled the ending "the last ten minutes, was as good as anything that I'd done to that point." He described this sequence as a struggle between God (Debra Winger) and the Devil (Ellen Barkin) over Hutton's character after he had had been hit by a car "and it was the best shot I'd ever done in my life. We shot it in Atlanta as the sun was going down and it was this huge traffic scene and then you close in, he gets hit, and you pull back and nobody's there–all in one shot–and oh it was fantastic."

=== Post Production ===
After a test screening, Rudolph claimed the writers tried to have him fired. "What followed was six months of battling for this thing," said Rudolph. "I had to give up all the darker elements to save the ending which was the best part of the film... Then that got cut out too."

The final ending was a compromise between what Rudolph and the producers wanted. "I'm not disappointed with the movie, I'm disappointed with the process," said Rudolph. "I should never do anyone else's writing." According to Rudolph, "What came out was nobody's vision – it was a studio that had changed hands three or four times and what remained was bowdlerized beyond recognition."

One of the screenwriters, Raynold Gideon, later said:

The difference between what we wrote and what appeared on screen was 180 degrees. Scenes were cut out. Alan Rudolph... didn't want to do the special effects that were called for but decided to do them in camera the old fashioned way... By the time Rudolph got through with it there was no magic and no chemistry. It was flat and there was no special effects, no magical wonderful heaven. That's not the way he works, the way he sees things.

== Reception ==
The film was not a box office success, grossing a little over $4.5 million against a budget of $13 million.

The film's critical reception was mixed. Made in Heaven holds a 56% rating on Rotten Tomatoes based on sixteen reviews. Filmink wrote "the movie had some lovely things but a serious structural flaw where the two leads don’t engage at all in the second half... it’s like the two leads are off in different movies" but felt "McGillis is lovely, Debra Winger fans won’t want to miss her playing an angel."

== Soundtrack ==
Made in Heaven: Original Motion Picture Soundtrack was released through Elektra Records on LP and cassette, but not on CD.

1. Martha Davis (of The Motels) - "We Never Danced" (Neil Young) (also available on The Motels' compilation album Anthologyland (2001))
2. R.E.M. - "Romance" (Bill Berry, Peter Buck, Mike Mills, Michael Stipe) (also available on the compilation album Eponymous (1988))
3. Ric Ocasek - "I Still Want You" (Ric Ocasek)
4. Luther Vandross - "There's Only You" (Luther Vandross) (an early demo version is available on the compilation album Love, Luther (2007))
5. The Nylons - "Up the Ladder to the Roof" (Frank Wilson, Vincent DiMirco) (from the album One Size Fits All (1982))
6. Buffalo Springfield - "Mr. Soul" (Neil Young) (from the album Buffalo Springfield Again (1967))
7. Buffalo Springfield - "I Am a Child" (Neil Young) (from the album Last Time Around (1968))
8. Mark Isham - "Same Time, Another Place"
9. Mark Isham - "Beyond the Frames"
10. Mark Isham - "Instead of Floating"

Pre-recorded songs from the film that were not on the soundtrack album:

- Sly and the Family Stone - "If You Want Me to Stay" (Sly Stone)
- Buffalo Springfield - "For What It's Worth" (Stephen Stills)
- Alberta Hunter - "Long May We Love" (Grace Freed, Roc Hillman)
- Hank Williams - "Why Should We Try Anymore" (Hank Williams)
- Ernest Tubb and Red Foley - "Goodnight, Irene" (Lead Belly)

== Other media ==
In 1988, the film was released on VHS format as well as digital stereo LaserDisc format. In 2009, the film made its DVD debut as part of the Warner Archive Collection.

== See also ==
- List of films about angels
