= Only the Lonely (The Motels song) =

Single by The Motels

from the album All Four One
- B-side: "Change My Mind"
- Released: April 1982
- Recorded: 1981
- Genre: New wave; pop rock
- Length: 3:16
- Label: Capitol
- Songwriter: Martha Davis
- Producer: Val Garay

The Motels singles chronology
"Whose Problem?" (1980)	"Only the Lonely" (1982)	"Take the L" (1982)

Music video
- "Only the Lonely" on YouTube

"Only the Lonely" is a song by American new wave band The Motels, released in April 1982 by Capitol Records as the first single from their third studio album, All Four One (1982). Propelled by a popular music video, it debuted at number 90 on the US Billboard Hot 100 on April 24, 1982. It would ultimately climb to number nine on July 17 of that year where it spent four weeks in that position. On the US Cash Box Top 100, it performed slightly better, peaking at number eight for two weeks.

== Development ==
The Motels initially recorded darker pieces for their anticipated third studio album. However, with the exception of a reworked "Only the Lonely", the rest of the songs were shelved. The unreleased songs would eventually be featured on the 2011 album Apocalypso.

Lead singer Martha Davis wrote "Only the Lonely" on a guitar that was given to her by her late father—an administrator at the University of California, Berkeley, who found the instrument in Stiles Hall on the campus. She explained the song's inspiration in an interview with Beyond Race magazine:

"...It's a song about empty success. It came about while the Motels were experiencing critical acclaim, traveling the world, riding in limos, and yet I was probably as sad as I had ever been. I was in a horrible relationship and had not yet recovered from my parents' death (I doubt one ever does). The contradiction of these two worlds was where 'Only the Lonely' lived... bittersweet."

In a 2019 interview, she contrasted the song's development process with her later hit "Suddenly Last Summer":

"'Those two songs couldn't be more opposite," she said. "With ‘Only the Lonely’ I picked up my guitar and (the tune) was sitting there (as if it wrote itself). I played ‘Only the Lonely’ bada-boom, bada-boom.'"

== Music video ==
The music video for "Only the Lonely" was directed by Australian filmmaker Russell Mulcahy. Martha Davis stars in the vintage-style video as a socialite who is frequenting the bar at a posh hotel. Eventually, a once solitary Davis becomes overwhelmed by the jubilation of an increasingly unstable crowd. The video earned the award "Best Performance in a Music Video" at the American Music Awards.

== Critical reception ==
In the UK, Geoff Barton of Sounds praised "Only the Lonely" as a "beautifully crafted song, ebbing, flowing, elegiac and containing a supremely sensuous performance from vocalist Martha Davis".

== Track listing ==
- US 7" single
1. "Only the Lonely" – 3:16
2. "Change My Mind" – 3:21

== Charts ==
=== Weekly charts ===
Chart (1982)	Peak position
Australia (Kent Music Report)	28
Canada Top Singles (RPM)	21
New Zealand (Recorded Music NZ)	10
US Billboard Hot 100	9
US Adult Contemporary (Billboard)	27
US Mainstream Rock (Billboard)	10
US Cash Box Top 100	8

=== Year-end charts ===
Chart (1982)	Rank
US Billboard Hot 100	29
US Cash Box Top 100	49
