= We Are the World (album) =

1985 studio album by USA for Africa and various artists

Studio album by USA for Africa and various artists
- Released: April 1, 1985
- Genre: Pop; rock; soul; R&B
- Length: 41:37
- Label: Columbia/CBS (LP); PolyGram (CD)
- Producer: Quincy Jones; Various

Singles from We Are the World
- 1. "We Are the World" Released: March 7, 1985; 2. "Tears Are Not Enough" Released: May 1, 1985

We Are the World is a 1985 album that contains USA for Africa's "We Are the World", a superstar charity recording for famine relief efforts in Ethiopia. The album was released on April 1, 1985, on LP by Columbia Records and on CD by PolyGram.

In addition to the title track, the album includes nine previously unreleased songs by donating artists, including Prince, Steve Perry, Chicago, Bruce Springsteen and the E Street Band (a rendition of Jimmy Cliff's obscure "Trapped" recorded live at Meadowlands Arena on their Born in the U.S.A. Tour, which achieved considerable album-oriented rock radio airplay and topped the Mainstream Rock chart), Tina Turner and others.

The album also includes another famine relief fundraising song, "Tears Are Not Enough", which was performed by Canadian supergroup Northern Lights.

Prince and The Revolution recorded "4 the Tears in Your Eyes" for the album. A rare live version of the song, done for Live Aid, was included on Prince's The Hits/The B-Sides.

Chicago's contribution, "Good for Nothing", would be the last single released with bass player Peter Cetera's lead vocals before he left the band. It was later included on the band's comprehensive 2003 compilation, The Box.

The album was nominated for the Grammy Award for Album of the Year in 1986.

== Critical reception ==
Professional ratings
Review scores
| Source | Rating |
|---|---|
| AllMusic | 2/5 stars |

The album sold over three million copies. On April 27, 1985, it reached number one on Billboard's Top Pop Albums in only two weeks, something that had last been accomplished in 1981 by the Rolling Stones album Tattoo You.

== Track listing ==
Side one
| No. | Title | Writer(s) | Producer(s) | Length |
|---|---|---|---|---|
| 1. | "We Are the World" (performed by USA for Africa) | Michael Jackson; Lionel Richie | Quincy Jones | 7:02 |
| 2. | "If Only for the Moment, Girl" (performed by Steve Perry) | Randy Goodrum; S. Perry | Goodrum; S. Perry | 3:44 |
| 3. | "Just a Little Closer" (performed by The Pointer Sisters) | Robbie Nevil; Mark Mueller | Richard Perry | 3:53 |
| 4. | "Trapped" (performed by Bruce Springsteen & the E Street Band) (Live at Meadowlands, August 6, 1984) | Jimmy Cliff | Springsteen; Chuck Plotkin | 5:11 |

Side two
| No. | Title | Writer(s) | Producer(s) | Length |
|---|---|---|---|---|
| 5. | "Tears Are Not Enough" (performed by Northern Lights) | David Foster; Bryan Adams; Jim Vallance; Rachel Paiement (French lyrics) | Foster | 4:21 |
| 6. | "4 the Tears in Your Eyes" (performed by Prince and the Revolution) | Prince | Prince | 2:45 |
| 7. | "Good for Nothing" (performed by Chicago) | Richard Marx; Robert Lamm; Foster | Foster | 3:35 |
| 8. | "Total Control" (performed by Tina Turner) | Martha Davis; Jeff Jourard | John S. Carter | 3:38 |
| 9. | "A Little More Love" (recorded by Kenny Rogers) | Thom Schuyler; J. Fred Knobloch | David Malloy | 2:54 |
| 10. | "Trouble in Paradise" (performed by Huey Lewis and the News) (Live in San Francisco on February 21, 1985) | Huey Lewis; Johnny Colla; Bill Gibson; Chris Hayes; Sean Hopper; Mario Cipollina | Huey Lewis and the News | 4:34 |
| Total length: | | | | 41:37 |

== Personnel ==
- Executive producer: Ken Kragen
- Album supervisor: Humberto Gatica

== Charts ==
=== Weekly charts ===
Weekly chart performance for We Are the World
| Chart (1985) | Peak position |
|---|---|
| Australian Albums (Kent Music Report) | 6 |
| Austrian Albums (Ö3 Austria) | 5 |
| Dutch Albums (Album Top 100) | 1 |
| German Albums (Offizielle Top 100) | 8 |
| New Zealand Albums (RMNZ) | 6 |
| Norwegian Albums (VG-lista) | 1 |
| Swedish Albums (Sverigetopplistan) | 4 |
| Swiss Albums (Schweizer Hitparade) | 1 |
| UK Albums (Official Charts) | 31 |
| US Billboard 200 | 1 |
| US Top R&B/Hip-Hop Albums (Billboard) | 6 |

=== Year-end charts ===
Year-end chart performance for We Are the World
| Chart (1985) | Position |
|---|---|
| Dutch Albums (Album Top 100) | 59 |
| Swiss Albums (Schweizer Hitparade) | 10 |
| US Billboard 200 | 76 |

== Certifications and sales ==
Certifications and sales for We Are the World
| Region | Certification | Certified units/sales |
|---|---|---|
| Brazil | — | 850,000 |
| France (SNEP) | Gold | 100,000 |
| New Zealand (RMNZ) | Platinum | 15,000^{^} |
| United States (RIAA) | 3× Platinum | 3,000,000^{^} |
^{^} Shipments figures based on certification alone.
