= If Not Now Then When =

Compilation album by The Motels and Martha Davis
- Released: March 10, 2017
- Recorded: 2002–2006
- Genre: New wave
- Length: 1:37:39
- Label: Sunset Blvd Records

The Motels and Martha Davis chronology
Apocalypso (2011)	If Not Now Then When (2017)	The Last Few Beautiful Days (2018)

If Not Now Then When is a compilation album containing material from the new wave band, The Motels, plus solo work by Martha Davis. This two disc album is a collection of twenty-seven rare tracks, demos, and recent recordings spanning 2002 to 2006, and outtakes from Davis' solo albums ...So the Story Goes and Beautiful Life. Fifteen of the tracks are previously unreleased.

== Track listing ==
Disc 1
No.	Title	Writer(s)	Length
1.	"If Not Now Then When"	Martha Davis, Nick Johns, Clint Walsh, Eric Gardner	3:32
2.	"King of Crime"	Davis	2:43
3.	"St. Marks Place"	Davis, Earl Slick	2:31
4.	"Ringtones"	Davis	5:42
5.	"Been to That Movie"	Davis, Johns, Walsh, Gardner	4:46
6.	"Beautiful Life"	Davis	2:46
7.	"Sally"	Davis	4:41
8.	"Let Me Fall"	Davis	3:49
9.	"The Cat / Out of the Corner of My Eye"	Davis, Slick	4:31
10.	"Speechless People"	Davis	2:28
11.	"Cowgirl"	Davis	2:52
12.	"Fun for You"	Davis, Johns, Walsh, Gardner, Jon Siebels	4:33
13.	"Lynk / How Good It Feels"	Davis, Slick	3:00
Total length:			47:54

Disc 2
No.	Title	Writer(s)	Length
1.	"Outta Reach"	Davis, Johns, Walsh, Gardner, Jon Siebels	3:03
2.	"Precious Doe"	Davis	4:05
3.	"I Didn't Come"	Jesse Harris	2:49
4.	"Teeth"	Davis	4:29
5.	"She Said to Herself"	Davis	2:24
6.	"Good Girl Bad Luck"	Davis	4:19
7.	"You Can Cry If You Wanna"	Davis, Johns, Walsh, Gardner	3:49
8.	"The Rain"	Davis	4:52
9.	"Walk Away"	Davis	3:24
10.	"Miss Lonely Hearts"	Davis	4:13
11.	"Crying Eyes"	Davis, Slick	2:31
12.	"I Can Take It"	Davis	2:51
13.	"Watching the World"	Davis	4:14
14.	"Grizzly / Look Out Now"	Davis, Slick	2:42
Total length:			49:45
