= Days Are OK =

1980 song by the Motels

Single by The Motels

from the album Careful
- B-side: "Envy"
- Released: 1980
- Genre: New wave
- Length: 3:32
- Label: Capitol
- Songwriter: Tim McGovern
- Producer: Carter

The Motels singles chronology
"Anticipating" (1980)	"Days Are OK" (1980)	"Danger" (1980)

"Days Are OK", also known as "Days Are OK (But the Nights Were Made for Love)", is a song by American new wave band The Motels, which was released in 1980 as the first single from their second studio album Careful. The song was written by Tim McGovern and produced by Carter.

Released in the UK and certain European countries only, "Days Are OK" was originally issued as a single in May 1980, but it failed to chart. It was reissued in the UK on 21 November 1980 and reached number 41 in the UK Singles Chart in January 1981, giving the band their second and final UK chart entry.

== Promotion ==
To promote the November 1980 reissue, the band spent two weeks in the UK for a seven-date tour and also performed the song and "Envy" on BBC's The Old Grey Whistle Test on 29 November. The band's concert at Bradford University on 10 December was filmed for broadcast as part of the BBC series Rock Goes to College.

== Critical reception ==
In a review of the November 1980 reissue, Mike Gardner of Record Mirror wrote, "This came on like a cross between Hazel O'Connor, Pat Benatar and Ronnie Spector. Surprisingly the mixture doesn't suffer too badly as a result, but it doesn't demand that you listen again."

== Track listing ==
7–inch single (UK, Germany, France, Netherlands and Italy)

1. "Days Are OK (But the Nights Were Made for Love)" – 3:32
2. "Slow Town" – 4:20

== Personnel ==
Credits are adapted from the Careful LP inner sleeve notes.

The Motels

- Martha Davis – vocals, guitar
- Tim McGovern – guitar
- Marty Jourard – keyboards
- Michael Goodroe – bass
- Brian Glascock – drums

Production

- Carter – producer, engineer
- Warren Dewey – recording
- Richard McKernan – assistant engineer

== Charts ==
Chart (1981)	Peak position
UK Singles (Official Charts)	41
