= Take the L =

Take the L may refer to:

- "Take the L" (The Motels song), 1982
  - "Take The L Out of Liver", a parody song by "Weird Al" Yankovic
- "Take the L", a 2006 song by Tanya Morgan
- "Take the L", an emote in Fortnite which uses the Loser gesture

== See also ==
- Chicago "L", the rapid transit system serving Chicago, U.S.
- L (New York City Subway service), U.S.
- "Take The L Train (To B'klyn)" and "Take The L Train (To 8th Ave.)", 1995 songs by Brooklyn Funk Essentials
