= All Four One =

Studio album by the Motels
- Released: April 5, 1982
- Recorded: 1981–82
- Studio: Record One (Los Angeles)
- Genre: New wave
- Length: 33:02
- Label: Capitol
- Producer: Val Garay

The Motels chronology
Careful (1980)	All Four One (1982)	Little Robbers (1983)

Singles from All Four One
- 1. "Mission of Mercy" Released: 1982; 2. "Only the Lonely" Released: 1982; 3. "Take the L" Released: 1982; 4. "Forever Mine" Released: 1982; 5. "Art Fails" Released: 1983

Professional ratings
Review scores
Source	Rating
AllMusic	4/5 stars

All Four One is the third studio album by new wave band the Motels, released in 1982. It features the Top 10 hit "Only the Lonely", and the follow-up hit "Take the L". Both songs were assisted by popular MTV music videos. The album was recorded and mixed digitally.

== Background and writing ==
After the minor success of Careful, the Motels went back into the studio in early 1981 to record their third album with producer Val Garay. The band at this time consisted of Martha Davis on vocals and guitar, Tim McGovern on lead guitar, Marty Jourard on keyboards, Michael Goodroe on bass and Brian Glascock on drums.

Wanting to stretch the limits as to what they could do artistically and musically, the band recorded some of its darkest and heaviest music to date. McGovern, Davis' boyfriend at the time, clashed with Garay in the studio, and ended up de facto producer and arranger for the album, which was titled Apocalypso. Martha Davis considers this period "the last time the Motels were uninhibited, wild, and not worried about our place on the charts."

Neither the band nor Garay ever submitted any of the recordings to Capitol Records while the recording process was underway. When the record company heard the finished product, they rejected it for being "not commercial enough" and "too weird", and Apocalypso was scrapped. The band attempted to go back and re-record the entire album but in the process, Davis and McGovern's relationship dissolved and by December 1981 McGovern was no longer in the band.

With McGovern gone, Garay took a different approach with the re-recording process, utilizing studio musicians throughout the album, and molding the final product to a more commercially appealing sound. Several band members were used sparingly or not at all on the final recordings; in particular, studio drummer Craig Krampf replaced Brian Glascock on all tracks, Waddy Wachtel was featured on guitar in place of the departed McGovern, and the bass slot on several tracks was filled by one of two session players in place of Michael Goodroe. Adrian Peritore (who went by the name Guy Perry because his former producer had misspelled his name on an album cover) was hired in late January as an official band member, and played lead guitar on some of the tracks. Six Apocalypso tracks were completely re-recorded for the new album, while four new tracks were added (including the hit "Take the L", and a cover of the Goffin/King song "He Hit Me (It Felt Like a Kiss)"). The album was renamed All Four One because the band had recorded four albums but one would not be released, and because the four remaining members had stayed together to complete the album. It was released on April 5, 1982, by Capitol Records.

Despite its rough beginnings, All Four One was the first U.S. hit album for The Motels, and was the band's best selling album. The first single from All Four One was "Only the Lonely", which reached No. 9 on the Billboard Hot 100 and No. 27 on the Adult Contemporary chart, as well as No. 6 on the Billboard Top Tracks chart. The song "Mission of Mercy" also received enough airplay to reach No. 23 on the Top Tracks chart. In addition, two other singles, "Take the L" and "Forever Mine", also managed to reach the Billboard Hot 100 (#52 and #60, respectively). The album's release coincided with the emergence of MTV, and music videos were produced for both "Only the Lonely" and "Take the L". Davis won an award in the Best Performance in a Music Video category at the American Music Awards in 1982 for her performance in the "Only the Lonely" video.

Apocalypso was eventually released in August 2011.

== Track listing ==
All songs written by Martha Davis, except where noted.

No.	Title	Writer(s)	Length
1.	"Mission of Mercy"		3:02
2.	"Take the L"	Carter, Davis, Jourard	3:42
3.	"Only the Lonely"		3:16
4.	"Art Fails"	Davis, Tim McGovern	3:12
5.	"Change My Mind"	Davis, Steve Goldstein	3:21
6.	"So L.A."		3:16
7.	"Tragic Surf"	Davis, McGovern	3:32
8.	"Apocalypso"		3:16
9.	"He Hit Me (and It Felt like a Kiss)"	Gerry Goffin, Carole King	2:28
10.	"Forever Mine"		3:22
Total length:			33:02

== Personnel ==
The Motels

- Martha Davis – vocals, guitars
- Marty Jourard – keyboards, saxophone
- Guy Perry – guitars, backing vocals (9)
- Michael Goodroe – bass
- Brian Glascock – drums, percussion

Additional musicians

- Steve Goldstein – keyboards
- Craig Hull – guitars
- Waddy Wachtel – guitars
- Tim McGovern – guitars (7)
- Bryan Garofalo – bass
- Bob Getter – 6-string bass
- Craig Krampf – drums, percussion
- M.L. Benoit – percussion
- Kobla Ladzekpo – African percussion

=== Production ===
- Val Garay – producer, recording
- Niko Bolas – assistant engineer
- Mike Reese – mastering
- Doug Sax – mastering
- The Mastering Lab (Hollywood, California) – mastering location
- Roy Kohara – art direction
- Henry Marquez – art direction
- Jules Bates for Artrouble – photography
- Michelle Bűhler – make-up

== Charts ==
=== Weekly charts ===
Chart (1982)	Peak position
Australia (Kent Music Report)	20
Canada Albums	39
'U.S.' Billboard 200	16

=== Year-end charts ===
Chart (1982)	Position
New Zealand Albums (RMNZ)	32
U.S. Billboard 200	51
