= Turn On Your Radar =

Single by Prism

from the album Small Change
- Released: 1982
- Genre: Pop; pop rock
- Length: 3:14
- Label: Capitol
- Songwriter: Morgan Walker
- Producer: John S. Carter

Prism singles chronology
"Don't Let Him Know" (1981)	"Turn On Your Radar" (1982)	"Rain" (1982)

Official audio
- "Turn On Your Radar" on YouTube

"Turn On Your Radar" is the nineteenth single by Canadian rock band Prism. It was released in 1982 by Capitol Records, as the second single from the band's fifth studio album, Small Change. It is notably the band's follow up to the hit "Don't Let Him Know", and their second and final single to feature Henry Small as their lead vocalist, after replacing Ron Tabak.

== Release ==
The song was a commercial disappointment peaking at a poor chart position of 64 in the US. The song gained little airplay on album-oriented rock or adult-contemporary radio formats in the US.

== Personnel ==
Prism

- Henry Small – lead vocals
- Lindsay Mitchell – guitars
- Rocket Norton – drums
- Al Harlow – bass guitar

== Charts ==
Chart (1982)	Peak position
U.S. Billboard Hot 100	64
