= Little Robbers =

Studio album by the Motels
- Released: September 16, 1983
- Recorded: February – August 1983
- Studio: Record One (Los Angeles)
- Genre: New wave; pop rock
- Length: 36:35
- Label: Capitol
- Producer: Val Garay

The Motels chronology
All Four One (1982)	Little Robbers (1983)	Shock (1985)

Singles from Little Robbers
- 1. "Suddenly Last Summer" Released: August 1983; 2. "Remember the Nights" Released: November 1983; 3. "Footsteps" Released: 1983

Professional ratings
Review scores
Source	Rating
AllMusic	3.5/5 stars

Little Robbers is the RIAA Gold-certified fourth studio album by new wave band the Motels. It was recorded between February and August 1983 and released on September 16 of that year.

It features the hit song, "Suddenly Last Summer", which hit No. 1 on Billboard's Album Rock Tracks chart, and became the band's second Top 10 Pop hit in the US, reaching No. 9 on the Billboard Hot 100.

== Track listing ==
Side one
No.	Title	Writer(s)	Length
1.	"Where Do We Go from Here (Nothing Sacred)"	Martha Davis	3:34
2.	"Suddenly Last Summer"	Martha Davis	3:46
3.	"Isle of You"	Martha Davis, Kevin McCormick	4:09
4.	"Trust Me"	Martha Davis	3:23
5.	"Monday Shutdown"	Martha Davis, Steve Goldstein	3:48
Total length:			18:40

Side two
No.	Title	Writer(s)	Length
1.	"Remember the Nights"	Martha Davis, Scott Thurston	3:02
2.	"Little Robbers"	Martha Davis	3:56
3.	"Into the Heartland"	Martha Davis, Bernie Taupin	3:36
4.	"Tables Turned"	Martha Davis, Michael Goodroe	3:37
5.	"Footsteps"	Martha Davis, Steve Goldstein, Bill Wray	3:44
Total length:			17:55

== Singles ==
Year	Month and date	Catalogue number	Single	Chart	Position
1983	August	Capitol Records #5271	"Suddenly Last Summer"	Australia (Kent Music Report)	34
1983	August	Capitol Records #5271	"Suddenly Last Summer"	Canada (RPM Top Singles)	11
1983	August	Capitol Records #5271	"Suddenly Last Summer"	New Zealand	28
1983	August	Capitol Records #5271	"Suddenly Last Summer"	United States (Billboard Hot 100)	9
1983	August	Capitol Records #5271	"Suddenly Last Summer"	United States (Billboard Album Rock Tracks)	1
1983	August	Capitol Records #5271	"Suddenly Last Summer"	United States (Billboard Dance Club Songs)	18
1983	November 18	Capitol Records #5246	"Remember the Nights"	United States (Billboard Hot 100)	36
1983	November 18	Capitol Records #5246	"Remember the Nights"	United States (Billboard Album Rock Tracks)	12
1984	January	Capitol Records HL#1A006-1868357 (Note: This single was released in the Netherlands only)	"Footsteps"	—	—
1984	January	(Note: This song was not released as a single but was among the most-played and requested songs on the relevant radio stations)	"Little Robbers"	United States (Billboard Album Rock Tracks)	18

== Charts ==
Chart (1983)	Peak position
Australia (Kent Music Report)	34

== Personnel ==
Credits are taken from the CD's liner notes.

The Motels

- Martha Davis – vocals, guitars
- Marty Jourard – keyboards, saxophone
- Scott Thurston – keyboards, guitars
- Guy Perry – lead guitars
- Michael Goodroe – bass
- Brian Glascock – drums, percussion

Additional musicians

- Steve Goldstein – keyboards
- Chris Page – synthesizers
- Craig Hull – guitars
- Waddy Wachtel – guitars
- Bob Getter – bass
- Craig Krampf – drums
- Jerry Peterson – saxophone

== Production ==
Credits are taken from the CD's liner notes.

- Val Garay – producer, recording, management
- Richard Bosworth – recording assistant
- Doug Sax – mastering at The Mastering Lab (Hollywood, California)
- John Kosh – art direction, design
- Ron Larson – art direction, design
- Robert Blakeman – photography
