= Whose Problem? =

1980 single by the Motels

Single by The Motels

from the album Careful
- B-side: "Envy"
- Released: 1980
- Length: 3:47
- Label: Capitol
- Songwriter: Martha Davis
- Producer: Carter

The Motels singles chronology
"Danger" (1980)	"Whose Problem?" (1980)	"Only the Lonely" (1982)

"Whose Problem?" is a song by American new wave band The Motels, which was released in 1980 as the third and final single from their second studio album Careful. The song was written by Martha Davis and produced by Carter. "Whose Problem?" failed to chart in the US, but reached number 42 in the UK Singles Chart and number 43 in the Australian Kent Music Report chart.

== Critical reception ==
On its release, Record World commented, "Davis' lyrics are loaded with imagery and it comes to life vividly through her theatrical vocals. The staging is equally colorful with guitar/sax adds." In the UK, Jim Whiteford of The Kilmarnock Standard praised the song as "a stunning mid-tempo rock number" with "just enough similarities to the Pretenders' recent hit to guarantee success". He added, "Dig the guitar sound and the overall production, very pleasing."

Deanne Pearson of Smash Hits commented that the Motels were "a cut above many of their fellow Californian musicians", but felt that they sound "slightly sleepy and sun-soaked, as if they're not stretching themselves to their full capacity". She added, "Davis has a deep, rich, sultry voice with a fine jazzy edge, but sounds a little too blasé, adding to the general laid-back, nonchalant feel of this record." Pauline McLeod of the Daily Mirror commented, "The Motels, a big success in the States, haven't quite made their mark here yet. I'm not sure if this is the one to do it for them." Mike Nicholls of Record Mirror was more critical of the song, noting that Davis was "trying to sound like Sandie Shaw" over "a mis-matched backing track".

== Track listing ==
7–inch single (US and Canada)

1. "Whose Problem?" – 3:47
2. "Envy" – 3:25

7–inch promotional single (US)

1. "Whose Problem?" – 3:50
2. "Whose Problem?" – 3:50

7–inch single (UK, Ireland, the Netherlands, Australia and New Zealand)

1. "Whose Problem?" – 3:47
2. "Cry Baby" – 3:24

7–inch promotional single (Spain)

1. "Whose Problem?" – 3:51
2. "Envy" – 3:25

== Personnel ==
Credits are adapted from the Careful LP inner sleeve notes.

The Motels

- Martha Davis – vocals, guitar
- Tim McGovern – guitar
- Marty Jourard – keyboards, saxophone
- Michael Goodroe – bass
- Brian Glascock – drums

Production

- Carter – producer, engineer
- Warren Dewey – recording
- Richard McKernan – assistant engineer

== Charts ==
Chart (1980)	Peak position
Australia (Kent Music Report)	43
UK Singles (Official Charts)	42
