= Apocalypso (The Motels album) =

Studio album by The Motels
- Released: August 11, 2011
- Recorded: April–August 1981
- Genre: New wave
- Length: 63:39
- Label: Omnivore
- Producer: Val Garay

The Motels chronology
This (2008)	Apocalypso (2011)	If Not Now Then When (2017)

Apocalypso was released in 2011, although it was recorded in 1981 and intended to be the third studio album by the band The Motels.

== Development ==
Apocalypso was recorded between April and August 1981, but was rejected by the Capitol Records promotions department. The re-worked and released album was titled All Four One. Apocalypso remained unreleased until 2011. The album was awarded the best re-issue award by the Independent Music Awards.

== Track listing ==
All tracks are written by Martha Davis, except where noted.

No.	Title	Writer(s)	Length
1.	"Art Fails"	Martha Davis, Tim McGovern	2:58
2.	"Tragic Surf"	Davis, McGovern	3:52
3.	"Only the Lonely"		3:28
4.	"Schneekin'"		4:12
5.	"So L.A."		3:36
6.	"Apocalypso"		4:07
7.	"Mission of Mercy"		3:37
8.	"Lost but Not Forgotten"		4:26
9.	"Who Could Resist That Face"		4:12
10.	"Sweet Destiny"		2:12
11.	"Art Fails" (alternate version)	Davis, McGovern	2:56
12.	"Don't You Remember" (4-track demo)	Michael Goodroe	6:18
13.	"Tragic Surf" (4-track demo)	Davis, McGovern	3:57
14.	"Fiasco" (4-track demo)	Marty Jourard	3:11
15.	"Obvioso" (4-track demo)	Goodroe	3:14
16.	"Only the Lonely" (4-track demo)		3:42
17.	"Only the Lonely" (TV mix)		3:41
Total length:			1:03:39

== Personnel ==
The Motels

- Martha Davis – vocals, rhythm guitar
- Tim McGovern – lead guitar
- Marty Jourard – keyboards, saxophone
- Michael Goodroe – bass
- Brian Glascock – drums

Production Credits are taken from the CD's liner notes.

- Produced by Val Garay
- Produced for Release, 2011 by Cheryl Pawelski
- Arranged by Tim McGovern
- Assistant Production by Niko Bolas
