= Record One =

Recording studio complex

- Type: Recording studio
- Industry: Music
- Founded: 1979; 47 years ago in Los Angeles, U.S.
- Founder: Val Garay
- Headquarters: Los Angeles, United States
- Key people: Dr. Dre

Record One is a recording studio complex in the Sherman Oaks neighborhood of Los Angeles, California. Originally founded in 1979, the studio has been the site of numerous commercially successful and award-winning recordings. Since 2015, Record One has been under the ownership of Dr. Dre and his business partner Larry Chatman.

== History ==
=== 1979–1988 ===
Recording engineer and record producer Val Garay co-founded Record One in 1979 with the financial backing of Melvin Simon. The 7,000 square foot facility, located at 13849 Ventura Boulevard in the Sherman Oaks neighborhood of Los Angeles, included recording studios and rehearsal space.

Kim Carnes' 1981 album, Mistaken Identity was made at Record One. Its lead single, "Bette Davis Eyes", won the Grammy Awards for Song of the Year and Record of the Year the same year.

Other albums recorded at Record One under Garay's ownership included the Tubes 1980 album, The Completion Backward Principle, James Taylor's 1981 album, Dad Loves His Work, Eric Carr's drums on Kiss's 1982 album Creatures of the Night, Olivia Newton-John's 1982 album, Physical, The Motels' 1982 album, All Four One, Steve Perry's 1984 album, Street Talk, Dolly Parton's 1984 album The Great Pretender, Lita Ford's 1987 album, Lita, and portions of Don Henley's 1984 album, Building the Perfect Beast.

Artists who recorded at Record One during this era included Neil Young, Linda Ronstadt, Dan Fogelberg, Roy Orbison, Kenny Rogers, Barbra Streisand, and Toto.

=== 1988–1996 ===
In 1988, Bruce Swedien and Quincy Jones approached Ocean Way Recording founder Allen Sides about an upcoming album project that would have a multitude of high-profile guest artists. Needing additional studio facilities to accommodate such a project, Sides acquired Record One, making it part of the Ocean Way Recording Group. Sides rebuilt the studio's control room, installing a custom Neve mixing console consisting of two 48-input consoles combined with George Massenburg Labs automation. Over the course of the next year, Jones recorded Back on the Block at Ocean Way's Record One. The album went platinum, and won seven Grammy Awards at the 33rd Grammy Awards, including the Grammy Award for Album of the Year and the Grammy Award for Best Engineered Album, Non-Classical.

For approximately one year between 1989 and 1990, Michael Jackson arranged to rent out Record One for $4,000 per day while recording Dangerous, and Bruce Swedien engineered and mixed all but 3 of the songs on the album at the studio.

Prior to beginning work on Michael Jackson's next project, HIStory, Jackson and Swedien wanted an even larger console, so Sides completely revamped Record One Studio A, upgrading the console to a 100-input SSL 8000 G Plus with custom modifications—the largest of its kind in the world at the time—and Studio B to an 80-input SSL 9000 J console, selling the studio's original API console to Herb Alpert. The same year, Quincy Jones recorded his 1995 album, Q's Jook Joint, at the studio.

Bad, Dangerous, HIStory, and Q's Jook Joint were all completed by Bruce Swedien at Record One, with all four albums winning the Grammy for Best Engineered Recording – Non Classical. Together, the four albums have sold in excess of 65 million copies.

Record producer Glen Ballard recorded Wilson Phillips eponymous 1990 debut album in Studio A at Record One. Other artists who recorded at Record One between 1988 and 1996 included Barry White and Earth, Wind & Fire.

=== 1997–present ===
In 1997, hip hop supergroup, The Firm's recorded portions of The Album at Record One. The following year, Rob Cavallo produced two hit songs for the City of Angels (soundtrack) at the studio: "Iris" by the Goo Goo Dolls, and "Uninvited" by Alanis Morissette. Also in 1998, Brandy and Monica recorded the hit song, "The Boy Is Mine" at Record One.

In 2001, Record One was the studio where Busta Rhymes recorded "Break Ya Neck" and where Mary J. Blige recorded "Family Affair". Other artists recording at the studio that same year included Janet Jackson.

Dr. Dre became a long-term client of Record One while launching Aftermath Entertainment, eventually securing all available studio time for approximately five years beginning in 2004. During this time, the studio was the location of production for Dr. Dre's own material like 2001, as well as such albums as 50 Cent's The Massacre, The Game's The Documentary, Jay-Z's Kingdom Come, and Busta Rhymes' the Big Bang. Other artists utilizing Record One for recording, production, or mixing services during this timeframe included Eminem and D12, Snoop Dogg, Eve, and Gwen Stefani.

In 2009, Record One's studios were remodeled and updated again, replacing the SSL G Plus recording console that had been in use in Studio A since 1988 (the console would later be acquired by Mad Muse Studios).

In 2015, long-term Record One client Dr. Dre and his business partner Larry Chatman purchased the studio.
