= Take the L (song) =

1982 single by the Motels

Single by The Motels

from the album All Four One
- B-side: "Mission of Mercy"
- Released: August 1982
- Recorded: 1981
- Length: 3:42
- Label: Capitol
- Songwriters: Marty Jourard; Martha Davis; Carter
- Producer: Val Garay

The Motels singles chronology
"Only the Lonely" (1982)	"Take the L" (1982)	"Forever Mine" (1982)

Music video
- "Take the L" on YouTube

"Take the L" is a song by American new wave band The Motels, which was released in 1982 as the second single from their third studio album All Four One. The song was written by Marty Jourard, Martha Davis and Carter, and produced by Val Garay. "Take the L" peaked at number 52 on the US Billboard Hot 100.

== Background ==
"Take the L" originated with the band's keyboardist and saxophone player Marty Jourard, who had been working on the song for a while. He had a simple progression, but felt "it didn't sound right" until Martha Davis suggested he swap the order of the two chords around. The song's title and repeated line of the chorus ("Take the L out of lover and it's over") came from the producer of the band's first two albums, Carter. During a conversation with the producer, Jourard revealed he was in the process of breaking up with his girlfriend, to which Carter responded with the line. Jourard told the Messenger-Press in 1982, "When I first heard the [line], it was beyond corny, it was almost camp." The Motels recorded "Take the L" in one take on December 7, 1981.

== Music video ==
The song's music video was directed by Russell Mulcahy.

== Critical reception ==
On its release, Cash Box commented, "Here, the songstress' mournful wailings are accompanied by a marching rhythm on the oft-repeated hook. It's undeniably catchy if not exactly upbeat." Jim Whiteford of the Scottish newspaper The Kilmarnock Standard described the song as a "mid-tempo rocker" with a "very reasonable American production". He added, "The band haven't issued anything [in the UK] for over a year, so this new beginning may get them noticed if the radio folk give them some breathing space."

== Track listing ==
7–inch single (US and Canada)

1. "Take the L" – 3:42
2. "Mission of Mercy" – 3:02

7–inch promotional single (US)

1. "Take the L" – 3:42
2. "Take the L" – 3:42

7–inch single (UK, Ireland and the Netherlands)

1. "Take the L (Out of Lover)" – 3:42
2. "Change My Mind" – 3:21

7–inch single (Germany and South Africa)

1. "Take the L" – 3:42
2. "Change My Mind" – 3:21

7–inch single (Australasia and Spain)

1. "Take the L" – 3:42
2. "He Hit Me (And It Felt Like a Kiss)" – 2:28

7–inch single (Japan)

1. "Take the L" – 3:42
2. "So L.A" – 3:35

== Personnel ==
Credits are adapted from the All Four One LP inner sleeve notes.

The Motels

- Martha Davis – vocals
- Marty Jourard – keyboards
- Michael Goodroe – bass
- Brian Glascock – drums
- Guy Perry – guitar

Production

- Val Garay – producer

== Charts ==
Chart (1982)	Peak position
Australia (Kent Music Report)	21
New Zealand (Recorded Music NZ)	44
UK Record Business Bubbling Under Singles 101–150	119
US Billboard Hot 100	52
US Cash Box Top 100 Singles	48
