= Shame (The Motels song) =

1985 single by the Motels

Single by The Motels

from the album Shock
- B-side: "Save the Last Dance for Love"
- Released: July 1985
- Length: 4:04
- Label: Capitol
- Songwriter: Martha Davis
- Producer: Richie Zito

The Motels singles chronology
"In the Jungle" (1984)	"Shame" (1985)	"Shock" (1985)

Music video
- "Shame" on YouTube

"Shame" is a song by American new wave band The Motels, which was released in July 1985 as the lead single from their fifth studio album Shock. The song was written by Martha Davis and produced by Richie Zito. "Shame" peaked at number 21 on the US Billboard Hot 100.

== Background ==
Davis was inspired to write "Shame" by the affairs depicted on various soap operas. Referring to the track in the liner notes of Anthologyland in 2000, Davis commented, "Anyone ever been an adulterer?"

"Shame" provided the band with their fourth and final top 40 entry on the US Billboard Hot 100. Davis told the Chicago Tribune in 1985, "We have an album we're very proud of, and things started off really great. 'Shame' took off with amazing radio response the first two weeks. Then it got up to 21 on the charts and choked."

== Music video ==
The song's music video was directed by David Fincher and produced by Carol Stewart for the production company Z Street Films. Davis' daughter Maria Paschell designed the costumes for her mother in the video.

Davis originally expressed interest in working with director Michael Mann after seeing his 1983 film The Keep. After Mann proved unavailable, Davis' agent recommended Fincher instead. Davis recalled in 2011, "He came in with all these ideas, and it was all beautiful and I said we'll do it." Davis was also impressed by Fincher's directing of Rick Springfield's 1985 concert film The Beat of the Live Drum.

Speaking of the video's premise, Davis said in 1985, "David had this fixation for billboards and he really wanted to use a live image in a billboard. I had this image about this poor, tired, sort of used woman. She's in this seedy motel room and the beautiful, nice twin is up on the billboard beckoning her to give up her shameful existence. She eventually does and off she goes into billboard land."

The video achieved heavy rotation on MTV, and topped the Cash Box Top 30 Music Videos chart for a single week in October 1985. It was also nominated at the 1985 American Video Awards for "Best Pop Video" and "Best Performance, Female".

== Critical reception ==
On its release, Cash Box described "Shame" as "prime Motels material", noting the song's "moody hooks" and Davis' "sultry vocals". They added, "With subtle synth and guitar shadings filling in the spaces, the broken hearted lyric theme is delivered with passion and finesse." Dave Sholin of the Gavin Report noted the lengthy gap between the band's last US single release and "Shame" but commented, "It's evident that Davis took the time to do it right. Zito highlights [her] composition with a strong arrangement."

== Track listing ==
7–inch single

1. "Shame" – 4:04
2. "Save the Last Dance for Love" – 4:19

7–inch promotional single (US)

1. "Shame" – 4:04
2. "Shame" – 4:04

12–inch single

1. "Shame" (Dance Mix) – 7:16
2. "Save the Last Dance for Love" – 4:19
3. "Shame" (Red Mix) – 5:24

12–inch single (New Zealand)

1. "Shame" (Extended Mix) – 7:16
2. "Shame" – 4:04

12–inch promotional single (US)

1. "Shame" (Extended Mix) – 7:16
2. "Shame" – 4:04

== Personnel ==
Credits are adapted from the Shock LP inner sleeve notes and 12-inch single sleeve notes.

The Motels

- Martha Davis – vocals
- Marty Jourard – keyboards
- Michael Goodroe – bass
- Brian Glascock – drums
- Guy Perry – guitar
- Scott Thurston – keyboards, guitar

Production

- Richie Zito – producer
- Paul Sabu – engineer and editing on "Dance Mix" and "Red Mix"
- Rusty Garner – mixing on "Dance Mix" and "Red Mix"

== Charts ==
Chart (1985)	Peak position
Australia (Kent Music Report)	18
Canada Top Singles (RPM)	25
Netherlands (Tipparade)	15
US Billboard Hot 100	21
US Hot Adult Contemporary (Billboard)	22
US Hot Dance/Disco Club Play (Billboard)	14
US Top Rock Tracks (Billboard)	10
US Cash Box Top 100 Singles	25
US AOR Tracks (Radio & Records)	9
