= Nine on a Ten Scale =

Studio album by Sammy Hagar
- Released: May 1976
- Studio: Record Plant (Sausalito)
- Genres: Rock, hard rock
- Length: 37:55
- Label: Capitol
- Producer: Carter

Sammy Hagar chronology
Paper Money (1974)	Nine on a Ten Scale (1976)	Sammy Hagar (1977)

Singles from Nine on a Ten Scale
- 1. "Flamingos Fly" Released: April 1976

Professional ratings
Review scores
Source	Rating
Allmusic	2.5/5 stars

Nine on a Ten Scale is the debut studio album by American musician and songwriter Sammy Hagar, released in May 1976 by Capitol Records. It was his first release as a solo artist after his departure from Montrose in 1975. It was announced in Billboard magazine that Hagar was signed to Capitol Records in January 1976. Nine on a Ten Scale was slated for a February 9 release date.

The album sold poorly and was not successful.

== Song information ==
- "Keep On Rockin'", a Hagar original, was covered by Bette Midler on the classic soundtrack to The Rose, albeit with a different arrangement.
- The track written by Van Morrison, "Flamingos Fly", was not released by Morrison until a year later on his 1977 album A Period of Transition. He gave the song to Hagar after they met at The Record Plant during the recording of the album. Morrison recorded a demo for Hagar which producer John S. Carter, Jr. and Hagar intended to produce as a duet with Morrison, a move which Morrison later rejected. Hagar then re-recorded the song from scratch.
- "China", a track written by the former Fleetwood Mac member Bob Welch, was not released by Welch until after this release. Welch included his version on the 1979 album Three Hearts.
- Ron Nagle's "Please Come Back" was originally included in the film, The Last Detail.
- "Young Girl Blues" is a Donovan cover.
- A demo version of "Rock 'n' Roll Romeo" was released as "Thinking of You" on The Essential Red Collection in 2004.

== Track listing ==
Side one
No.	Title	Writer(s)	Length
1.	"Keep On Rockin'"	John Carter; Sammy Hagar	2:50
2.	"Urban Guerilla"	Carter; Hagar	2:52
3.	"Flamingos Fly"	Van Morrison	4:30
4.	"China"	Bob Welch	3:07
5.	"Silver Lights"	Hagar	5:38

Side two
No.	Title	Writer(s)	Length
6.	"All American"	Hagar	3:53
7.	"Confession (Please Come Back)"	Ronald Nagle	3:17
8.	"Young Girl Blues" (Donovan cover)	Donovan Phillips Leitch	7:50
9.	"Rock 'n' Roll Romeo"	Carter; Hagar	3:47
Total length:			37:55

== Personnel ==
- Sammy Hagar – lead vocals, guitar
- Bill Church – bass guitar
- Scott Quick – guitars
- John Blakely – guitars
- Alan Fitzgerald – keyboards
- Joe Crane – keyboards
- Stan – keyboards
- Wizard – keyboards
- Aynsley Dunbar – drums
- Jim Hodder – drums
- Jerry Shirley – drums
- Dallas Taylor – drums
- Venetta Fields – backing vocals
- Maxayn Lewis – backing vocals
- Sherlie Matthews – backing vocals
- Bob Welch – backing vocals
- Greg Adams – horns
- Emilio Castillo – horns
- Mic Gillette – horns
- Steve Kupka – horns
- Lenny Pickett – horns

Technical

- Rich E. – engineer
- Tom Flye – engineer
- John Henning – engineer
- Gary Kellgren – engineer
- Cris Morris – engineer
- Deke Richards – engineer
- Jimmy Robinson – engineer
- John Stronack – engineer
- Roy Kohara – original art direction
- David Alexander – photography

== Versions ==
- Capitol (US): SN-16049
- Fame (UK): FA 3068
- Capitol (Germany): 1C 038-82 216 (released with the title "Collection")
- BGO (1993 UK reissue): BGOCD182
- One Way Records (1996 US reissue): BGOCD18272438 19095 22
- Repertoire (2000 German reissue): REP 4869

== See also ==
- Sammy Hagar discography
