= Red Frog Presents: 16 Songs for Parents and Children =

Studio album by Martha Davis
- Released: January 2010
- Studio: Clean Sheets Music
- Genre: Children's music
- Length: 24:00
- Producer: Martha Davis

Martha Davis chronology
Beautiful Life (2008)	Red Frog Presents: 16 Songs for Parents and Children (2010)

Red Frog Presents: 16 Songs for Parents and Children is the fourth solo studio album by Martha Davis, who is better known as the lead singer for the band The Motels. Red Frog Presents..., a children's album, is a departure from Davis' other solo albums that explored autobiographical themes. The cover was designed by artist Alicia Justice and depicts a family listening to the radio with the title character Red Frog.

The inspiration for Red Frog Presents... occurred about twelve years before the album's release, as Davis lamented that her grandchildren were listening to Barney & Friends:

"It was just horrifying…especially because when I was a kid, my first favorite album was Igor Stravinsky's The Rite of Spring. I remember seeing Fantasia when I was little, so I know that kids love beautiful, imaginative stuff. The storybooks that I had didn't pull any punches. People died. They didn't try to make everything safe and pretty and stupid for kids."

As a result, the album explores various musical genres such as jazz and baroque. Davis even provides narration and embodies all of the characters on Red Frog Presents.... As she described, "I was a kid of the Warner Brothers cartoons…I grew up with that stuff. I have a crazy imagination, so it seems to make sense. As dark and brooding as some of my songs are, I'm pretty much a goof ball!"

== Track listing ==
Martha Davis (vocals, guitar)

1. "Finnias T. Rabbit"
2. "Dragon Soup"
3. "Professor Owl"
4. "Sallymander"
5. "Goat"
6. "Orangutango"
7. "She's A Cow"
8. "Black Mamba"
9. "Francois the Flying Squirrel"
10. "Chupacabra"
11. "Francis Bacon"
12. "Beulah"
13. "Lady Spider"
14. "Fireflies"
15. "Hole Beneath My Bed"
16. "Red Frog"
