= Shock (The Motels album) =

Studio album by The Motels
- Released: August 1985
- Recorded: 1984–85
- Studio: Oasis Recording Studios (North Hollywood, California); Capitol Studios and Conway Studios (Hollywood, California)
- Genre: New wave
- Length: 43:18
- Label: Capitol
- Producer: Richie Zito

The Motels chronology
Little Robbers (1983)	Shock (1985)	Clean Modern and Reasonable (2007)

Singles from Shock
- 1. "Shame" Released: July 1985; 2. "Shock" Released: October 1985; 3. "Icy Red" Released: December 1985

Professional ratings
Review scores
Source	Rating
AllMusic	2/5 stars

Shock is the fifth studio album by new wave band the Motels. It was recorded during 1984 and 1985, and released in August 1985. It sold approximately 400,000 copies in the United States.

Singles released from this album include the American Top 30 hit, "Shame," and its follow-up, "Shock", as well as an Australia-only release, "Icy Red", that did not chart. "Shame" reached No. 21 on Billboard's Hot 100. Both songs were aided by popular music videos.

Martha Davis was inspired to write "Shame" by affairs depicted on various soap operas.

== Track listing ==
Side one
No.	Title	Writer(s)	Length
1.	"Shock"	Martha Davis, Scott Thurston	4:30
2.	"Shame"	Davis	4:12
3.	"Hungry"	Davis	4:21
4.	"Annie Told Me"	Davis, Brian Glascock	4:22
5.	"Icy Red"	Davis	4:32
Total length:			21:57

Side two
No.	Title	Writer(s)	Length
1.	"New York Times"	Davis	3:58
2.	"State of the Heart"	Davis, Guy Perry, Richie Zito	4:44
3.	"My Love Stops Here"	Davis, Marty Jourard, Michael Goodroe	3:47
4.	"Cries and Whispers"	Davis, Zito, Davitt Sigerson	4:11
5.	"Night by Night"	Davis	4:41
Total length:			21:21

== Singles ==
Year	Month and date	Catalogue number	Single	Chart	Position
1984	September 27	Capitol Records #9241	"In the Jungle" (Note: This track was not included on the Shock album but was later released as the B side to the single "Shock")	—	—
1985	July 3	Capitol Records #5497	"Shame"	Australia (Kent Music Report)	18
1985	July 3	Capitol Records #5497	"Shame"	United States (Billboard Hot 100)	21
1985	July 3	Capitol Records #5497	"Shame"	United States (Billboard Mainstream Rock)	10
1985	July 3	Capitol Records #5497	"Shame"	United States (Billboard Dance Club Songs)	14
1985	October	Capitol Records #5529	"Shock"	United States (Billboard Hot 100)	84
1985		Capitol Records AU#CP-1698	"Icy Red" (Note: This single was released in Australia only)	—	—

== Personnel ==
Credits are taken from the cassette's liner notes.

The Motels

- Martha Davis – vocals, guitars
- Marty Jourard – keyboards, saxophone
- Scott Thurston – keyboards, guitars
- Guy Perry (aka Adrian Peritore) – lead guitars
- Michael Goodroe – bass
- Brian Glascock – drums, percussion

Additional personnel

- Arthur Barrow – additional synthesizer programming, fretless bass on "Icy Red"
- Gary Chang – additional synthesizer programming

== Production ==
Credits are taken from the cassette's liner notes.

- Richie Zito – producer
- Michael Frondelli – engineer, mix engineer
- Mick Guzauski – engineer
- David Leonard – engineer
- Dave Connors – additional recording
- Peter Doell – assistant engineer
- Samii Taylor – assistant engineer
- Roy Kohara – art direction
- John O'Brien – design
- Tony Viramontes – photography, illustration
- Danny Fritz – management

== Charts ==
Chart (1985)	Peak position
Australia (Kent Music Report)	18
US Billboard 200	36
US Cash Box Top 100 Albums	54
