= The Last Few Beautiful Days =

Studio album by The Motels and Martha Davis
- Released: March 30, 2018
- Studio: 6th Street Penthouse Studios; Ultrasound Studios (Baltimore, Maryland)
- Genre: Pop rock
- Length: 42:41
- Label: Sunset Blvd/Remarkable Records
- Producer: Martha Davis Nicholas Allen Johns

The Motels and Martha Davis chronology
| If Not Now Then When (2017) | The Last Few Beautiful Days (2018) |

The Last Few Beautiful Days is the ninth studio album by new wave band The Motels. Martha Davis's eldest daughter Maria inspired many of the songs on The Last Few Beautiful Days album, as she had died in 2016 after battling an opioid addiction.

== Track listing ==
| No. | Title | Writer(s) | Length |
|---|---|---|---|
| 1. | "Punchline" | Martha Davis | 3:57 |
| 2. | "As Long As" | Davis, Eric Gardner, Nick Johns, Marty Jourard, Clint Walsh | 2:43 |
| 3. | "Lucky Stars" | Davis, Eric Gardner, Nick Johns, Marty Jourard, Clint Walsh | 3:50 |
| 4. | "Look At Me" | Davis, Johns | 3:13 |
| 5. | "Machine" | Davis, Johns | 3:48 |
| 6. | "Light Me Up" | Davis | 4:18 |
| 7. | "Tipping Point" | Davis, Gardner, Johns, Jourard, Walsh, Brady Wells | 4:31 |
| 8. | "Imposters" | Davis, Gardner, Johns, Jourard, Walsh, | 3:12 |
| 9. | "Criminal" | Davis | 4:40 |
| 10. | "Nobody" | Davis | 4:01 |
| 11. | "Last Few Beautiful Days" | Davis | 3:12 |

== Personnel ==
The Motels

- Martha Davis – vocals, guitars
- Nick Johns – acoustic piano, synthesizers, programming, guitars, bass, backing vocals
- Marty Jourard – acoustic piano, clarinets, saxophones
- Clint Walsh – synthesizers, guitars
- Eric Gardner – drums, percussion, programming

Additional musicians

- Vanessa Freebairn-Smith – cello
- Heather Ogilvy – viola, violin
- Michelle Decourcy – backing vocals
- Jesika Miller – backing vocals
- Evan Slamka – backing vocals

== Production ==
- Martha Davis – producer, artwork, logo design concept
- Nick Johns – producer, engineer, recording
- Clint Walsh – recording
- Gavin MacKillop – mixing at Full Kilt Studios (Los Angeles, California)
- Mark Chalecki – mastering at Little Red Book Mastering (Los Angeles, California)
- Martin Kyle-Milward – logo design concept
- Theresa Miller – logo design concept
- Billy Reed – logo design concept
- Penn Weldon – logo design concept, moon photography
- Rebecca Baltutis – layout
- Silvia Grav – band photography
- Matt Lambros – front and back cover photography
