= Beautiful Life (Martha Davis album) =

Studio album by Martha Davis
- Released: April 2008
- Genre: New wave
- Length: 39:08
- Label: self published
- Producer: Martha Davis

Martha Davis chronology
...So the Story Goes (2004)	Beautiful Life (2008)	Red Frog Presents: 16 Songs for Parents and Children (2010)

Beautiful Life, also known as Beautiful Life: A Slight Miscalculation, is the third solo studio album by Martha Davis, who is better known as the lead singer for the band The Motels. The 2008 album is a concept album Martha developed with some help from Matthew Morgan about her mother's life and death by suicide.

== Track listing ==
1. "Watching the World Go By" – 4:05
2. "Beautiful Life" – 2:57
3. "Interlude #1" – 1:21
4. "Let Me Fall" – 3:59
5. "Life Alone" – 4:03
6. "Deep End" – 2:59
7. "The Rain" – 4:40
8. "I Will Breathe" – 3:43
9. "Interlude #2" – 2:04
10. "When It's Over" – 3:21
11. "4:30 Friday" – 4:37
12. "Outro" – 1:15

== Personnel ==
=== The Motels ===
- Martha Davis – vocals, guitar
- Clint Walsh – guitars, vocals, synthesizer
- Jon Siebels – bass guitar
- Nick Johns – keyboard
- Eric Gardner – drums, percussion

=== Production ===
- Produced by Martha Davis
- Mixed by Jon Siebels
- Mastered by Mark Chalecki
