= Motels (album) =

Studio album by The Motels
- Released: September 15, 1979
- Recorded: May–June 1979
- Genre: New wave
- Length: 38:13
- Label: Capitol
- Producer: Carter

The Motels chronology
Motels (1979)	Careful (1980)

Professional ratings
Review scores
Source	Rating
Allmusic	3/5 stars

Motels is the first studio album by American new wave band the Motels, recorded in the spring of 1979 and released in the fall. It was produced by Carter. It peaked at number 175 on Billboard's album chart in December. The album was certified Gold in Australia in 1980, where it had reached number 23 on the Kent Music Report.

On May 12, 1979 (Mother's Day), the Motels signed with Capitol Records. The band began recording on May 14 and finished in the first week of September. The band consisted of Martha Davis (lead vocals, guitar), Jeff Jourard (lead guitar), Marty Jourard (keyboard, saxophone), Michael Goodroe (bass) and Brian Glascock (drums).

The first single, "Closets and Bullets", did not chart anywhere, but the second, "Total Control", became a top 10 hit in Australia, went top 20 in France, and reached number 109 in the US (on Billboard's Bubbling Under the Hot 100 chart). A third single, "Anticipating", was released in Japan in early 1980 but failed to chart.

Anna Oxa recorded "Total Control" in Italian as "Controllo totale" with lyrics by Marco Luberti, and it was released as a single in Italy in 1980. Tina Turner contributed "Total Control" to the 1985 We Are the World album, an American superstar charity recording for famine relief efforts in Ethiopia.

== Track listing ==
All tracks are written by Martha Davis, additional writers where noted.

Side 1
No.	Title	Writer(s)	Length
1.	"Anticipating"		3:51
2.	"Kix"		2:15
3.	"Total Control"	Jeff Jourard	5:54
4.	"Love Don't Help"		1:58
5.	"Closets and Bullets"		4:25
Total length:			18:23

Side 2
No.	Title	Writer(s)	Length
1.	"Atomic Cafe"		2:48
2.	"Celia"		3:07
3.	"Porn Reggae"		4:18
4.	"Dressing Up"	Jourard	5:04
5.	"Counting"		4:33
Total length:			19:50

== Charts ==
=== Weekly charts ===
Chart (1979–80)	Peak position
Australian Albums (Kent Music Report)	23
New Zealand Albums (RMNZ)	4

=== Year-end charts ===
Chart (1980)	Position
New Zealand Albums (RMNZ)	16

== Certifications and sales ==
Region	Certification	Certified units/sales
Australia (ARIA)	Gold	20,000^{^}
^{^} Shipments figures based on certification alone.

== Personnel ==
Credits are taken from the CD's liner notes.

=== The Motels ===
- Martha Davis – vocals, rhythm guitar
- Jeff Jourard – lead guitar
- Marty Jourard – keyboards, saxophone
- Michael Goodroe – bass
- Brian Glascock – drums

== Production ==
Credits are taken from the CD's liner notes.

- Produced and engineered by John Carter
