= Shanghai Opera Theater =

Building in Shanghai, China

Shanghai Theater, or Shanghai Opera Theater (上海大戏院), is a theater located on the corner of Shaanxi Rd S. and Fuxing Rd M., Shanghai. The theater was established in 1942, renamed as Shanghai Cinema in 1956, and closed in 2011 for renovations.

The main hall of the theater can seat about 300 people.

== History ==
- Established in 1942 under the original name of Yinguang (Silver Light) Theater
- Renamed as Shanghai Theater. When it opened to the public in 1943, the drama “The Wilderness (原野)” by Cao Yu helped to spread its influence.
- Renamed as Shanghai Cinema in 1956.
- Closed in 2011 for renovations.

== See also ==
Shanghai Grand Theater
