= Burning Sensations =

American rock band

- Origin: Los Angeles, California, United States
- Genres: New wave
- Years active: 1982–1987
- Labels: Capitol/EMI
- Past members: Tim McGovern; Rob Rio Hasik; Barry "The Hatchet" Wisdom; Morley Bartnoff; Jeff Hollie; Michael Temple

Burning Sensations was a short-lived Los Angeles area rock band. The group is best known for its MTV hit "Belly of the Whale", the music for which blends a rather unusual fusion of rock and calypso styles, and for covering the Jonathan Richman song "Pablo Picasso", which was included in both the 1984 film and soundtrack of director Alex Cox's Repo Man.

== History ==
Burning Sensations formed in 1982 and disbanded in 1987. The founder and leader of Burning Sensations, Tim McGovern, was previously a member of The Motels.

== Members ==
Burning Sensations included:

- Tim McGovern - lead vocals, guitar, synthesizers
- Rob Rio Hasick - bass, guitar, synthesizer
- Barry "The Hatchet" Wisdom - Drums
- Morley Bartnoff - keyboards, backing vocals
- Jeff Hollie - saxophones, backing vocals
- Michael Temple - hand-drums-timbales, percussion

== Discography ==
- Belly of the Whale EP (1982)
- Burning Sensations LP (1983) – Capitol/EMI Records, produced by Tim McGovern and Dave Jerden
  - "Not Cloudy All Day"
  - "Beat Temptation"
  - "Belly of the Whale"
  - "Maria (You Just Don't Know What You're Dealing With)"
  - "Sea Shanty"
  - "Is This What You Mean?"
  - "Down on the Corner" (Writer: John Fogerty)
  - "I Don't Live Today" (Writer: Jimi Hendrix)
  - "Afrobilly (Live It Up)"
  - "Envy"
- Burning Sensations Mini LP (1983) – produced by Tim McGovern and Dave Jerden
  - "Belly Of The Whale"
  - "Check Your Mail"
  - "Carnival Of Souls"
  - "Jokenge"
- Repo Man Soundtrack (1984)
