= Three Hearts =

Studio album by Bob Welch
- Released: February 1979
- Recorded: 1978
- Studios: Sunset Sound Recorders, Hollywood, California
- Genres: Rock, pop, disco
- Length: 40:47, 51:29 (CD reissue)
- Label: Capitol
- Producers: John Carter, Richard Dashut

Bob Welch chronology
French Kiss (1977)	Three Hearts (1979)	The Other One (1979)

Singles from Three Hearts
- 1. "Precious Love" Released: January 1979; 2. "Church" Released: May 1979; 3. "3 Hearts" Released: July 1979

Professional ratings
Review scores
Source	Rating
Allmusic	3/5 stars

Three Hearts is the second solo album by rock musician and former Fleetwood Mac guitarist Bob Welch.

Just like Welch's previous effort French Kiss, Three Hearts was a commercial success. The album reached number 20 on the US charts in 1979 and went gold. It spawned a hit single, "Precious Love", which peaked at number 19, making it Welch's last top 20 hit. "Church" was also a small hit, and peaked at number 73. "Don't Wait Too Long" is a reworking of "Good Things (Come to Those who Wait)", a Welch composition that had been left off the Fleetwood Mac album Mystery to Me.

The album was reissued by Culture Factory in 2013 in a miniature replica LP sleeve, with 3 bonus cuts including the French version of "Precious Love". However, to this day, the 12-inch extended mix of "Precious Love" has never been released on CD.

== Track listing ==
All songs by Bob Welch except where noted

1. "3 Hearts" – 3:23
2. "Oh Jenny" – 4:17
3. "I Saw Her Standing There" (Lennon/McCartney) – 2:53
4. "Here Comes the Night" – 3:03
5. "China" – 3:21
6. "The Ghost of Flight 401" – 3:16
7. "Precious Love" – 3:12
8. "Church" – 3:06
9. "Come Softly to Me" (Gary Troxel, Gretchen Christopher, Barbara Ellis) – 2:42
10. "Devil Wind" – 4:03
11. "Don't Wait Too Long" – 3:50
12. "Little Star" – 3:41

Bonus tracks on 2012 CD re-issue

1. "3 Hearts" [Alternate Version] – 3:20
2. "Une Fille Comme Toi" [French Version of Precious Love] – 3:13
3. "Something Strong" [B-side of Precious Love] – 3:55

== Personnel ==
=== Musicians ===
- Bob Welch – vocals, guitar, bass guitar, keyboards
- Todd Sharp – guitar
- David Adelstein – keyboards, synthesizer
- Alvin Taylor – drums
- Mick Fleetwood – drums, percussion (track 6)
- Christine McVie – keyboards, vocals (tracks 9 & 11)
- Stevie Nicks – vocals (track 10)
- Steve Foreman – percussion
- Gene Page – string arrangements

=== Technical ===
- John Carter – producer
- Richard Dashut – producer (track 6)
- Warren Dewey – engineer
- Ken Perry – mastering
- Neal Preston, Olivier Ferrand, Sam Emerson – photography

== Charts ==
=== Weekly charts ===
Chart (1979)	Peak position
Australia (Kent Music Report)	49

=== Year-end charts ===
Chart (1979)	Position
Canada (RPM)	97
