= Danger (The Motels song) =

1980 song by the Motels

Single by The Motels

from the album Careful
- Released: 1980
- Length: 3:23
- Label: Capitol
- Songwriters: Martha Davis; Tim McGovern
- Producer: Carter

The Motels singles chronology
"Days Are OK" (1980)	"Danger" (1980)	"Whose Problem?" (1980)

"Danger" is a song by American new wave band the Motels, which was released in 1980 as the second single from their second studio album Careful. The song was written by Martha Davis and Tim McGovern, and produced by Carter. "Danger" saw limited commercial success in the US (where it was the album's first single), but generated more chart action in Australasia, peaking at number 88 in Australia and 30 in New Zealand.

== Background ==
Davis originally wrote "Danger" for The Pointer Sisters. She told JAM Magazine in 1980, "My lawyer called me up and said they needed tunes, and I just came up with this little melody and went and sang it in somebody's living room. They loved it, but they already had gotten all of their material so they couldn't use it. I wasn't even going to use it for the Motels." The song went on to be recorded by The Motels after the band's guitarist Tim McGovern worked on the track. Davis recalled in 2000, "Tim got a hold of [the track], making it a little less R&B and a lot more Motel-a-Phonic."

== Critical reception ==
On its release, Cash Box described "Danger" as a "superb track" from a "top notch and highly underrated band". They noted the "muscular groove", "some choppy, hard-edged guitar work" and Davis' "sexy tones". Record World praised Davis' "alluring vocals" and added that the song features "a pulsating guitar [which] underscores her nocturnal fears".

== Track listing ==
7–inch single (US, Canada, Germany, Netherlands, Spain, South Africa and New Zealand)

1. "Danger" – 3:23
2. "Cry Baby" – 3:24

7–inch promotional single (US)

1. "Danger" – 3:23
2. "Danger" – 3:23

7–inch single (UK)

1. "Danger" – 3:23
2. "Total Control" (Edited Version) – 3:45

7–inch single (France)

1. "Danger" – 3:23
2. "Careful" – 3:26

7–inch single (Australia)

1. "Danger" – 3:23
2. "Slow Town" – 4:14

7–inch single (Japan)

1. "Danger" – 3:23
2. "Days Are O.K. (But the Nights Were Made for Love)" – 3:32

12–inch single (UK)

1. "Danger" – 3:23
2. "Envy" – 3:27
3. "Total Control" (Full Length Version) – 5:51

== Personnel ==
Credits are adapted from the Careful LP inner sleeve notes.

The Motels

- Martha Davis – vocals, guitar
- Tim McGovern – guitar
- Marty Jourard – keyboards, saxophone
- Michael Goodroe – bass
- Brian Glascock – drums

Production

- Carter – producer, engineer
- Warren Dewey – recording
- Richard McKernan – assistant engineer

== Charts ==
Chart (1980)	Peak position
Australia (Kent Music Report)	88
New Zealand (Recorded Music NZ)	30
US Record World Singles 101–150	127
