= ...So the Story Goes =

Studio album by Martha Davis
- Released: October 2004
- Genre: New wave
- Length: 49:59
- Label: Clean Sheets
- Producer: Martha Davis

Martha Davis chronology
Policy (1987)	...So the Story Goes (2004)	Beautiful Life (2008)

...So the Story Goes is the second solo studio album by Martha Davis, who is better known as the lead singer for the band The Motels.

== Track listing ==
All tracks are written by Martha Davis

No.	Title	Length
1.	"Into Your Arms"	4:10
2.	"True Love"	4:15
3.	"Angel"	4:07
4.	"By the Fire"	4:59
5.	"So the Story Goes"	4:13
6.	"Sweet Love"	3:45
7.	"Crazy"	4:27
8.	"Where Are You Now"	4:07
9.	"How It Has to Be"	3:42
10.	"Torture Me"	4:38
11.	"You Been Cut"	3:33
12.	"Green Valley"	4:03
Total length:		49:59

== Personnel ==
Musicians

- Martha Davis – vocals, guitar, keyboards
- Clint Walsh – lead guitar, rhythm guitar
- Eric Gardner – drums, percussion (all tracks), glockenspiel (track 2)
- Doug Lunn – bass (tracks 2, 4, 7 - 12), piano (tracks 4, 11)
- Shon Sullivan – piano (tracks 5, 12), acoustic guitar (tracks 1 - 3, 5, 8, 12), keyboards (tracks 4, 9)
- Paul Ill – bass (tracks 1, 5, 6)
- David Sutton – acoustic bass (tracks 3, 4)
- Kevin McCormick - bass (track 3)
- Dana Colley – saxophones (tracks 5, 6), bass clarinet (tracks 3, 5, 12), melodica (track 12)
- Jim Fitting – harmonica (track 2)

Production

- Produced by Martha Davis
- Executive Produced by David Paglia
- Mixed & Engineered by Edmund Monsef
- Mastered by Brian "Big Bass" Gardner
