= Careful (The Motels album) =

Studio album by the Motels
- Released: June 15, 1980
- Recorded: March–May 1980
- Genre: New wave
- Length: 35:01
- Label: Capitol
- Producer: Carter

The Motels chronology
Motels (1979)	Careful (1980)	All Four One (1982)

Professional ratings
Review scores
Source	Rating
AllMusic	4/5 stars
Smash Hits	5/10

Careful is the second studio album by American new wave band the Motels. It was recorded between March and May 1980, and released in June 1980. The album was produced by Carter, who had produced the group's 1979 debut.

"Danger" was released as the album's lead single and landed in the Top 20 in France. "Days Are O.K." and "Whose Problem?" became Top 50 songs (and their only chart hits) in the United Kingdom. None of the singles released from the album charted in the United States, but the record reached number 45 on the Billboard album chart in the summer of 1980. It eventually sold nearly 400,000 copies in the U.S.

With the departure of Jeff Jourard as lead guitarist, Tim McGovern (from the group the Pop) was added as lead guitarist for the group. Recording for the second album began on 4 February 1980 and would be completed by May 1980.

"Danger" was the second Motels single that was accompanied by a music video (following 1979's "Total Control").

== Track listing ==
Side one
No.	Title	Writer(s)	Length
1.	"Danger"	Martha Davis, Tim McGovern	3:26
2.	"Envy"	McGovern	3:26
3.	"Careful"	Marty Jourard, Michael Goodroe	3:30
4.	"Bonjour Baby"	Jourard, Goodroe	3:25
5.	"Party Professionals"	Davis	3:15
Total length:			17:02

Side Two
No.	Title	Writer(s)	Length
1.	"Days Are O.K. (But the Nights Were Made for Love)"	McGovern	3:35
2.	"Cry Baby"	Jourard, Goodroe	3:28
3.	"Whose Problem?"	Davis	3:51
4.	"People, Places and Things"	Davis	2:46
5.	"Slow Town"	Davis	4:19
Total length:			17:59

== Charts ==
=== Weekly charts ===
Chart (1980)	Peak position
Australian Albums (Kent Music Report)	26
New Zealand Albums (RMNZ)	3

=== Year-end charts ===
Chart (1980)	Position
New Zealand Albums (RMNZ)	47

== Personnel ==
Credits are taken from the CD's liner notes.

=== The Motels ===
- Martha Davis – vocals, rhythm guitar
- Tim McGovern – lead guitar
- Marty Jourard – keyboards, saxophone
- Michael Goodroe – bass
- Brian Glascock – drums

== Production ==
Credits are taken from the CD's liner notes.

- Produced & Engineered by John Carter
- Recorded by Warren Dewey
- Assistant Engineering by Richard McKernan
- Cover Painting by Duggie Fields - "Acquired Mannerisms"
