= Suddenly Last Summer (song) =

1983 single by the Motels

- Artwork of the US 7-inch single sleeve

Single by the Motels

from the album Little Robbers
- B-side: "Some Things Never Change"
- Released: August 1983
- Recorded: 1983
- Genre: New wave
- Length: 3:42
- Label: Capitol
- Songwriter: Martha Davis
- Producer: Val Garay

The Motels singles chronology
"Forever Mine" (1982)	"Suddenly Last Summer" (1983)	"Remember the Nights" (1983)

Music video
- "Suddenly Last Summer" on YouTube

"Suddenly Last Summer" is a song by American new wave band the Motels, released as the lead single from their fourth album, Little Robbers (1983). The single peaked at number nine on the US Billboard Hot 100 and topped the Billboard Rock Top Tracks chart. In Canada, it climbed to number 11 and ended 1983 as the country's 98th-best-selling single. The B-side of the 7-inch single is "Some Things Never Change," and the song was included on the 1990 compilation album, No Vacancy – The Best of The Motels.

== Inspiration ==
Martha Davis has said in various interviews that the song touches upon themes such as the loss of virginity and innocence. She has also mentioned how the inspiration came from knowing that "...summer is ending when you hear the ice cream truck go by for the last time and you know he won't be back for a while". In an interview with Davis in 2019, Linda Tuccio-Koonz further expanded on the song's themes of cyclical loss and new beginnings:

"'Suddenly Last Summer' percolated for years. The song, written after her parents had died — her mom by suicide and her dad from illness — is a reflection on those moments in life when things are changing, like when it’s a beautiful sunny day and a cold wind blows and you know the end of summer is coming."

Despite sharing the same name, there are no ties to Tennessee Williams' 1958 one-act play of the same name. The writer had died in February 1983—the same month that the Motels returned to the studio to record Little Robbers. According to Davis, the writer's death and the song's release were purely coincidental. She hadn't read Williams' work or seen the 1959 film version of Suddenly, Last Summer until long after the song was released. Also, "Suddenly Last Summer" was chosen because Davis liked the alliterative sound of the title.

== Music video ==
A music video was directed by the single's producer Val Garay with cinematography by John Alonzo. Filmed with soft focus, it depicts Martha Davis recalling a romantic encounter at the beach (with the love interest portrayed by Robert Carradine) after an ice cream truck passes through her neighborhood; everyone else has a judging, stern expression both in the past and when she awakens back in the present. The book Davis is seen reading in the video is Jane Bierce's 1983 novel Building Passion. The band members also appear and loosely reenact the stances of the "robbers" on the Little Robbers album cover at the video's conclusion. The video's sleep motif may have been inspired by Davis' songwriting process, as she awoke at 3 A.M. with the inspiration to write "Suddenly Last Summer".

== Charts ==
=== Weekly charts ===
Chart (1983)	Peak position
Australia (Kent Music Report)	34
Belgium (Ultratop 50 Flanders)	16
Canada Top Singles (RPM)	11
Netherlands (Dutch Top 40)	11
Netherlands (Single Top 100)	20
New Zealand (Recorded Music NZ)	28
US Billboard Hot 100	9
US Adult Contemporary (Billboard)	18
US Rock Top Tracks (Billboard)	1

=== Year-end charts ===
Chart (1983)	Position
Canada Top Singles (RPM)	98

== See also ==
- List of number-one mainstream rock hits (United States)
