= This (The Motels album) =

Studio album by The Motels
- Released: April 16, 2008
- Recorded: 2007
- Genre: New wave
- Length: 38:49
- Label: self published
- Producer: The Motels

The Motels chronology
Clean Modern and Reasonable (2007)	This (2008)	Apocalypso (2011)

This is the seventh studio album by the band The Motels, recorded with current touring band whom Martha Davis has been working with for a few years. When Matthew Morgan, a producer-engineer from Portland met up with The Motels, the resulting work became the new album, This.

== Track listing ==
All tracks are written by Martha Davis, except where noted

No.	Title	Writer(s)	Length
1.	"Last of the Bohemians"	Davis, Jon Siebels	3:06
2.	"Doesn't Really Matter"		3:07
3.	"The Day That Won't Go Away"		3:48
4.	"Nothing"	Davis, Siebels	3:55
5.	"Let It Go"	Davis, Nick Johns	4:12
6.	"Where Oh Where"	Davis, Siebels	3:18
7.	"Now I'm Here"	Davis, Siebels	2:56
8.	"Everything Is Perfect"		2:29
9.	"I'm Better Now"		3:50
10.	"All the Rage"	Davis, Siebels	4:06
11.	"Sleep"		4:02
Total length:			38:49

== Personnel ==
The Motels

- Martha Davis – vocals, guitar
- Clint Walsh – guitars, vocals, synthesizer
- Jon Siebels – bass guitar
- Nick Johns – keyboard
- Eric Gardner – drums, percussion
- Rusty Logsdon – upright bass on "Sleep"
- Dave Siebels – Hammond B3 organ on "Day the Earth Died"

Production

- Recorded by Matt Morgan & Jon Siebels
- Mixed by Jon Siebels at Clifton Studios
- Mastered by Mark Chalecki
