= Teatro ZinZanni =

Circus dinner theater

Coordinates: 37.80495°N 122.40253°W

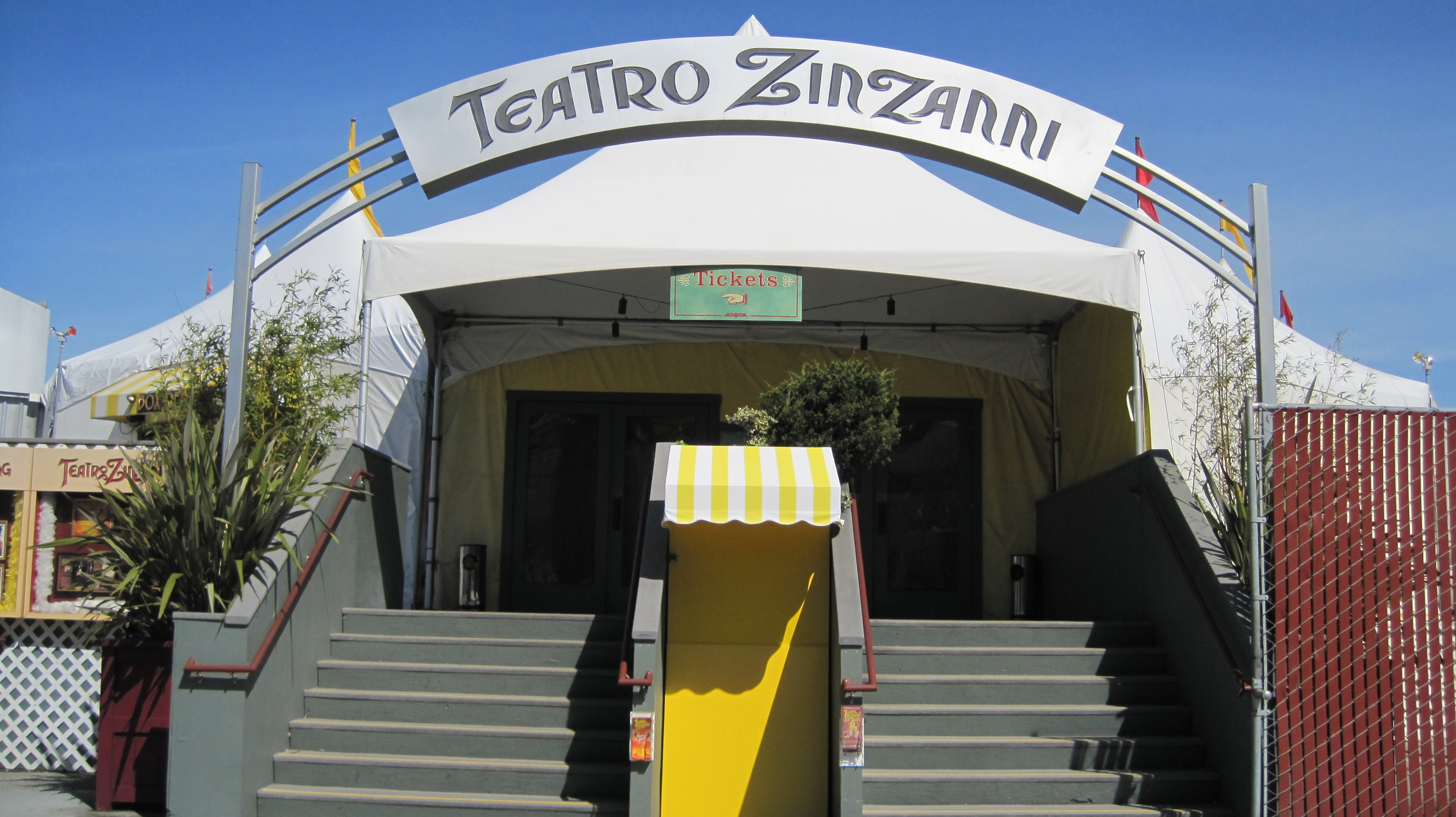
- Teatro ZinZanni in San Francisco
- Formation: October 29, 1998
- Type: Theatre group
- Purpose: Circus, dinner theater
- Location(s): Seattle; San Francisco; Chicago
- Notable members: Norman Langill
- Website: zinzanni.org

Teatro ZinZanni in its original location in Seattle's Denny Regrade.

Teatro ZinZanni is a circus dinner theater that began in the neighborhood of Lower Queen Anne in Seattle, Washington. It has since expanded its operations to San Francisco and Chicago.

== History ==
Teatro ZinZanni was created by Norman Langill, and was once described as "the Moulin Rouge meets Cirque du Soleil." The show is a blend of European circus and cabaret and American vaudeville performed in a Belgian spiegeltent (mirror tent). Until mid-2011 the show was produced by the Seattle-based non-profit events company, One Reel. Teatro Zinzanni is now an independent company.

Teatro ZinZanni opened in Seattle on October 29, 1998 for a run initially scheduled to end on Jan. 17, 1999, and ended up playing to sold-out houses until it closed on December 31, 1999. Members of the original cast included tap dancer Wayne Doba, also known for being San Francisco Giants mascot the Crazy Crab, Kevin Kent, and Ann Wilson of the rock group Heart. It then moved its operation to San Francisco, opening there in March 2000 at Pier 29 on The Embarcadero. In 2002, it reopened a permanent operation in Seattle's Belltown district. The operation has since moved to Seattle's theatre district on Mercer Street across from Seattle Center. As of 2017, Teatro ZinZanni has moved to Redmond, Washington, in the Marymoor Park area. This is said to be a temporary location through April 2018, at which time they will move to a permanent location. Teatro ZinZanni's San Francisco location closed its operation on December 31, 2011, due to the city's preparation for the America's Cup, but has plan to reopen at another location on the Embarcadero after fund-raising is complete.

Teatro ZinZanni opened a Chicago location in the downtown theatre district above the James M. Nederlander Theatre in 2019.

The many performers in Teatro ZinZanni productions have included Joan Baez, Andrea Conway, Duffy Bishop, Yamil Borges, Kevin Kent, Martha Davis of the rock group The Motels, Michael Davis, El Vez, Frank Ferrante, Geoff Hoyle, Sally Kellerman, Liliane Montevecchi, Maria Muldaur, Melanie Stace, and Puddles Pity Party.

Although first billed as individual performers Andrea Conway and Wayne Doba later appear in several productions as real life husband and wife tap-dancing vaudeville comedy duo “Dik and Mitzi”.

Teatro ZinZanni has produced two CDs: The Divas, with Baez, Montevecchi, Kellerman, Thelma Houston and others, and Omnium, a collaboration of TZ Maestro Norman Durkee with Martha Davis.

In addition to Teatro ZinZanni's evening dinner shows, Teatro ZinZanni has introduced a variety of special projects including brunches, late-night cabarets (Cabaret Lunatique, Mezzo Lunatico), a concert series (Mirror Tent Music), children's/family programming (Big Top Rock, "Zirkus Fantazmo") and offers year-round education opportunities including day camps.

== Recent developments ==
Following the COVID-19 pandemic, Teatro ZinZanni resumed and expanded productions in both Seattle and Chicago. In Seattle, the company celebrated its 25th anniversary with productions staged at the Lotte Hotel Seattle in 2024. Additional Seattle productions during 2024 and 2025 included SIZZLE!, featuring rotating casts of circus performers, musicians, comedians, and cabaret artists.

In Chicago, Teatro ZinZanni continued performances at the Cambria Hotel in the Loop district through 2024 and 2025, presenting productions including Love, Chaos & Dinner. Productions during this period featured artists including Liv Warfield and Frank Ferrante.

In early 2026, reports emerged that Teatro ZinZanni had suspended productions in both Seattle and Chicago amid financial and operational challenges.

== See also ==
- List of dinner theaters
