= Total Control (song) =

Single by The Motels

from the album Motels
- B-side: "Love Don't Help"
- Released: 1979
- Recorded: 1979
- Length: 3:45
- Label: Capitol
- Songwriters: Martha Davis, Jeff Jourard
- Producer: Carter

The Motels singles chronology
"Closets and Bullets" (1979)	"Total Control" (1979)	"Anticipating" (1980)

"Total Control" is a song by American new wave band the Motels. It was released in 1979 as the second single from their debut studio album Motels. The song failed to make an appearance on the US Billboard Hot 100, but reached number 9 on the Bubbling Under the Hot 100 chart in December 1979. It fared better in Australasia, peaking at number 7 in Australia and 11 in New Zealand.

== Background ==
Speaking of the song in 2000, Davis recalled, "When I wrote this my heart had been broken. I was angry, I wrote a thrash punk rock song, [then] Jeff Jourard came along with this wonderful minimalist chord progression [and] I laid my thrash lyrics on the new progression."

== Reception ==
Upon its release as a single, Cash Box noted how Davis' "hauntingly plaintive vocals succeed beautifully in capturing the smoldering intensity of this L.A.-based outfit on the first single off of its self-titled debut effort". The reviewer also commented on the "lazy bass and fluid, moaning sax work [which] catch the bluesy late night feel of the cut". Record World considered the song to be a "rather quirky ballad" on which Davis "gives a hauntingly vulnerable reading".

The song was prominently featured in Jonathan Demme's 1986 comedy-thriller film Something Wild during a pivotal robbery scene involving Ray Sinclair (Ray Liotta) and Charlie Driggs (Jeff Daniels).

== Cover versions ==
"Total Control" has been covered by American singer Tina Turner for the 1985 We Are the World album, an American superstar charity recording for famine relief efforts in Ethiopia, and by Australian singer Missy Higgins for the television series Total Control. In 1980, Italian singer Anna Oxa made a spooky cover of the song with new lyrics in Italian by Marco Luberti under the title "Controllo totale", and it was released as a single there in 1980.

== Track listing ==
US 7" single

1. "Total Control" - 3:45
2. "Love Don't Help" - 1:56

== Charts ==
=== Weekly charts ===
Weekly chart performance for "Total Control"
Chart (1979–80)	Peak position
Australia (Kent Music Report)	7
New Zealand (Recorded Music NZ)	11
UK Singles Chart (BMRB)	106
UK The Singles Chart (Record Business)	110
US Billboard Bubbling Under the Hot 100	9

=== Year-end charts ===
Year-end chart performance for "Total Control"
Chart (1980)	Position
Australia (Kent Music Report)	32
