= Scott Thurston =

American musician (born 1952)

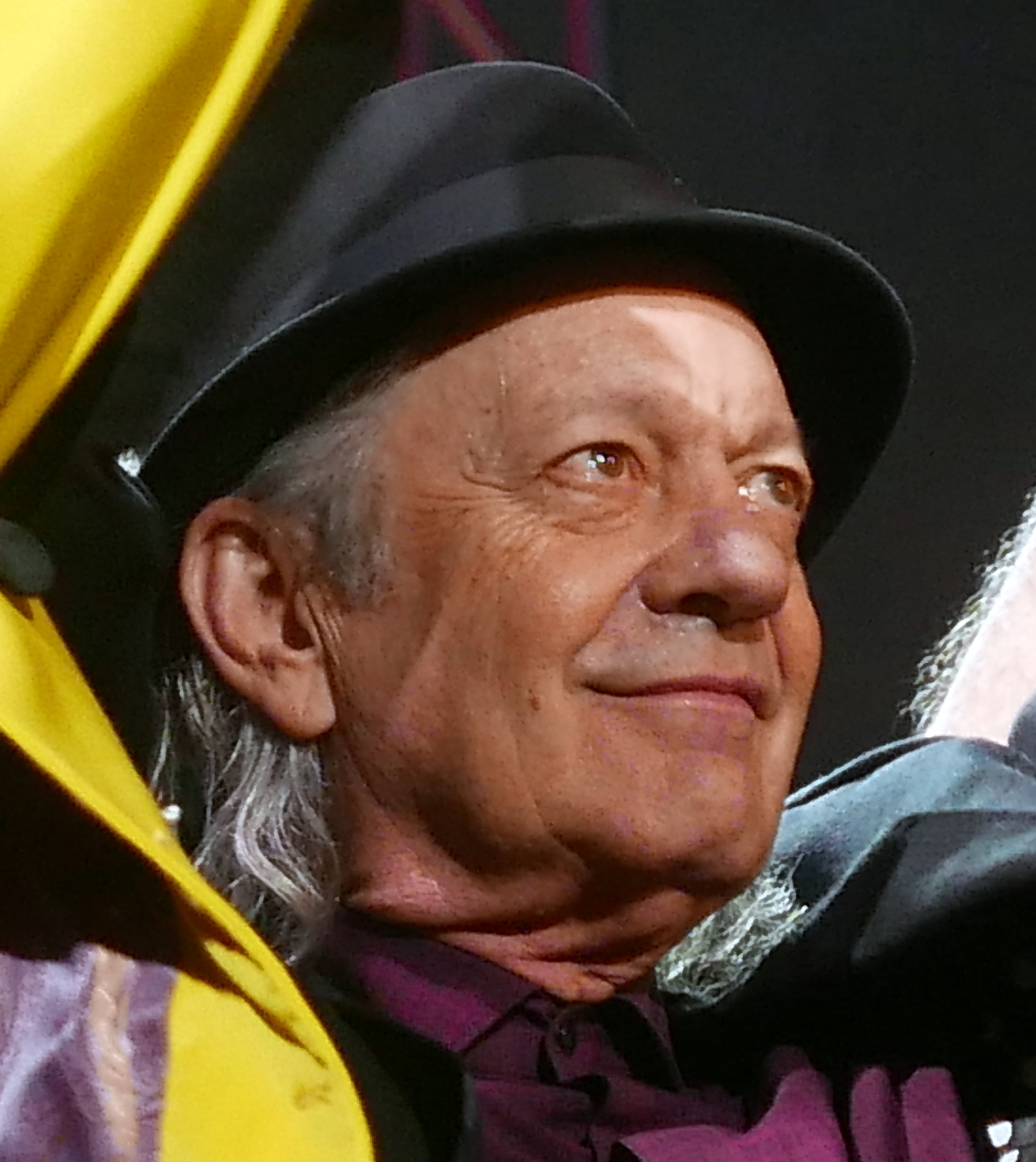
- Thurston performing in 2017

Background information
- Born: Scott Troy Thurston; January 10, 1952 (age 74)
- Origin: Midwest, United States
- Genres: Rock; proto-punk
- Instruments: Guitar; keyboards; harmonica; vocals
- Years active: 1973–present

Scott Troy Thurston (born January 10, 1952) is an American guitarist, keyboardist, songwriter, and session musician. He was a member of the Stooges, and of Tom Petty and the Heartbreakers, in which he sang harmony vocals and played guitar, keyboards, and harmonica.

== Musical career ==
Raised in Medford, Oregon, Thurston started out as a session musician. He has played with Jackson Browne (1986 to 1998), Tom Petty and the Heartbreakers, The Cult (1991), Melissa Etheridge, Glenn Frey, Hokus Pokus, Iggy and the Stooges (as part of the band from 1973 to 1974, and recordings with Iggy Pop in 1975, 1977 and 1979), Jump (1971; organ & lead vocals), Nils Lofgren, The Motels, Ron Asheton's The New Order, Bonnie Raitt, and John Trudell.

Thurston later became a professional songwriter, penning tunes for (and sometimes with) Jackson Browne, Iggy Pop, and The Motels.

James Williamson of the Stooges has said, "I was over at Capitol Records and as I was going out I was watching this guy recording and it was Scott Thurston with this other band. He was cool, I could hear that he was a great piano player, so I got his contact info and I said, 'You wanna play with us?' When we put the band back together, I asked him if he wanted to play with us, and he said, 'Sure,' and the rest is history."

Williamson went on to say that he did not play much on Iggy Pop's New Values album: "Actually, I only played guitar on a couple of things. Scott played almost all the guitar. He's a very talented guy. He's a very good guitar player and a very good keyboard guy. He's just a very good musician."

In 1982 Thurston joined The Motels and played on their 1983 album Little Robbers. Prior to that he was also a member of the Chas Sandford Group.

Thurston joined Tom Petty and the Heartbreakers for their Full Moon Fever tour in 1989, which turned into a permanent spot in the band's lineup. Thurston played rhythm guitar, keyboards, harmonica, and sang backing vocals.

Tom Petty said, "I was trying to get him out of the corner over there, because he always saw himself as a sideman—"I'm a Sidebreaker"—and he tried to stay over to the side. But we love him, he sings great with me, and we want him out there with us. He's a good buffer between the rest of us. When we're fighting or have some cliqueishness, he's good at getting in there and saying, "Let's look at it this way," because Duckhead, as we call him, is neutral. He doesn't come from Florida, wasn't there when this or that happened."
