= John S. Carter =

American musician and music producer (1945-2011)

John Carter
- Birth name: John S. Carter Jr.
- Born: June 14, 1945; East St. Louis, Illinois
- Died: May 10, 2011 (aged 65); Palm Springs, California
- Occupations: Record producer; songwriter; arranger; instrumentalist; A&R man

John S. Carter Jr. (June 14, 1945 – May 10, 2011), better known as simply Carter, was an American music producer, writer, arranger, instrumentalist, and A&R man.

Carter was born the son of an oil wildcatter in East St. Louis, Illinois. His music career began in 1967 when he co-wrote "That Acapulco Gold" (a #70 hit on the Billboard Hot 100 chart) with Tim Gilbert of the Rainy Daze. Also with Gilbert, he co-wrote the lyrics to "Incense and Peppermints," a Billboard #1 hit by the Strawberry Alarm Clock.

He first worked for Atlantic Records and was recruited to the A&R department of Capitol Records. There he worked with Bob Seger (fostering his hit album Night Moves) and the Steve Miller Band during the periods of their commercial breakthroughs. He also signed Sammy Hagar, Bob Welch and The Motels to Capitol, and co-wrote and produced some of their early output.

Carter is credited with relaunching the career of Tina Turner in the 1980s. In 1983, despite opposition from within Capitol, Carter signed Turner and supported her throughout the recording of her first Capitol album, Private Dancer—an album that ultimately involved eight different producers. Though many producers contributed to the album, it was Carter who produced the title song. The album went on to sell more than 20 million copies and made Turner a global superstar.

He died of cancer on May 10, 2011, in Palm Springs, California.

Carter had a daughter in 1980 with his wife Jeannie named Crosby Carter. She followed in his footsteps and became an artist manager.

== Production discography ==
- Horses - Horses (1969)
- Sammy Hagar - Nine on a Ten Scale (1976)
- Sammy Hagar - Sammy Hagar (1977)
- Bob Welch - French Kiss (1977)
- Sammy Hagar - Musical Chairs (1977)
- Sammy Hagar - All Night Long/Loud and Clear (1978)
- Bob Welch - Three Hearts (1979)
- The Motels - Motels (1979)
- Bob Welch - The Other One (1979)
- The Motels - Careful (1980)
- Bob Welch - Man Overboard (1980)
- Prism - All the Best From Prism (1980)
- Deserters - Deserters (1981)
- Prism - Small Change (1981)
- Toni K. - La Bomba (1982)
- Deserters - Siberian Nightlife (1983)
- Prism - Beat Street (1983)
- Sammy Hagar - Live 1980 (1983)
- Tina Turner - Private Dancer (1984)
