= Martha Davis (musician) =

American rock and new wave singer-songwriter

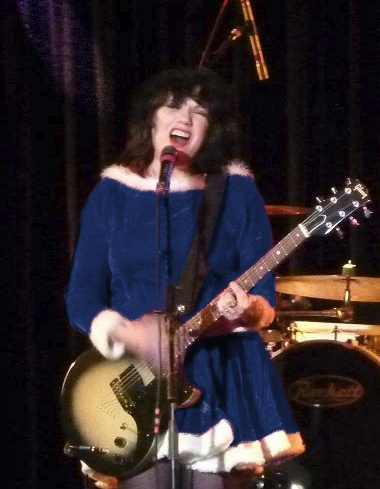
- Martha Davis in 2011

Background information
- Born: January 19, 1951 (age 75); Berkeley, California
- Genres: Rock; pop; new wave
- Occupations: Musician; singer; songwriter
- Instruments: Vocals; guitar
- Years active: 1971–present
- Labels: Capitol; Remarkable Records; Clean Sheets
- Member of: The Motels
- Website: themotels.com

Martha Emily Davis (born January 19, 1951) is an American rock and new wave singer-songwriter from Berkeley, California. She is most famous for being the lead singer of the band the Motels, but has also made several solo albums, contributed many songs to motion pictures, been on television, and worked onstage with Teatro ZinZanni.

== Early life ==
Martha Emily Davis was born on January 19, 1951, in Berkeley, California. She was the second child. Her parents had adopted older sister Janet. Davis' father was an administrator at the University of California, Berkeley, and her mother had worked as a kindergarten teacher in Berkeley. Growing up in a household that was both conservative and Bohemian, Davis began taking guitar and ballet lessons at the age of 8. Davis recounted that her love of music not only came from her parents, but also from a babysitter (a law student at the time) who eventually became a renowned judge: Thelton Henderson.

At the age of 15, upon discovering that she was pregnant, Davis dropped out during her freshman year of high school. She entered into a hasty marriage with the child's father, Ronnie Paschell, a 17-year-old whom she had been dating since the age of 12. Paschell enlisted in the U.S. Air Force shortly after the nuptials. The young couple then embarked on a new life at an airbase in Tampa, Florida.

Despite having a second child with Paschell, the marriage was tumultuous. Davis would later reveal that the lyrics "I heard him talkin’ / I heard him say / He wasn't gonna kill you / He was just gonna fuck up your pretty face" from the song "Celia" were inspired by something that Paschell had said to her during their marriage. When Paschell was called to serve in Vietnam, Davis wrote him a letter stating that she was going to return to Berkeley, and the couple divorced thereafter in 1970. (Paschell later died in Quang Tri in April of 1972).Upon returning to Berkeley in 1968, a now 17-year-old Davis found that her hometown had changed as the counterculture was in full swing. While Davis participated in a few sit-ins, she felt disenchanted that many of the attendees were not participating for the cause but rather for the adrenaline rush. It was also during this time that Davis made efforts to earn her high school diploma. Often she had to bring her daughters along while she attended classes.

When Davis was 19, her mother (who had been divorced from Davis' father) died by suicide. Following her mother's death, Davis' father encouraged his daughter to attend vocational school. However, upon discovering her late mother's diary, Davis learned that her mother—a UC Berkeley English major who once belonged to Phi Beta Kappa—had aspired to be an author but had given up on her dreams to fulfill her domestic role. Davis theorized that "My mother became the wife she thought my father wanted her to be...It was a brutal and lonely lesson when she died, but I learned from her not to give myself up." Davis purchased a home using an inheritance left by her mother and survived as a single mother on welfare. It was at this time that Davis turned toward a musical career.

== Career ==
=== 1970–1980 ===
In 1971, while still residing in Berkeley, Davis joined The Warfield Foxes. Although Davis has been credited as being a founder, she was actually invited to sing for the band by her friend Lisa Brenneis. As a single mother, Davis would often bring her daughters with her to rehearsals. In 1973, Davis' father died due to an illness, and she relied on older sister Janet for familial support.

By 1975, Davis had to leave behind her family and home in Berkeley so that The Warfield Foxes could try to launch their musical career in Los Angeles. The group's name slowly morphed into the Motels after being inspired by the motor inns that they passed along Santa Monica Boulevard. However, the band encountered mixed success as it was a prerequisite that a band had to belong to a label in order for them to perform at music venues. The band resided in Echo Park, and Davis began her first significant romance since her marriage with bandmate Dean Chamberlain (guitarist). Their relationship dissipated by 1977 when Chamberlain left the Motels, and Davis used the breakup as the inspiration for her song "Total Control".

After changing band members in 1978, the lineup now included Davis (lead vocals, guitar), Jeff Jourard (guitarist), Marty Jourard (keyboards; saxophone), Michael Goodroe (bass) and Brian Glascock (drums). On May 12, 1979, the Motels finally signed with Capitol Records, and the group's first album Motels (1979; produced by John Carter) was released in the fall of the same year.

=== 1980–1990 ===
The 1980s was pivotal not only for Davis' rising musical success, but also for her health crisis. She battled breast cancer in 1984 and received surgical treatment for it. Davis reformed the group into a 1980s new wave band that created five albums produced by Capitol Records.

The Motels' second album Careful (1980), also produced by Carter, was released on June 15, 1980. By the end of 1981, lead guitarist Tim McGovern (who had replaced Jeff Jourard) departed, as his four-year romantic relationship with Davis culminated in a bitter power struggle on his part. The Motels then hired producer Val Garay as the group's manager, who also did production duties on the band's third album All Four One. All Four One was released on April 6, 1982. The band's albums Little Robbers and Shock (produced by Richie Zito) were released in 1983 and 1985 respectively. Davis became romantically involved with the band's guitarist Kevin McCormack, with whom she co-wrote the Motels song "Isle of You".

Although All Four One and Little Robbers produced hits, the Motels reached a nadir. As Davis said about the success following the song "Only the Lonely":

"Even with that song it was the first time we had a hit, it definitely was not what I was envisioning for myself and then as time goes on, you get a hit so they say, 'Oh, I guess this is working, that’s what we’re supposed to be doing', it became more and more in that direction MOR [middle of the road]."

Around the time, Davis had stated in interviews that she often invested her own money into the band. Yet, although the Motels had a familial-like bond, Davis painstakingly decided to fire all of the band members. The 1987 album Policy (which was intended to be another Motels album) became Davis' first solo album and included the singles "Don't Tell Me the Time", "Tell It to the Moon" and "Don't Ask Out Loud". Policy was not well-received, and Davis later stated that the album's songs (one of which was penned by Diane Warren) were a mismatch for her style.

By 1989, Davis asked to be released from her Capitol Records contract. While Davis partially retired from producing music afterwards, she still had a small part in the movie Bill & Ted's Excellent Adventure.

=== 1990–2000 ===
The early 1990s marked the end of Davis' engagement to a saxophone player with whom she became involved during the creation of her Policy album. On the musical front, Davis was asked to create music for several films that included Madhouse (1990) and Miracle Beach (1992). In addition to working with artists such as Clarence Clemons, Charlie Sexton and Kenny G, Davis also played sporadic performances to showcase her original material. By the decade's end, Davis was once again writing songs regularly and even created a new incarnation of the Motels.

=== 2000–present ===
In 2001, Davis and the Motels' new lineup appeared on the television show Hit Me, Baby, One More Time. She made her first solo album in seventeen years titled So The Story Goes and in 2005 joined Teatro ZinZanni for a two-month run in Seattle. She wrote music and helped create an album for this show. In 2007, Davis and the band appeared on the Australian concert series Countdown Spectacular 2. The following year, Davis released Beautiful Life (2008) and her solo album (which was released near the time Davis was going through another divorce) touched upon her mother's death and legacy. She released two other albums with the Motels, and in 2010, Davis created her first album for children titled Red Frog Presents 16 Songs For Parents and Children. In 2018, Davis released the album The Last Few Beautiful Days.

== Personal life ==
Davis' children include daughters Maria and Patricia. In 1982, Davis adopted son Phil from her sister Janet. Her eldest daughter Maria died in 2016 after battling an opioid addiction. Maria's death inspired many of the songs on The Last Few Beautiful Days album. Davis continues to tour and she lives on a 72-acre ranch (which has doubled as a recording studio for her) near Portland surrounded by her many pets.

== Discography ==
With The Motels:

- Motels (1979)
- Careful (1980)
- All Four One (1982)
- Little Robbers (1983)
- Shock (1985)
- This (2008)
- Apocalypso (2011)
- If Not Now Then When (2017)
- The Last Few Beautiful Days (2018)

Solo:

- Policy (1987)
- ...So the Story Goes (2004)
- Beautiful Life (2008)
- Red Frog Presents: 16 Songs for Parents and Children (2010)
- I Have My Standards (2020)
- DAS7 with Eric Allaman and Reinhard Scheuregger (2021)
