= Val Garay =

American recording engineer and record producer (born 1942)

- Born: May 9, 1942 (age 84); San Francisco, California, US
- Occupations: Recording engineer, record producer
- Website: valgaray.com

Val Garay (born May 9, 1942) is an American recording engineer and record producer who has worked with Linda Ronstadt, James Taylor, Kim Carnes, the Motels, Neil Diamond and others. Garay also co-founded Los Angeles recording studio Record One.

== Career ==
Garay, the son of Latin singer Joaquin Garay and half-brother of Joaquin Garay III grew up in Burlingame, California, where he graduated from Burlingame High School. A songwriter and guitarist, Garay left behind studies at Stanford University School of Medicine to pursue a career as a professional musician.

In the mid-1970s, Garay's manager, Michael J. Gruber, introduced him to engineer and producer David Hassinger, founder of The Sound Factory recording studio in Hollywood. Garay was soon engineering recording sessions at The Sound Factory and working with Peter Asher, on albums like Linda Ronstadt's Heart Like a Wheel, James Taylor's JT, and Bonnie Raitt's The Glow.

In January 1980, Garay opened his own studio, Record One, in the Sherman Oaks neighborhood of Los Angeles, California, producing the Kim Carnes album Mistaken Identity and its Grammy Award-winning song, "Bette Davis Eyes." Garay engineered James Taylor's Dad Loves His Work in 1981, and produced the Motels' hit album All Four One in 1982.

Garay has also worked with Kenny Rogers, Ringo Starr, Mr. Big, Eric Burdon, Dolly Parton, Queensrÿche, Dramarama, EZO, Sarah Brightman, Nicolette Larson, Santana, Reel Big Fish, Joan Armatrading, Katrina, and others.

In 1989, Garay sold Record One to Allen Sides, who added Record One to the Ocean Way Recording Group.

In November 2010, he partnered with attorney George Woolverton to form Red Red Records, and he works with up-and-coming new artists as well as produces/engineers scores for motion picture and television projects.

== Awards and recognition ==
In 1982, Garay shared a Grammy Award for Record of the Year with Kim Carnes, for "Bette Davis Eyes". He has received numerous entertainment industry awards and additional Grammy nominations, including Best Engineered Recording for his work on the James Taylor album JT and Linda Ronstadt's Simple Dreams, a nomination for Album of the Year for Kim Carnes' Mistaken Identity, and a nomination for Producer of the Year. He received an Emmy nomination for Best Engineered Recording of a TV Special for Neil Diamond's I'm Glad You're Here with Me Tonight, as well as dozens of gold and platinum records.

== Personal life ==
Garay is married to Nicole Dunn, CEO of Dunn Pellier Media, a Los Angeles-based public relations firm for celebrity health and wellness talent.
