= The Motels =

American New Wave band

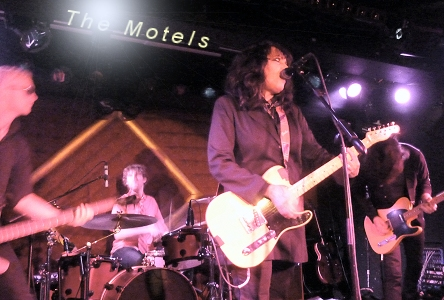
- The Motels performing live in 2011

Background information
- Origin: Berkeley, California, United States
- Genres: New wave; alternative rock
- Years active: 1975–1977, 1978–1987, 1998–present
- Labels: Capitol, EMI
- Members: Martha Davis; Nic Johns; Clint Walsh; Eric Gardner; Marty Jourard
- Past members: Dean Chamberlain; Chuck Wada; Lisa Brenneis; Richard D'Andrea; Robert Newman; Michael Goodroe; Brian Glascock; Jeff Jourard; Tim McGovern; Guy Perry; Scott Thurston; David Platshon; Jason Loree; Erik Lemaire; Adrian Burke; David Van Pattoen; Mic Taras; Angelo Barbera; Kevin Bowen; Michael Barbera; Nick LeMieux; Fritz Lewak; David Sutton; Eric Gardner; Jon Siebels; Felix Mercer; Matthew Brown; Matthew Morgan; Matt Miller; Tig Moore; Brady Wills
- Website: Official website

The Motels are an American new wave band from Berkeley, California, that is best known for the singles "Only the Lonely" and "Suddenly Last Summer", each of which peaked at No. 9 on the Billboard Hot 100, in 1982 and 1983, respectively. In 1980, The Motels' song "Total Control" reached No. 7 on the Australian chart (for two weeks), and their song "Danger" reached No. 15 on the French chart.

Martha Davis, the lead singer, reformed a version of the band called "The Motels featuring Martha Davis" in 1998 and toured under that name with various lineups of musicians. Since 2013, they have been billed as Martha Davis and The Motels.

== History ==
=== First incarnation ===

The first incarnation of The Motels formed in Berkeley, California in 1971. Lisa Brenneis (bass) persuaded Dean Chamberlain (lead guitar), Chuck Wada (rhythm guitar) and Martha Davis (vocals, guitar) to form a band (then called The Warfield Foxes). Hoping for better exposure and seeking a recording contract, the Warfield Foxes moved to Los Angeles in 1975. While in Los Angeles, Lisa Brenneis left and the band first changed its name to Angels of Mercy, then to The Motels. Both Davis and Wada contributed original songs to the band's repertoire. Around this time, bass guitarist Richard D'Andrea and drummer Robert Newman joined The Motels, making the band a quintet (Chamberlain, D'Andrea, Davis, Newman and Wada).

The Motels and two other local bands, The Pop and The Dogs, participated in a self-produced show titled Radio Free Hollywood at Troupers Hall, a performance space at a home for retired actors. Before this show, few if any unsigned bands played local high-profile clubs like the Whisky a Go Go and The Roxy Theatre. The Motels then appeared on Rodney Bingenheimer's popular radio show on KROQ. The Motels recorded a demo for Warner Bros. Records, but the record label turned it down. Capitol Records offered the band a recording contract. At this point, The Motels rejected the Capitol offer and disbanded, citing musical differences among the band members. One song from their Warner Bros. demo, "Counting", was included on the Rhino Records compilation Saturday Night Pogo, released in 1978. Another demo from this line-up, "Every Day Star", was released on their compilation CD Anthologyland.

Chamberlain created the band Code Blue, which signed a contract with Warner Bros. Records. D'Andrea joined the Pits and later the Know. Newman became an art director and designer and Wada a financial advisor. Brenneis wrote a series of books on Final Cut Pro editing software.

=== Second incarnation ===
In March 1978, Davis and lead guitarist Jeff Jourard (formerly of a pre-fame version of Tom Petty and the Heartbreakers) decided to reform The Motels. Extensive auditions resulted in a new line-up of the band, consisting of Jourard's brother Marty, who played both the saxophone and keyboards, Michael Goodroe on bass, and Brian Glascock on drums.

Short on funds, The Motels shared rehearsal space with The Go-Go's at The Masque in Hollywood. They played in Chinatown, Los Angeles, at Madame Wong's restaurant/nightclub. The Motels began to draw crowds and in May 1979 the band signed another contract with Capitol Records. Four months later, Capitol released The Motels' debut album, The Motels. Their first single, "Closets and Bullets", made no impact on the charts, but their second single release, "Total Control", reached the Top 20 in France and the Top 10 in Australia.

In 1980, Jourard was replaced as lead guitarist in The Motels by Davis' boyfriend Tim McGovern and the band went back into the recording studio to record their second album, Careful. Released in June 1980, the album climbed to the No. 45 spot on the Billboard 200 chart in the U.S. In Europe and the UK, the singles "Days Are OK" and "Whose Problem?" became Top 50 hits; "Whose Problem?" was also a top hit in Australia and "Danger" was a Top 20 hit in France.

The Motels hired record producer Val Garay for their third album, Apocalypso. The album was scheduled for release in November 1981. However, Capitol Records rejected the album, claiming that it was "not commercial enough" and "too weird".

The Motels attempted to re-record the rejected album Apocalypso. During this process, Davis and McGovern's relationship dissolved and by December 1981 McGovern had left The Motels (McGovern subsequently formed the band Burning Sensations). With extensive use of studio musicians, the band re-recorded Apocalypso. Craig Krampf, according to Garay, played all the drums on the record; Waddy Wachtel was featured on guitar, while bass duties were split among two studio players. Adrian Peritore (also known as Guy Perry) was hired in late January 1982 and played lead guitar on some of the tracks, including "He Hit Me". Capitol released the album on April 5, 1982 under the new title All Four One.

All Four One (1982), the band's best-selling album

The first single from All Four One was "Only the Lonely", which reached No. 9 on the Billboard Hot 100 and No. 6 on the Billboard Top Tracks chart. The song "Mission of Mercy" also reached No. 23 on the Top Tracks chart. In addition, two other singles, "Take the L" and "Forever Mine", also reached the Billboard Hot 100.

The release of All Four One coincided with the emergence of MTV on U.S. television. As a result, Capitol created music videos for both "Only the Lonely" and "Take the L". In 1982, Davis won a Best Performance in a Music Video award category at the American Music Awards for her performance in the "Only the Lonely" video. During 1982, the band added keyboardist/guitarist Scott Thurston, formerly of Iggy and The Stooges, to their touring line-up.

Garay was now firmly in control of album and video production for The Motels, owned Record One, the studio where they recorded, and the rehearsal space where they prepared. After the band fired Fritz Turner Management, Garay also became the band manager. In February 1983, the band returned to the recording studio and released the album Little Robbers later that year. Again, Garay made extensive use of session musicians. For albums, The Motels line-up was Davis and a revolving cast of musicians; for concerts there was a definitive band that included Thurston on additional keyboards and guitars.

"Suddenly Last Summer", the first single from the album, hit No. 9 on the Hot 100 in the United States, with the album peaking at No. 1 on Billboard's Album Rock Tracks chart and going gold in the U.S., Canada, and several other countries. In August 1983, at the insistence of Garay, David Platshon was added on drums with Glascock reluctantly moving over to percussion.

The first leg of the Little Robbers tour, which included an appearance on Saturday Night Live, started in January 1984 but ended abruptly in February with the firing of Garay as manager for personal reasons. Drummer Platshon was dropped, and Glascock resumed his spot on the drum throne. The band continued performing under new management, and they recorded songs for two film soundtracks: "Long Day" was recorded for Moscow on the Hudson and "In the Jungle" was recorded for Teachers. By mid-summer, the band was back in the recording studio working on new material.

In late 1984, Capitol Records brought in producer Richie Zito in an attempt to maintain the band's commercialism. After more than a year of recording, the group released their fifth album Shock in September 1985. The first single from the album was "Shame", which reached No. 21 on the Billboard Hot 100 and No. 10 on the Top Rock Tracks chart in the U.S. Two other singles were taken from the album: the title track "Shock" and "Icy Red", with the former peaking at No. 84 on the Billboard chart. From early 1986 to February 1987, The Motels worked on songs for a planned sixth album. However, on February 13, 1987, Martha Davis took each member of the band in turn to a local bar to notify them that she had decided to dissolve the band and go solo.

All of the members of the 1982–1987 line-up of the band reunited in 2004 for an appearance on VH1's Bands Reunited; rejoining Davis were Michael Goodroe, Marty Jourard, Brian Glascock and Adrian Peritore (a.k.a. Guy Perry). On August 9, 2011, the original version of The Motels' third album, Apocalypso, was released by Omnivore Recordings.

=== Martha Davis' solo career ===
Davis released her first solo album entitled Policy in November 1987. Musicians who worked with her included Clarence Clemons, Kenny G and Charlie Sexton. In November, she had a No. 8 hit in Australia with "Don't Tell Me the Time", but in the U.S. the song only reached No. 80. "Just Like You" reached No. 47 on the Mainstream Rock Chart. The album's critical reception was lukewarm, with many reviewers praising Davis' voice but noting that the album sounded lightweight and lacked atmospheric punch. Soon afterwards, Davis asked to be released from her contract with Capitol Records.

After leaving Capitol, Davis focused on different music styles and recorded songs for several film soundtracks but it appeared as if her music career was winding down. In the early 1990s she began performing occasional surprise gigs which found her experimenting with new songs that she had written.

Martha Davis has released several albums in the new millennium. She released ...So the Story Goes in 2004, Beautiful Life in 2008, and in 2011, she released a children's music album, Red Frog Presents: 16 Songs for Parents and Children.

=== Third incarnation: The Motels featuring Martha Davis ===
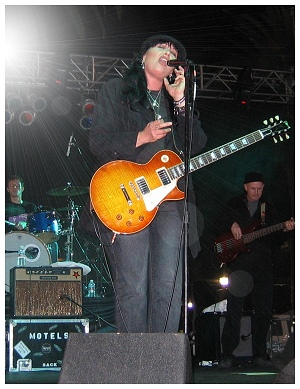
Martha Davis and The Motels, singing at Hollywood Park, 2006

In 1997, Martha Davis began appearing live with a band composed of Erik Lemaire (guitar), Adrian Burke (bass), Jason Loree (drums), and David Van Pattoen (keyboards/guitar). This group began calling themselves "Martha Davis Jr." and later "The Motels" in March 1998. After 1998, the line-up consisted of Mic Taras on lead guitar, Angelo Barbera on bass, Kevin Bowen on keyboards, Michael Barbera on keyboards/saxophone, and Jason Loree on drums. In 1999 Nick LeMieux joined the band on keyboards. The repertoire performed at these gigs consisted almost entirely of new material. In 2001 the band changed to a compact, four piece ensemble with Davis and Taras being accompanied by Fritz Lewak (drums) and David Sutton (bass). By 2004 the band had performed more than 70 concerts and toured in the U.S. and Australia. As of 2006 the band included Davis on vocal and guitar, Nick Johns (bass/keyboard), Eric Gardner (drums), Clint Walsh (guitar), and Jon Siebels (guitar).

In 2005 Davis and the new Motels released an independent CD titled So the Story Goes which sold out. Sony Records also released a live album titled Standing Room Only, which was recorded live in 2006 at the famed Coach House Club in San Juan Capistrano. The Motels featuring Martha Davis also appeared on the U.S. version of Hit Me, Baby, One More Time and toured the U.S. and Australia in 2007. Martha Davis performed at Seattle's Teatro ZinZanni in 2005, for which she collaborated with TZ Maestro Norm Durkee to make the special CD Omnium, which is available only through the Teatro ZinZanni gift shop. In August 2007, she joined other 1970s and 1980s acts for the Australian concert series Countdown Spectacular 2.

The album Clean Modern and Reasonable, issued in September 2007, was the first release under the banner "The Motels" in 22 years. The album contains acoustic versions of past hits, B-sides and Davis solo material, including new recordings of "Take The L", "Only the Lonely", and "Suddenly Last Summer". In April 2008 Martha Davis/The Motels released two new albums on the same day; The Motels' new studio album This and the Martha Davis solo project Beautiful Life. The solo album was billed as a darkly autobiographical journey through Davis' life.

The Motels 2009 summer tour found Martha Davis once again surrounding herself with all new musicians: Felix Mercer (keyboards), Matthew Brown (bass), Matthew Morgan (drums), and Matt Miller (guitar). However, previous members continued to play in the band in a mix-and-match arrangement depending on the venue.

At the end of 2009 and the beginning of 2010, Davis made available two direct to download releases, one of which, "Mr. Grey", was a single from her forthcoming album, then provisionally known as the Jazz CD. She followed this release with an album of children's songs titled Red Frog Presents: 16 Songs for Parents and Children which was released on January 20, 2010, while work on her Jazz CD continued. As of late summer 2011, Davis put her jazz album (rechristened as "I Have My Standards") on hold, but she still plans to release it down the line.

=== Current incarnation: The Motels ===
At the end of 2012, The Motels opened for The Go-Go's at the Hollywood Bowl, their first performance at this venue. Reviews were positive. On her birthday, January 19, 2013, Martha signed with manager Greg Sims of Vesuvio Entertainment. The Motels began 2013 performances on January 25 at the NAMM convention in their "Living Legends" special concert series on the Main Stage. This was the beginning of a new rise in the band's popularity and success. A coast-to-coast summer tour ensued, where they performed with acts such as Bow Wow Wow.

During the 2013 tour, the band was listed in flyers and websites as "Martha Davis and the Motels", with a lineup consisting of Nicholas Johns (bass), Eric Gardner (drums), Clint Walsh (guitar) and Marty Jourard (sax/keyboards). Subsequently, original Motels sax and keyboard player Marty Jourard rejoined the band for many 2014 dates, including a sellout show at the Whisky a Go Go, which was celebrating its 50th anniversary. Jourard continues to be a permanent fixture today. The Whisky a Go Go concert was recorded with Emmy Award-winning cinematographer Roy H. Wagner and with direction by choreographer Denise Faye, known for her work on Chicago and Burlesque. 2014 also included an Australian tour and a summer tour with The Go-Go's dubbed Replay America. The years 2015 and 2016 saw many more concerts, which included a "Lost 80s Live" tour with bands such as Flock of Seagulls, Berlin, Tommy Tutone, and Wang Chung.

Currently, The Motels, under new management, are touring the U.S. playing new material, along with their vast back catalog. The 27-song collection If Not Now Then When was released March 10, 2017, consisting of songs recorded between 2002 and 2006.

In January 2023, a US show was announced: the band will play at the Cruel World Festival in Pasadena, California on May 20, 2023.

In 2024, The Motels toured as part of the Abducted by the 80's tour across the US and Canada with fellow 1980s acts Wang Chung, Men Without Hats, and Naked Eyes.

== Awards ==
- American Music Awards 1982: Best Performance for "Only the Lonely" at the 1982 American Music Awards
- Independent Music Awards 2012: Apocalypso – Best Re-Issue Album
- HMMA Nomination Hollywood Music in Media Awards 2018 :"Punchline"

== Discography ==
- Motels (1979)
- Careful (1980)
- All Four One (1982)
- Little Robbers (1983)
- Shock (1985)
- This (2008)
- Apocalypso (2011)
- If Not Now Then When (2017)
- The Last Few Beautiful Days (2018)
