= Brian Glascock =

British musician (born 1948)

Brian Glascock (born 17 July 1948, Islington, North London) is an English rock drummer for The Gods, Toe Fat, Carmen, Captain Beyond, Soy Cowboy, and primarily for The Motels. He also played on albums by Dolly Parton, Iggy Pop, and Joan Armatrading. He performed in a music video with Nancy Wilson of Heart. He has also performed much session work including The Bee Gees track "How Can You Mend a Broken Heart", along with fellow Juniors guitarist Alan Kendall. He was also the drummer for The Kids of Widney High and played on their second album, "Let's Get Busy."

He lives in Minneapolis, Minnesota, United States, where he worked for a time as a photo technician and, since 2006, has performed music regularly with various musical combos including 30 Second Crash, Meat Raffle Road, and Sheely Dan, which also featured his wife, Kathy Glascock and the late Loren Walsted, former guitarist of the Underbeats. Glascock also plays occasionally with other local bands including the Don King Blues Band, the Senders, the Dire Wolf Band, and was also the drummer for the Ruth Adams Polka Band for a short while.

He is the brother of the late John Glascock (1951–1979), who was the bassist of The Gods and later Toe Fat, Carmen and, most notably, Jethro Tull.
