= David Fincher filmography =

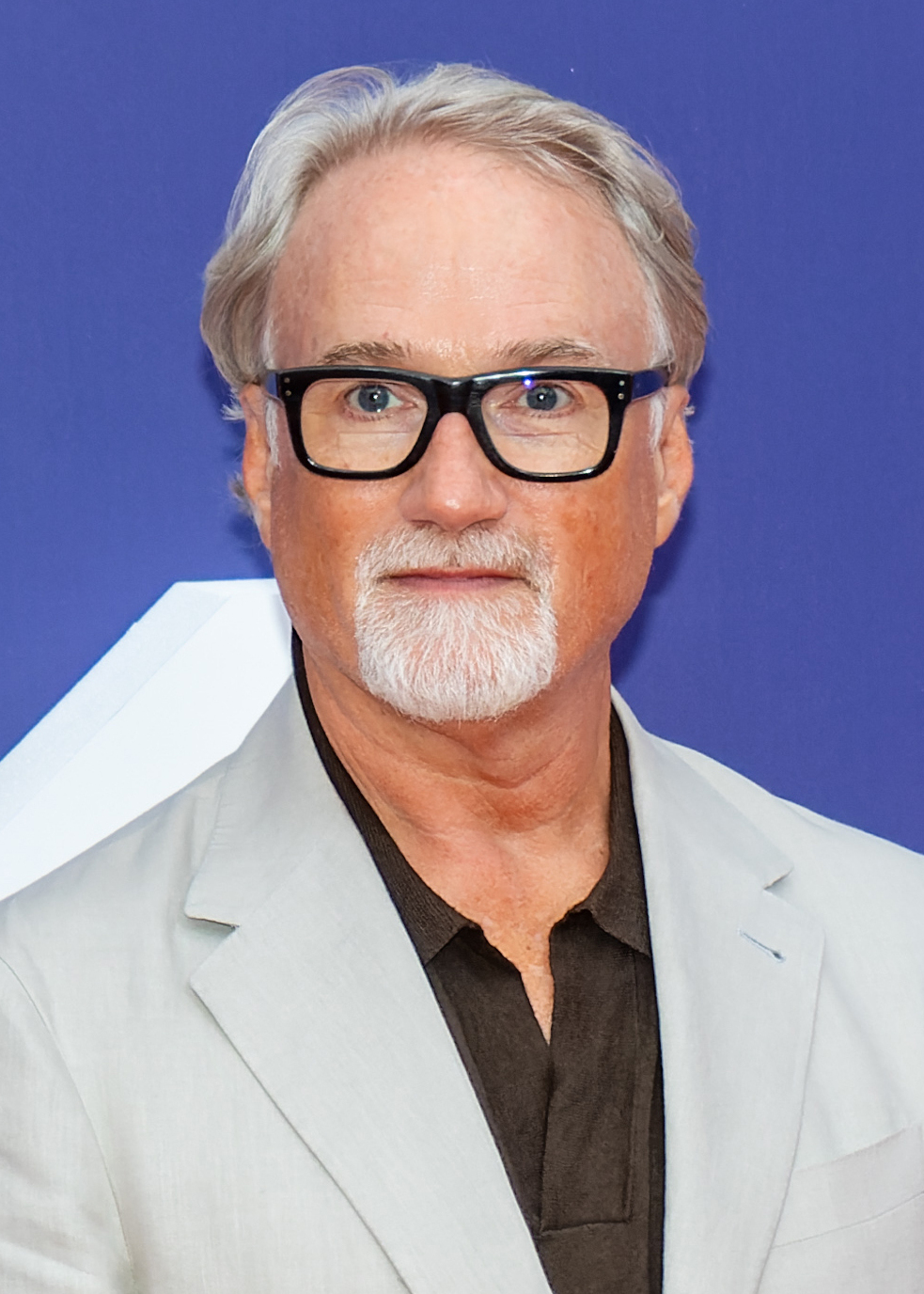
Fincher in 2023

David Fincher is an American film director who has worked on feature films, television series, and music videos. Widely regarded as one of the most preeminent directors of his generation, (Note: Attributed to multiple sources.) his films have collectively grossed over $2.1 billion worldwide and received numerous accolades, including three nominations for the Academy Award for Best Director. He has also received four Primetime Emmy Awards, two Grammy Awards, a BAFTA Award, and a Golden Globe.

He made his directorial debut in 1992 with the science-fiction horror film Alien 3. Since then, he has gone on to direct several films in the thriller genre, including Seven (1995), The Game (1997), Fight Club (1999), Panic Room (2002), Zodiac (2007), The Girl With the Dragon Tattoo (2011), Gone Girl (2014) and The Killer (2023). He has also produced three television series for Netflix: House of Cards (2013–2018), Mindhunter (2017–2019), and Love, Death & Robots (2019).

Outside of feature films, Fincher has directed music videos for artists including The Rolling Stones, Justin Timberlake and Jay-Z—for which he won two Grammy Awards for Best Music Video—Nine Inch Nails, Michael Jackson, Madonna, Sting, and Rick Springfield, among others.

Fincher also made a cameo in the 2009 French animated short film Logorama.

== Film ==
Director

- Alien 3 (1992)
- Seven (1995)
- The Game (1997)
- Fight Club (1999)
- Panic Room (2002)
- Zodiac (2007)
- The Curious Case of Benjamin Button (2008)
- The Social Network (2010)
- The Girl with the Dragon Tattoo (2011)
- Gone Girl (2014)
- Mank (2020)
- The Killer (2023)
- The Further Mis-Adventures of Cliff Booth (2026)

Producer

- Is That Black Enough for You?!? (2022)

Executive producer

- The Hire (2001)
- Lords of Dogtown (2005)
- Love and Other Disasters (2006)
- The Girl in the Spider's Web (2018)

Interviewee

- Murder by Numbers (2004)
- Side by Side (2012)
- Hitchcock/Truffaut (2015)

Cameo roles

Year	Title	Role
1999	Being John Malkovich	Christopher Bing
2002	Full Frontal	Film Director
2009	Logorama	Original Pringles Mascot (voice)

Other credits

Year	Title	Role
1983	Return of the Jedi	Assistant cameraman
1983	Twice Upon a Time	Special photographic effects
1984	Indiana Jones and the Temple of Doom	Matte photography
1984	Caravan of Courage: An Ewok Adventure	Matte photography
1984	The NeverEnding Story	Matte photography assistant

== Television ==
Year	Title	Director	Executive Producer	Notes
2013–2018	House of Cards	Yes	Yes	Directed 2 episodes
2017–2019	Mindhunter	Yes	Yes	Directed 7 episodes
2019–2025	Love, Death & Robots	Yes	Yes	Directed 2 episodes
2021	Voir	No	Yes	

== Music video ==
Year	Title	Artist
1984	"Bop Til You Drop"	Rick Springfield
1985	"Celebrate Youth"	Rick Springfield
1985	"Shame"	The Motels
1985	"Shock"	The Motels
1985	"Dance This World Away"	Rick Springfield
1985	"Charm the Snake"	Christopher Cross
1986	"All the Love"	The Outfield
1986	"We Don't Have to Take Our Clothes Off"	Jermaine Stewart
1986	"Everytime You Cry"	The Outfield
1986	"One Simple Thing"	Stabilizers
1986	"Stay"	Howard Hewett
1987	"She Comes On"	Wire Train
1987	"Endless Nights"	Eddie Money
1987	"Downtown Train"	Patty Smyth
1987	"I Don't Mind at All"	Bourgeois Tagg
1987	"Notorious"	Loverboy
1987	"Love Will Rise Again"	Loverboy
1987	"Johnny B"	The Hooters
1987	"Storybook Love" (from The Princess Bride)	Willy DeVille and Mark Knopfler
1987	"Can I Hold You"	Colin Hay
1987	"No Surrender"	The Outfield
1987	"Say You Will"	Foreigner
1987	"Don't Tell Me the Time"	Martha Davis
1988	"Tell It to the Moon"	Martha Davis
1988	"Heart of Gold"	Johnny Hates Jazz
1988	"Englishman in New York"	Sting
1988	"Shattered Dreams" (second version)	Johnny Hates Jazz
1988	"Get Rhythm"	Ry Cooder
1988	"Most of All"	Jody Watley
1988	"Roll with It"	Steve Winwood
1988	"(It's Just) The Way That You Love Me" (version 1988)	Paula Abdul
1988	"Holding On"	Steve Winwood
1989	"Bamboléo"	Gipsy Kings
1989	"Straight Up"	Paula Abdul
1989	"Real Love"	Jody Watley
1989	"She's a Mystery to Me"	Roy Orbison
1989	"Forever Your Girl"	Paula Abdul
1989	"Express Yourself"	Madonna
1989	"The End of the Innocence"	Don Henley
1989	"Cold Hearted"	Paula Abdul
1989	"(It's Just) The Way That You Love Me" (version 1989)	Paula Abdul
1989	"Oh Father"	Madonna
1989	"Janie's Got a Gun"	Aerosmith
1990	"Heart"	Neneh Cherry
1990	"Vogue"	Madonna
1990	"Cradle of Love"	Billy Idol
1990	"Home"	Iggy Pop
1990	"L.A. Woman"	Billy Idol
1990	"Should She Cry"	Wire Train
1990	"Freedom! '90"	George Michael
1992	"Who Is It"	Michael Jackson
1993	"Bad Girl"	Madonna
1994	"Love Is Strong"	The Rolling Stones
1996	"6th Avenue Heartache"	The Wallflowers
2000	"Judith"	A Perfect Circle
2005	"Only"	Nine Inch Nails
2013	"Suit & Tie"	Justin Timberlake and Jay-Z

== Frequent collaborators ==
Collaborator	Role	Alien 3	Seven	The Game	Fight Club	Panic Room	Zodiac	The Curious Case of Benjamin Button	The Social Network	The Girl with the Dragon Tattoo	Gone Girl	Mank	The Killer	The Further Mis-Adventures of Cliff Booth	Total
Kirk Baxter	Editor							Yes	Yes	Yes	Yes	Yes	Yes	Yes	7
Donald Graham Burt	Production designer						Yes	Yes	Yes	Yes	Yes	Yes	Yes	Yes	8
Ceán Chaffin	Producer			Yes	Yes	Yes	Yes	Yes	Yes	Yes	Yes	Yes	Yes	Yes	11
Jeff Cronenweth	Cinematographer				Yes				Yes	Yes	Yes			Yes	5
Charles Dance	Actor	Yes										Yes			2
Charles S. Dutton	Actor	Yes	Yes												2
James Haygood	Editor			Yes	Yes	Yes									3
Ren Klyce	Sound designer		Yes	Yes	Yes	Yes	Yes	Yes	Yes	Yes	Yes	Yes	Yes	Yes	12
Laray Mayfield	Casting director				Yes	Yes	Yes	Yes	Yes	Yes	Yes	Yes	Yes	Yes	10
Holt McCallany	Actor	Yes			Yes									Yes	3
Erik Messerschmidt	Cinematographer											Yes	Yes	Yes	3
Brad Pitt	Actor		Yes		Yes			Yes						Yes	4
Trent Reznor	Composer								Yes	Yes	Yes	Yes	Yes	Yes	6
Atticus Ross	Composer								Yes	Yes	Yes	Yes	Yes	Yes	6
Harris Savides	Cinematographer			Yes			Yes								2
Howard Shore	Composer		Yes	Yes		Yes									3
Bob Stephenson	Actor		Yes		Yes		Yes	Yes							4
Bob Wagner	Assistant director				Yes	Yes	Yes	Yes	Yes	Yes					6
Angus Wall	Editor					Yes	Yes	Yes	Yes	Yes					5

== Reception ==
=== Critical reception ===
Film	Rotten Tomatoes	Metacritic
Alien 3	48% (63 reviews)	59 (20 reviews)
Seven	82% (80 reviews)	65 (22 reviews)
The Game	75% (61 reviews)	61 (19 reviews)
Fight Club	79% (178 reviews)	66 (35 reviews)
Panic Room	75% (187 reviews)	65 (36 reviews)
Zodiac	89% (257 reviews)	78 (40 reviews)
The Curious Case of Benjamin Button	71% (258 reviews)	70 (37 reviews)
The Social Network	96% (327 reviews)	95 (42 reviews)
The Girl with the Dragon Tattoo	87% (253 reviews)	71 (41 reviews)
Gone Girl	87% (364 reviews)	79 (49 reviews)
Mank	83% (351 reviews)	79 (50 reviews)
The Killer	85% (294 reviews)	73 (58 reviews)
The Further Mis-Adventures of Cliff Booth	84% (80 reviews)	69 (32 reviews)

=== Box office performance ===
Film	Release date	Box office gross			Budget
Film	Release date	North America	Other territories	Worldwide	Budget
Alien 3	May 22, 1992	$55,473,545	$104,340,953	$159,814,498	$50 million
Seven	September 22, 1995	$100,125,643	$227,186,216	$327,311,859	$33 million
The Game	September 12, 1997	$48,323,648	$61,100,000	$109,423,648	$50 million
Fight Club	October 15, 1999	$37,030,102	$63,823,651	$100,853,753	$63 million
Panic Room	March 29, 2002	$96,397,334	$100,000,081	$196,397,415	$48 million
Zodiac	March 2, 2007	$33,080,084	$51,705,830	$84,785,914	$65 million
The Curious Case of Benjamin Button	December 25, 2008	$127,509,326	$206,422,757	$333,932,083	$150 million
The Social Network	October 1, 2010	$96,962,694	$127,957,621	$224,920,315	$40 million
The Girl with the Dragon Tattoo	December 20, 2011	$102,068,888	$130,101,637	$232,617,430	$90 million
Gone Girl	October 3, 2014	$167,238,510	$199,700,000	$366,938,510	$61 million
Mank	November 13, 2020	N/D	$99,752	$99,752	$25 million
The Killer	October 27, 2023	N/D	$755,534	$755,534	$10 million
The Further Mis-Adventures of Cliff Booth	November 25, 2026	TBA	TBA	TBA	$200 million
Total		$858,764,264	$1,246,868,761	$2,137,010,115	$885 million

== See also ==
- David Fincher's unrealized projects
- List of awards and nominations received by David Fincher
