= Don't Ask Out Loud =

1988 single by Martha Davis

Single by Martha Davis

from the album Policy
- B-side: "Rebecca"
- Released: 1988
- Length: 4:14
- Label: Capitol
- Songwriters: Martha Davis; Roger Bruno; Ellen Schwartz
- Producer: Richie Zito

Martha Davis singles chronology
| "Just Like You" (1988) | "Don't Ask Out Loud" (1988) | "What Money Might Buy" (1988) |

"Don't Ask Out Loud" is a song by American singer-songwriter Martha Davis, which was released in 1988 as the fourth single from her debut solo studio album Policy (1987). The song was written by Davis, Roger Bruno and Ellen Schwartz, and produced by Richie Zito. Released in Australia only, "Don't Ask Out Loud" peaked at number 90 on the Music Report chart.

== Background ==
Davis cowrote "Don't Ask Out Loud" with the songwriting couple Roger Bruno and Ellen Schwartz during a period when she was meeting different songwriters to potentially collaborate with. Davis recalled in 1987, "Ellen and Roger came over to my house one day. Ellen sat down at the keyboard and started playing this wonderful music."

Davis was inspired to write the song's lyrics after having recently watched the British dystopian science fiction film Nineteen Eighty-Four on cable, which Davis described as "devastating", "very dark" and "beautifully shot". She commented, "The song is my interpretation of a Nineteen Eighty-Four situation. You know, don't ask out loud, someone might hear you... keeping the children huddled under your arm and telling them to be quiet because you can't be found doing this or being here."

== Critical reception ==
In a review of Policy, Hugh Wyatt of the Daily News described "Don't Ask Out Loud" as a "sultry" track which "recall[s] Quarterflash". Greg Burliuk of The Whig-Standard commented that "Kenny G's mournful saxophone provides a bluesy background for Davis's sad vocals". Randal Smathers, writing for the University of Alberta's student paper The Gateway noted Kenny G's appearance on the track and added that "although it does not weaken the knees the way great sax work can, the instrument provides a nice counterpoint to Davis's throaty vocals". In Australia, Amanda Lynch of The Canberra Times noted that the song, along with "Tell It to the Moon", provides "an emotionally-charged showcase for Davis' passionate voice and considerable songwriting talents".

== Track listing ==
7–inch single (Australia)

1. "Don't Ask Out Loud" – 4:14
2. "Rebecca" – 3:20

== Personnel ==
Credits are adapted from the Policy CD liner notes and the 7-inch single sleeve notes.

"Don't Ask Out Loud"

- Martha Davis – vocals
- Marlena Jeter, Phyllis St. James, Carmen Twillie – backing vocals
- Richie Zito – guitars
- Gary Chang – synthesizers
- Kenny G – saxophone
- Randy Jackson – bass
- Vinnie Colaiuta – drums
- Paulinho da Costa – percussion

Production

- Richie Zito – producer
- Phil Kaffel – engineer
- David Leonard – mixing
- Stephen Marcussen – mastering

Other

- Bobby Woods for Significorp – art direction
- Ron Derhacopian – photography

== Charts ==
| Chart (1988) | Peak position |
|---|---|
| Australia (Music Report) | 90 |
