= List of awards and nominations received by David Fincher =

David Fincher awards and nominations
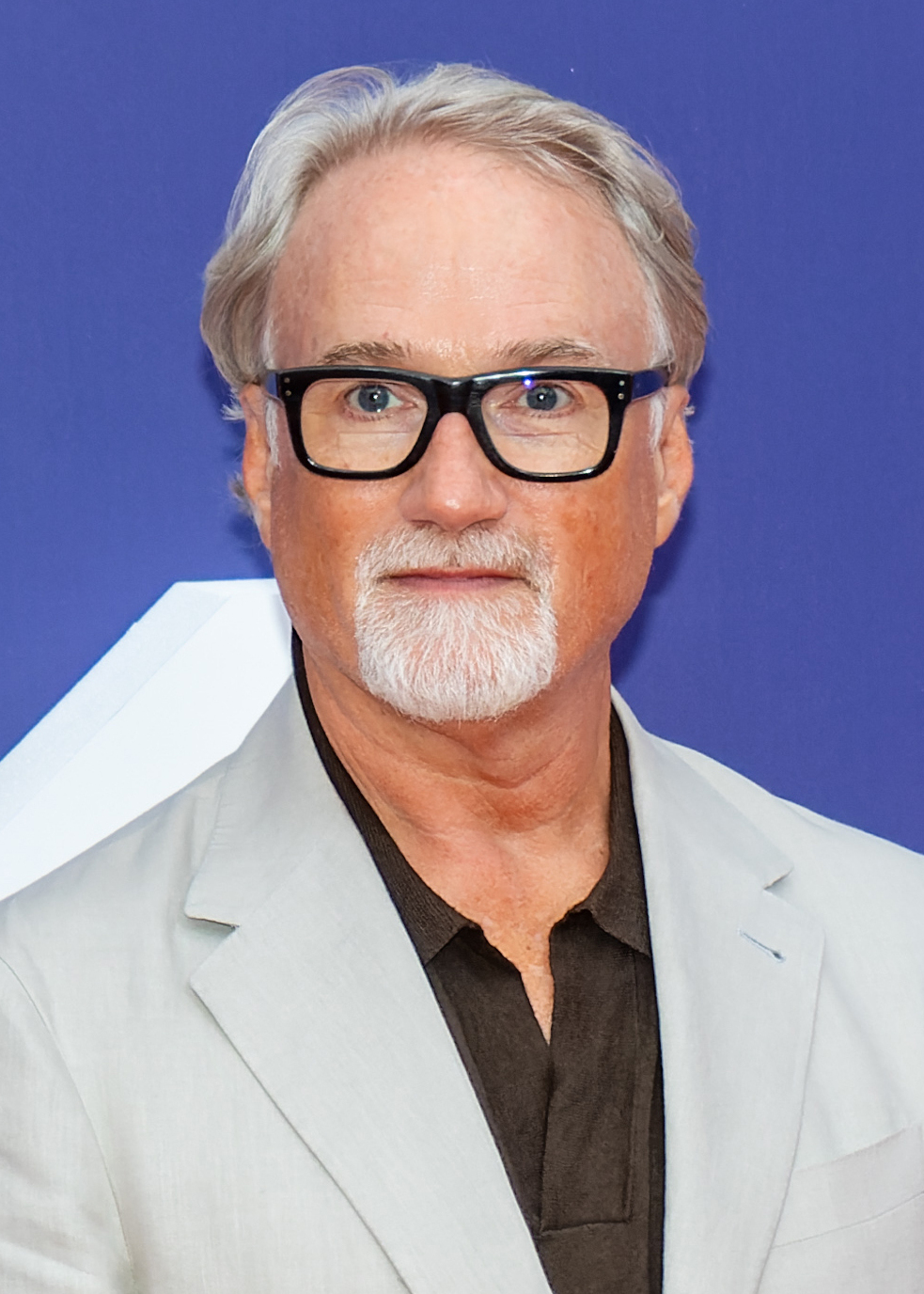
- Fincher in 2023
Awards and nominations
Award	Wins	Nominations
Academy Awards	0	3
BAFTA Awards	1	4
Critics' Choice	1	4
Emmy Awards	4	7
Grammy Awards	2	3
Golden Globes	1	4

Totals (Note: Certain award groups do not simply award one winner. They acknowledge several different recipients, have runners-up, and have third place. Since this is a specific recognition and is different from losing an award, runner-up mentions are considered wins in this award tally. For simplification and to avoid errors, each award in this list has been presumed to have had a prior nomination.)
- Wins: 32
- Nominations: 86

David Fincher is an American film director. Widely regarded as one of the preeminent directors of his generation, (Note: Attributed to multiple sources.) his films have collectively grossed over $2.1 billion worldwide and received numerous accolades, including three nominations for the Academy Award for Best Director. He has also received four Primetime Emmy Awards, two Grammy Awards, a BAFTA Award, and a Golden Globe. His films Zodiac and The Social Network are ranked in BBC's 2016 poll of the greatest motion pictures since 2000.

Fincher started his career directing music videos before transitioning his career in film becoming known for making stylish thrillers and neo-noirs. He made his feature-length directorial debut with the science fiction horror film Alien 3, the third film in the Alien film franchise, for which he was nominated for the Saturn Award for Best Director. He established himself as director of acclaimed mystery thriller neo-noirs films with Se7en (1995), The Game (1997), Fight Club (1999), Panic Room (2002), and Zodiac (2007), the later of which earned him nominations for the Chicago Film Critics Association for Best Director. The film also competed for the Palme d'Or at the 2007 Cannes Film Festival.

He earned attention for directing the romantic fantasy drama The Curious Case of Benjamin Button (2008) for which he was nominated for his first Academy Award for Best Director along with the British Academy Film Award, the Directors Guild of America, Critics' Choice Movie Award and Golden Globe Award for Best Director. He gained widespread critical acclaim when he directed the biographical drama The Social Network (2010) for which he won the BAFTA Award, the Golden Globe Award, and Critics' Choice Award with his second nomination for the Academy Award for Best Director. With psychological thriller The Girl with the Dragon Tattoo (2011) he was nominated for the Directors Guild Award, and the thriller Gone Girl (2014) he was nominated for the Golden Globe Award. He received a third nomination for the Academy Award for Best Director for the Netflix drama Mank (2020).

On television, he was instrumental in the creation of Netflix political drama series House of Cards (2013–2018). He won the Primetime Emmy Award for Outstanding Directing for a Drama Series for "Chapter 1" of House of Cards at the 65th Primetime Emmy Awards. He was nominated for five Primetime Emmy Awards for Outstanding Drama Series and two British Academy Television Awards for Best International Programme. For the Netflix animated series Love, Death & Robots (2019–), he won three Primetime Emmy Awards for Outstanding Short Form Animated Program.

Also known for his work on music videos, he won two Grammy Awards for Best Music Video for "Love Is Strong" (1995) by The Rolling Stones at the 37th Annual Grammy Awards and "Suit & Tie" (2014) by Justin Timberlake featuring Jay-Z at the 56th Annual Grammy Awards. He was Grammy-nominated for "Oh Father" (1991) by Madonna at the 33rd Annual Grammy Awards. He also won three MTV Video Music Awards for Best Direction for "Express Yourself" in 1989 and "Vogue" in 1991 both by Madonna as well as and "Suit & Tie" by Justin Timberlake feat. Jay Z in 2013.

== Major associations ==
=== Academy Awards ===
Year	Category	Nominated work	Result	Ref.
2008	Best Director	The Curious Case of Benjamin Button	Nominated	
2010	Best Director	The Social Network	Nominated	
2020	Best Director	Mank	Nominated	

=== BAFTA Awards ===
Year	Category	Nominated work	Result	Ref.
British Academy Film Awards
2008	Best Direction	The Curious Case of Benjamin Button	Nominated	
2010	Best Direction	The Social Network	Won	
British Academy Television Awards
2014	Best International Programme	House of Cards	Nominated	
2015	Best International Programme	House of Cards	Nominated	

=== Critics' Choice Awards ===
Year	Category	Nominated work	Result	Ref.
2008	Best Director	The Curious Case of Benjamin Button	Nominated	
2010	Best Director	The Social Network	Won	
2014	Best Director	Gone Girl	Nominated	
2020	Best Director	Mank	Nominated	

=== Emmy Awards ===
Year	Category	Nominated work	Result	Ref.
Primetime Emmy Awards
2013	Outstanding Directing for a Drama Series	House of Cards (episode: "Chapter One")	Won	
2013	Outstanding Drama Series	House of Cards (season one)	Nominated	
2014	Outstanding Drama Series	House of Cards (season two)	Nominated	
2015	Outstanding Drama Series	House of Cards (season three)	Nominated	
2016	Outstanding Drama Series	House of Cards (season four)	Nominated	
2017	Outstanding Drama Series	House of Cards (season five)	Nominated	
Primetime Creative Arts Emmy Awards
2019	Outstanding Short Form Animated Program	Love, Death & Robots	Won	
2021	Outstanding Short Form Animated Program	Love, Death & Robots	Won	
2022	Outstanding Short Form Animated Program	Love, Death & Robots	Won	
2025	Outstanding Animated Program	Love, Death & Robots	Nominated	

=== Golden Globe Awards ===
Year	Category	Nominated work	Result	Ref.
2008	Best Director	The Curious Case of Benjamin Button	Nominated	
2010	Best Director	The Social Network	Won	
2014	Best Director	Gone Girl	Nominated	
2020	Best Director	Mank	Nominated	

=== Grammy Awards ===
Year	Category	Nominated work	Result	Ref.
1991	Best Music Video	"Oh Father", Madonna	Nominated	
1995	Best Music Video	"Love Is Strong", The Rolling Stones	Won	
2014	Best Music Video	"Suit & Tie", Justin Timberlake featuring Jay-Z	Won	

== Critics awards ==
Organizations	Year	Category	Work	Result	Ref.
Boston Society of Film Critics	2010	Best Director	The Social Network	Won	
Chicago Film Critics Association	2007	Best Director	Zodiac	Nominated	
Chicago Film Critics Association	2008	Best Director	The Curious Case of Benjamin Button	Nominated	
Chicago Film Critics Association	2010	Best Director	The Social Network	Won	
Chicago Film Critics Association	2014	Best Director	Gone Girl	Nominated	
Dallas–Fort Worth Film Critics Association	2008	Best Director	The Curious Case of Benjamin Button	Nominated	
Dallas–Fort Worth Film Critics Association	2010	Best Director	The Social Network	Won	
Dallas–Fort Worth Film Critics Association	2014	Best Director	Gone Girl	Nominated	
Dallas–Fort Worth Film Critics Association	2020	Best Director	Mank	Nominated	
Florida Film Critics Circle	2010	Best Director	The Social Network	Won	
Iowa Film Critics Association	2014	Best Director	Gone Girl	Runner-up	
Las Vegas Film Critics Society	2010	Best Director	The Social Network	Won	
London Film Critics' Circle	2007	Best Director	Zodiac	Nominated	
London Film Critics' Circle	2008	Best Director	The Curious Case of Benjamin Button	Won	
London Film Critics' Circle	2010	Best Director	The Social Network	Won	
London Film Critics' Circle	2020	Best Director	Mank	Nominated	
Los Angeles Film Critics Association	2010	Best Director	The Social Network	Won	
National Board of Review	2008	Best Director	The Curious Case of Benjamin Button	Won	
National Board of Review	2010	Best Director	The Social Network	Won	
National Society of Film Critics	2010	Best Director	The Social Network	Won	
New York Film Critics Circle	2008	Best Director	The Curious Case of Benjamin Button	Nominated	
New York Film Critics Circle	2010	Best Director	The Social Network	Won	
Online Film Critics Society	1999	Best Director	Fight Club	Nominated	
Online Film Critics Society	2007	Best Director	Zodiac	Nominated	
Online Film Critics Society	2008	Best Director	The Curious Case of Benjamin Button	Nominated	
Online Film Critics Society	2010	Best Director	The Social Network	Won	
Phoenix Film Critics Society	2010	Best Director	The Social Network	Nominated	
Phoenix Film Critics Society	2014	Best Director	Gone Girl	Nominated	
San Francisco Film Critics Circle	2010	Best Director	The Social Network	Won	
San Diego Film Critics Society	2010	Best Director	The Social Network	Nominated	
San Diego Film Critics Society	2014	Best Director	Gone Girl	Nominated	
St. Louis Film Critics Association	2010	Best Director	The Social Network	Won	
St. Louis Film Critics Association	2014	Best Director	Gone Girl	Nominated	
Toronto Film Critics Association	2007	Best Director	Zodiac	Nominated	
Toronto Film Critics Association	2010	Best Director	The Social Network	Won	
Vancouver Film Critics Circle	2008	Best Director	The Curious Case of Benjamin Button	Won	
Vancouver Film Critics Circle	2010	Best Director	The Social Network	Won	
Vancouver Film Critics Circle	2020	Best Director	Mank	Nominated	
Washington D.C. Area Film Critics Association	2010	Best Director	The Social Network	Won	
Washington D.C. Area Film Critics Association	2014	Best Director	Gone Girl	Nominated	

== Miscellaneous awards ==
Organizations	Year	Category	Work	Result	Ref.
Cannes Film Festival	2007	Palme d'Or	Zodiac	Nominated	
César Awards	2010	Best Foreign Film	The Social Network	Won	
César Awards	2023	Honorary César	Himself	Honored	
David di Donatello	2010	Best Foreign Film	The Social Network	Nominated	
Directors Guild of America Awards	2009	Outstanding Directing – Feature Film	The Curious Case of Benjamin Button	Nominated	
Directors Guild of America Awards	2011	Outstanding Directing – Feature Film	The Social Network	Nominated	
Directors Guild of America Awards	2012	Outstanding Directing – Feature Film	The Girl with the Dragon Tattoo	Nominated	
Directors Guild of America Awards	2013	Outstanding Directing – Drama Series	House of Cards	Nominated	
Directors Guild of America Awards	2021	Outstanding Directing – Feature Film	Mank	Nominated	
Empire Awards	2008	Best Director	Zodiac	Nominated	
Empire Awards	2011	Best Director	The Social Network	Nominated	
Hugo Award	1992	Best Dramatic Presentation	Alien 3	Nominated	
MTV Video Music Awards	1989	Best Direction in a Video	"Express Yourself" (by Madonna)	Won	
MTV Video Music Awards	1989	Best Direction in a Video	"Real Love" (by Jody Watley)	Nominated	
MTV Video Music Awards	1989	Best Direction in a Video	"Roll with It" (by Steve Winwood)	Nominated	
MTV Video Music Awards	1990	Best Direction in a Video	"Vogue" (by Madonna)	Won	
MTV Video Music Awards	1990	Best Direction in a Video	"The End of the Innocence" (by Don Henley)	Nominated	
MTV Video Music Awards	1990	Best Direction in a Video	"Janie's Got a Gun" (by Aerosmith)	Nominated	
MTV Video Music Awards	1991	Best Direction in a Video	"Freedom! '90" (by George Michael)	Nominated	
MTV Video Music Awards	2013	Best Direction in a Video	"Suit & Tie" (by Justin Timberlake featuring Jay Z)	Won	
Peabody Awards	2013	Area of Excellence	House of Cards	Won	
Producers Guild of America Awards	2013	Best Episodic Drama	House of Cards	Nominated	
Producers Guild of America Awards	2014	Best Episodic Drama	House of Cards	Nominated	
Producers Guild of America Awards	2015	Best Episodic Drama	House of Cards	Nominated	
Producers Guild of America Awards	2016	Best Episodic Drama	House of Cards	Nominated	
Satellite Awards	2010	Best Director	The Social Network	Won	
Satellite Awards	2015	Best Director	Gone Girl	Nominated	
Satellite Awards	2021	Best Director	Mank	Nominated	
Saturn Awards	1992	Best Director	Alien 3	Nominated	
Saturn Awards	1995	Best Director	Seven	Nominated	
Saturn Awards	2008	Best Director	The Curious Case of Benjamin Button	Nominated	
Venice Film Festival	2023	The Killer	Golden Lion	Nominated	

== Awards and nominations received by Fincher's films ==
Awards and nominations received by Fincher's films
Year	Title	Academy Awards		BAFTA Awards		Golden Globe Awards	
Year	Title	Nominations	Wins	Nominations	Wins	Nominations	Wins
1992	Alien 3	1		1			
1995	Seven	1		1			
1999	Fight Club	1					
2008	The Curious Case of Benjamin Button	13	3	11	3	5	
2010	The Social Network	8	3	6	3	6	4
2011	The Girl with the Dragon Tattoo	5	1	2		2	
2014	Gone Girl	1		2		4	
2020	Mank	10	2	6	1	6	
Total		40	9	29	7	23	4

== Directed Academy Award performances ==
Under Fincher's direction, these actors have received Academy Award nominations for their performances in the respective roles.

Year	Performer	Film	Result
Academy Award for Best Actor
2008	Brad Pitt	The Curious Case of Benjamin Button	Nominated
2010	Jesse Eisenberg	The Social Network	Nominated
2020	Gary Oldman	Mank	Nominated
Academy Award for Best Actress
2011	Rooney Mara	The Girl with the Dragon Tattoo	Nominated
2014	Rosamund Pike	Gone Girl	Nominated
Academy Award for Best Supporting Actress
2008	Taraji P. Henson	The Curious Case of Benjamin Button	Nominated
2020	Amanda Seyfried	Mank	Nominated

== See also ==
- David Fincher filmography
- David Fincher's unrealized projects
