= Interpretations of Fight Club =

Academic analyses of Fight Club

The 1999 American film Fight Club, directed by David Fincher, has been subjected to critical analysis for its social commentary about modern American life. The film's themes of identity crisis, masculinity, and anti-consumerism have received various interpretations. Academic Jans B. Wager describes the film as retro-noir, while Keith Gandal defines it as a "slumming trauma". Cultural critics Henry Giroux and Imre Szeman assert that Fight Club focuses too much on consumerist culture as society's problem. Academic Robert von Dassanowsky describes Fight Club as an examination of European fascism.

== Genre classifications ==
=== Retro-noir ===
According to Jans B. Wager, Fight Club exhibits several film noir characteristics. The film's narrator is a male protagonist who provides a subjective voice-over. He is involved in "an erotic triangle" with "a female object of desire" (Marla Singer) and a male antagonist (Tyler Durden). The masculinity in the film differs from noir films by focusing on the upper middle class instead of the lower middle class or the working class. Both of the narrator's counterparts are simultaneously like him and dangerous to him, and the plot takes place in "an urban, crumbling, criminal milieu". With these characteristics, Fight Club masquerades as neo-noir. It is instead best classified as a retro-noir since its presentation of gender roles is "diametrically opposed" to neo-noir films, which in contrast "allow their protagonists to survive, thrive, and commit or solve crimes, with and without male companionship or assistance". The films also present a "more organic" heterosexual coupling than Fight Club.

The female character is introduced as a femme fatale, wearing a dress, hat, and sunglasses, smoking a cigarette, and possessing "voluptuous" red lips. Her presence, regardless of "action or agency", is meant to show that "she is the source of all the problems for the narrator". The femme fatale appearance at the beginning is replaced by a heroin chic appearance for the rest of the film. The male antagonist appears in direct response to the "intrusion" of this female object of desire, recalling how in some noir films, the femme fatale appearance is a catalyst to the everyman's entry into "a criminal and dangerous world". The female character is presented as "necessary but peripheral" since she is never fully aware of what is happening. Cultural critic Henry Giroux describes the nature of Marla Singer as "an ultra-conservative version of post-1960s femininity that signifies the antithesis of domestic security, comfort, and sexual passitivity". This brand of post-feminism ties into "commodities that call for and support constant body maintenance (femininity)". Marla Singer finds her commodities in others' laundry or thrift stores, so "she transgresses both through her sexual appetites and her flaunting of the consumption-oriented conventions of femininity".

=== Slumming trauma ===
Keith Gandal defines Fight Club as a "slumming trauma" in the sense that it falls between the genres of the sentimental slumming drama and the trauma film. Sentimental slumming dramas avoid "the sordid" and "degraded environment and social interactions". They contain "wholesome" heroes, who and whose counterparts usually have "young, beautiful faces and bodies" that do not bruise or do recover easily from bruising. Examples of sentimental slumming dramas include Titanic, Shakespeare in Love, and Forrest Gump. In contrast, trauma films have "a penchant for disfigurement and disease", and they exhibit "blasted" nihilism in which the films' characters are paralyzed by trauma and even become "traumatizers" themselves. Examples of trauma films include Gummo, Kids, and Welcome to the Dollhouse.

While Fight Club expresses "radical" slumming notions through lines like, "Only when you've lost everything are you free to do anything," the film is hostile to sentimental slumming. Gandal writes of the film's perception, "Sentimentalism is an insidious lie that denies the realities of human life and the human body as it promises a fairy-tale experience that doesn't exist." Additionally, one of Fight Club's main characters, Tyler Durden, advocates methods of "self-actualization and self-discovery", which are radical compared to those of "wholesome" heroes. While slumming dramas avoid physically degraded conditions, Fight Club embraces the conditions in a manner that "mystifies and romanticizes the sordid". This approach differentiates from trauma films' approach of these conditions. Instead of the characters being paralyzed by traumas, the traumas are "romantic" traumas that "shake people awake and remind them that they are alive and full of possibility". Through fight clubs, "the desecrated body is a central image in slumming trauma" with injuries being fetishes in the genre.

The romanticism is a paradox in the slumming trauma genre; the characters identify with decay as "purifying" and identify with the degraded as "transcendent". The paradox is unstable; there are suggestions of "humiliation and self-loathing". The love object Marla Singer accuses the narrator of having "serious emotional problems", and there is anger among fight club members that they will not be "millionaires and movie gods and rock stars". The narrator discovers that celebrity treatment as leader of the fight clubs prompts the question of how the narrator cannot be special. Gandal elaborates on the double-sided nature that results from the paradox: "Either the narrator is discovering his aliveness in the body's vulnerability and power to harm, or he is degrading his body and others' out of traumatic self-loathing and depression... Either the film is pushing humility or indulging in a martial, even fascist, fantasy of celebrity."

Love objects are degraded in trauma films, but in Fight Club, degradation does not last to the film's conclusion. Gandal notes the separation, "[T]he abusive (and self-abusive) man and the degraded (and self-abusive) woman actually get together in the end—something seemingly unthinkable in a trauma film." Fight Club's ending has characteristics of slumming dramas' and trauma films' endings. Like the "wholesome" heroes, the nameless narrator ascends from "bohemian depths", but like in trauma films, the narrator is not "physically unscathed", suffering a gunshot wound through his cheek. Despite the protagonist and the love object uniting, the film remains hostile to sentimentality through the display of the gunshot wound and a spliced frame of a penis, one of Tyler Durden's hostile acts during the film.

== Consumerist culture ==
Cultural critics Henry Giroux and Imre Szeman describe Fight Club as a failed critique which focuses on the consumerist culture and how it shapes male identity and ignores how neoliberal capitalism has dominated and exploited society. They write, "Fight Club has nothing substantive to say about the structural violence of unemployment, job insecurity, cuts in public spending, and the destruction of institutions capable of defending social provisions and the public good." The film is "dangerously seductive" because of how it offers through Project Mayhem "a possible vision of a collective response... however disturbing such a response might be." The vision, in the form of "regressive, vicious, and obscene" politics, is presented as the only possible alternative to defeat contemporary capitalism. Fight Club is a film that "very powerfully reveals the astonishing limits of our political imagination", focusing on masculinity and centering on a "hip, stylishly violent" narrative. The critics write, "It tells us very little... about the real circumstances and causes of our discontent, which lie in a very different place than in the seeming emasculation of that social group that wields perhaps the most concentrated power the world has ever seen—urban, upper-middle class, white, male technocrats."

Giroux and Szeman identify Tyler Durden as a failed icon of the revolution whose public appeal is more due to his cult personality than any "strengths of an articulated, democratic notion of political reform." Durden acts instead of thinking and thereby fails to envision democratic movements; he is described as "a holdover of early-twentieth-century fascism". While the narrator represents the crisis of capitalism as a crisis of masculinity, Tyler Durden represents "redemption of masculinity repackaged as the promise of violence in the interests of social and political anarchy".

In the film, Tyler Durden holds Raymond, a young Asian convenience store clerk, at gunpoint. Durden threatens to kill Raymond unless the clerk returns to veterinary school, a previous pursuit which Raymond had abandoned. The extortion is flawed because Durden treats choice as an individual act that can be willed through, ignoring societal dynamics. The critics write, "For Tyler, success is simply a matter of getting off one's backside and forging ahead; individual initiative and sheer force of will magically cancel out institutional constraints, and critiques of the gravity of dominant relations of oppression are dismissed as either an act of bad faith or the unacceptable whine of victimization."

The two critics outline three main absences in Fight Club's critique. First, the film assumes that capitalism and consumerism are "impenetrable", and there cannot be resistance or struggle against them. Secondly, the film focuses instead on defending "authoritarian masculinity". The fight clubs' violence are complicit with the system of commodification that it denounces because it ties into instant gratification, heightened competitiveness, and "the market-driven desire" to dominate and win in fights. Lastly, Fight Club ascribes to a world under the philosophy of Thomas Hobbes in which cynicism replaces hope. The critics write of this world, "The survival of the fittest becomes the clarion call for legitimating dehumanizing forms of violence as a source of pleasure and sociality." They summarize, "Fight Club appears to have no understanding of its own articulation with the very forces of capitalism it appears to be attacking. This is most evident in its linking of violence, masculinity, and gender. In other words, Fight Club's vision of liberation and politics relies on gendered and sexist hierarchies that flow directly from the consumer culture it claims to be criticizing." Fight Club is a reminder to have discourse about ethics and politics but its failed critique suggests "a more sustained and systemic critique" of societal conditions.

== Fascism ==
Robert von Dassanowsky identifies Fight Club, alongside The Talented Mr. Ripley and Hannibal, as an American film released at the turn of the 21st century that examines European fascism through cinematic metaphor and explores fascism's cultural and sexual politics. Fight Club's portrayal of the paramilitary Project Mayhem represents a response to the feminization of America, and the portrayal is reminiscent of the creation of Nazism in response to the "decadent" Weimar Republic of Germany. In the film, the counter to the feminized male is a model of male that is "an identity-less, violent and destructively nihilistic cadre that intends to discipline a world gone too tolerant". The paramilitary members' processing of human fat from liposuction into designer soap is a Holocaust reference. The process surpasses in potency Soylent Green's premise of processing people into food. Dassanowsky writes, "[It] is not only possible and marketable in the real world, but the very concept of this postmodern self-improvement elitism derives from the most horrific inhumanity in human history."

The film's embodiment of the crisis of masculinity is former bodybuilder Bob Paulson, played by Meat Loaf. As a result of steroid abuse, Bob has lost his testicles, developed "bitch tits", and become estranged from his family. His body and spirit are damaged by failed modernity's science and technology. He embodies how traditional patriarchy is being lost and how his generation fears feminization. Dassanowsky summarizes:

"Without his testicles and with female breasts Bob has become the extreme metaphor for middle-class, male-led panic in the postmodern era, a setting that features a recasting of the same factors of interwar German angst: dehumanization through (post)modernity and its technology: international economic and geopolitical instability; and lack of trust in social and political concepts and/or the national identity and role."

Paulson is killed accidentally while participating in one of Project Mayhem's "urban terrorist" operations. In his death, he becomes "a mythical icon" who receives his name back, having previously gone nameless like other members of the Project. The scenario retells how Nazi activist Horst Wessel's death by communist activists was exploited by the Nazi movement to portray Wessel as a fallen hero. Dassanowsky observes the effect of Bob's death and the response to it, "Mythology and the constructed enemy against which Bob perished in battle obscure the Fight Club's reactionary 'revolution.'"

Another member of Project Mayhem, Angel Face (played by Jared Leto), is disfigured by the narrator in Sadean destruction "of the 'normal' or ideal as sexual act". The disfigurement signifies how "there is no symbolic Other that is victimized or battles fascist oppression". The narrator himself is unable to recognize his actions as Tyler Durden. He attempts to rid himself of Durden, which is metaphoric of "the post-war trauma in dealing with fascist destruction". Fascism arises when humans fear inadequacy and losing social control. Audiences respond eagerly to the film's presentation of fascism, having a base desire "to experience the forbidden, to see the cornerstones of industry dynamited and collapse." Fight Club concludes with the narrator and his female companion watching Project Mayhem's successful detonation of buildings that hold credit card information to reset society's debt. Dassanowsky writes of the conclusion, "The ecstasy of a fresh start that can not be reversed... as the Narrator and [Marla] hold hands while the buildings sink, [is] as potentially wish-fulfilling as any hyperthyroid promise Hitler may have made to a tired and bruised nation in 1933."
