= David Fincher's unrealized projects =

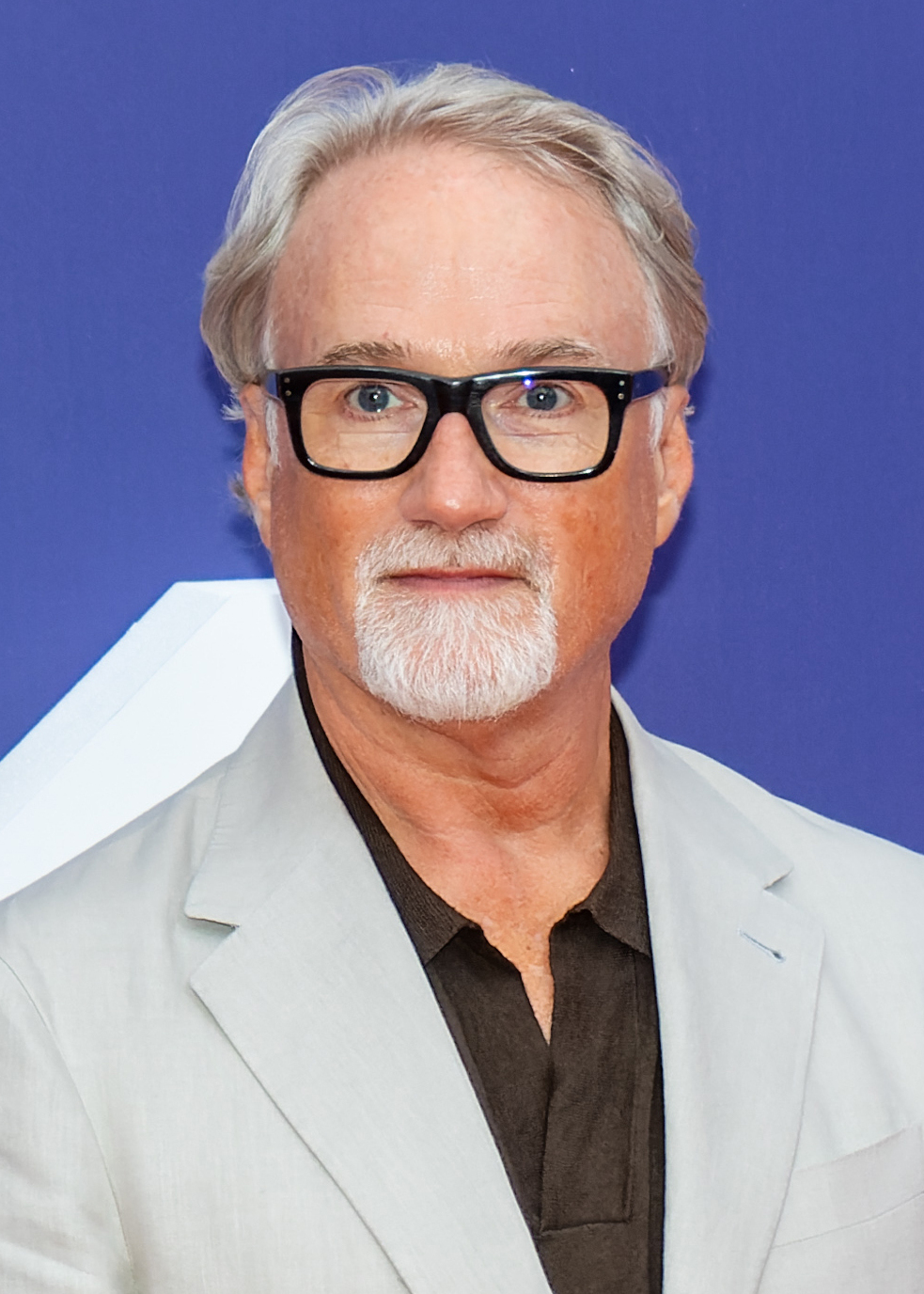
Fincher in 2023

During his career, American film director David Fincher has worked on a number of projects which never progressed beyond the pre-production stage under his direction. Some of these projects fell in development hell, were officially canceled or would see life under a different production team.

== 1980s ==
=== Insomnia ===
In 1988, the Los Angeles Times reported that Fincher would make his big-screen feature directorial debut with Insomnia, the origin story of Robbie Robertson, planned to film in New York City the following year. Steve de Jarnett was attached as scriptwriter and Martin Scorsese was to executive produce alongside Jon Taplan and Nick Wechsler. Then, in the early 1990s, Lawrence Wright came aboard to take a crack at telling the story. According to Robertson's manager, Jared Levine, Wright had written a few drafts, but Scorsese was uncomfortable with the project. "Robbie was like, 'You know what? I need to write the story for this to be done properly'," said Levine. Years later, Insomnia was posthumously published as a memoir by Robertson.

== 1990s ==
=== Love Field ===
In April 1990, the Los Angeles Times reported that Fincher was set to make his feature debut with a film based on the stage play Love Field, about the man who shot Lee Harvey Oswald, later titled Ruby. However, Fincher withdrew from the project and was replaced by Scottish director John Mackenzie.

=== Madonna: Truth or Dare ===
Alek Keshishian revealed in an interview that Fincher had been considered to direct Madonna's music documentary Truth or Dare, having already directed three of her music videos. However, Fincher and Madonna would later have a falling out, and Keshishian was then attached as director.

=== The Avengers ===
After Alien 3, Fincher briefly considered directing the film adaptation based on the British espionage series The Avengers, which he envisioned as "a big, widescreen black-and-white version, kind of cool, a real mod sixties kind of thing". He also apparently wanted to cast Charles Dance as John Steed; however, Ralph Fiennes would ultimately end up playing the part in the eventual film, directed by Jeremiah S. Chechik.

=== GoldenEye ===
Fincher claimed to be in discussions to direct a James Bond film "post-Timothy Dalton"; the first to star Pierce Brosnan, which would eventually become GoldenEye. "Believe me, they didn't want to hear from me. The people that own that franchise have a pretty good idea of what they think it is".

=== Blade ===
In an interview with MovieWeb, David S. Goyer revealed that Fincher was attached to direct the first comic book film adaptation of Blade at one point, and that he even developed the script with Goyer.

=== Fallen Angels (season 2) ===
Just before Seven got greenlit, Fincher had been set to direct an episode of the second season of Showtime's neo-noir anthology series Fallen Angels.

=== The Sky Is Falling ===
In 1995, Fincher was in negotiations with TriStar Pictures to direct The Sky Is Falling from a spec script written by Howard Roth and Eric Warren Singer about two clerics on an archaeological dig who discover proof of God. The film would ultimately fail to obtain a greenlight.

=== The Crowded Room ===
After Seven, Fincher considered directing the long-in-development project The Crowded Room, with Brad Pitt starring in the role of Billy Milligan. The novel on which it was based, The Minds of Billy Milligan, was eventually adapted into a 2023 miniseries.

=== Chicago ===
Fincher was amongst several directors approached throughout the 1990s to direct a film version of Bob Fosse's Broadway musical Chicago, that would eventually be directed by Rob Marshall.

=== Rendezvous with Rama ===
As early as July 1997, Fincher was attached as director for an adaptation of the Arthur C. Clarke book, with Morgan Freeman attached to star. Fincher stated in 2007 that he still planned to direct; but, by 2008, he stated that it was unlikely to be made as no script had been written. Fincher reiterated his desire to still make the film in 2010, but it was still down to the matter of finding the right script. In an interview with Empire, in which Fincher was asked several questions by readers, he referred to the film as "a gigantic, expensive movie that didn't have any toys." In December 2021, it was announced Denis Villeneuve would direct the adaptation for Alcon Entertainment, with Freeman involved as producer.

=== The Night Watchman ===
In November 1997, while waiting for Brad Pitt's commitment to Fight Club, Fincher entered negotiations to direct The Night Watchman from a screenplay by James Ellroy for New Regency and Warner Bros. The film was later made as Street Kings in 2005.

=== The Black Dahlia ===
As early as 1998, Fincher had shown interest in developing James Ellroy's The Black Dahlia as a directing vehicle. Eventually, in the 2000s, he planned to adapt The Black Dahlia into a five-part HBO miniseries budgeted at $80 million that would star Tom Cruise. However, Brian De Palma ultimately directed a film version of the book in 2006. In 2013, a graphic novel adaptation was published with Fincher credited for adapting the story.

=== The Mexican ===
After shooting was completed on Fight Club, Brad Pitt passed the script of The Mexican to Fincher, who wanted to direct the film but was too busy at the time to commit. Gore Verbinski got the job instead.

=== Harry Potter and the Philosopher's Stone ===
In the late 1990s, Fincher pitched a darker, "creepy" vision for the first Harry Potter film installment, likening it to the 1987 film Withnail and I. Warner Bros. rejected it in favor of a more traditional, family-friendly approach; Chris Columbus was thus chosen instead, with the resulting film seeing release in 2001.

=== Spider-Man ===
In November 1999, Fincher was shortlisted by Columbia Pictures, as one of the potential directors of Spider-Man, a live-action adaptation of the Marvel Comics character. Fincher's pitch featured an older, experienced version of the titular character in his adult years and the post-adolescent portion of his life as a photographer and his crime-fighting double life as a vigilante, with a more grounded, character-driven and drama-oriented tone and direction. He also wanted the film to feature a ten-minute title sequence tackling Peter Parker's backstory and featuring Green Goblin killing Gwen Stacy. Fincher later said of his pitch: "I went in and told them what I might be interested in doing, and they hated it". Sam Raimi was chosen as director instead.

== 2000s ==
=== The Hire ===
In the early 2000s, Fincher was approached to direct The Hire, BMW's film showcasing its cars. He ended up not directing, but serving as an executive producer, and deciding the project "would work better as a series of short separate films directed by high profile directors."

=== Passengers ===
In January 2000, Fincher was announced to direct the film Passengers, an adaptation of Robert Silverberg's short story from 1969, for USA Films. Michael London would produce and Greg Pruss, who previously worked with Fincher on Alien 3 as a conceptual artist, was in charge of adapting the story. The budget was set to be no more than $30 million. In 2002, Ain't It Cool News reported that Fincher was no longer directing but would still produce and was scavenging for a replacement.

=== Catch Me If You Can ===
In April 2000, Fincher was attached to direct Catch Me If You Can over the course of a few months, but dropped out in favor of Panic Room.

=== Squids ===
Fincher, along with Art Linson, purchased the script written by David Ayer in April 2000, a coming-of-age story set on a nuclear submarine during the Cold War. The film never developed further, and in 2012, Ayer spoke negatively about the script, stating that it "sucked".

=== Pathfinder ===
In May 2000, Fincher was reportedly attached to direct the action film Pathfinder, written by John Patrick Shanley, about a CIA agent who tries to stop his former cellmate from blowing up stolen plutonium.

=== They Fought Alone ===
Fincher entered discussions to direct the film in August 2000 about Col. Wendell Fertig, a soldier serving in the Philippines during World War II. The screenplay was written by William Nicholson. Fincher reiterated his intent to direct in January 2009, revealing Robert Towne had been brought in to rewrite the screenplay, and Brad Pitt was wanted to portray Fretig.

=== Seared ===
In November 2000, Fincher was set to direct an adaptation of Anthony Bourdain's memoir Kitchen Confidential, which Art Linson would produce, and Brad Pitt reportedly interested to star, as well as Benicio del Toro. The project was set to film once Fincher completed Panic Room. The book would instead be adapted for television as Kitchen Confidential starring Bradley Cooper as fictional version of Bourdain, which aired for one season in 2005, airing just four episodes.

=== Chemical Pink ===
In March 2001, Fincher acquired the rights to Katie Arnoldi's novel that took place in the bodybuilding world, with Art Linson producing and Fight Club novelist Chuck Palahniuk writing the screenplay. Fincher eventually exited the project, with Jonas Åkerlund taking over as director. The project would become dormant.

=== Hard Boiled ===
In August 2001, Fincher was announced as directing an adaptation of Frank Miller's three issue comic book series that would see Nicolas Cage star in the lead role.

=== Confessions of a Dangerous Mind ===
In an interview with BBC, George Clooney revealed that Fincher was one of many directors considered to direct the film.

=== The Lion, the Witch and the Wardrobe ===
In December 2001, Walden Media announced that they had acquired the film rights to all seven of The Chronicles of Narnia children's fantasy novels. Philip Anschutz was soon approached by several filmmaker candidates, including Fincher, who wanted to direct the first film in the series. By March 2002, Andrew Adamson was selected as director of the adaptation.

=== Mission: Impossible III ===
In April 2002, Fincher was sought out by Tom Cruise to serve as director for the third instalment of the Mission: Impossible franchise. Fincher was looking to make the film "really violent". However he would eventually pull out of the film, and said in a 2008 MTV interview: "I think the problem with third movies is the people who are financing them are experts on how they should be made and what they should be. At that point, when you own a franchise like that, you want to get rid of any extraneous opinions. I'm not the kind of person who says, "Let's see the last two, I see what you're going for." You'll never hear me say, "Whatever is easiest for you."

=== The Reincarnation of Peter Proud ===
Fincher was reported to be in negotiations to direct a second adaptation of the 1974 novel for Paramount Pictures in May 2002. He officially became attached to direct in November 2009, with the remake rights now under Columbia Pictures. Andrew Kevin Walker was attached to write the screenplay, reuniting with Fincher for the first time since Seven. A different remake/adaptation was announced in 2021 as the first project under a new deal between Village Roadshow Pictures and David S. Goyer's Phantom Four Films to produce feature films. Sean Durkin is writing and directing the film.

=== Stay ===
Fincher was reported to be directing David Benioff's spec-script in 2002, in a column written about Benioff. The film was eventually directed by Marc Forster and released in 2005.

=== Lords of Dogtown ===
Fincher was hired to replace musician Fred Durst on the skateboarding biopic in January 2003, but exited over budget and philosophical differences with Sony Pictures. Catherine Hardwicke would eventually direct the final product.

=== Deadwood pilot episode ===
According to Fincher, he was "two millimeters from saying yes to directing the pilot" of the HBO Western series Deadwood, having loved David Milch's teleplay. Walter Hill directed the episode instead.

=== The Lookout ===
In August 2003, Fincher was reported to be directing the spec-script written by Scott Frank for DreamWorks Pictures. Fincher helped develop the script with Frank, and his contributions were later featured in the finished film. After Fincher dropped out, DreamWorks also abandoned the film, which was later picked up by Miramax and directed by Frank himself. The film was eventually released in 2007 to positive reviews.

=== The Time Traveler's Wife ===
Around 2004, Fincher had briefly expressed interest in directing the film adaptation of Audrey Niffenegger's The Time Traveler's Wife. As of 2005, Robert Schwentke entered final negotiations to direct it, and the film was released in 2009.

=== The Dirt ===
In the early 2000s, Rich Wilkes wrote the adaptation of the Mötley Crüe biography The Dirt, which Fincher planned to direct, but it "got blown apart somehow," Wilkes later said. Soon afterwards, in 2006, Larry Charles was tapped to direct his script. The film was eventually revived in 2015, and directed by Jeff Tremaine. Fincher would later collaborate with Wilkes when he enlisted him to write the pilot for the ill-fated Videosyncrazy series.

=== Torso ===
Fincher was announced in 2006 to direct the adaptation of the Brian Michael Bendis and Marc Andreyko graphic of the same name about Eliot Ness and his investigation of the Cleveland Torso Murderer. In January 2008, Fincher indicated that it was not going to be a serial-killer film: "It's about the deconstruction of the myth of Eliot Ness. It has way more to do with Citizen Kane than it has to do with Seven". Ehren Kruger wrote the script. In December 2008, Fincher said that it would not be a very faithful adaptation of the comic. A cast of Matt Damon, Rachel McAdams, Casey Affleck and Gary Oldman was rumored to be attached prior to Paramount Pictures allowing the rights to the comic lapse in January 2009.

=== Superfly ===
After directing Zodiac, Fincher read Steven Zaillian's script of American Gangster, then under the title Superfly. Though he wanted to direct it, he felt that the film required a budget close to $100 million, which the studio head disagreed with. The project was instead directed by Ridley Scott, and was ironically produced on that very same budget.

=== Second Lives ===
In 2007, Fincher tapped Peter Straughan to adapt Tim Guest's novel Second Lives into a film screenplay.

=== The Terror ===
David Kajganich's adaptation of the 2007 novel The Terror originated as a screenplay he wrote that was set to be directed by Fincher. Twelve years later, his adaptation was produced as a ten-part series on AMC.

=== Fight Club Broadway musical ===
In January 2008, Fincher stated that for the tenth anniversary of his film Fight Club, he wanted to stage Chuck Palahnuik's story as a musical on Broadway, though this idea never ended up coming to fruition.

=== Lullaby ===
Fincher also expressed interest in adapting Palahnuik's novel Lullaby, but added that it would "almost [have] to be dumbed down a bit for it to work as a movie."

=== Black Hole ===
In February 2008, Fincher was attached to direct Charles Burns's acclaimed graphic novel Black Hole for Plan B Entertainment. He officially dropped out in 2010 in order to direct The Girl with the Dragon Tattoo, although he was briefly reported to return in 2013. In 2018, it was reported that Rick Famuyiwa would direct the film, with New Regency financing.

=== Heavy Metal ===
In March 2008, it was announced Fincher was to produce a remake of the 1981 film, itself based on the Heavy Metal magazine. It was planned to feature eight or nine segments, with Fincher, James Cameron, Zack Snyder, Kevin Eastman, Tim Miller and Mark Osborne directing segments, and Guillermo del Toro and Gore Verbinski reported as expressing interest in taking part as well. Tenacious D had written a song for the film, with Jack Black also set to appear in Osborne's segment.

The project was initially at Paramount Pictures, but was dropped by the studio in 2008. Eventually, Robert Rodriguez acquired the film rights to Heavy Metal, effectively cancelling Fincher's version.

=== The Automatic Detective ===
Fincher acquired the rights to the A. Lee Martinez novel in July 2008, planning to make the film with Blur Studio.

=== The Devil in the White City ===
On December 8, 2008, screenwriter Eric Roth reported that Fincher expressed interest in directing his screenplay adaptation of Erik Larson's The Devil in the White City, set in the World Columbian Exposition in 1893.

=== Chef ===
Fincher discussed on December 19, 2008, a project he was looking to do set within the culinary arts world that would star Keanu Reeves. In 2010, the project was considered "dead". The film would eventually be released in 2015 as Burnt, directed by John Wells and starring Bradley Cooper.

=== Terriers pilot episode ===
According to Terriers writer Shawn Ryan, he had met with Fincher soon after the release of The Curious Case of Benjamin Button about him directing the show's pilot episode. Though Fincher was very enthusiastic about taking the job, he had just received the script for The Social Network, and decided to direct that next.

=== Columbine ===
Following the 2009 publication of Dave Cullen's book Columbine, which was eventually adapted into a play in 2014, Fincher considered making it into a film, however, the idea was dropped due to its sensitive nature.

== 2010s ==
=== Lone Wolf and Cub film trilogy ===
In the 2010s, Fincher, Tim Miller and Andrew Kevin Walker were developing a big-budget film based on the Japanese manga series Lone Wolf and Cub, which they pitched as a film trilogy to Universal Pictures. According to Miller, Fincher planned to shoot it photo realistically, using CGI, in order to recreate medieval Japan, but Universal failed to clear the rights to the story, so Fincher moved onto other projects. Justin Lin later became attached as director, and in 2017, the project was revived by Paramount Pictures.

=== Nerdland ===
Fincher was the first involved to direct Andrew Kevin Walker's comedy script Nerdland, which they had initially planned to do as a live action film, financed independently. Several actors came in to do read-throughs of the script including Zach Galifianakis, Bob Odenkirk and John Ennis. Fincher would move on to other projects and Walker's script was eventually made into the 2016 animated film.

=== Pawn Sacrifice ===
In March 2010, Fincher was reported to be directing Pawn Sacrifice. However, Fincher later claimed that he did not officially sign on, although he did have meetings with the filmmakers.

=== 20,000 Leagues Under the Sea ===
It was announced by Fincher in July 2010 that he was to direct a remake of the 1954 Disney film, with Scott Z. Burns writing the screenplay. Filming was initially planned to begin in late 2012, with Brad Pitt eyed to star. Pitt would decline the role, however. The production received a $20 million incentive to film in Australia, but Fincher would exit the project in July 2013, citing casting disagreements with Disney, as he wanted to cast Channing Tatum for the lead role, but Disney wanted Chris Hemsworth.

=== Cleopatra ===
Fincher became attached to a new telling of the story of Cleopatra starring Angelina Jolie in March 2011. Fincher confirmed his involvement later that year, stating Eric Roth was working on the screenplay and that he wasn't looking to make it in a typical sword-and-sandal style. He left the project in August 2012.

=== The Girl Who Played with Fire ===
Upon the December 2011 release of The Girl with the Dragon Tattoo, the American adaptation of the Stieg Larsson novel, Fincher revealed the plan was to make the sequels The Girl Who Played with Fire and The Girl Who Kicked the Hornets' Nest, "back to back." The script for Who Played with Fire was revised by Steven Zaillian and Andrew Kevin Walker at various stages. Upon the release of The Girl in the Spider's Web by David Lagercrantz, Sony Pictures elected to reboot the series instead with an adaptation of the new novel. It was released in 2018, directed by Fede Álvarez and starring Claire Foy. Fincher served as an executive producer.

=== Untitled Queen biopic ===
As early as 2010, a Queen biopic had been in active development with Sacha Baron Cohen set to portray lead singer Freddie Mercury, and Peter Morgan writing the script. At this time, Fincher, and several others including Tom Hooper and Stephen Frears, circled the Queen biopic as a potential project. Impressed with test photos of Cohen in character as Mercury, Fincher campaigned himself to direct the film but was rejected by the band. By 2013, Cohen had officially exited the biopic over creative differences with one of the members, and Rami Malek would instead go on to play Mercury in the 2018 film, Bohemian Rhapsody.

=== Star Wars sequel trilogy ===
In November 2012, it was reported that Fincher was considered as one of the many possible directors for the first film of the Star Wars sequel trilogy. In September 2014, Fincher revealed that he had discussed it with Kathleen Kennedy and that his idea was to make it like The Empire Strikes Back, and that he saw the series as "the story of two slaves [C-3PO and R2-D2] who go from owner to owner, witnessing their masters' folly, the ultimate folly of man." In a later interview with Empire, Fincher stated that he turned it down because he was not interested in "franchise filmmaking" due to the pressure of it all.

=== Videosyncrazy ===
In June 2015, HBO shut down production on Videosyncrazy, a half-hour comedy series after it had filmed 4-5 episodes, with Fincher directing multiple episodes. It starred Charlie Rowe, Sam Page, Jason Flemyng, Kerry Condon, Elizabeth Lail, Corbin Bernsen and Paz Vega and was set in 1983, following a college dropout who moves to Hollywood with dreams of making a sci-fi epic, but ends up working on music videos. The first season was to begin with the making of the video for Berlin's song "The Metro" and would have concluded with the filming of Michael Jackson's Thriller. The series was written by Rich Wilkes and Bob Stephenson. Wilkes described it as "a half-hour show in the vein of something like Entourage or Veep."

=== Utopia ===
Fincher became interested in making an American remake of the British television series Utopia in July 2013. By February 2014, he teamed with author Gillian Flynn and began developing the series at HBO, which gave it a series order. Fincher was set to direct all the episodes of the show's first season, with Flynn writing. The series would have starred Rooney Mara, Colm Feore, Eric McCormack, Dallas Roberts, Jason Ritter, Brandon Scott, and Agyness Deyn. HBO cancelled the project in August 2015, due to budget issues. Fincher stated in an October 2017 interview that it was specifically a disagreement over $9 million. The series was picked up by Amazon Studios in 2018, with Flynn remaining on board as creator, executive producer and showrunner. Along with Videosyncrazy and Utopia, the third series in the HBO deal, Shakedown a 50s-set noir series, was also halted.

=== Steve Jobs ===
Fincher entered early talks to direct a biopic about Apple co-founder Steve Jobs in February 2014. However he would bow out in April over contractual disputes, and would later be replaced by Danny Boyle.

=== Red Sparrow ===
In June 2014, it was reported that Fincher was interested in directing Eric Warren Singer's screenplay adaptation of Jason Matthews' espionage novel, Red Sparrow over at Fox, and wanted to re-team with actress Rooney Mara for the lead role. For the final film, Justin Haythe's script was used, Francis Lawrence would direct and Jennifer Lawrence would star.

=== Shakedown ===
Announced in December 2014, Shakedown was to be an HBO series directed by Fincher and written by James Ellroy. It was to be set in the seedy tabloid world of 1950s Los Angeles, and was inspired by the life of private investigator and Hollywood "fixer" Fred Otash. It was reported to be an original series written by Ellroy, and not an adaptation of his 2012 short story of the same name, also about Otash.

=== Strangers ===
It was reported in January 2015 that Fincher was to re-team with Gone Girl actor Ben Affleck and screenwriter Gillian Flynn on a modern updating of Alfred Hitchcock's Strangers on a Train, entitled Strangers, for Warner Bros. In a July interview, Flynn remarked that all three individuals were "overcommitted" at the time. In 2024, the project was said to have briefly resurfaced, with both Affleck and Brad Pitt on board to star, before Fincher scrapped it in favor of remaking Hitchcock's Rope instead.

=== World War Z 2 ===
Fincher was hired to direct the sequel to 2013's World War Z in June 2017, with filming set to begin in June 2019. Paramount Pictures cancelled the project in February 2019. A cited reason for the cancellation was China imposing a ban on films featuring zombies and ghosts. By September 2026, the film re-entered development with Edward Berger replacing Fincher as director.

=== Untitled Chinatown prequel series ===
In November 2019, it was announced that Netflix had closed a deal with Fincher and Robert Towne to develop the pilot script for a series prequel to Chinatown, focusing on a younger version of the J. J. Gittes character. Fincher was to serve as showrunner, and executive produce alongside Joshua Donen. Fincher confirmed he was still attached to it as of 2021, and, in 2023, rumors circulated that Henry Cavill had signed on for a role in the series. By 2024, Towne confirmed that the script for each episode had been completed. According to The Playlist, Fincher eyed and wanted Tom Pelphrey to play the young Gittes.

== 2020s ==
=== The Social Network sequel ===
In 2020, a decade after The Social Network's release, its writer Aaron Sorkin announced that he would only write the sequel's script if Fincher returned as director. In 2023, Fincher told The Guardian that he and Sorkin have discussed a sequel, but said "that's a can of worms." By June 2025, Sorkin would instead direct, as well as write, the sequel, titled The Social Reckoning.

=== Heckler ===
As early as 2023, Fincher was being courted to direct Netflix's proposed American, English-language version of the Korean-language thriller series Squid Game, according to journalist Jeff Sneider. By June the following year, Dennis Kelly was hired as writer of the adaptation. That September, it was officially confirmed by Deadline Hollywood that the series would be going forward as Fincher's next project. In June 2025, principal photography was tentatively set to commence in Los Angeles that December. Additionally, Variety referred to the project as Squid Game: America. In August, Pom Klementieff was eyed to star in the series. There was speculation that Cate Blanchett would be reprising her role from the finale of the third season as the Recruiter of the games in the United States; which was later confirmed in November. It was officially greenlit with Fincher producing alongside original showrunner Hwang Dong-hyuk, Kim Ji-yeon, Zeus Zamani and Rhett Giles, with filming then scheduled for February 26, 2026. By August 2026, sources close to Fincher told The Playlist that Netflix was no longer moving forward with the project, which had the working title Heckler, citing a shift in priorities as well as Fincher's own preoccupation with other projects such as The Further Mis-Adventures of Cliff Booth. Though conceived as an American version of Squid Game, production had later been expected to take place in the UK.

=== Bitterroot ===
In September 2024, it was reported that Fincher became attached to direct Bitterroot, a Western crime thriller for Netflix. Its premise follows an elderly rancher who becomes the victim of financial fraud after winning a million-dollar sweepstakes and turns to robbing banks and hunting down the thieves while being pursued by his son, the sheriff. The screenplay written by Michael Gilio originally appeared on The Black List in 2008 under the title Big Hole. Production was scheduled to begin in January 2025 in Los Angeles, before it was put on hold for The Further Mis-Adventures of Cliff Booth.

=== Rope ===
Also in September 2024, it was reported that in addition to Bitterroot, Fincher was actively working on three other projects for Netflix, including the Chinatown prequel series, the Squid Game spinoff and an as-yet revealed crime thriller film. The thriller was then confirmed as a remake of the 1948 Alfred Hitchcock film Rope. Steven Knight was said to have written a draft of the script and Charlize Theron was to star in one of the lead roles. Denzel Washington was also potentially attached to the film. Later that same month however, Jeff Sneider reported that another Rope remake was in the works, with director Morten Tyldum.

=== Untitled Star Wars film ===
Journalist Jeff Sneider reported in 2025 that Fincher had pitched a Star Wars film set after the events of The Rise of Skywalker that centered on a pre-existing character. The project did not enter production due to Lucasfilm refusing to grant Fincher final cut privilege. The Playlist later clarified that it would have been set between the events of The Last Jedi and The Rise of Skywalker, and that his pitch didn't progress beyond "a few phone calls".

== See also ==
- David Fincher filmography
