= List of accolades received by Gone Girl (film) =

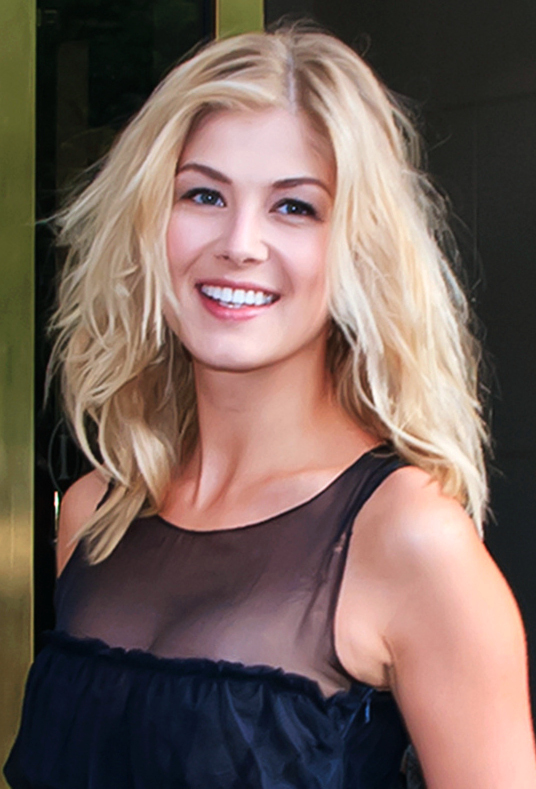
- Rosamund Pike received many awards and nominations for her performance in the film
Accolades
Award	Won	Nominated
AACTA International Awards	0	1
Academy Awards	0	1
African-American Film Critics Association	1	1
Alliance of Women Film Journalists	2	4
American Cinema Editors	0	1
Art Directors Guild	0	1
Austin Film Critics Association	2	2
British Academy Film Awards	0	2
Casting Society of America	0	1
Chicago Film Critics Association	1	4
Costume Designers Guild	0	1
Critics' Choice Movie Awards	1	6
Dallas–Fort Worth Film Critics Association	0	2
Detroit Film Critics Society	1	1
Dublin Film Critics' Circle	0	1
Empire Awards	1	3
Florida Film Critics Circle	2	3
Golden Globe Awards	0	4
Grammy Awards	0	1
Golden Raspberry Awards	1	1
Hollywood Film Awards	3	3
London Film Critics Circle	1	1
Make-Up Artists & Hair Stylists Guild	0	1
Motion Picture Sound Editors	0	1
MTV Movie Awards	0	4
National Board of Review	1	1
Online Film Critics Society	2	3
Palm Springs International Film Festival	1	1
Producers Guild of America Awards	0	1
San Diego Film Critics Society	1	8
San Francisco Film Critics Circle	0	1
Santa Barbara International Film Festival	1	1
Satellite Awards	0	7
Saturn Awards	2	2
Screen Actors Guild Awards	0	1
St. Louis Film Critics Association	2	8
USC Scripter Award	0	1
Washington D.C. Area Film Critics Association	1	6
Writers Guild of America Awards	0	1
- Total number of awards and nominations
Totals	27	93
- References

Gone Girl is a 2014 psychological thriller film directed by David Fincher, and produced by Leslie Dixon, Bruna Papandrea, Arnon Milchan, Reese Witherspoon, Ceán Chaffin, and Joshua Donen. The screenplay was adapted by Gillian Flynn from her eponymous 2012 novel. Set in Missouri, United States, the film stars Ben Affleck as Nick Dunne, a writer who becomes the prime suspect in the mysterious disappearance of his wife Amy, played by Rosamund Pike. Neil Patrick Harris and Tyler Perry feature in supporting roles. The score was composed by Trent Reznor and Atticus Ross.

Gone Girl premiered at the New York Film Festival on September 26, 2014, before 20th Century Fox gave the film a wide release at over 3,000 theaters in the United States and Canada on October 3. It grossed over $368 million on a production budget of $61 million. As of November 2017, Gone Girl is Fincher's highest-grossing film. Rotten Tomatoes, a review aggregator, surveyed 348 reviews and judged 87% to be positive.

Gone Girl garnered awards and nominations in a variety of categories with particular praise for its direction, Pike's lead acting performance, Flynn's screenplay, and its score. At the 87th Academy Awards, Pike received a nomination for Best Actress. The film received four nominations at the 72nd Golden Globe Awards: Best Director for Fincher, Best Actress in a Drama for Pike, Best Screenplay for Flynn, and Best Original Score. Pike won the Empire Award for Best Actress, and garnered nominations in the same category at the 21st Screen Actors Guild Awards and 68th British Academy Film Awards (BAFTAs). She also received the Breakthrough Performance Award from the Palm Springs International Film Festival. Flynn was nominated at the BAFTAs, as well as the Writers Guild of America Awards. The National Board of Review included the film in their list of top ten films of the year.

== Accolades ==
Award	Date of ceremony	Category	Recipient(s)	Result	Ref.
AACTA International Awards	January 31, 2015	Best Actress	Rosamund Pike	Nominated	
Academy Awards	February 22, 2015	Best Actress	Rosamund Pike	Nominated	
African-American Film Critics Association	February 4, 2015	Best Supporting Actor	Tyler Perry (shared with J. K. Simmons for Whiplash)	Won	
Alliance of Women Film Journalists	January 12, 2015	Best Actress	Rosamund Pike	Nominated	
Alliance of Women Film Journalists	January 12, 2015	Best Adapted Screenplay	Gillian Flynn	Won	
Alliance of Women Film Journalists	January 12, 2015	Best Original Score	Trent Reznor and Atticus Ross	Nominated	
Alliance of Women Film Journalists	January 12, 2015	Best Woman Screenwriter	Gillian Flynn	Won	
American Cinema Editors	January 30, 2015	Best Edited Feature Film – Dramatic	Kirk Baxter	Nominated	
Art Directors Guild	January 31, 2015	Excellence in Production Design for a Contemporary Film	Donald Graham Burt	Nominated	
Austin Film Critics Association	December 17, 2014	Best Actress	Rosamund Pike	Won	
Austin Film Critics Association	December 17, 2014	Best Adapted Screenplay	Gillian Flynn	Won	
British Academy Film Awards	February 8, 2015	Best Adapted Screenplay	Gillian Flynn	Nominated	
British Academy Film Awards	February 8, 2015	Best Actress in a Leading Role	Rosamund Pike	Nominated	
Casting Society of America	January 22, 2015	Big Budget Drama	Laray Mayfield, Annie Hamilton	Nominated	
Chicago Film Critics Association	December 15, 2014	Best Director	David Fincher	Nominated	
Chicago Film Critics Association	December 15, 2014	Best Actress	Rosamund Pike	Nominated	
Chicago Film Critics Association	December 15, 2014	Best Adapted Screenplay	Gillian Flynn	Won	
Chicago Film Critics Association	December 15, 2014	Best Editing	Kirk Baxter	Nominated	
Costume Designers Guild	February 17, 2015	Excellence in Contemporary Film	Trish Summerville	Nominated	
Critics' Choice Movie Awards	January 15, 2015	Best Picture	Gone Girl	Nominated	
Critics' Choice Movie Awards	January 15, 2015	Best Director	David Fincher	Nominated	
Critics' Choice Movie Awards	January 15, 2015	Best Actress	Rosamund Pike	Nominated	
Critics' Choice Movie Awards	January 15, 2015	Best Adapted Screenplay	Gillian Flynn	Won	
Critics' Choice Movie Awards	January 15, 2015	Best Editing	Kirk Baxter	Nominated	
Critics' Choice Movie Awards	January 15, 2015	Best Composer	Trent Reznor and Atticus Ross	Nominated	
Dallas–Fort Worth Film Critics Association	December 15, 2014	Best Director	David Fincher	4th place	
Dallas–Fort Worth Film Critics Association	December 15, 2014	Best Actress	Rosamund Pike	3rd place	
Detroit Film Critics Society	December 15, 2014	Best Actress	Rosamund Pike	Won	
Dublin Film Critics' Circle	December 17, 2014	Best Actress	Rosamund Pike	6th place	
Empire Awards	March 29, 2015	Best Actress	Rosamund Pike	Won	
Empire Awards	March 29, 2015	Best Female Newcomer	Carrie Coon	Nominated	
Empire Awards	March 29, 2015	Best Thriller	Gone Girl	Nominated	
Florida Film Critics Circle	December 19, 2014	Best Actress	Rosamund Pike	Won	
Florida Film Critics Circle	December 19, 2014	Best Adapted Screenplay	Gillian Flynn	Won	
Florida Film Critics Circle	December 19, 2014	Best Score	Trent Reznor and Atticus Ross	Runner-up	
Golden Globe Awards	January 11, 2015	Best Director	David Fincher	Nominated	
Golden Globe Awards	January 11, 2015	Best Actress in a Motion Picture – Drama	Rosamund Pike	Nominated	
Golden Globe Awards	January 11, 2015	Best Screenplay	Gillian Flynn	Nominated	
Golden Globe Awards	January 11, 2015	Best Score	Trent Reznor and Atticus Ross	Nominated	
Grammy Awards	February 8, 2015	Best Score Soundtrack for Visual Media	Trent Reznor and Atticus Ross	Nominated	
Golden Raspberry Awards	February 21, 2015	Razzie Redeemer Award	Ben Affleck	Won	
Hollywood Film Awards	November 14, 2014	Best Film	Gone Girl	Won	
Hollywood Film Awards	November 14, 2014	Screenwriter Award	Gillian Flynn	Won	
Hollywood Film Awards	November 14, 2014	Best Sound	Ren Klyce	Won	
London Film Critics' Circle	January 18, 2015	British Actress of the Year	Rosamund Pike	Won	
Make-Up Artists & Hair Stylists Guild	February 14, 2015	Best Contemporary Make-Up	Kate Biscoe, Gigi Williams	Nominated	
Motion Picture Sound Editors	February 15, 2015	Feature Music	Ren Klyce, Jonathon Stevens	Nominated	
MTV Movie Awards	April 12, 2015	Movie of the Year	Gone Girl	Nominated	
MTV Movie Awards	April 12, 2015	Breakthrough Performance	Rosamund Pike	Nominated	
MTV Movie Awards	April 12, 2015	Best Scared-As-S**t Performance	Rosamund Pike	Nominated	
MTV Movie Awards	April 12, 2015	Best Villain	Rosamund Pike	Nominated	
National Board of Review	December 2, 2014	Top Ten Films of Year	Gone Girl	Won	
Online Film Critics Society	December 15, 2014	Best Actress	Rosamund Pike	Won	
Online Film Critics Society	December 15, 2014	Best Adapted Screenplay	Gillian Flynn	Won	
Online Film Critics Society	December 15, 2014	Best Editing	Kirk Baxter	Nominated	
Palm Springs International Film Festival	January 3, 2015	Breakthrough Performance Award	Rosamund Pike	Won	
Producers Guild of America	January 24, 2015	Best Theatrical Motion Picture	Ceán Chaffin	Nominated	
San Diego Film Critics Society	December 15, 2014	Best Film	Gone Girl	Nominated	
San Diego Film Critics Society	December 15, 2014	Best Director	David Fincher	Nominated	
San Diego Film Critics Society	December 15, 2014	Best Actress	Rosamund Pike	Nominated	
San Diego Film Critics Society	December 15, 2014	Best Supporting Actress	Carrie Coon	Nominated	
San Diego Film Critics Society	December 15, 2014	Best Adapted Screenplay	Gillian Flynn	Won	
San Diego Film Critics Society	December 15, 2014	Best Cinematography	Jeff Cronenweth	Nominated	
San Diego Film Critics Society	December 15, 2014	Best Editing	Kirk Baxter	Nominated	
San Diego Film Critics Society	December 15, 2014	Best Score	Trent Reznor and Atticus Ross	Nominated	
San Francisco Film Critics Circle	December 14, 2014	Best Adapted Screenplay	Gillian Flynn	Nominated	
Santa Barbara International Film Festival	February 1, 2015	Virtuosos Award	Rosamund Pike	Won	
Satellite Awards	February 15, 2015	Best Film	Gone Girl	Nominated	
Satellite Awards	February 15, 2015	Best Director	David Fincher	Nominated	
Satellite Awards	February 15, 2015	Best Actress	Rosamund Pike	Nominated	
Satellite Awards	February 15, 2015	Best Adapted Screenplay	Gillian Flynn	Nominated	
Satellite Awards	February 15, 2015	Best Cinematography	Jeff Cronenweth	Nominated	
Satellite Awards	February 15, 2015	Best Original Score	Trent Reznor and Atticus Ross	Nominated	
Satellite Awards	February 15, 2015	Best Sound	Ren Klyce and Steve Cantamessa	Nominated	
Saturn Awards	June 25, 2015	Best Thriller Film	Gone Girl	Won	
Saturn Awards	June 25, 2015	Best Actress	Rosamund Pike	Won	
Screen Actors Guild Awards	January 25, 2015	Outstanding Performance by a Female Actor in a Leading Role	Rosamund Pike	Nominated	
St. Louis Film Critics Association	December 15, 2014	Best Film	Gone Girl	Nominated	
St. Louis Film Critics Association	December 15, 2014	Best Director	David Fincher	Nominated	
St. Louis Film Critics Association	December 15, 2014	Best Actress	Rosamund Pike	Won	
St. Louis Film Critics Association	December 15, 2014	Best Supporting Actress	Carrie Coon	Nominated	
St. Louis Film Critics Association	December 15, 2014	Best Adapted Screenplay	Gillian Flynn	Won	
St. Louis Film Critics Association	December 15, 2014	Best Art Direction	Dawn Swiderski	Nominated	
St. Louis Film Critics Association	December 15, 2014	Best Cinematography	Jeff Cronenweth	Nominated	
St. Louis Film Critics Association	December 15, 2014	Best Score	Trent Reznor and Atticus Ross	Nominated	
USC Scripter Award	January 31, 2015	Best Adapted Screenplay	Gillian Flynn	Nominated	
Washington D.C. Area Film Critics Association	December 8, 2014	Best Film	Gone Girl	Nominated	
Washington D.C. Area Film Critics Association	December 8, 2014	Best Director	David Fincher	Nominated	
Washington D.C. Area Film Critics Association	December 8, 2014	Best Actress	Rosamund Pike	Nominated	
Washington D.C. Area Film Critics Association	December 8, 2014	Best Adapted Screenplay	Gillian Flynn	Won	
Washington D.C. Area Film Critics Association	December 8, 2014	Best Editing	Kirk Baxter	Nominated	
Washington D.C. Area Film Critics Association	December 8, 2014	Original Score	Trent Reznor and Atticus Ross	Nominated	
Writers Guild of America Awards	February 14, 2015	Best Adapted Screenplay	Gillian Flynn	Nominated	

== See also ==
- 2014 in film
