= Policy (Martha Davis album) =

Studio album by Martha Davis
- Released: November 1987
- Studios: The Enterprise (Burbank, California); One On One Studios (North Hollywood, California)
- Genre: New wave
- Length: 43:40
- Label: Capitol
- Producer: Richie Zito

Martha Davis chronology
Policy (1987)	...So the Story Goes (2004)

Professional ratings
Review scores
Source	Rating
AllMusic	4/5 stars

Policy is the first solo studio album by Martha Davis, who is better known as the lead singer for the band the Motels. Martha broke up with her band in February 1987, declaring that she was going solo, and by November, she had released her first solo album.

== Track listing ==
Songs written by Martha Davis except where indicated.

1. "Tell It to the Moon" (Diane Warren) – 4:16
2. "Just Like You" (Davis, John Dexter) – 4:11
3. "Heaven Outside My Door" – 4:03
4. "Don't Tell Me the Time" – 3:34
5. "Rebecca" – 3:22
6. "What Money Might Buy" – 3:32
7. "Don't Ask Out Loud" (Davis, Roger Bruno, Ellen Schwartz) – 4:24
8. "The Hardest Part of a Broken Heart" – 4:03
9. "Lust" (Davis, David Batteau) – 3:59
10. "My Promise" (Davis, Batteau, Bruce Gaitsch) – 3:52
11. "Bridge of Sighs" (Davis, Sue Shifrin) – 3:52

== Singles ==
- "Don't Tell Me the Time" (Capitol Records #44057) Released: Nov 1987 Charts: Australia #8 / US #80
- "Tell It to the Moon" (Capitol Records #44114) Released: Jan 1988 Charts: Australia #65
- "Just Like You" (Capitol Records #79188) Released: Mar 1988 Charts: US-FM #15
- "Don't Ask Out Loud" (Capitol Records #79188) Released: Mar 1988 Charts: Australia #90
- "What Money Might Buy" (Capitol Records AU:#CP 2157) Released: Apr 1988 (Australia only)

== Personnel ==
Credits are adapted from the Policy CD liner notes.

- Martha Davis – vocals, backing vocals (9), arrangements
- Mark Binder – Synclavier programming
- Todd Yvega – Synclavier programming
- Gary Chang – synthesizers, acoustic piano solo (8), arrangements
- Richie Zito – guitars (1–7, 11), additional keyboards (2, 3, 8, 9), bongos (4), lead guitar (9), arrangements
- Steve Farris – guitar solo (1)
- Charlie Sexton – guitar solo (6)
- Bruce Gaitsch – rhythm guitar (9), synthesizers (10), guitars (10)
- Randy Jackson – bass (1, 2, 4, 6–9, 11)
- Michael Goodroe – bass (3, 5, 10)
- Mike Baird – drums (1, 2, 4–6, 11)
- Vinnie Colaiuta – drums (3, 7–9)
- Paulinho da Costa – percussion (3, 7, 9)
- Clarence Clemons – saxophone (2)
- Kenny G – saxophone (7, 11)
- Kipp Lennon – backing vocals (1, 2, 4, 11)
- Joe Pizzulo – backing vocals (1, 2, 4, 11)
- Gary Falcone – backing vocals (1, 4, 11)
- Carmen Twillie – backing vocals (1, 7, 8)
- The Gang Bang Gang Ltd. – backing vocals (6)
- Marlena Jeter – backing vocals (7, 9)
- Phyllis St. James – backing vocals (7)
- Julia Waters Tillman – backing vocals (8)
- Maxine Waters Willard – backing vocals (8)
- David Batteau – backing vocals (9)
- Timothy B. Schmit – backing vocals (10)

Choir on "Heaven Outside My Door"

- Jim Gilstrap
- Phillip Ingram
- Marlena Jeter
- Darryl Phinnessee
- Joe Pizzulo (also vocal arrangements)
- Phyllis St. James
- Carmen Twillie
- Julia Waters Tillman
- Maxine Waters Willard
- Oren Waters

== Production ==
- Richie Zito – producer
- Phil Kaffel – engineer
- David Leonard – mixing
- Bernard Frings – second engineer
- Lori Fumar – second engineer
- Stephen Marcussen – mastering at Precision Lacquer (Hollywood, California)
- Rich Modica – guitar technician
- Katy Parks – production coordinator
- Phillip Dixon – photography
- Norman Moore – art direction, design

== Charts ==
Chart (1987)	Peak position
Australia (Kent Music Report)	28
US Top Pop Albums (Billboard)	127
US AOR Albums (Radio & Records)	33
