= Don't Tell Me the Time =

1987 single by Martha Davis

Single by Martha Davis

from the album Policy
- B-side: "Lust"
- Released: 1987
- Length: 3:33
- Label: Capitol
- Songwriter: Martha Davis
- Producer: Richie Zito

Martha Davis singles chronology
"We've Never Danced" (1987)	"Don't Tell Me the Time" (1987)	"Tell It to the Moon" (1988)

"Don't Tell Me the Time" is a song by American singer-songwriter Martha Davis, which was released in 1987 as the lead single from her debut solo studio album Policy. The song was written by Davis and produced by Richie Zito. "Don't Tell Me the Time" peaked at number 80 on the US Billboard Hot 100 and number 8 on the Australian Kent Music Report chart.

== Background ==
Speaking of the song's message, Davis commented in 1987, "I think everyone has been there at some point or other, even if it's only in our imaginations where you're in a situation where you're feeling like you've been done wrong. I have a thing about jealousy; I'm not really a jealous person by nature, but what I can't stand is like if somebody thinks I'm stupid enough not to figure something out. It's the anger, the frustration, the sadness and just all the emotions that go along with feeling like you've been done wrong. It's not directly related to any particular incident I can cite. It has happened to me, I think it's happened to a lot of people."

== Music video ==
The song's music video was directed by David Fincher and produced Kim Dempster for Propaganda Films. It achieved breakout rotation on MTV and medium rotation on VH1.

== Critical reception ==
On its release, Billboard described "Don't Tell Me the Time" as an "aching piece of neo-'60s pop" which is "adorned with Davis' distinctive and emotion-laden vocal". They concluded that the track has "quite an impact". Cash Box praised it as an "impressive pop outing" and added that it "should cause quite a stir". The Gavin Report felt Davis "is sure to book plenty of airplay in A/C radio with this one". They added, "It's a song about time and temperature where the moment has passed and there's a chill in the air."

== Track listing ==
7–inch single (US, Canada, France, Netherlands and Australasia)

1. "Don't Tell Me the Time" – 3:33
2. "Lust" – 3:56

7–inch single (South Africa)

1. "Don't Tell Me the Time" – 3:33
2. "Rebecca" – 3:23

7–inch promotional single (US)

1. "Don't Tell Me the Time" – 3:33
2. "Don't Tell Me the Time" – 3:33

12–inch promotional single (France)

1. "Don't Tell Me the Time" – 3:33
2. "Lust" – 3:56

== Personnel ==
Credits are adapted from the Policy CD liner notes.

"Don't Tell Me the Time"

- Martha Davis – vocals
- Gary Falcone, Kipp Lennon, Joe Pizzulo – backing vocals
- Richie Zito – guitars, bongos
- Gary Chang – synthesizers
- Randy Jackson – bass
- Michael Baird – drums

Production

- Richie Zito – producer
- Phil Kaffel – engineer
- David Leonard – mixing
- Stephen Marcussen – mastering

== Charts ==
Chart (1987–1988)	Peak position
Australia (Music Report)	8
US Billboard Hot 100	80
