= Katie Arnoldi =

American novelist

- Born: February 24, 1959 (age 67); Los Angeles, California, U.S.
- Occupation: Novelist
- Writing career
- Genre: Literary fiction
- Notable works: Point Dume, The Wentworths, Chemical Pink
- Website: katiearnoldi.com

Katie Arnoldi (born February 24, 1959) is an American mainstream fiction writer and former bodybuilder. She has published three novels, Chemical Pink (Bloomsbury, 2001), The Wentworths (Overlook, 2008), and Point Dume (Overlook, 2010). Arnoldi lives in Southern California with her husband, the painter Charles Arnoldi, and their two children.

== Novels ==
- Chemical Pink (2001)
- The Wentworths (2008)
- Point Dume (2010)
- Rose chimique roman

== Point Dume ==
Part comedy of manners and part cautionary tale, Point Dume (named after the stunning coastal promontory in Malibu) tells the interlocking stories of disparate characters all bound by their connection to the land by the sea. There's Frank Bain, the nouveau-riche surfer with a giant vineyard that's blighting the landscape and an unhealthy attachment to his mistress, Ellis, the old-line Malibu free spirit who's caught between Frank and a drifter named Pablo Schwartz. "Ellis came from the service side of the counter," Arnoldi writes, "and Frank expected to be waited on."

Set in Mexico and Malibu, Point Dume explores the death of surf culture, the destruction of public land by cartel marijuana growers using pesticides and rodenticides, native and invasive species, and obsessive love.

== The Wentworths ==
Seven years after publishing Chemical Pink, Arnoldi paints a searing portrait of wealthy Westside Los Angeles life, dramatizing the dysfunctionality of the modern American family, while examining how it actually is that people get so screwed up.

“Using multiple points of view, Arnoldi tackles the story of the Wentworth clan, each and every member of which is quickly unraveling. While tales of dysfunctional families abound, this one separates itself from the pack with concise prose, escalating tension, and wry humor.”

== Chemical Pink ==
Set in the world of female bodybuilding, Chemical Pink is a story of obsession and the consequences of going too far to achieve your goals.

Amateur bodybuilder Aurora Johnson is vacationing in sunny California. While working out at the gym, she meets Charles Worthington, a wealthy eccentric with a passion for up-and-coming bodybuilders, a passion that surpasses the sport and veers towards the kinky. Aurora, thrilled to have found a “sponsor,” willingly surrenders her life to Charles. Under his tutelage, she begins an intense training program—regular workouts with a trainer, special high protein meals, and even muscle-enhancing drugs—all the while putting up with Charles’ sexual games.
