= Tell It to the Moon =

1987 single by Martha Davis

Single by Martha Davis

from the album Policy
- B-side: "Bridge of Sighs"
- Released: 1988
- Length: 4:08
- Label: Capitol
- Songwriter: Diane Warren
- Producer: Richie Zito

Martha Davis singles chronology
"Don't Tell Me the Time" (1987)	"Tell It to the Moon" (1988)	"Just Like You" (1988)

"Tell It to the Moon" is a song by American singer-songwriter Martha Davis, which was released in 1988 as the second single from her debut solo studio album Policy. The song was written by Diane Warren and produced by Richie Zito. "Tell It to the Moon" failed to chart in the US, but peaked at number 65 on the Australian Music Report chart.

== Background ==
"Tell It to the Moon" was written by Diane Warren, who had previously collaborated with Davis in around 1986–87 when they wrote a song together which was not recorded. A short time later, Davis was made aware of "Tell It to the Moon" and decided to record it for Policy. She revealed in a 1988 interview, "The song we [wrote together] was a good song, but it wasn't brilliant. Later on and somebody said, '[Diane's] written a song that sounds like something you'd write'. That's what hit writers do, they listen to your style and obviously we'd worked together, and so I heard it and I go, 'you know, it does sort of sound like something I'd write'. And then other people said, 'it sounds like a hit' and I go, 'hey, that's a good reason to put it on your album!'"

Speaking of the song's message, Davis commented in 1987, "It's a beautiful song. I would say it's like abstract frustration, being in love with someone that you can't touch and you can't even get up the gumption to actually tell them, so you've got to tell it to the moon."

Davis was later critical of Policy and the commercialised nature of the material. She told Louder Than War in 2017, "[After The Motels' split], the record company scrambled around and I'm singing Diane Warren songs... I was like, "holy crap, this is not right at all. More than anything I'm a writer. That's the main thing I am, the singing was a lucky kind of accident."

== Music video ==
The song's music video was directed by David Fincher. It achieved breakout rotation on MTV.

== Critical reception ==
On its release, Billboard commented, "There are no reasons why 'Don't Tell Me the Time' didn't score; programmers can redeem themselves with this equally engaging rock track from the former Motel." Cash Box predicted the song would be a "sure-fire Top 40 smash" and stated, "No doubt about it, the Motels sound was defined by the emotive voice Davis brought to the songs. This is as satisfying a performance as you'll hear from her." In Australia, Michael Wellham of The Canberra Times described it as a "four-minute Mills & Boon" which is "much the same standard as the other songs on Policy".

== Track listing ==
7–inch single (US and Australasia)

1. "Tell It to the Moon" – 4:08
2. "Bridge of Sighs" – 3:53

7–inch promotional single (US)

1. "Tell It to the Moon" – 4:08
2. "Tell It to the Moon" – 4:08

12–inch promotional single (US)

1. "Tell It to the Moon" – 4:08
2. "Tell It to the Moon" – 4:08

== Personnel ==
Credits are adapted from the Policy CD liner notes.

"Tell It to the Moon"

- Martha Davis – vocals
- Gary Falcone, Kipp Lennon, Carmen Twillie, Joe Pizzulo – backing vocals
- Richie Zito – guitars
- Steve Farris – guitar solo
- Gary Chang – synthesizers
- Randy Jackson – bass
- Michael Baird – drums

Production

- Richie Zito – producer
- Phil Kaffel – engineer
- David Leonard – mixing
- Stephen Marcussen – mastering

== Charts ==
Chart (1988)	Peak position
Australia (Music Report)	65

== Cover versions ==
In 2005, American singer Stephani Krise recorded a version which was released as a single in the US by Dauman Music. It reached number 16 on the Billboard Hot Dance Club Play chart in September 2005.
