= David Fincher =

American filmmaker (born 1962)

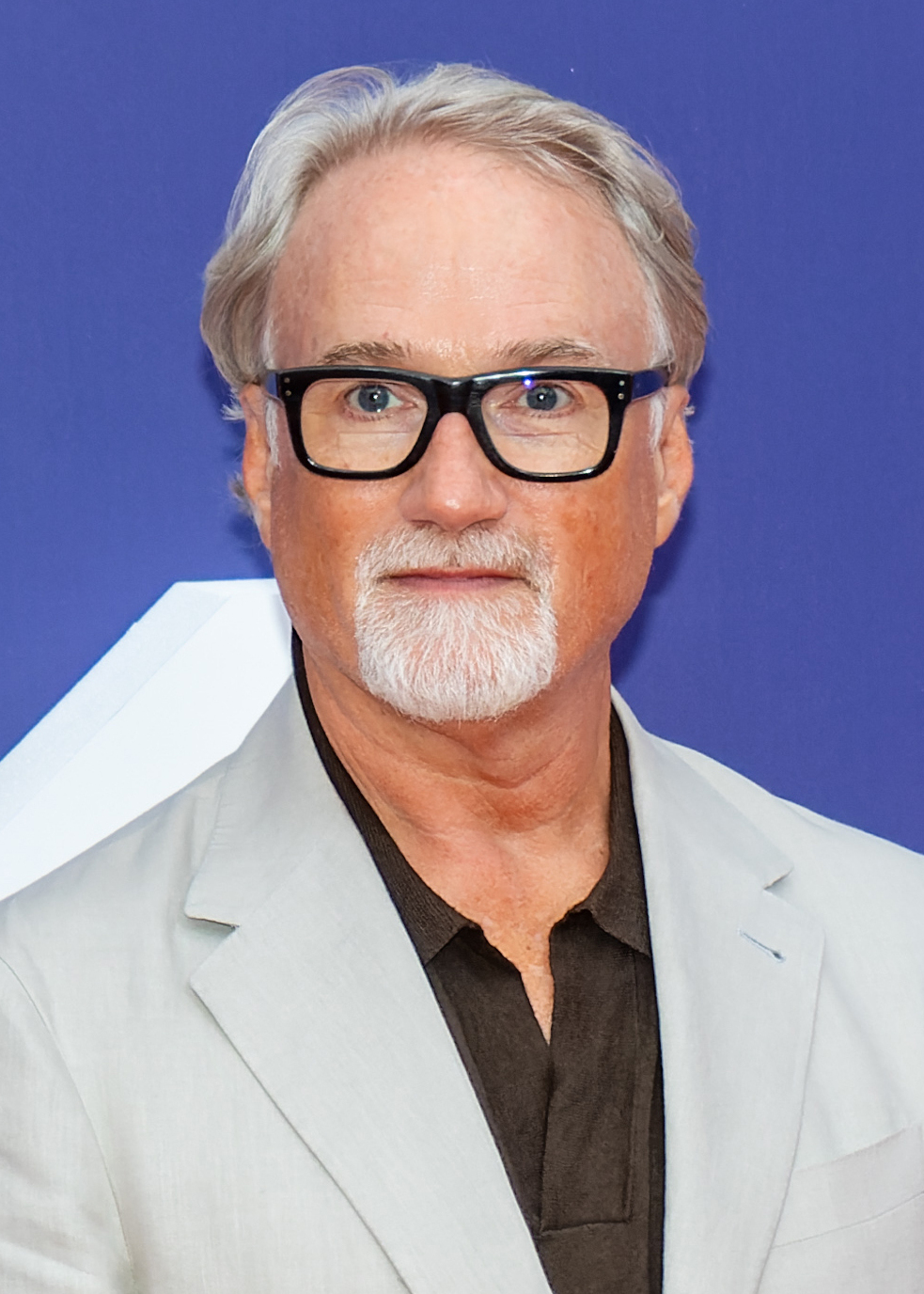
- Fincher in 2023
- Born: August 28, 1962 (age 64); Denver, Colorado, U.S.
- Occupations: Director; producer
- Years active: 1980–present
- Works: Filmography; unrealized projects
- Spouses: Donya Fiorentino (m. 1990; div. 1995) Ceán Chaffin (m. 1996)
- Children: 1
- Relatives: Jack Fincher (father)
- Awards: Full list

David Andrew Leo Fincher (born August 28, 1962) is an American filmmaker. Often described as one of the pre-eminent directors of his generation, (Note: Attributed to multiple sources.) his films have collectively grossed over $2.1 billion worldwide. Fincher has received numerous accolades, including nominations for three Academy Awards as well as a BAFTA Award, a Golden Globe Award, four Primetime Emmy Awards, and two Grammy Awards.

Fincher co-founded the production company Propaganda Films in 1986. He directed numerous music videos for the company, including Madonna's "Express Yourself" in 1989 and "Vogue" in 1990, both of which won him the MTV Video Music Award for Best Direction. He received two Grammy Awards for Best Music Video for "Love Is Strong" (1994) by the Rolling Stones and "Suit & Tie" (2013) by Justin Timberlake featuring Jay-Z.

Fincher made his feature film debut with Alien 3 (1992) and gained his breakthrough with Seven (1995). He has since directed The Game (1997), Fight Club (1999), Panic Room (2002), Zodiac (2007), The Curious Case of Benjamin Button (2008), The Social Network (2010), The Girl with the Dragon Tattoo (2011), Gone Girl (2014), Mank (2020), The Killer (2023), and The Further Mis-Adventures of Cliff Booth (2026). Fincher received nominations for the Academy Award for Best Director for the dramas The Curious Case of Benjamin Button, The Social Network, and Mank. Additionally, Zodiac and The Social Network are ranked in BBC's 2016 poll of the 100 greatest films of the 21st century.

In television, Fincher has served as an executive producer and director for the Netflix political drama series House of Cards (2013–2018) and crime drama series Mindhunter (2017–2019), winning the Primetime Emmy Award for Outstanding Directing for a Drama Series for the pilot episode of the former. He also executive produced and co-created the Netflix animated series Love, Death & Robots (2019–2025), which received three Primetime Emmy Awards for Outstanding Short Form Animated Program.

== Early life and education ==
David Andrew Leo Fincher was born in Denver on August 28, 1962. His mother, Claire Mae (née Boettcher) (1932-2026), was a mental health nurse from South Dakota who worked in drug addiction programs. His father, Howard Kelly "Jack" Fincher (1930–2003), was an author from Oklahoma who worked as a reporter and bureau chief for Life magazine. When Fincher was two years old, the family moved to San Anselmo, California, where he counted filmmaker George Lucas among his neighbors. He became fascinated with filmmaking at the age of eight and began making films on an 8mm camera. In a 2012 interview, he said:

I was eight years old and I saw a documentary on the making of Butch Cassidy and the Sundance Kid. It had never occurred to me that movies didn't take place in real time. I knew that they were fake, I knew that the people were acting, but it had never occurred to me that it could take [...] four months to make a movie! It showed the entire company with all these rental horses and moving trailers to shoot a scene on top of a train. They would hire somebody who looked like Robert Redford to jump onto the train. It never occurred to me that there were hours between each of these shots. The actual circus of it was invisible, as it should be, but in seeing that I became obsessed with the idea of "How?" It was the ultimate magic trick. The notion that 24 still photographs are shown in such quick succession that movement is imparted from it—wow! And I thought that there would never be anything that would be as interesting as that to do with the rest of my life.

As a teenager, Fincher moved to Ashland, Oregon, where he attended Ashland High School. He directed plays and designed sets and lighting after school, was a non-union projectionist at Varsity Theatre, and worked as a production assistant at the KOBI news station in Medford. He supported himself by working as a busboy, dishwasher, and fry cook.

== Career ==
=== 1983–1991: Early work ===
While establishing himself in the film industry, Fincher was employed at John Korty's studio as a production head. Gaining further experience, he became a visual effects producer, working on the animated Twice Upon a Time (1983) with Lucas. He was hired by Industrial Light & Magic (ILM) in 1983 as an assistant cameraman and matte photographer and worked on Return of the Jedi (1983) and Indiana Jones and the Temple of Doom (1984). In 1984, he left ILM to direct a television commercial for the American Cancer Society that depicted a fetus smoking a cigarette.

This quickly brought Fincher to the attention of producers in Los Angeles, and he was soon given the opportunity to direct Rick Springfield's 1985 documentary, To The Beat of the Live Drum. Set on a directing career, Fincher co-founded production company Propaganda Films and started directing commercials and music videos. Other directors such as Dominic Sena, Michael Bay, Antoine Fuqua, Michel Gondry, Spike Jonze, Alex Proyas, Paul Rachman, Mark Romanek, Zack Snyder and Gore Verbinski also honed their skills at Propaganda Films before moving on to feature films.

Fincher directed TV commercials for many companies including Levi's, Converse, Nike, Pepsi, Revlon, Sony, Coca-Cola and Chanel, although he loathed doing them. Starting in 1984, Fincher began his foray into music videos. He directed videos for various artists including singer-songwriters Springfield, Don Henley, Martha Davis, Paula Abdul, rock band The Outfield, and R&B singer Jermaine Stewart. Fincher's 1990 music video for "Freedom! '90" was one of the most successful for George Michael.

He directed Michael Jackson's "Who Is It", Aerosmith's "Janie's Got a Gun" and Billy Idol's "Cradle of Love". For Madonna, he directed the videos for "Express Yourself", "Oh Father", "Bad Girl" and "Vogue". The black-and-white video for "Vogue" took inspiration from the films of the 1920s and 1930s and has been frequently cited as one of the best videos of all time. Between 1984 and 1993, Fincher was credited as a director for 53 music videos. He referred to the production of music videos as his own "film school", in which he learned how to work efficiently within a small budget and time frame.

=== 1992–2000: Breakthrough and acclaim ===
In 1990, 20th Century Fox hired Fincher to replace Vincent Ward as the director for the science-fiction horror Alien 3 (1992), his film directorial debut. It was the third installment in the Alien franchise starring Sigourney Weaver. The film was released in May 1992 to a mixed reception from critics and was considered weaker than the preceding films. From the beginning, Alien 3 was hampered by studio intervention and several abandoned scripts. Peter Travers of the Rolling Stone called the film "bold and haunting", despite the "struggle of nine writers" and "studio interference".

The film received an Academy Award nomination for Best Visual Effects. Years later, Fincher publicly expressed his dismay and subsequently disowned the film. In the book Director's Cut: Picturing Hollywood in the 21st Century, Fincher blames the producers for their lack of trust in him. In an interview with The Guardian in 2009, he stated, "No one hated it more than me; to this day, no one hates it more than me."

After this critical disappointment, Fincher eschewed reading film scripts or directing another project. He briefly retreated to directing commercials and music videos, including the video for the song "Love Is Strong" by The Rolling Stones in 1994, which won the Grammy Award for Best Music Video. Shortly, Fincher decided to make a foray back into film. He read Andrew Kevin Walker's original screenplay for Seven (1995), which had been revised by Jeremiah S. Chechik, the director attached to the project at one point. Fincher expressed no interest in directing the revised version, so New Line Cinema agreed to keep the original ending. Starring Brad Pitt as David Mills, Morgan Freeman as Detective William Somerset, Gwyneth Paltrow as Tracy Mills, R. Lee Ermey as Police Captain, and Kevin Spacey as John Doe, it tells the story of two detectives who attempt to identify a serial killer who bases his murders on the Christian seven deadly sins - Pride, Envy, Wrath, Sloth, Avarice, Gluttony and Lechery. Seven was positively received by film critics and was one of the highest-earning films of 1995, grossing more than $320 million worldwide. Writing for Sight and Sound, John Wrathall said it "stands as the most complex and disturbing entry in the serial killer genre since Manhunter" and Roger Ebert opined that Seven is "one of the darkest and most merciless films ever made in the Hollywood mainstream."

Following Seven, Fincher directed a music video for "6th Avenue Heartache" by The Wallflowers and went on to direct his third feature film, the mystery thriller The Game (1997), written by the duo John Brancato and Michael Ferris. Fincher also hired Seven screenwriter Walker to contribute and polish the script. Filmed on location in San Francisco, the story follows an investment banker, played by Michael Douglas, who receives an unusual gift from his younger brother (Sean Penn), where he becomes involved in a "game" that integrates with his everyday life, making him unable to differentiate between game and reality. Almar Haflidason of the BBC was critical of the ending, but praised the visuals—"Fincher does a marvelous job of turning ordinary city locations into frightening backdrops, where every corner turned is another step into the unknown". Upon The Game's release in September 1997, the film received generally favorable reviews but performed moderately at the box office. The Game was later included in the Criterion Collection.

In August 1997, Fincher agreed to direct Fight Club, based on the 1996 novel of the same name by Chuck Palahniuk. It was his second film with 20th Century Fox after the troubled production of Alien 3. Starring Pitt, Edward Norton and Helena Bonham Carter, the film is about a nameless office worker suffering from insomnia, who meets a salesman, and together form an underground fighting club as a form of therapy. Fox struggled with the marketing of the film, and were concerned that it would have a limited audience. Fight Club premiered on October 15, 1999, in the United States to a polarized response and modest box office success; the film grossed $100.9 million against a budget of $63 million. Initially, many critics thought the film was "a violent and dangerous express train of masochism and aggression." However, in following years, Fight Club became a cult favorite and gained acknowledgement for its multilayered themes; the film has been the source of critical analysis from academics and film critics.

=== 2001–2012: Established filmmaker ===
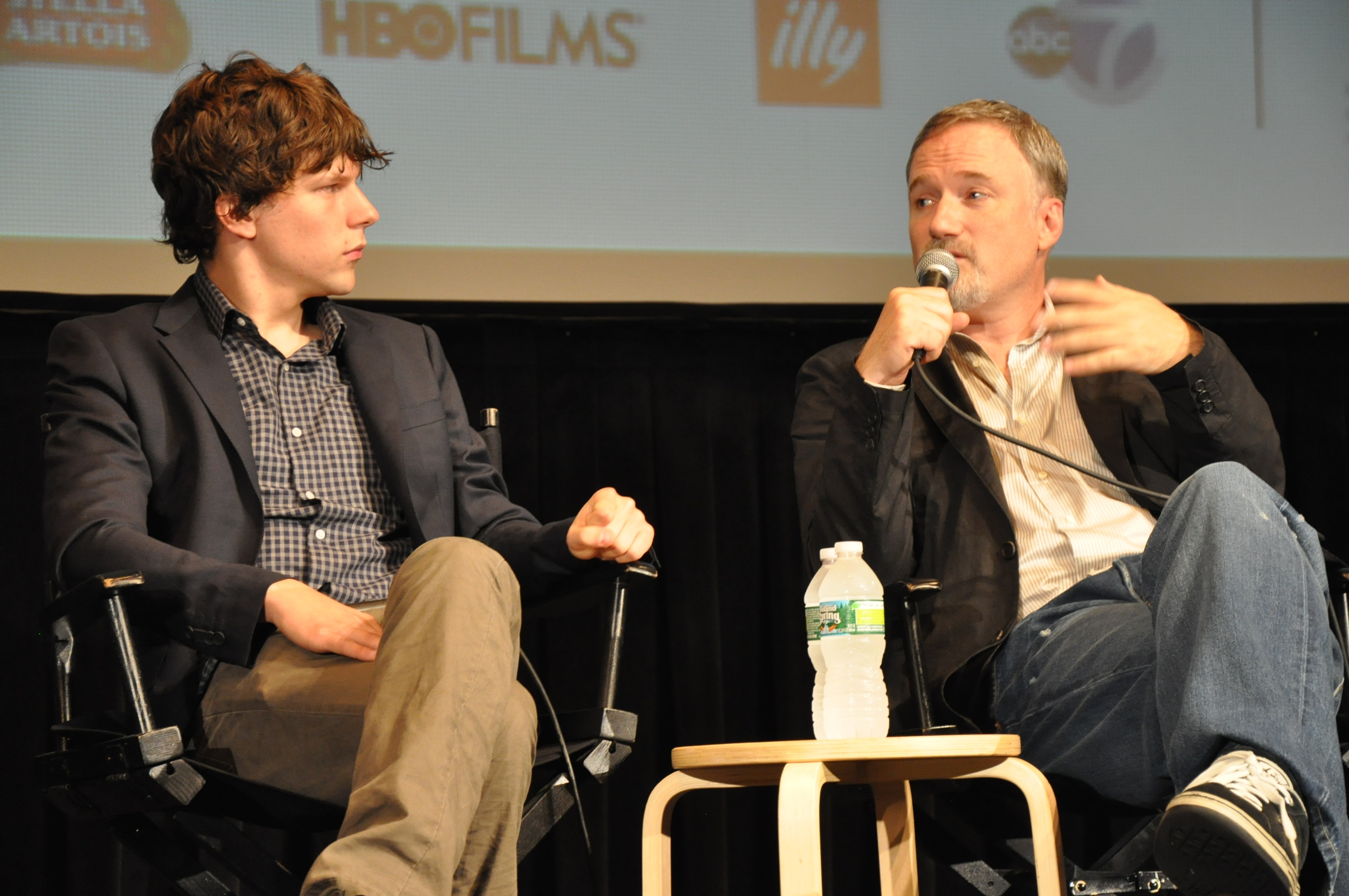
Jesse Eisenberg and Fincher at the 2010 New York Film Festival

In 2001, Fincher served as an executive producer for the first season of The Hire, a series of short films to promote BMW automobiles. The films were released on the internet in 2001. Next in 2002, Fincher returned with another feature film, a thriller titled Panic Room. The story follows a single mother and her daughter who hide in a safe room of their new home, during a home invasion by a trio. Starring Jodie Foster (who replaced Nicole Kidman), Forest Whitaker, Kristen Stewart, Dwight Yoakam, and Jared Leto, it was theatrically released on March 29, 2002, after a month delay, to critical acclaim and commercial success.

In North America, the film earned $96.4 million. In other countries, it grossed $100 million for a worldwide $196.4 million. Mick LaSalle of the San Francisco Chronicle praised the filmmakers for their "fair degree of ingenuity ... for 88 minutes of excitement" and the convincing performance given by Foster. Fincher acknowledged Panic Room for being more mainstream, describing the film, "It's supposed to be a popcorn movie—there are no great, overriding implications. It's just about survival."

Five years after Panic Room, Fincher returned on March 2, 2007, with Zodiac, a thriller based on Robert Graysmith's books about the search for the Zodiac Killer, a real life serial murderer who terrorized communities between the late 1960s and early 1970s. Fincher first learned of the project after being approached by producer Bradley J. Fischer; he was intrigued by the story due to his childhood personal experience. "The highway patrol had been following our school buses", he recalled. His father told him, "There's a serial killer who has killed four or five people ... who's threatened to ... shoot the children as they come off the bus."

After extensive research on the case with fellow producers, Fincher formed a principal cast of Jake Gyllenhaal, Mark Ruffalo, Robert Downey Jr., Anthony Edwards and Brian Cox. It was the first of Fincher's films to be shot in digital, with a Thomson Viper FilmStream HD camera. However, high-speed film cameras were used for particular murder scenes. Zodiac was well received, appearing in more than two hundred top ten lists (only No Country for Old Men and There Will Be Blood appeared in more). However, the film struggled at the United States box office, earning $33 million, but did better overseas with a gross of $51.7 million. Worldwide, Zodiac was a moderate success. Despite a campaign by Paramount Pictures, the film did not receive any major award nominations.

In 2008, Fincher was attached to a film adaptation of the science-fiction novel, Rendezvous with Rama by Arthur C. Clarke, however, Fincher said the film is unlikely to go ahead due to problems with the script. His next project was The Curious Case of Benjamin Button (2008), an adaptation of F. Scott Fitzgerald's eponymous 1923 short story, about a man who is born as a seventy-year-old baby and ages in reverse. The romantic-drama marked Fincher's third collaboration with Pitt, who stars opposite Cate Blanchett. The budget for the film was estimated to be $167 million, with very expensive visual effects utilized for Pitt's character.

Filming started in November 2006 in New Orleans, taking advantage of Louisiana's film incentive. The film was theatrically released on December 25, 2008, in the United States to a commercial success and warm reception. Writing for the USA Today, Claudia Puig praises the "graceful and poignant" tale despite it being "overlong and not as emotionally involving as it could be". The film received thirteen Academy Award nominations, including Best Picture, Best Director for Fincher, Best Actor for Pitt, and Best Supporting Actress for Taraji P. Henson, and won three, for Best Art Direction, Best Makeup, and Best Visual Effects.

Fincher directed the 2010 film The Social Network, a biographical drama about Facebook founder, Mark Zuckerberg and his legal battles. The screenplay was written by Aaron Sorkin, who adapted it from the book The Accidental Billionaires by Ben Mezrich. It stars Jesse Eisenberg as Zuckerberg, with a supporting cast of Andrew Garfield, Justin Timberlake, Armie Hammer and Max Minghella. Principal photography started in October 2009 in Cambridge, Massachusetts and the film was released one year later. The Social Network was also a commercial success, earning $224.9 million worldwide. At the 83rd Academy Awards, the film received eight nominations and won three awards; soundtrack composers Trent Reznor and Atticus Ross won for Best Original Score, and the other two awards were for Best Adapted Screenplay and Best Film Editing. The film also received awards for Best Motion Picture – Drama, Best Director, Best Screenplay, and Best Original Score at the 68th Golden Globe Awards. Critics including Ebert, complimented the writing, describing the film as having "spellbinding dialogue. It makes an untellable story clear and fascinating".

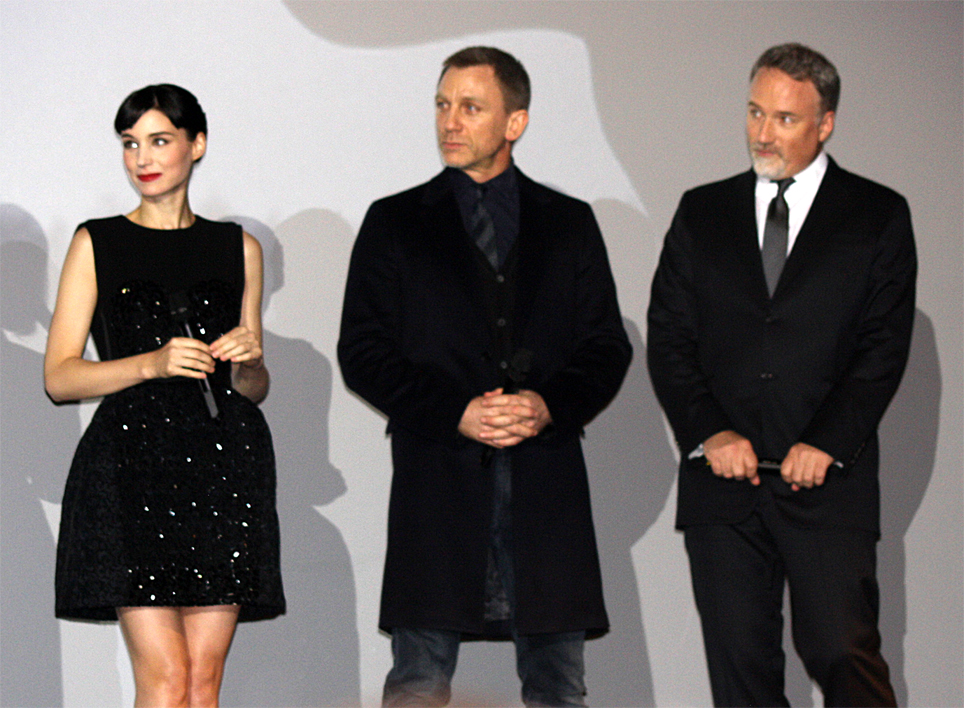
Rooney Mara, Daniel Craig, and Fincher at the premiere of The Girl with the Dragon Tattoo in 2011

In 2011, Fincher followed the success of The Social Network with The Girl with the Dragon Tattoo, a psychological thriller based on the novel by Swedish writer Stieg Larsson. Screenwriter Steven Zaillian spent three months analyzing the novel, writing notes and deleting elements to achieve a suitable running time. Featuring Daniel Craig as journalist Mikael Blomkvist and Rooney Mara as Lisbeth Salander, it follows Blomkvist's investigation to solve what happened to a woman from a wealthy family who disappeared four decades ago. To maintain the novel's setting, the film was primarily shot in Sweden.

The soundtrack, composed by collaborators Reznor and Ross, was described by A. O. Scott of The New York Times as "unnerving and powerful". Upon the film's release in December, reviews were generally favorable, according to review aggregator Metacritic. Scott adds, "Mr. Fincher creates a persuasive ambience of political menace and moral despair". Philip French of The Guardian praised the "authentic, quirky detail" and faithful adaptation. The film received five Academy Award nominations, including Best Actress for Mara, and won the award for Best Film Editing. In 2012, Fincher signed a first look deal with Regency Enterprises.

=== 2013–present: Collaborations with Netflix ===
In 2013, Fincher served as an executive producer for the Netflix television series House of Cards, a political thriller about a Congressman's quest for revenge, of which he also directed the first two episodes. The series received positive reviews, earning nine Primetime Emmy Award nominations, including Outstanding Drama Series; Fincher won the Primetime Emmy Award for Outstanding Directing for a Drama Series for the first episode. He also directed a music video for the first time since 2005, "Suit & Tie" by Timberlake and Jay-Z, which won the Grammy Award for Best Music Video.

Fincher directed Gone Girl (2014), an adaptation of Gillian Flynn's novel of the same name, which was also scripted by Flynn, starring Ben Affleck and Rosamund Pike. He even met with Flynn to discuss his interest in the project before a director was selected. Set in Missouri, the story begins as a mystery that follows the events surrounding Nick Dunne (Affleck), who becomes the prime suspect in the sudden disappearance of his wife Amy (Pike). A critical and commercial success, the film earned $369 million worldwide against a $61 million budget, making it Fincher's highest-grossing work to date. Writing for Salon.com, Andrew O'Hehir praised the "tremendous ensemble cast who mesh marvelously", adding, "All the technical command of image, sound and production design for which Fincher is justly famous is here as well." Gone Girl garnered awards and nominations in a various categories; Pike earned an Academy Award nomination for Best Actress and Fincher received his third Golden Globe Award nomination for Best Director.

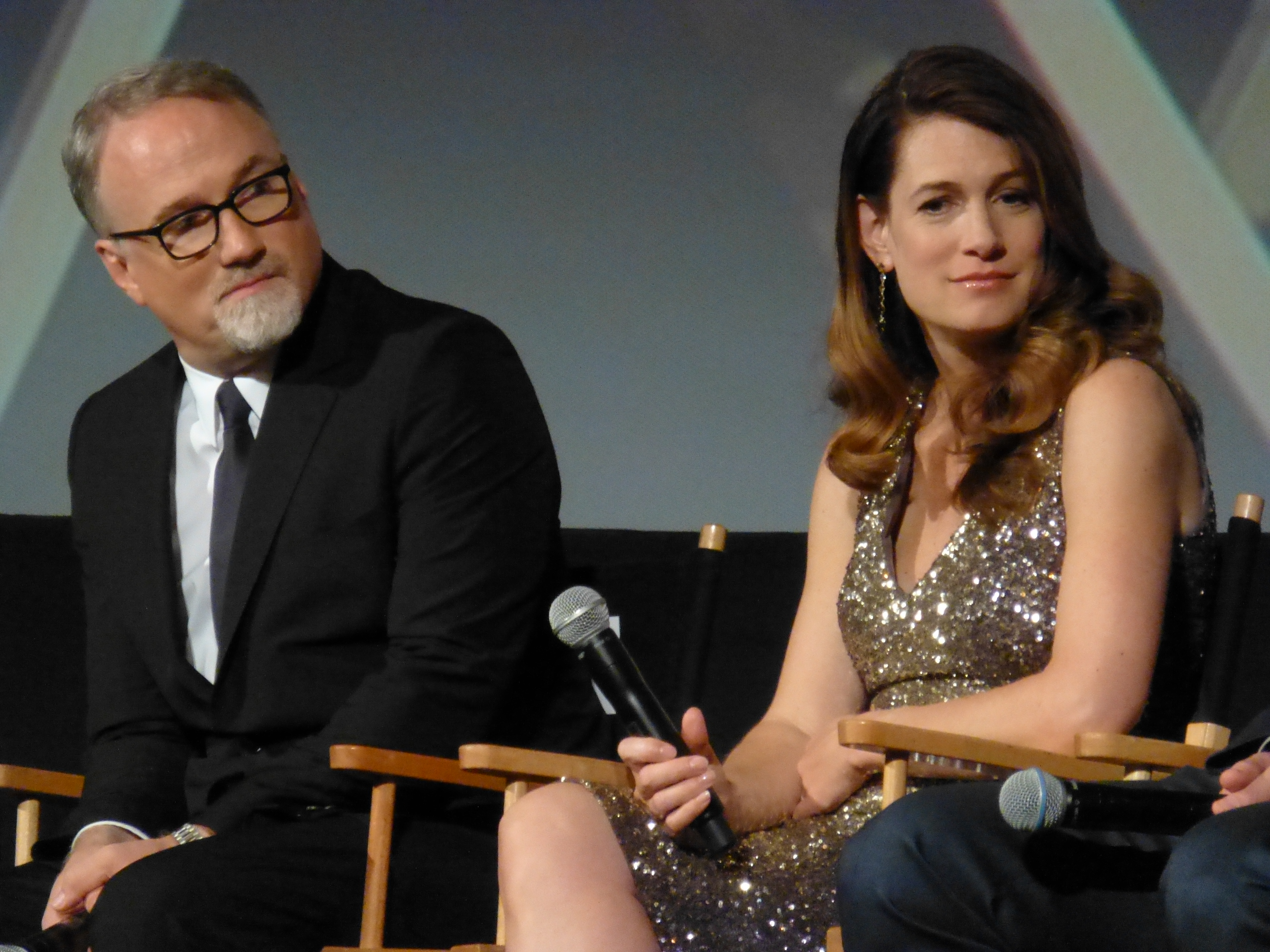
Fincher and Gillian Flynn at the 2014 New York Film Festival

Also in 2014, Fincher signed a deal with HBO for three television series—Utopia (an adaptation of the British series, to be written by Flynn), Shakedown, and Videosyncrazy. In August 2015, budget disputes between him and the network halted production. However, in 2018, Utopia was picked up by Amazon MGM Studios, with Flynn as creator.

Between 2016 and 2019, Fincher directed, produced and served as showrunner for another series, Mindhunter, starring Holt McCallany, Jonathan Groff and Anna Torv. The series, based on the book Mindhunter: Inside the FBI's Elite Serial Crime Unit, debuted on Netflix worldwide on October 13, 2017. He has expressed interest in eventually making a third season of Mindhunter, which was put on indefinite hold in 2020. In 2023, Fincher confirmed that Netflix will not be making a third season of Mindhunter, saying "I'm very proud of the first two seasons. But it's a very expensive show and, in the eyes of Netflix, we didn't attract enough of an audience to justify such an investment [for Season 3]."

In June 2017, Jim Gianopulos of Paramount Pictures announced that a sequel to World War Z was "in advanced development" with Pitt and Fincher. Producers Dede Gardner and Jeremy Kleiner said that Fincher would begin directing it in June 2019. However, in February 2019, Paramount cancelled the project. As of 2019, Fincher serves as an executive producer for Love, Death & Robots, an animated science-fiction web series created by Tim Miller for Netflix.

In July 2019, Fincher signed on to direct Mank, a biopic about Citizen Kane screenwriter Herman J. Mankiewicz, based on a screenplay written by his late father, Jack, with Gary Oldman portraying Mankiewicz. Mank received a limited theatrical release on November 13, 2020, and was made available on Netflix on December 4. The film received ten Academy Award nominations, and won two: Best Cinematography and Best Production Design. Wendy Ide, writing for The Guardian, praised Fincher for his nod to old Hollywood, and theatrical approach to Mank.

Fincher served as an executive producer on a series titled Voir (2021) for Netflix. In 2022, Fincher made his first foray in animation directing an episode for the third season of Love, Death & Robots. The episode, "Bad Travelling", was written by Seven screenwriter Walker. In February 2021, it was reported that Fincher would direct an adaptation of the graphic novel The Killer for Netflix, with Walker writing the screenplay and Michael Fassbender attached to star. It premiered at the 80th Venice International Film Festival on September 3, 2023, began a limited theatrical release on October 27, and was released on Netflix on November 10. The film received generally positive reviews from critics.

In 2024, it was reported that Fincher was interested in working on an American adaptation of the popular Korean series Squid Game and was developing it alongside a Chinatown (1974) prequel miniseries that he co-wrote with the late Robert Towne. It was confirmed in October 2024 that he would develop and work on the Squid Game adaptation for 2025. In 2026, Fincher directed The Further Mis-Adventures of Cliff Booth (2026), a sequel to Quentin Tarantino's Once Upon a Time in Hollywood (2019), written by Tarantino and starring Pitt in the lead role, marking their fourth collaboration between them. In September 2026, it was reported that Fincher would not renew his deal with Netflix following its expiration in 2027, with The Further Mis-Adventures of Cliff Booth being the last project under the deal.

== Filmmaking style and techniques ==
=== Influences ===
Fincher did not attend film school. He has listed filmmakers George Roy Hill, Alfred Hitchcock, Stanley Kubrick, Alan J. Pakula, Ridley Scott, and Martin Scorsese as his major influences. His personal favorite films include Rear Window (1954), Lawrence of Arabia (1962), The Graduate (1967), Paper Moon (1973), American Graffiti (1973), Jaws (1975), All the President's Men (1976), Taxi Driver (1976), Close Encounters of the Third Kind (1977), and Zelig (1983). He suggested that his film Panic Room is a combination of Rear Window and Straw Dogs (1971).

For Seven, Fincher and cinematographer Darius Khondji were inspired by films The French Connection (1971) and Klute (1971), as well as the work of photographer Robert Frank. He has cited graphic designer Saul Bass as an inspiration for his films' title sequences; Bass designed many such sequences for prominent directors, including Hitchcock and Kubrick.

=== Method ===
Those are the moments where moviemaking is not like writing, and it's not like the theater, and it's not like performance art, and it's not like sculpting. It's truly its own discipline. There's nothing else like it in those moments where you go, wow, here's an intent that was probably never even thought of by the guy who wrote the book. And yet this person who may or may not have even read the source material has found this thing. That, for me, after the previsualization, is the most exciting part of the whole.

— Fincher on serendipity during filmmaking.

Fincher's filmmaking process always begins with extensive research and preparation, although he has said the process is different every time: "I enjoy reading a script that you can see in your head, and then I enjoy the casting and I enjoy the rehearsal, and I enjoy all the meetings about what it should be, what it could be, what it might be." He has admitted to having autocratic tendencies and prefers to micromanage every aspect of a film's production. Icelandic film producer Sigurjón Sighvatsson, with whom Fincher has collaborated for decades, has said that "[Fincher] was always a rebel ... always challenging the status quo".

Known for his perfectionism and meticulous eye for detail, Fincher performs thorough research when casting actors to ensure their suitability for the part. His colleague Max Daly said, "He's really good at finding the one detail that was missed. He knows more than anybody." Producer Laura Ziskin said of him, "He's just scary smart, sort of smarter than everyone else in the room." He approaches editing like "intricate mathematical problems." Long-time collaborator Angus Wall said that editing Zodiac was like "putting together a Swiss watch ... all the pieces are so beautifully machined". He elaborated, "[Fincher] is incredibly specific. He never settles. And there's a purity that shows in his work."

When working with actors, Fincher is known to demand a grueling series of takes to capture a scene perfectly. For instance, the Zodiac cast members were required to do upwards of 70 takes for certain scenes, much to the displeasure of Jake Gyllenhaal. Rooney Mara had to endure 99 takes for a scene in The Social Network and said that Fincher enjoys challenging people. Gone Girl averaged 50 takes per scene. In one of the episodes for Mindhunter, it was reported that a nine-minute scene took 11 hours to shoot. When asked about this method, Fincher said, "I hate earnestness in performance ... usually by take 17 the earnestness is gone." He added that he wants a scene to be as natural and authentic as possible. Some actors appreciate this approach, arguing that the subtle adjustments have a big difference in the way a scene is carried. Others have been critical, with R. Lee Ermey stating, "[Fincher] wants puppets. He doesn't want actors that are creative."

Fincher prefers shooting with Red digital cameras, under natural or pre-existing light conditions rather than using elaborate lighting setups. Fincher is known to use computer-generated imagery, which is mostly unnoticeable to the viewer. He does not normally use hand-held cameras during filming, instead preferring cameras on a tripod. He said, "Handheld has a powerful psychological stranglehold. It means something specific and I don't want to cloud what's going on with too much meaning." He has experimented with the disembodied camera movement, notably in Panic Room, where the camera glides around the house to give the impression of surveillance by an unseen observer.

=== Style and themes ===
Fincher's visual style includes a particular way in which he uses tilt, pan, and track in the camera movements. When a character is in motion or expressing emotions, the camera moves at the exact same speed and direction as their body. The movements are choreographed precisely between the actors and camera operators. The resulting effect helps the audience connect with the character to understand their feelings. Similarly, in his music videos, Fincher appreciated that the visuals should enhance the listening experience. He would cut around the vocals, and let the choreography finish before cutting the shot. Camera movements are synchronized to the beat of the music.

Some regard Fincher as an auteur filmmaker, although he dislikes being associated with that term. Much of his work is influenced by classical film noir and neo noir genres. Fincher's visual style also includes using monochromatic and desaturated colors of blue, green, and yellow, representing the world that the characters are in. In The Girl with the Dragon Tattoo, Fincher uses heavy desaturation for certain scenes, and increases or decreases the effect based on the story or characters' emotions. Erik Messerschmidt, cinematographer for Mindhunter, explained the color palette: "The show has a desaturated green-yellow look ... [it] helps give the show its period feel." He states the effect is achieved through production design, costumes, and filming locations—not necessarily through lighting used on set. Fincher also favors detailed and pronounced shadows, as well as using minimal light. When asked about his use of dim lighting, he said bright lights make the color of skin appear unnatural, and that the lights and colors in his films represent "the way the world looks to [him]".

Fincher has explored themes of martyrdom, alienation, and dehumanization of both culture and society. In addition to the wider themes of good and evil, his characters are usually troubled, discontented, engrossed and flawed outsiders, outcasts, loners and misfits; they are often unable to socialize and suffer from loneliness. (Note: Attributed to multiple sources.) In Seven, Zodiac, and The Social Network, themes of pressure and obsession are explored, leading to the character's downfall. Quoting historian Frank Krutnik, the writer Piers McCarthy argues that "the protagonists of these films are not totally in control of their actions but are subject to darker, inner impulses".

In a 2017 interview, Fincher explained his fascination of sinister themes: "There was always a house in any neighborhood that I ever lived in that all the kids on the street wondered, 'What are those people up to?' We sort of attach the sinister to the mundane in order to make things interesting ... I think it's also because in order for something to be evil, it almost has to cloak itself as something else." Fincher once stated, "I think people are perverts. I've maintained that. That's the foundation of my career."

=== Collaborators ===
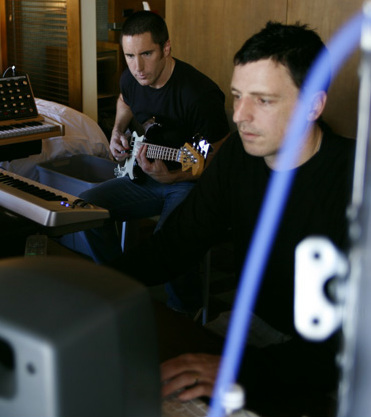
Frequent Fincher collaborators Trent Reznor and Atticus Ross

Over the course of his career, Fincher has shown loyalty to many members of his cast and crew. As a music video director, he collaborated with Paula Abdul five times, as well as Madonna and Rick Springfield four times each. Once he made the transition to feature films, he cast Brad Pitt in three of them. He said of Pitt, "On-screen and off-screen, Brad's the ultimate guy ... he has such a great ease with who he is." Bob Stephenson, Michael Massee, Christopher John Fields, John Getz, Elias Koteas, Zach Grenier, Charles Dance, Rooney Mara, Jared Leto, Arliss Howard, Tilda Swinton, and Richmond Arquette have also appeared in at least two of his films.

Fight Club was scored by the Dust Brothers, who at that point had never scored a film. Describing their working relationship with Fincher, they said he "was not hanging over our shoulders telling us what to do" and that the only direction he gave was to make the music sound as great as the score from The Graduate (1967). Nine Inch Nails members Trent Reznor and Atticus Ross composed the music for The Social Network, The Girl with the Dragon Tattoo, Gone Girl, Mank, and The Killer. The musicians describe their working relationship as "collaborative, respectful, and inspiring" although quipped that it "hasn't gotten any easier". Many years before the duo worked with Fincher, he arranged for a remix of the Nine Inch Nails song "Closer" to play over the opening credits of Seven. Howard Shore composed the scores for Seven, The Game, and Panic Room.

Darius Khondji and Jeff Cronenweth have served as cinematographers for Fincher's films. Khondji said, "Fincher deserves a lot of credit. It was his influence that pushed me to experiment and got me as far as I did." Fincher has hired sound designer Ren Klyce in all his films since 1995 and trusts him "implicitly". He has worked with film editor Angus Wall since 1988. Wall has worked on seven of his films, five of which as editor.

Donald Graham Burt has served as a production designer for six films and Bob Wagner has served as an assistant director for six. Casting director Laray Mayfield has worked with Fincher for over 20 years. In a 2010 interview, Fincher said, "You don't have to love all of your co-collaborators, but you do have to respect them. And when you do, when you realize that people bring stuff to the table that's not necessarily your experience, but if you allow yourself to relate to it, it can enrich the buffet that you're going to bring with you into the editing room."

== Personal life ==
Fincher married Donya Fiorentino in 1994. They had one daughter together, before divorcing in 1995. He retained full physical and legal custody of his daughter throughout her minority. Fincher married producer Ceán Chaffin in 1996 and they raised his daughter.

== Filmography ==
Year	Title	Distributor
1992	Alien 3	20th Century Fox
1995	Seven	New Line Cinema
1997	The Game	PolyGram Filmed Entertainment
1999	Fight Club	20th Century Fox
2002	Panic Room	Sony Pictures Releasing
2007	Zodiac	Paramount Pictures / Warner Bros. Pictures
2008	The Curious Case of Benjamin Button	Paramount Pictures / Warner Bros. Pictures
2010	The Social Network	Sony Pictures Releasing
2011	The Girl with the Dragon Tattoo	Sony Pictures Releasing
2014	Gone Girl	20th Century Fox
2020	Mank	Netflix
2023	The Killer	Netflix
2026	The Further Mis-Adventures of Cliff Booth	Netflix

== Awards and recognitions ==
Tim Walker of The Independent praised Fincher's work, stating "His portrayals of the modern psyche have a power and precision that few film-makers can match." In 2003, Fincher was ranked 39th in The Guardian's 40 best directors. In 2012, The Guardian listed him again in their ranking of 23 best film directors in the world, applauding "his ability to sustain tone and tension". In 2016, Zodiac and The Social Network appeared in the BBC's 100 Greatest Films of the 21st Century list. In addition to films, Fincher has often been admired for producing some of the most creative music videos.

Fincher received three Academy Award for Best Director nominations for The Curious Case of Benjamin Button (2008), The Social Network (2010), and Mank (2020). He won both the BAFTA Award for Best Direction and the Golden Globe Award for Best Director for The Social Network. He has four nominations for the DGA Award for Outstanding Directing – Feature Film for The Curious Case of Benjamin Button (2008), The Social Network (2010), The Girl with the Dragon Tattoo (2011) and Mank (2020) as well as a nomination for Outstanding Directing – Drama Series for House of Cards (2013). His work on the latter also earned him the Primetime Emmy Award for Outstanding Directing for a Drama Series and the Peabody Award in addition to four nominations for the PGA Award for Best Episodic Drama.

Fincher also received two Grammy Awards for Best Music Video for "Love Is Strong" (1995) by The Rolling Stones and "Suit & Tie" (2013) by Justin Timberlake and Jay-Z as well as three Primetime Emmy Awards for Outstanding Short Form Animated Program for Love, Death & Robots.

Awards and nominations received by Fincher's films
Year	Title	Academy Awards		BAFTA Awards		Golden Globe Awards	
Year	Title	Nominations	Wins	Nominations	Wins	Nominations	Wins
1992	Alien 3	1		1			
1995	Seven	1		1			
1999	Fight Club	1					
2008	The Curious Case of Benjamin Button	13	3	11	3	5	
2010	The Social Network	8	3	6	3	6	4
2011	The Girl with the Dragon Tattoo	5	1	2		2	
2014	Gone Girl	1		2		4	
2020	Mank	10	2	6	1	6	
Total		40	9	29	7	23	4

Directed Academy Award performances
Under Fincher's direction, these actors have received Academy Award nominations for their performances in the respective roles.

Year	Performer	Film	Result
Academy Award for Best Actor
2008	Brad Pitt	The Curious Case of Benjamin Button	Nominated
2010	Jesse Eisenberg	The Social Network	Nominated
2020	Gary Oldman	Mank	Nominated
Academy Award for Best Actress
2011	Rooney Mara	The Girl with the Dragon Tattoo	Nominated
2014	Rosamund Pike	Gone Girl	Nominated
Academy Award for Best Supporting Actress
2008	Taraji P. Henson	The Curious Case of Benjamin Button	Nominated
2020	Amanda Seyfried	Mank	Nominated

== Bibliography ==
- Waxman, Sharon, ed. (2005). Rebels on the Backlot: Six Maverick Directors and How They Conquered the Hollywood Studio System. HarperEntertainment.
- Browning, Mark (2010). David Fincher: Films that Scar. ABC-CLIO. ISBN 978-0-313-37772-3.
- Hartenstein, Katharina (2007). Expositionsanalyse des Films "Fight Club" von David Fincher. GRIN Verlag. ISBN 978-3-638-76361-5.
- Januschke, Alexander (2010). Die Bildsprache von David Fincher anhand SE7EN und FIGHT CLUB. GRIN Verlag. ISBN 978-3-640-64899-3.
- Lacey, Nick (November 1, 2001). Se7en: director, David Fincher. Longman. ISBN 978-0-582-45257-2.
- Swallow, James (April 1, 2007). Dark Eye: The Films of David Fincher. Reynolds & Hearn. ISBN 978-1-905287-30-7.
