= Adriana Lima =

Brazilian model (born 1981)

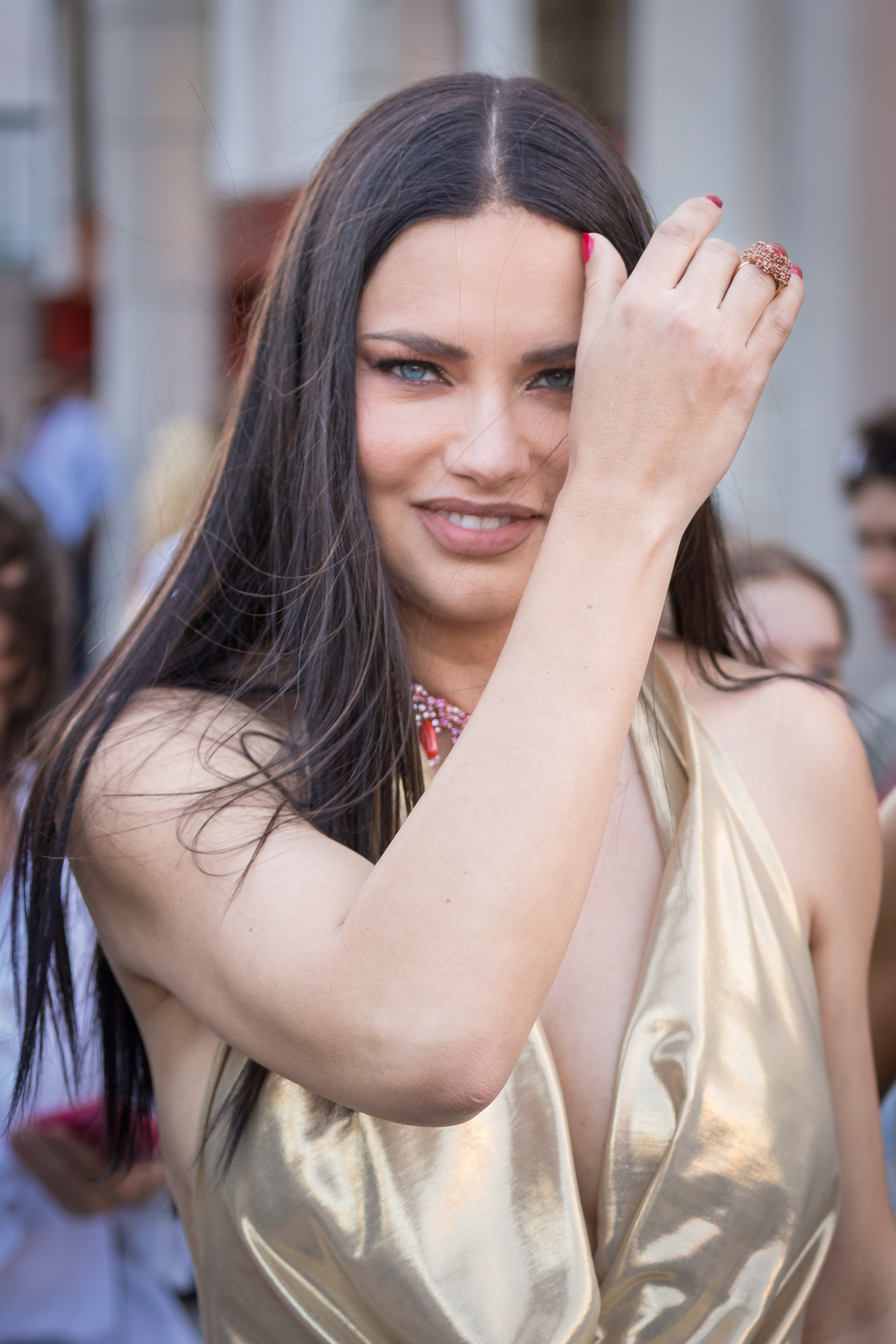
- Lima in 2023
- Born: 12 June 1981 (age 45); Salvador, Bahia, Brazil
- Occupation: Model
- Years active: 1996–present
- Spouses: Marko Jarić (m. 2009; div. 2016) Andre Lemmers (m. 2024)
- Children: 3
- Modeling information
- Height: 5 ft 10 in (1.78 m)
- Hair color: Dark Brown
- Eye color: Blue/Green
- Agency: The Society Management (New York); Elite Model Management (Paris, London, Milan)
- Website: adrianalima.com

Adriana Lima (Portuguese pronunciation: [adɾiˈɐ̃nɐ ˈlĩmɐ]; born 12 June 1981) is a Brazilian model. She was a Victoria's Secret Angel from 2000 to 2018, having made her Victoria's Secret Fashion Show debut in 1999, making her the longest-running Victoria's Secret Angel and model. In 2017, she was named "the most valuable Victoria's Secret Angel" by American analytics company D’Marie. She is also known for her Super Bowl and Kia Motors commercials.

Lima is currently ranked by models.com as one of the "legends". In 2012, she came in 4th place on the Forbes top-earning models list, estimated to have earned $7.3 million in one year. In 2013, she came in 3rd place and in 2014 she came in 2nd place with earnings of $8 million. In 2015, she came in 2nd place with earnings of $9 million. In 2016, she kept the second place with earnings of US$10.5 million.

Lima has served as brand ambassador for the clothing brand Desigual based in Barcelona, Spain, for the Beachwear collection of Italian brand Calzedonia, and for the ready-to-wear collection of Italian brand Sportmax. She has also served as an ambassador for the International Watch Company (IWC), Puma, Maybelline, and Chopard.

== Early life ==
Lima was born on 12 June 1981 in Salvador, Bahia, Brazil. Many sources stated that "Francesca" is her middle name, but Lima herself denied this in an interview to W Radio Colombia in 2010, and confirmed that her name is only Adriana Lima. Her parents are Nelson Torres, a carpenter, and Maria das Graças Lima, a social worker. Torres left the family when she was six months old, and Lima was raised by her mother. Despite this, Lima has expressed appreciation for her time spent with her father before his death in 2015. She was raised in the Castelo Branco neighbourhood of Salvador. Prior to modelling, she had planned to pursue a career as a paediatrician.

Lima is of Portuguese, Native Brazilian, African, Japanese, Swiss, and West Indian descent. (Note: English translated sources and Lima herself states she has "Indian" ancestry. The ambiguous meaning of the word "Indian" in English, which can refer to either the indigenous peoples of the Americas or people native to the country of India, has led some to misinterpret her Amerindian ancestry, claiming that Lima's "Indian" background refers to the country of India. However, in English slang, "Indian" is meant to refer to indigenous peoples of the Americas. In Portuguese, such ambiguity is nonexistent, since there are two words to convey the different meanings: índio for an American Indian (or Amerindian, including Native Brazilians); and indiano for people and things related to India.) She personally identifies as Afro-Brazilian.

Lima speaks four languages: her native Portuguese, English, Italian, and Spanish.

== Career ==
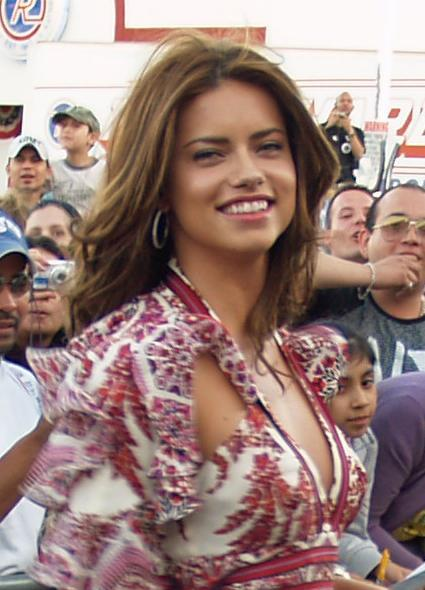
At the premiere of Spider-Man 3 at the Tribeca Film Festival in Queens, New York City in 2007

Lima never thought about being a model, although she had won many beauty pageants in elementary school. However, a friend at school who wanted to enter a modeling contest and did not want to enter alone, so Lima entered with her. Both sent in pictures, and the contest sponsor soon asked Lima to come out for the competition. Soon after, at age 15, she entered and finished in first place in Ford's "Supermodel of Brazil" model search. She subsequently entered the 1996 Ford Models Supermodel of the World contest and finished in second place. A year later, Lima moved to New York City and signed with Elite Model Management.

Lima made her runway debut at Anna Sui's New York Fashion Week show in September 1997. As a runway model, she has walked the catwalk for designers such as Rosa Cha, Blue man, Fashion's Night Out, Caio Gobbi, Fause Haten, M. Officer, Luca Luca, Liverpool Fashion, Dosso Dossi, Carmen Steffens, Cía Maritima, Agua de Coco, Lino Villaventura, Forum, Vassarette, Zoomp, Joan Vass, Cori, Emilio Pucci, Fendi, Giles Deacon, Carmen Marc Valvo, Emanuel Ungaro, Baby Phat, Giorgio Armani, Balmain, Bottega Veneta, Sportmax, Vera Wang, Valentino, Miu Miu, Givenchy, Versace, Cividini, Alexandre Herchcovitch, Jason Wu, Marc Jacobs, Christian Dior, Paco Rabanne, Victoria's Secret, Sean John, Prada, Louis Vuitton, Desigual, Cynthia Rowley, Sully Bonnelly, Anna Sui, Guy Laroche, John Galliano, Alexander McQueen, Yigal Azrouël, Ralph Lauren, Christian Lacroix, Escada, Nanette Lepore, Richard Tyler, Triton, and Betsey Johnson.

Her first magazine cover was Marie Claire Brazil in September 1998. Her first Vogue covers were the Italian Vogue Gioiello in September 2000, on their 20th Anniversary issue, and Vogue Brasil the next month.

Lima became a GUESS? girl in 2000, appearing in that year's fall ad campaign. She also appeared in the book A Second Decade of Guess? Images.

Lima continued to build upon her portfolio, doing more print work for Maybelline, for whom she has worked as a spokesmodel since 2003 to 2009. Also in the same year, she appeared in the company's first calendar and did an ad campaign for Swatch. Lima has also worked for notable fashion brands bebe, Armani, Versace, De Beers, Elie Saab, Colcci, Schiaparelli, Prada, Intimissimi, GUESS?, LOEWE, H&M, Bulgari, Miu Miu, DKNY, Emporio Armani, Givenchy, Keds, Mossimo, Jason Wu, Balmain, Blumarine, Marc Jacobs, Maybelline, BCBG, and Louis Vuitton.

She also appeared on the covers and in the editorials of other fashion magazines such as Vogue, Harper's Bazaar, ELLE, Grazia, Cosmopolitan, Interview, GQ, W, Arena, V, Esquire, Garage, and French Revue des Modes.

Her April 2006 GQ cover was the highest-selling issue of that magazine for the year. It was also one of the all-time best selling issues of the publication. The magazine named her "the world's most voluptuous virgin".

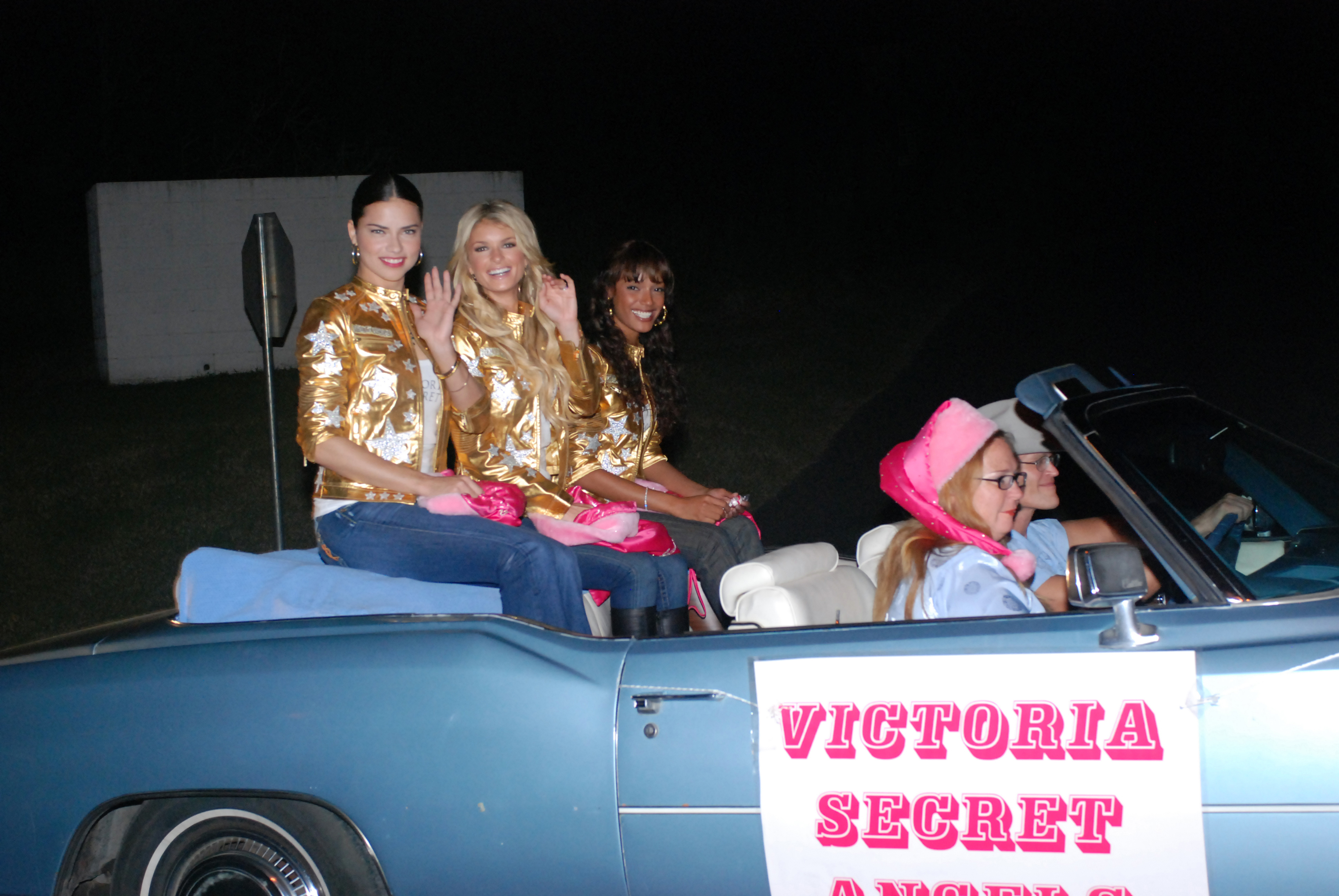
Victoria's Secret Angels Lima (left), Marisa Miller and Selita Ebanks ride in the Guantanamo Bay Christmas Parade on 1 December 2007, in a Cadillac Eldorado.

In 2006, Lima ranked as the fifth highest paid supermodel. Between 2007 and 2008, she ranked as the world's fourth highest paid supermodel by Forbes.

In 2008, she again fronted the cover of GQ, this time attracting a record number of visits to the publication's website. She also appeared in the 2005 Pirelli Calendar and became the face of Italy's cell phone carrier, Telecom Italia Mobile, a move that earned her the nickname, "the Catherine Zeta-Jones of Italy".

In February 2008, Lima was featured on the cover of Esquire, re-creating the classic 1966 Angie Dickinson cover on Esquire's 75th anniversary. She appeared only in shoes, diamonds and gloves for the November 2007 issue of Vanity Fair celebrating 20 years of supermodels with her fellow Victoria's Secret Angels. In February 2008, she was chosen to be the face of Mexico's Liverpool department store chain and launched the partnership with a press conference, runway show, and a summer campaign.

Lima returned to the high fashion runway in 2009, walking for Givenchy. In the same year, after visiting Turkey, she signed a contract with Doritos to appear in print campaigns and television commercials which began airing in Turkey that April. She was also one of the faces of Givenchy for the Fall/Winter 2009 season.

In 2011, Lima signed a deal as a spokeswoman for Megacity by Votsu, a Brazilian social gaming company, to appear in their commercials. Lima has worked with the most established photographers in fashion such as Annie Leibovitz, Juergen Teller, Bruce Weber, J.R. Duran, Paolo Roversi, Inez van Lamsweerde and Vinoodh Matidin, Vincent Peters, Mario Sorrenti, Mert Alas and Marcus Piggott, Steven Meisel, David Sims, and Mario Testino.

She became the face of Donna Karan's spring 2012 advertising campaign, which was accused of having racist undertones due to a photo featuring Lima posing in front of huddled local Haitians.

In early 2012, Turkish clothing company Mavi Jeans hired Lima to be the face and spokesmodel for the brand. In the first quarter of 2012, her advertisement campaign increased sales by 50%. It also provided a 20% increase in stores and online traffic. Furthermore, her television commercial, which was watched by 28 million people, became a trending topic at Twitter and the number of people on Mavi's Facebook page increased by 20%. Store officials at Mavi say the clothing Lima wore in the ad campaigns was met with so much demand that they ran out of stock. Due to her success rate with the company, the European and Russian branch of Mavi decided to make her the global face of the brand.

Lima was photographed by artist Richard Phillips on the famed Copacabana sidewalk in Brazil for Visionaire no. 62 which was released in mid-2012. In an interview, Phillips talks about Lima: "She's so powerful, really an entity, in a way." Then added "You meet her and there's a generosity of spirit and very friendly and easy manner, and then all of sudden, the lights go on, and you realize you're working with this absolutely extraordinary person who's capable of creating these powerful images."

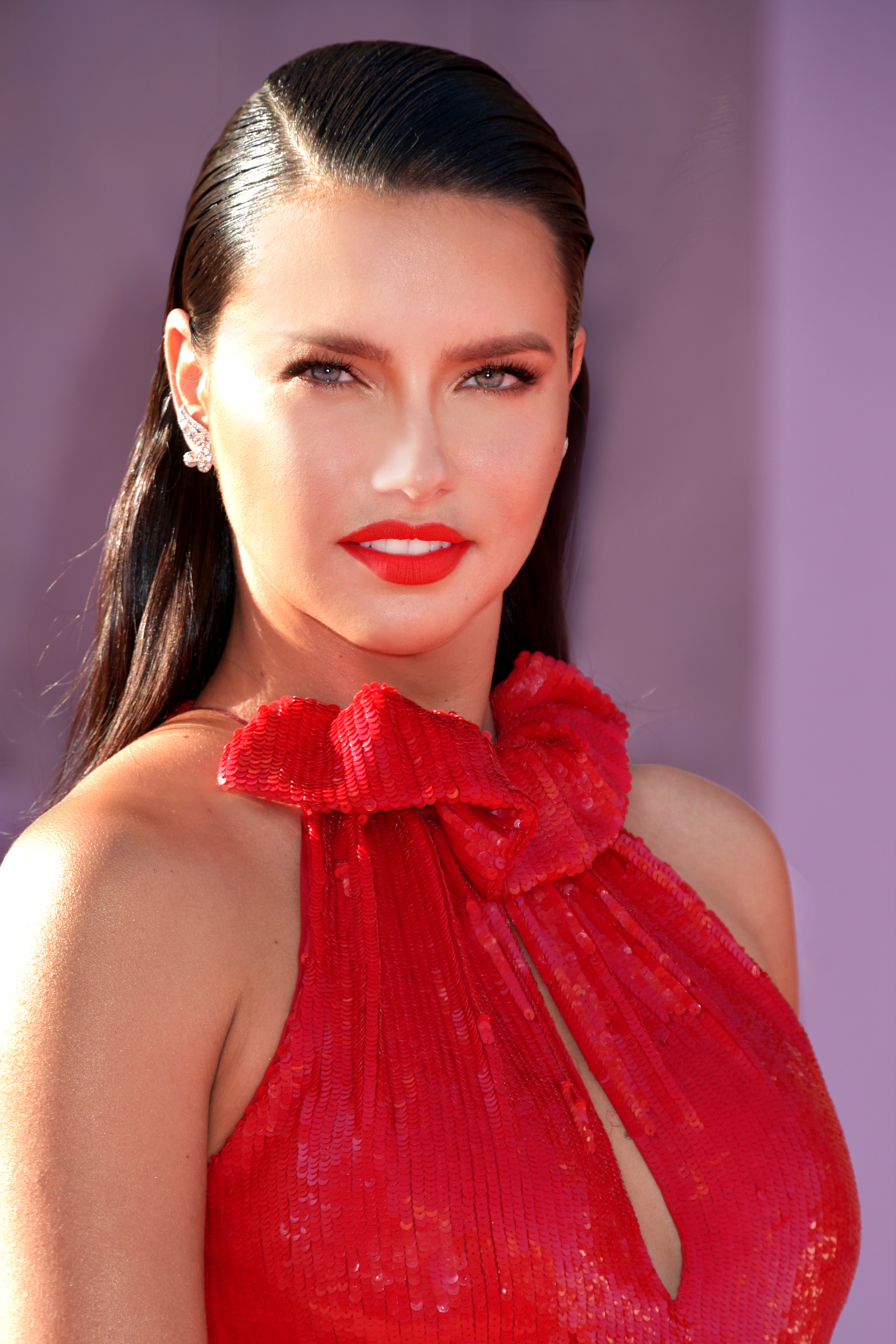
Lima at the movie premiere for Once Upon a Time in Hollywood in July 2019

For the second time, she was featured in the Pirelli calendar by setting a record of being the first pregnant woman to be ever featured in the calendar for the 2013 edition.

In July 2013, Spanish fashion brand Desigual announced that Lima would be the face of the brand during Barcelona Fashion Week Spring-Summer '14, following Bar Refaeli in the same role in January 2013. In April 2014, Lima was chosen as the first brand ambassador of Desigual for the brand's 30th anniversary. She has been named the "ambassador of la vida es Chula," Desigual's "life is cool" motto. Desigual marketing director, Borja Castresana, stated that Adriana "reflects our values and represents Desigual women who are confident, optimistic and full of life". The campaign was launched on April 20, 2014, with television commercials in Spain, France, Germany, Italy, Austria and Belgium.

In 2013, she ranked as the third highest paid supermodel according to Forbes, with earnings of $6 million. In 2014, she ranked as the world's second highest paid supermodel with earnings of $8 million.

In June 2014, she returned to her role as a Maybelline New York spokesmodel. She had been the face of the brand between 2003 and 2009. Lima was also chosen as the new face of Jason Wu Fall/Winter 2014 campaign. Jason Wu stated about Lima, "She's sexy, and there's this feline-esque prowess that felt appropriate for the clothes. And she's got those eyes! She's like our own Bianca Jagger. Adriana is a new take on the supermodel - she's from a different era. At the end of the day, these ads are about the women and the sexiness, and I continue to choose women who inspire me."

In September 2014, Lima starred in a campaign for luxury Swiss watch label IWC alongside Karolina Kurkova.

In 2015, she became the face of Vogue Eyewear and of Marc Jacobs' fragrance Decadence. In the same year, she was ranked as the world's second highest paid supermodel with earnings of $9 million.

In April 2016, Lima became the face of Italian lingerie brand Calzedonia's Swimwear collection. In July 2016, Lima was chosen by NBC alongside fellow Brazilian model Alessandra Ambrosio as the channel's food and culture correspondents for the 2016 Summer Olympics. The NBC feature also showed the duo practicing in the Brazilian martial art Capoeira in the build up to the Olympic games.

In January 2017, Lima starred in the ready-to-wear Spring/Summer 2017 campaign for the Italian brand Sportmax.

In 2018, Lima became a brand ambassador for Puma, and for the Brazilian-based footwear and accessories label Schutz.

In 2019, Lima was the face of Miu Miu cruise campaign, of Chopard Spring/Summer campaign. She was also the face of the Maybelline x Puma collaboration, of the Schutz resort 2019 campaign, and starred in the Palms Casino Resort commercial with others including Cardi B and Rita Ora.

=== Victoria's Secret ===
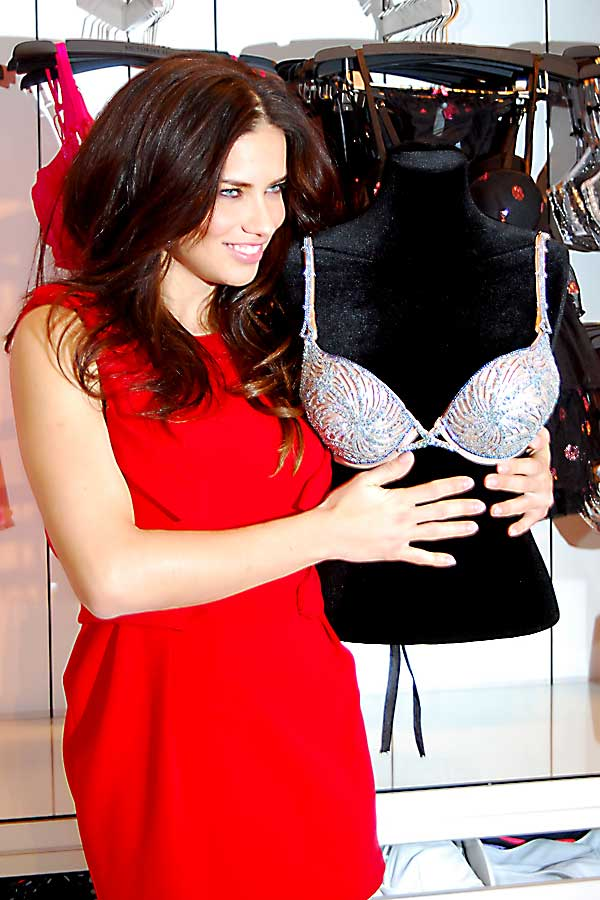
Adriana Lima with the 2010 Fantasy Bra

Lima is known for her work with Victoria's Secret. She walked her first Victoria's Secret runway in 1999 at age 17. Since being contracted as an Angel in 2000, she has appeared on every subsequent show except in 2009, which she missed due to pregnancy. She opened the show in 2003, 2007, 2008, and 2010. In 2012, she opened the show for the 5th time less than two months after giving birth to her second child. Alongside her five show openings, Lima closed the show in 2001, 2002, 2018 during her farewell as an Angel, and again in 2026 after her comeback in 2024.

In 2004, she was one of the five Angels promoting Victoria's Secret nationwide in the so-called "Angels Across America" Tour, alongside Tyra Banks, Heidi Klum, Gisele Bündchen, and Alessandra Ambrosio. Lima has appeared on several television ads for the brand, including the praised and criticized 2004 commercial "Angel in Venice" with Bob Dylan.

2008 continued with Lima hosting the What Is Sexy? program for the E! Entertainment Network and a July tour for the BioFit Uplift Bra launch. She was also featured in November's Miracle Bra relaunch. Topping the year off, Lima wore the "Fantasy Bra" for the 2008 Victoria's Secret Fashion Show. The bra, created by American jewelry designer Martin Katz, was set with 3,575 black diamonds, 117 certified 1 carat (200 mg) white round diamonds, 34 rubies, and two black diamond drops totaling 100 carats (20 g). Valued at over $5 million, the bra carried more than 1,500 carats (300 g).

In 2010, she again wore the Fantasy Bra, called the Victoria's Secret Bombshell Fantasy Bra. The bra, crafted by Damiani, weighed in at 142 carats with 60 carats of white diamonds and 82 carats of topazes and sapphires. It was valued at $2,000,000.

In 2014, she again wore the Fantasy Bra, this time alongside fellow Angel Alessandra Ambrosio. The Dream Angels Fantasy Bra was crafted by Mouawad and featured diamonds, rubies, sapphires, and gemstones, held together with 18-karat gold strings. Both bras were valued at $2,000,000.

In July 2016, Victoria's Secret launched its own sports bra line, Victoria Sport, and Lima starred on the commercial alongside models Elsa Hosk, Romee Strijd, Jasmine Tookes, and Josephine Skriver.

In January 2017, Lima was named "the most valuable Victoria's Secret Angel" according to analytics company D'Marie, which conducted research that factored in social media likes, followers, sales conversions and engagement to come up with the results. "We've developed an algorithm that compiles over 24 specific metrics from each social media platform that determines an individual's ranking amongst others' in any variety of categories," D'Marie explained.

On November 8, 2018, after 18 appearances for the Victoria's Secret Fashion Show, Lima announced on a Facebook post that she would be retiring from the brand, writing: "Dear Victoria, Thank you for showing me the world, sharing your secrets, and most importantly not just giving me wings but teaching me to fly." During the show, Victoria's Secret honored Lima's longevity with the company by giving her a personal tribute segment titled: "Thank You Adriana."

On April 4, 2023, Victoria's Secret announced that Lima would be the face for the relaunch of their fragrance, Heavenly Eau de Parfum, marking her return to the brand. On September 26, 2023, Lima participated in The Tour ’23, the documentary-style reimagining of the Victoria’s Secret Fashion Show.

On October 15, 2024, Lima made a comeback to the Victoria's Secret Fashion Show six years after her retirement.

In 2025, Lima walked for the brand once more, marking her 20th appearance. Shortly after the show, in an Interview article, the creative director Adam Selman referred to her as one of the brand's "contract girls" this year. Selman stated that Victoria’s Secret has a long history of "contract girls," a role historically associated with the Angels, and that the brand now uses the term to describe models signed for year-round campaigns, store appearances, and other promotional work—indicating that Lima was again contracted with the company, though not as an Angel.

As of 2026, Lima continues her work with Victoria's Secret, appearing in year-round campaigns including the "Signature Collection," and the Mother's Day "Modeled After Mom" campaign featuring her daughters Valentina and Sienna. At the Victoria's Secret Fashion Show 2026, Lima was celebrated backstage alongside Alessandra Ambrosio for reaching their milestones, with Lima marking her 21st appearance and Ambrosio her 20th.

=== Acting and hosting ===
Lima's made her acting debut alongside Mickey Rourke and Forest Whitaker, in The Follow (2001), a short film in BMW's series The Hire, opposite Clive Owen and directed by Wong Kar-wai. She also appeared with her fellow Angels in a guest spot playing herself in the CBS comedy series How I Met Your Mother in November 2007, in the episode "The Yips". She also played herself, along with fellow Victoria's Secret Angels, in the 2013 series The Crazy Ones alongside Robin Williams and Sarah Michelle Gellar. In 2008, Lima appeared on the American television series Ugly Betty, where she played herself and made friends with the series' title character, Betty Suarez.

Lima was the host and executive producer of the American reality competition show American Beauty Stars, which premiered on September 23, 2017, on Lifetime.

In 2018, Lima made a cameo appearance as herself in the film Ocean's 8.

=== Super Bowl ads ===
Lima's 2008 solo Victoria's Secret's Super Bowl XLII ad was the single most-seen ad of the game, watched by 103.7 million viewers.

In February 2012, Lima became the only celebrity to ever star in two Super Bowl commercials in one game. She starred in Super Bowl XLVI commercials for online flower service Teleflora and Kia Motors which were watched by more than 200 million viewers. Her Kia Motors Super Bowl commercial – promoting the new Kia Optima – sent sales to their highest mark since the design debuted. Sales were up 31% from January 2012 and 138.6% from February 2012. The commercial was also voted No.3 out of the 55 commercials on USA TODAY and Facebook's Super Bowl Ad Meter. A teaser of the commercial was released in movie theaters in January before the game. It is believed to be the first time a Super Bowl commercial premiered in movie theaters.

Forbes named her Teleflora commercial as one of the best during Super Bowl XLVI, with the comment, "Teleflora... Adriana Lima," Nuff said. Among the many reviews of the commercial, The Huffington Post said: "One of the basic goals of any commercial is to capture the viewer's attention, and by this measure, Teleflora.com's ad featuring supermodel Adriana Lima was most definitely successful." ESPN.com noted: "This actually makes sense when you think about it: Launch your Valentine's Day campaign in the middle of the Super Bowl. That's actually what flower company Teleflora is doing on Sunday. Even smarter? Hire supermodel Adriana Lima to star in it."

=== FIFA Women's World Cup ===
In 2023, Lima was named by FIFA as a Global Fan Ambassador for that year's Women's World Cup, with the aim of "developing, promoting and participating in global initiatives". Lima's appointment was criticised as "tone deaf" by ex-Australia footballer and former FIFA Council member Moya Dodd, who described the supermodel's role as "baffling".

Lima executive produced and appeared in the short documentary film FIFA: A Love Letter To Rwanda, which was directed by Craig Goodwill and follows the March 2023 FIFA congress in Kigali, Rwanda and had its world premiere at the Taormina Film Festival on 28 June 2023.

== Personal life ==
From 2001 to 2003, Lima was in a relationship with American singer Lenny Kravitz. They moved in together and got engaged. Lima was featured on the music video for Kravitz's 2002 single, "Yesterday Is Gone (My Dear Kay)".

From 2003 to 2006, she dated Prince Wenzeslaus of Liechtenstein.

On Valentine's Day 2009, in Jackson Hole, Wyoming, Lima married Serbian NBA player Marko Jarić. In May 2009, it was reported that Lima had applied for Serbian citizenship, but it was never granted to her. Jarić and Lima have two daughters. They were divorced in March 2016.

In 2019 Lima was in relationship with Emir Uyar, a Turkish businessman.

In 2021, Lima started dating film producer Andre Lemmers. In August 2022, Lima gave birth to their son. On 17 December 2024, Lima announced on Instagram that she married Lemmers, writing: "oficcially [sic] Mrs Lima Lemmers".

As of 2025, Lima resides in Los Angeles. She previously owned a house in Miami and an apartment in New York City.

=== Religious views ===
In April 2006, Lima told GQ that she is a devout Roman Catholic who attends Mass every Sunday. She also stated she was a virgin. "Sex is for after marriage," she said. "[Men] have to respect that this is my choice. If there's no respect, that means they don't want me." She also denounced abortion as a crime, and stated that she agrees with all of the Church's teachings. After being criticized for her views on abortion by footballer and former FIFA Council member Moya Dodd, Lima's publicist Laurent Boye released a statement in March 2023 stating: "We can proudly say that Ms Lima has been promoting a healthy lifestyle for several years and like many people, her position on many LGBTQIA+ and women issues has evolved and she is considered an ally," Boye said. However, Lima hasn't issued any official stance on these issues since then.

Lima told Ocean Drive in March 2017 that she always brings a copy of the Bible to read backstage before shows or "going to church every day". She has also stated that, before she became a Victoria's Secret Angel, she had wanted to become a nun. Regarding her spirituality, Lima stated, "The church is in me — I always connect. If you're connected with the divine and always have pure intentions with everything you're doing, you're protected by the angels. I'm very spiritual. I believe in nature, I believe in energy, I believe in spirits." On her social media, Lima often mentions and pays tribute to Yemanjá, a water spirit from the Yoruba religion.

=== Charity work ===
Lima does charitable work helping with an orphanage, "Caminhos da Luz" (Paths of Light), located in Salvador. She helps with construction to expand the orphanage and buys clothes for poor children in Salvador, Bahia. In 2009, she appeared on Var mısın? Yok musun?, the Turkish version of Deal or No Deal, where her prize money went to a hospital in Istanbul for children fighting leukemia.

== Public image ==
Lima was listed in the 2005 Forbes' edition of The World's Best-Paid Celebrities Under 25. She ranked ninety-nine in the 2005 and 2006 Forbes' edition of The Celebrity 100 lists. In 2012, she was listed on Forbes Celebrity 100 power list for earning more than 7 million between May 2011 and May 2012. In 2012, she ranked number eight on Forbes' "The World's Most Powerful Latino Celebrities" list for earning more than 7 million dollars.

Lima was chosen to be a part of People magazine's 100 most beautiful people in the world list, sharing that space with the Angels, with whom she also received a star on the Hollywood "Walk of Fame" prior to the 2007 Victoria's Secret Fashion Show. That same year, she ranked 7th on FHMs "100 Sexiest Women 2007" list.

Lima was also voted on Maxim's "Hot 100" 2007 at the No. 53 spot. She was voted No.1 as the Most Desirable Woman in 2005 by visitors of the men's lifestyle website AskMen.com and placed 4th in 2006 and 2007, 10th in 2008, and 19th in 2009. She received the award for "Hottest Girl on the Planet" in the 2007 Spike Guys' Choice Awards. Since November 2008, Models.com has featured her at number one on the list of the "Sexiest Models". In July 2011, she was ranked No. 4 in the website's "Money Girls" list. The website also lists her on "the Supers" list. The list, which has only 8 supermodels, is about supermodels that transcend the boundaries of the fashion industry and have public recognition in and out of fashion. In 2010, she was voted eighth in "FHM's Sexiest Women in the World". FHM ranked her at No. 6 in 2009, No. 21 in 2008 and No. 4 in 2007.

In 2010, Lima was ranked No. 46 on the 50 most popular women on the Web according to Google search results. A results from a market research study in 2011 about the UEFA Champions League released by Heineken, showed that 52% of men would rather watch their team lift the Champions League trophy than go on a date with Lima. McAfee ranked Lima as the 6th most "dangerous" celebrity in cyberspace in 2010. The ranking, relating to the use of the names of popular celebrities to lure people to websites that are laden with malicious software, ranked Lima number eight in 2011. In 2012, Complex ranked her 4th in the list of "The 100 Hottest Supermodels of All Time".

In a 2011 interview with The Daily Telegraph, prior to the Victoria's Secret Fashion Show, Lima said that for nine days before the show she drinks only protein shakes, and no liquids at all for the last 12 hours "so you dry out, sometimes you can lose up to eight pounds just from that". She also stated that for the last three weeks before the show, she works out twice a day. The interview prompted criticism from the media commentators. Shortly afterwards, Lima defended herself in an interview with E!. "I know it's very intense but ... I just have an athlete's mind and I appreciate doing this thing," she said. "It's not that I do crazy diets throughout the year. I just do it for this particular thing. After this show, I become normal again." The Adriana Lima diet became one of the top five most searched diets on the web in 2012.

On 6 October 2015, it was announced that Adriana would have her own wax figure at the Madame Tussauds New York. She is the first Victoria's Secret Angel and the second Brazilian figure to join the Tussauds star lineup, after soccer star Pelé. Her wax figure was unveiled on 30 November 2015.

In March 2019, she was chosen as the Fashion Icon honoree at The Daily Front Row's Fashion Awards.

In 2021, Lima was chosen by HOLA! USA as one of the "Changemakers" of their "Latina Powerhouse Top 100" list.

In April 2025, she earned the Fashion Comeback of the Year award at The Daily Front Row’s Fashion Awards.

== Filmography ==
Year	Title	Role	Notes
1996	Pista Dupla		TV series
2001	The Hire: The Follow	The Wife	Short film
2007	How I Met Your Mother	Herself	Episode: "The Yips"
2008	Ugly Betty	Herself	Episode: "Ugly Berry"
2013	The Crazy Ones	Herself	Episode: "Models Love Magic"
2018	Ocean's 8	Herself	Cameo
2023	FIFA: A Love Letter To Rwanda	Herself	Short documentary film; also executive producer

== Music video ==
Year	Title	Artist
2002	Yesterday Is Gone (My Dear Kay)	Lenny Kravitz
2025	What You Saying	Lil Uzi Vert
