= The Killer (2023 film) =

2023 film by David Fincher

- Release poster
- Directed by: David Fincher
- Screenplay by: Andrew Kevin Walker
- Based on: The Killer by: Alexis "Matz" Nolent; Luc Jacamon
- Produced by: William Doyle; Peter Mavromates; Ceán Chaffin
- Starring: Michael Fassbender; Arliss Howard; Charles Parnell; Kerry O'Malley; Sala Baker; Sophie Charlotte; Tilda Swinton
- Cinematography: Erik Messerschmidt
- Edited by: Kirk Baxter
- Music by: Trent Reznor; Atticus Ross
- Production companies: Netflix Studios; Plan B Entertainment; Boom! Studios; Panic Pictures (II)
- Distributed by: Netflix
- Release dates: September 3, 2023 (Venice); October 27, 2023 (United States); November 10, 2023 (Netflix)
- Running time: 118 minutes
- Country: United States
- Language: English
- Box office: $452,208

The Killer is a 2023 American action thriller film directed by David Fincher from a screenplay by Andrew Kevin Walker. It is based on the French graphic novel series The Killer written by Alexis "Matz" Nolent and illustrated by Luc Jacamon. The film stars Michael Fassbender in the main role alongside Arliss Howard, Charles Parnell, Kerry O'Malley, Sala Baker, Sophie Charlotte, and Tilda Swinton in supporting roles. In the film, Fassbender plays an assassin who embarks on an international vendetta after a hit goes wrong.

Development on the graphic novel adaptation began in November 2007, when Fincher was reported to direct the film with Alessandro Camon writing the script, and Paramount Pictures and Plan B Entertainment, respectively, were hired to distribute and produce the film. By February 2021, Fincher moved the project over to Netflix with Walker replacing Camon as writer and Fassbender circling the lead role. Swinton joined the cast that October, with filming beginning the following month, and wrapped March 2022. Filming locations included Paris, Dominican Republic, and several places in the United States.

The Killer premiered at the 80th Venice International Film Festival on September 3, 2023. The film received a limited theatrical release on October 27 before streaming on Netflix on November 10. The film received positive reviews from critics.

== Plot ==
A professional hitman known only as the Killer stakes out a Parisian hotel room. He prepares to use a sniper rifle to kill a target who will check into the hotel room at an unknown time. While waiting for the target, he eats, practices yoga, listens to music (exclusively the Smiths), and talks on the phone with his handler, Eddie Hodges, who is an attorney and his former university law professor. After the target arrives with a dominatrix and sits down, the Killer carefully aims at the target's head and shoots, but the dominatrix unknowingly gets in the way of the bullet and the Killer accidentally shoots her instead, while the target is unharmed. The Killer flees, evading the police and disposing of his equipment.

The Killer then flies to the Dominican Republic via Miami, but gets delayed: he becomes suspicious of another airline passenger, and reschedules the second leg of his flight. He returns to his house in the Dominican Republic to find it has been broken into and his girlfriend Magdala attacked. She is in the ICU of a hospital, with her brother Marcus watching over her. Marcus says that Magdala was interrogated and tortured by two assassins but managed to injure one of them and escape. The Killer tracks down Leo, the taxi driver who drove the assassins to the Killer's home. Leo identifies one of the assassins, a strong man with a limp leg, nicknamed "The Brute", and a woman who resembles a Q-Tip, known as "The Expert". The Killer shoots Leo dead and seeks to track down the assassins.

The Killer travels to Hodges' office in New Orleans and enters the building disguised as a maintenance person. After forcing Dolores, Hodges' secretary, to restrain her boss and herself, the Killer destroys their electronics. As Hodges attempts to talk the Killer into leaving, the Killer shoots him in the chest with a nail gun to torture the names of the hitmen out of him. However, Hodges doesn't reveal the information and dies more quickly than the Killer anticipated. Dolores offers to show the Killer the assassins' identities in her paper files in her home, asking in return that the Killer give her a non-suspicious death so her children can claim a life insurance payout. After receiving the names at her home, the Killer breaks his rule not to show empathy; he snaps her neck and shoves her down a flight of stairs, making her death look like an accident, as she had requested. He then disposes of Hodges' body.

The Killer drives to St. Petersburg, Florida, where he finds the Brute, whom he identifies by his limp. At night, he breaks into the Brute's home to kill him, but he is blindsided and tackled. A fight ensues, during which the Brute realizes who the Killer is before the Killer fatally shoots him and sets his house on fire with a Molotov cocktail.

The Killer then travels to Beacon, New York, and confronts the Expert at a gourmet restaurant. Appearing to accept her fate, the Expert offers to share with him a "last supper" of whiskey, during which she questions the Killer's motivations. They leave the restaurant and go to a park. After the Expert appears to slip down a small flight of ice-covered stairs, she asks the Killer to help her up, but the Killer shoots her dead, revealing that she was concealing a knife.

The Killer travels to Chicago, to kill billionaire venture capitalist Henderson "Clay" Claybourne, the client from the botched assassination. The Killer reflects during his flight that police take more interest in the deaths of rich people. He uses tools bought on Amazon to enter Claybourne's penthouse. Confronting him, the Killer remains mostly silent. Claybourne says that he has no personal problem with the Killer and, as a first-time client of a hitman, agreed to pay Hodges extra money for "the trail to be scrubbed" when the assassination attempt went awry. The Killer spares Claybourne, but he promises him a slow death if Claybourne ever targets him again. The Killer returns to the Dominican Republic and sits next to a recovering Magdala.

== Cast ==
- Michael Fassbender as The Killer, a professional assassin
- Tilda Swinton as The Expert, a fellow assassin living in New York
- Charles Parnell as The Lawyer, Eddie Hodges, The Killer's handler posing as a lawyer
- Arliss Howard as The Client, Henderson "Clay" Claybourne, a billionaire businessman
- Kerry O'Malley as Dolores, an office administrator working for Hodges
- Sophie Charlotte as Magdala, The Killer's girlfriend
- Emiliano Pernía as Marcus, Magdala's brother
- Gabriel Polanco as Leo, The Taxi Driver
- Monique Ganderton as The Dominatrix
- Daran Norris as The Deep South Lounge Greeter
- Jack Kesy as The Salesman
- Sala Baker as The Brute

== Production ==
=== Development ===
In November 2007, it was reported that David Fincher would be directing an adaptation of the Matz French comic book The Killer, with Alesandro Camon writing the script, Brad Pitt's Plan B Entertainment producing, and Paramount Pictures distributing. By February 2021, Fincher had taken the project to Netflix, where he had signed an overall deal, with Andrew Kevin Walker now writing the script and Michael Fassbender circling the lead role. By June, it was reported that Fincher was planning to begin filming in November 2021 in Paris, with cinematographer Erik Messerschmidt. Tilda Swinton joined the cast in October.

David Fincher cited Jean-Pierre Melville’s Le Samouraï as the most obvious reference to his film. Michael Fassbender is inspired by the character played by Alain Delon.

=== Filming ===
Principal photography began in November 2021 in Paris. It continued in the Dominican Republic in December 2021, then moved to New Orleans later that month. It moved again to Chicago in February 2022, and then to St. Charles, Illinois (doubling for Beacon, New York), in March 2022 for ten days, wrapping up later that month.

=== Music ===
In February 2023, it was reported that Trent Reznor and Atticus Ross were composing for the film. The film also includes the following songs from English rock band the Smiths (in order in which they appear in the film):

No.	Title	Length
1.	"Well I Wonder"	3:59
2.	"I Know It's Over"	5:49
3.	"How Soon Is Now?"	6:48
4.	"Hand in Glove"	3:23
5.	"Bigmouth Strikes Again"	3:13
6.	"Heaven Knows I'm Miserable Now"	3:36
7.	"Girlfriend in a Coma"	2:03
8.	"Shoplifters of the World Unite"	2:58
9.	"Unhappy Birthday"	2:45
10.	"This Charming Man"	2:43
11.	"There Is a Light That Never Goes Out"	4:05
Total length:		41:22

== Release and reception ==
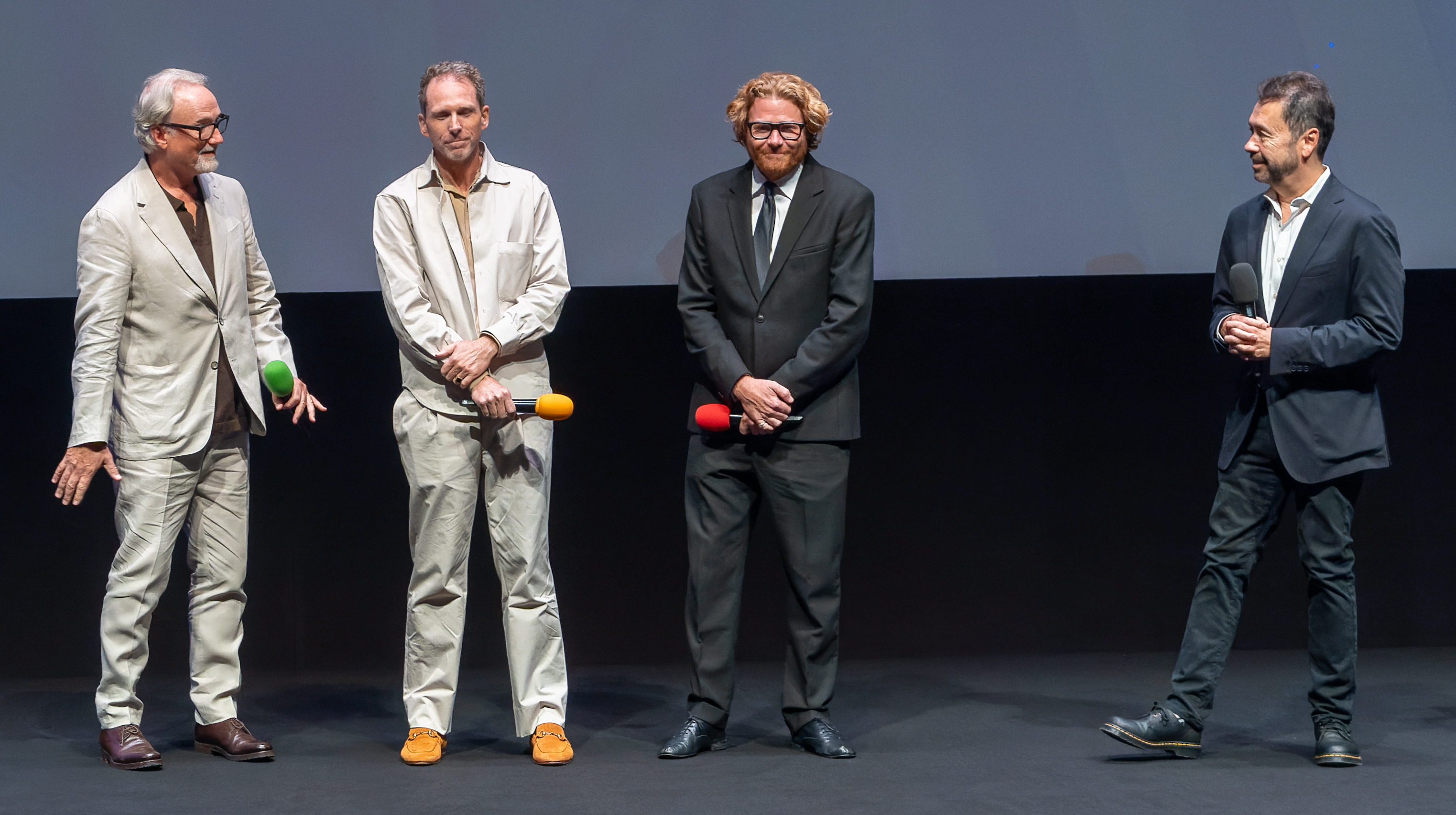
Fincher, editor Kirk Baxter, cinematographer Erik Messerschmidt, and sound designer Ren Klyce at the 2023 BFI London Film Festival.

The Killer premiered in-competition at the 80th Venice International Film Festival on September 3, 2023. It had a surprise screening at the 71st San Sebastián International Film Festival on September 30, 2023. It was also screened at the 28th Busan International Film Festival in the "Icon" section on October 6, 2023.

The film began a limited theatrical release on October 27, 2023, via Netflix, before streaming on the platform on November 10, 2023.

=== Critical response ===
On the review aggregator website Rotten Tomatoes, 85% of 288 critics' reviews are positive, with an average rating of 7.4/10. The website's consensus reads: "The Killer finds director David Fincher on firm footing with a stylish and engaging thriller that proves a perfect match for leading man Michael Fassbender." Metacritic, which uses a weighted average, assigned the film a score of 73 out of 100, based on 59 critics, indicating "generally favorable" reviews.

Terming it a "horribly addictive samurai procedural," Peter Bradshaw of The Guardian wrote that the film is "entertainingly absurd and yet the pure conviction and deadpan focus that Fassbender and Fincher bring to this ballet of anonymous professionalism makes it very enjoyable." Ryan Lattanzio of IndieWire found it "as unfeeling as any Fincher thriller, at once predictable in its simplicity but also strangely daring because of it". Time magazine's Stephanie Zacharek, noting the proliferation of thrillers about contract assassins, praised Fincher for simplifying his entry into the subgenre to its essence, which Zacharek felt expanded its possibilities rather than limiting them, especially with Fassbender's performance effectively realizing them.

The New York Times was less positive, with Manohla Dargis unmoved by character and plot but nonetheless impressed by the talents of Fincher and Fassbender. "The character is boring and so is this movie, but like the supremely skilled Fincher, who can't help but make images that hold your gaze even as your mind wanders, Fassbender does keep you watching."

== Accolades ==
Year	Award / Film Festival	Category	Recipient(s)	Result	Ref.
Venice International Film Festival	September 9, 2023	Golden Lion	David Fincher	Nominated	
Venice International Film Festival	September 9, 2023	Premio Soundtrack Stars Award — Special Mention	Trent Reznor and Atticus Ross	Won	
Hollywood Music in Media Awards	November 15, 2023	Original Score — Feature Film	Trent Reznor and Atticus Ross	Nominated	
Las Vegas Film Critics Society	December 13, 2023	Best Picture	The Killer	Nominated	
Las Vegas Film Critics Society	December 13, 2023	Best Score	Trent Reznor, Atticus Ross	Nominated	
Las Vegas Film Critics Society	December 13, 2023	Best Stunts	The Killer	Nominated	
Indiana Film Journalists Association	December 17, 2023	Best Film	The Killer	Longlisted	
Indiana Film Journalists Association	December 17, 2023	Best Director	David Fincher	Nominated	
Indiana Film Journalists Association	December 17, 2023	Best Editing	Kirk Baxter	Nominated	
Indiana Film Journalists Association	December 17, 2023	Best Cinematography	Erik Messerschmidt	Nominated	
Indiana Film Journalists Association	December 17, 2023	Best Musical Score	Trent Reznor, Atticus Ross	Nominated	
Golden Reel Awards	March 3, 2024	Outstanding Achievement in Sound Editing – Feature Effects / Foley	Ren Klyce, Jonathon Stevens, Malcolm Fife, Jeremy Molod, Thom Brennan, Dee Selby, Shelley Roden, John Roesch	Nominated	
Critics' Choice Super Awards	April 4, 2024	Best Actor in a Superhero Movie	Michael Fassbender	Won	
