= The Killer (comics) =

1998 French comic by Matz and Luc Jacamon

- Cover of Volume One

Publication information
- Publisher: Casterman; Archaia Studios Press
- Format: Limited series
- Genre: Crime
- Publication date: October 1998

Creative team
- Created by: Matz; Luc Jacamon
- Written by: Matz
- Artist: Luc Jacamon
- Letterer: Luc Jacamon
- Colourist: Luc Jacamon

Collected editions
- Volume One: ISBN 978-1-932386-44-8

The Killer (Le Tueur) is a French comic book by writer Matz and artist Luc Jacamon which follows the life of an initially unnamed male contract killing assassin.

== Publication history ==
The series was published in 13 albums by Casterman. It was translated into English and published by Archaia Studios Press, who turned each album into two comic books.

== Publications ==
The French albums from Casterman are:

- Long feu (October 1998)
- L'engrenage (April 2000)
- La dette (August 2001)
- Les liens du sang (August 2002)
- La mort dans l'âme (October 2003)
- Modus Vivendi (September 2007)
- Le commun des mortels (August 2009)
- L'ordre naturel des choses (June 2010)
- Concurrence déloyale (March 2011)
- Le cœur à l'ouvrage (January 2012)
- La suite dans les idées (January 2013)
- La main qui nourrit (November 2013)
- Lignes de fuite (September 2014)

A sequel series (Le Tueur - Affaires d'état) from the same publisher contains the following albums:

- Traitement négatif (January 2020)
- Circuit court (October 2020)
- Variable d'ajustement (October 2021)
- Frères humains (September 2022)
- La face cachée de l'abîme (October 2023)

=== Collected editions ===
Volume One (collects The Killer #1-4: "Long Fire" and "Vicious Cycle", hardcover, 128 pages, September 2007, ISBN 1-932386-44-0)

Volume Two (collects The Killer #5-10: "The Debt", "Blood Ties", and "The Killer Instinct", hardcover, 176 pages, March 2010, ISBN 1-932386-56-4)

Volume Three (collects: "Modus Vivendi", "Ordinary Mortals" and "The Natural Order Of Things", hardcover, 176 pages, February 2011, ISBN 978-1-936393-03-9)

Volume Four (collects: "Unfair Competition", and "Putting Your Heart In It", hardcover, 128 pages, April 2013, ISBN 1-936393-69-7)

Volume Five (collects: "One Track Mind", “The Hand That Feeds”, and "Lines of Flight", hardcover, 176 pages, February 2017, ISBN 978-1608867684)

Affairs of the State (collects: Affairs of the State #1-6: "Negative treatment", "Short circuit", and "Adjustment variable", hardcover, 176 pages, December 2022, ISBN 978-1684158584)

== Awards ==
The Volume One collected edition won "Best Indy Book" in IGN's Best of 2007. The edition also won "Best Comic You Didn't Read This Year" from Newsarama and was nominated for "Best U.S. Edition of International Material" in the 2008 Eisner Awards.

== Film adaptation ==
Development on the film adaptation began in 2007 at Paramount Pictures and Plan B Entertainment, with David Fincher signed on as director and Alessandro Camon as screenwriter. In 2021, Fincher later moved the project over to Netflix with Andrew Kevin Walker replacing Camon as writer and Michael Fassbender in the lead role. The film began a limited theatrical release on 27 October 2023 via Netflix, before streaming on the platform on 10 November 2023.
