= Bullet to the Head =

2012 American film, director Walter Hill

- Theatrical release poster
- Directed by: Walter Hill
- Written by: Alessandro Camon
- Based on: Du plomb dans la tête by Matz
- Produced by: Alexandra Milchan; Alfred Gough; Miles Millar; Courtney Solomon; Kevin King-Templeton
- Starring: Sylvester Stallone; Sung Kang; Sarah Shahi; Adewale Akinnuoye-Agbaje; Christian Slater; Jason Momoa
- Cinematography: Lloyd Ahern II
- Edited by: Tim Alverson
- Music by: Steve Mazzaro
- Production companies: Dark Castle Entertainment; IM Global; Millar Gough Ink; Emjag; After Dark Films
- Distributed by: Warner Bros. Pictures
- Release dates: November 14, 2012 (Rome Film Festival); February 1, 2013 (United States)
- Running time: 91 minutes
- Country: United States
- Language: English
- Budget: $55 million
- Box office: $22.6 million

Bullet to the Head is a 2012 American action film directed by Walter Hill. The screenplay by Alessandro Camon was based on the French graphic novel Du plomb dans la tête written by Matz and illustrated by Colin Wilson. The film stars Sylvester Stallone, Sung Kang, Sarah Shahi, Adewale Akinnuoye-Agbaje, Christian Slater, and Jason Momoa. Alexandra Milchan, Alfred Gough, Miles Millar, and Kevin King-Templeton produced the film. The movie follows a hitman (Stallone) and a cop (Kang) who are forced to work together to bring down a corrupt businessman (Akinnuoye-Agbaje) after they are targeted by the businessman's assassin (Momoa). The film had an exclusive test screening at the International Rome Film Festival on November 14, 2012, and was officially released in American theatres on February 1, 2013. The film received mixed reviews and was a box office bomb.

== Plot ==
In New Orleans, hitman Jimmy Bobo and his partner Louis Blanchard kill a corrupt former WDCPD policeman, Hank Greely. Decompressing at a bar, Blanchard is murdered by another hitman, Keegan, whose attempt to also kill Bobo fails.

WDCPD Detective Taylor Kwon arrives to investigate Greely's death. Meanwhile, Keegan meets with his employer, Robert Morel, and Morel's lawyer Marcus Baptiste. Baptiste reveals that Greely tried to blackmail Morel, and provided local mobster Baby Jack with a file detailing Morel's illegal operations. Keegan kills Baby Jack and his men and retrieves the file.

Kwon meets Bobo but is attacked by corrupt cops ordered by Morel to prevent Kwon from investigating Greely. He is shot before Bobo rescues him. Using Kwon's intel, they go to a Turkish bathhouse, where Bobo interrogates Ronnie Earl, the middleman who hired Bobo and Blanchard on Morel's behalf. Ronnie tries to kill Bobo, but Bobo kills him after a struggle. When his gun jams, nearly causing his death, Bobo angrily confronts Kwon, who admits to having tampered with Bobo's gun, not trusting him. The two decide to put aside their differences and work together.

Bobo and Kwon kidnap Baptiste and take him to Bobo's secret boathouse, where he is forced to hand over a flash drive detailing an extensive corruption scheme put in place by Morel to replace low-rent housing projects with luxury condominiums. He reveals that Keegan is an ex-mercenary. Bobo kills Baptiste just as Keegan and his men attack. Bobo and Kwon escape, and Bobo detonates a bomb, killing Keegan's men. Angered at Bobo's methods, Kwon abandons him and meets with Lieutenant Lebreton to ask for his help. When Lebreton tries to kill him, as he is also on Morel's payroll, Bobo saves Kwon again.

Morel has Bobo's adult daughter, Lisa, kidnapped and offers to trade her for the flash drive. Keegan becomes furious when Bobo is safely allowed to leave with Lisa; he kills Morel before confronting Bobo. This culminates in an intense axe fight until Bobo stabs Keegan, and Kwon shoots him dead.

Kwon retrieves the flash drive, and Bobo shoots him in the shoulder to make it appear as if Kwon failed to capture him. He suggests that Kwon blame him for all of Morel's gangsters shot by Kwon in the struggle.

Six weeks later, Kwon meets with Bobo and tells him that he did not, in fact, mention Bobo's involvement to the police, but that if Bobo continues in this business, Kwon will take him down. Bobo welcomes him to try.

== Cast ==
- Sylvester Stallone as James "Jimmy Bobo" Bonomo
- Sung Kang as Detective Taylor Kwon
- Sarah Shahi as Lisa Bonomo
- Adewale Akinnuoye-Agbaje as Robert Nkomo Morel
- Christian Slater as Marcus Baptiste
- Jason Momoa as Keegan
- Jon Seda as Louie Blanchard
- Weronika Rosati as Lola

In addition, Holt McCallany appears briefly as Hank Greely, Brian Van Holt as Ronnie "Cowboy Ronnie" Earl, while Dane Rhodes and Marcus Lyle Brown play crooked cops Lieutenant Lebreton and Detective Towne, respectively.

== Production ==
=== Development ===
The film is based on Alexis Nolent's French graphic novel Du Plomb Dans La Tête ("Lead in the Head"), with a screenplay by Alessandro Camon under the working title "Headshot". The producing team previously produced the film I Am Number Four. An executive attached to the film has said, "[This movie] is exactly the type of fast-paced, universally themed project that suits our business model. Sylvester Stallone is an international icon and we're really excited to be in business with him."

Originally Wayne Kramer was attached to direct, but left the project when his vision of the film was darker than Stallone wanted. Sylvester Stallone then called Walter Hill who had just had a movie fall apart six weeks before that he had been trying to do for a year. Hill later recalled:

When Sly and I first talked about doing it, I told him I thought if we did it as an homage to ’70s or ’80s action films – and if he got a haircut and if we played it not at some nuclear level and left a little room for humor – everything would probably work out. I mean, this is one of those plots... You know, in terms of the real world, they’re fairly preposterous. But that's OK. That's part of the given. As long as you don't break the rules and contradict yourself within that sensibility, people go for the ride.... Sly and I have known each other for probably 35 years. I have always been a great admirer of Sly's. Most directors love movie stars because they’re such fabulous tools to tell stories with. Sly is an actor but he's a star and he's been a star for a very long time. When he sent me this, there was a feeling on both our parts, that if this was ever going to happen – us working together – we better sit down and do it. Time is moving on.

=== Casting ===
Thomas Jane was originally cast for the part that would eventually go to Sung Kang. The role was recast at the insistence of producer Joel Silver, stating a need for a "more 'ethnic' actor" to appeal to a wider audience. Hill stated:

The real truth is these movies are all foreign driven. They need domestic releases. If the economics are right, people feel like they can be commercial in a reasonable way domestically. But they’re really foreign driven. This movie would not exist without expectation of the foreign audience being vastly greater than the domestic.

Hill said he wanted to have fun with the genre:

We’re not breaking new ground. We’re trying to be entertaining within a format that's familiar. There's a kind of ice skating that goes on where you must let the audience know that you're not taking yourself too seriously. But at the same time, the jokes are funny but the bullets are real. The jeopardy has to be real. When it gets outlandish, there needs to be no drift into parody – self-parody, maybe inevitable for old directors.

Hill said the film would be called a "buddy movie" but that he made "anti-buddy movies":

They don't like each other. They’re not going to like each other. The most they’re going to achieve by the end is a kind of grudging respect. I'm just comfortable with that. It seems to be an inherently more dramatic situation than if they’re friendly and they get along and respect each other. Also, frankly, it gives you better avenue to work in humor. These things have to be leavened with humor. It actually reinforces the action.

=== Filming ===
Bullet to the Head was shot in New Orleans and started filming on June 27, 2011. Hill:

One of the things I like about New Orleans is it feels like you're in a western with the architecture. All the balconies, the old buildings, it feels like you're in the 1880s. Some of it spills into the movie. I don't know how much of it creeps into the edges and helps you or how much of it is just by design. Usually you're trying to tell a narrative through your characters and have all this stuff bleed in around the edges.

Hill said he told Stallone "to play things more casually. I wanted him to play his natural personality as much as possible. He's a very engaging guy. I told him, “I'm not interested in you inventing a character as much as imagining yourself as character.” He went right with that."

== Music ==
Bullet to the Head: Original Motion Picture Soundtrack

Soundtrack album
- Released: 2013
- Genre: Soundtrack
- Label: Varèse Sarabande (USA)
- Producer: Hans Zimmer

The soundtrack album was released digitally on January 29, 2013 and in stores on February 19. The album features the film's score, consisting of 15 tracks composed by Steve Mazzaro and produced by Hans Zimmer.

== Release ==
The film had an exclusive test screening at the International Rome Film Festival on November 14, 2012.

=== Theatrical ===
On August 23, 2011, it was announced that the film would be released on April 13, 2012. On February 23, 2012, the release date was pushed back to February 1, 2013.

=== Home media ===
Bullet to the Head was released on DVD and Blu-ray in the United Kingdom on June 3, 2013 and United States on July 16, 2013 by Warner Home Video.

== Reception ==
=== Box office ===
Bullet to the Head made $4.5 million for its opening weekend, Sylvester Stallone's worst opening weekend gross in 32 years. Over its entire run, the film grossed $9.5 million in the United States and Canada, and $13.1 million in other territories, for a worldwide total of $22.6 million, against a budget of $55 million.

=== Critical response ===
On the review aggregator website Rotten Tomatoes, 44% of 145 critics' reviews are positive, with an average rating of 5.1/10. The website's consensus reads: "Bullet to the Head's unapologetically trashy thrills evoke memories of its star and director's proud cinematic pasts -- but sadly, those memories are just about all it has to offer." Metacritic, which uses a weighted average, assigned the film a score of 48 out of 100, based on 34 critics, indicating "mixed or average" reviews. Jay Weissberg of Variety called it "a kickass actioner driven by personality rather than plot".

=== Accolades ===
Stallone was nominated for a Razzie Award for Worst Actor for his performances in this film, Escape Plan and Grudge Match, which he lost to Jaden Smith for After Earth.
