= Mark Sandau =

Mark Sandau (born June 13, 1967) is a creative director and entrepreneur. He received a BFA from the Minneapolis College of Art and Design (MCAD) in 1991. He is the founder of Sandau Co located in Minneapolis, Minnesota. He was formerly a partner at Ditch Creative Inc., also in Minneapolis.

== Career ==
Sandau has worked for CKS Group in Cupertino, California, Carmichael Lynch, Olson, McKinney in Durham, North Carolina,Fallon McElligott and Duffy Design in Minneapolis. While at Fallon he worked on both seasons of BMW's ground-breaking digital film series, The Hire. He is also the author of Atom and the Time Capsule.

Throughout his early career, Sandau has worked closely with software company Macromedia, often working with Adobe Flash and Director.

== Recognition ==
Sandau received The One Club's Best of the Digital Decade award in 2010 for his work while at Fallon, a 2003 Apple Design Award for Best QuickTime Content, and is credited in the Clio Awards. Other recognition includes 13 awards from the One Club, including two Best In Show.

Mark Sandau's work has been featured in a number of publications, including articles in Communication Arts (CA) and Adweek about design and advertising. He has been quoted in books such as How to Catch the Big Idea: The Strategies of the Top-Creatives by Ralf Langwost. Sandau has also been a guest speaker for Macromedia and at Apple’s Worldwide Developers Conference (WWDC). His design, creative, and development work has earned him 16 awards from AdFed Minnesota and recognition from organizations like the Minneapolis chapter of the American Institute of Graphic Arts (AIGA), and he is a British Design & Art Direction (D&AD) Pencil recipient.

== See also ==
- David Latimer
