= Harris Savides =

American cinematographer

- Savides in 2008
- Born: September 28, 1957; New York City, New York, U.S.
- Died: October 9, 2012 (aged 55); New York City, New York, U.S.
- Education: School of Visual Arts
- Occupation: Cinematographer
- Years active: 1980–2012

Harris Savides ASC (/səˈviːdɪs/; Greek: Χάρης Σαββίδης; September 28, 1957 – October 9, 2012) was an American cinematographer.

He was nominated for the BAFTA Award for Best Cinematography for the Ridley Scott crime thriller American Gangster (2007).

== Early life ==
Savides was born in New York City, to parents of Greek Cypriot origin, Eleni, a clerical worker, and Savas Savides, a short-order cook.

He graduated with a degree in photography and film from the School of Visual Arts.

== Career ==
Savides started as a key grip in the documentary Fist of Fear, Touch of Death from the 1980.

On TV, Savides served as a cinematographer on a short film entitled The Investigator (1994) directed by Matthew Tabak and a TV movie Lake Consequence (1993) directed by Rafael Eisenman.

His first solo job as a cinematographer was on the thriller Heaven's Prisoners (1996).

Savides was a frequent collaborator of Gus Van Sant, working in six of his films.

After working in the opening title sequence of Seven, Savides worked two more times with David Fincher, in The Game and Zodiac, which the latter was shot mostly with digital cameras.

Savides worked on a short film directed by Wong Kar Wai for BMW's "The Hire" film series, entitled The Follow. Savides also worked on Martin Scorsese's champagne commercial The Key to Reserva, an homage to Alfred Hitchcock.

With director John Hillcoat, Savides worked in a series of Levi's commercials for their "To Work" advertising campaign.

In 2010, Savides was attached to Stephen Daldry's Extremely Loud & Incredibly Close, but dropped out after the diagnosis of his brain cancer was made. He was then replaced by Chris Menges

Savides also worked on two films directed by Sofia Coppola, with The Bling Ring his final project before his death.

=== Music videos ===
Savides was the cinematographer on a number of well-known music videos directed by Mark Romanek, including Michael Jackson's "Scream", Madonna's "Rain" and "Bedtime Story", Fiona Apple's "Criminal", and Nine Inch Nails' "Closer."

He has also served as cinematographer on the music videos for The Rolling Stones' "Like A Rolling Stone", Chris Isaak's "Blue Spanish Sky", and R.E.M.'s "Everybody Hurts".

Savides is the only person to date that has won three MTV Video Music Awards for Best Cinematography in a Music Video (for Madonna's "Rain", Fiona Apple's "Criminal" and R.E.M.'s "Everybody Hurts") and the only person to win two in a row (for "Rain" by Madonna and "Everybody Hurts" by R.E.M.)

== Style ==
Savides was known for the very delicate images that he created for The Yards and Birth. In both instances he underexposed the filmstock by several stops in order to break up the colors and give the blacks a purplish and brownish tint. This non-conventional approach leads to a look that resembles the paintings of Georges de La Tour and Caravaggio.

For the visual style of Somewhere, Sofia Coppola discussed Bruce Weber's Hollywood portraits and Helmut Newton's of models at the Chateau Marmont, and Jeanne Dielman, 23 quai du Commerce, 1080 Bruxelles (1975), the film by Chantal Akerman about the routine of a Belgian housewife, with Savides. Savides said, "The main thing was to tell the story really simply and let it play out in long beats and have the audience discover the moment." Coppola used the lenses that her father had filmed Rumble Fish (1983) with in an effort to give the film a more period look, although it is set in the present.

== Personal life and death ==
Savides lived in Manhattan with his wife Medine, and daughter Sophie.

He died from brain cancer at age 55.

== Filmography ==
TV movies

Year	Title	Director
1993	Lake Consequence	Rafael Eisenman
1994	The Investigator	Matthew Tabak

Feature film

Year	Title	Director
1996	Heaven's Prisoners	Phil Joanou
1997	The Game	David Fincher
1998	Illuminata	John Turturro
2000	The Yards	James Gray
2000	Finding Forrester	Gus Van Sant
2002	Gerry	Gus Van Sant
2003	Elephant	Gus Van Sant
2004	Birth	Jonathan Glazer
2005	Last Days	Gus Van Sant
2007	Zodiac	David Fincher
2007	Margot at the Wedding	Noah Baumbach
2007	American Gangster	Ridley Scott
2008	Milk	Gus Van Sant
2009	Whatever Works	Woody Allen
2010	Greenberg	Noah Baumbach
2010	Somewhere	Sofia Coppola
2011	Restless	Gus Van Sant
2013	The Bling Ring*	Sofia Coppola

* Posthumous release (Shared credit with Christopher Blauvelt)

Short film

Year	Title	Director	Notes
2001	The Follow	Wong Kar-wai	Segment of The Hire
2007	The Key to Reserva	Martin Scorsese	

Music video

Year	Title	Artist	Director
1990	"Something New"	Grand Daddy I.U.	Barry Michael Cooper
1990	"I Go to Extremes"	Billy Joel	Paula Greif
1991	"Blue Spanish Sky"	Chris Isaak	Bruce Weber
1992	"Goin' Out West"	Tom Waits	Jesse Dylan
1992	"Sometimes Salvation"	The Black Crowes	Stephane Sednaoui
1992	"What You Do to Me"	Teenage Fanclub	Mark Romanek
1992	"Wicked as It Seems"	Keith Richards	Mark Romanek
1993	"Everybody Hurts"	R.E.M.	Jake Scott
1993	"Rain"	Madonna	Mark Romanek
1993	"Jump They Say"	David Bowie	Mark Romanek
1994	"Closer"	Nine Inch Nails	Mark Romanek
1994	"Take a Bow"	Madonna	Michael Haussman
1995	"Violet"	Hole	Mark Seliger; Fred Woodward
1995	"Bedtime Story"	Madonna	Mark Romanek
1995	"Human Nature"	Madonna	Jean-Baptiste Mondino
1995	"Scream"	Michael Jackson; Janet Jackson	Mark Romanek
1995	"Like a Rolling Stone"	The Rolling Stones	Michel Gondry
1996	"Little Trouble Girl"	Sonic Youth	Mark Romanek
1996	"Twenty Foreplay"	Janet Jackson	Keir McFarlane
1996	"Let It Flow"	Toni Braxton	Herb Ritts
1997	"Criminal"	Fiona Apple	Mark Romanek
1998	"Weird"	Hanson	Gus Van Sant
1998	"If You Can't Say No"	Lenny Kravitz	Mark Romanek
1999	"I Try"	Macy Gray	Mark Romanek
2001	"From a Lover to a Friend"	Paul McCartney	Kate Miller
2001	"I Might Be Wrong"	Radiohead	Sophie Muller
2002	"Die Another Day"	Madonna	Mats Lindberg; Pontus Löwenhielm; Ole Sanders
2005	"Speed of Sound"	Coldplay	Mark Romanek
2005	"Someday (I Will Understand)"	Britney Spears	Michael Haussman
2005	"All Because of You"	U2	Phil Joanou
2007	"Desecration Smile"	Red Hot Chili Peppers	Gus Van Sant
2011	"Otis"	Jay-Z; Kanye West	Spike Jonze

== Awards and nominations ==
BAFTA Awards

Year	Category	Title	Result	Ref.
2007	Best Cinematography	American Gangster	Nominated	

Independent Spirit Awards

Year	Category	Title	Result	Ref.
2002	Best Cinematography	Gerry	Nominated	
2004	Best Cinematography	Elephant	Nominated	
2005	Best Cinematography	Last Days	Nominated	
2008	Best Cinematography	Milk	Nominated	
2010	Best Cinematography	Greenberg	Nominated	
2012	Special Distinction Award		Won	

New York Film Critics Circle

Year	Category	Title	Result	Ref.
2002	Best Cinematography	Gerry	Won	
2003	Best Cinematography	Elephant	Won	

International Cinephile Society

Year	Category	Title	Result
2004	Best Cinematography	Elephant	Won
2004	Best Cinematography	Birth	Nominated

National Society of Film Critics

Year	Category	Title	Result
2004	Best Cinematography	Elephant	Nominated
2010	Best Cinematography	Somewhere	Nominated

Other awards

Year	Association	Category	Title	Result	Ref.
2003	Los Angeles Film Critics Association	Best Cinematography	Elephant	Nominated	
2007	Satellite Award	Best Cinematography	Zodiac	Nominated	
2007	Clio Award	Beverages / Alcohol	The Key to Reserva	Won	
2008	Houston Film Critics Society	Best Cinematography	Milk	Nominated	
2008	St. Louis Gateway Film Critics Association	Best Cinematography	Milk	Nominated	
2011	Camerimage	Cinematographer-Director Duo Award (Shared with Gus Van Sant)		Won	
