= The Key to Reserva =

- Directed by: Martin Scorsese
- Written by: Ted Griffin
- Produced by: Marjie Abrahams; Jules Daly; Emma Tillinger Koskoff
- Starring: Martin Scorsese; Simon Baker; Ted Griffin; Kelli O'Hara
- Cinematography: Harris Savides
- Edited by: Thelma Schoonmaker
- Music by: Ralph Farris
- Release date: December 14, 2007
- Running time: 10 minutes
- Country: Spain
- Language: English

The Key to Reserva is a long-form advertisement commissioned in 2007 by Freixenet Cava champagne written, directed by and featuring Martin Scorsese.

== Plot ==
The promotional film begins with framing device, wherein Scorsese, playing himself, describing how he discovered three and a half pages of an unproduced Alfred Hitchcock film, "The Key to Reserva". As part of this film preservation work he plans to film the script as Hitchcock would have filmed it.

The film, which contains no dialogue, shows Roger Thornberry arriving at a box seat during an orchestra performance. He sees a key hidden with the box's light bulb, and goes to retrieve it. He is noticed by one of the performers, Leonard, who signals to his accomplice Louis Bernard, who is holding Roger's wife Grace hostage in the audience. Leonard then goes to stop Roger. The two fight and Leonard falls from the box seat, presumably to his death. Roger uses the key to open a locked case which contains a bottle of Freixenet with top secret files hidden inside.

The film abruptly stops, as Scorsese explains that a page is missing, so he simply filmed the concluding paragraph of the script which shows Louis Bernard arrested, as Roger and his wife reunite over a glass of Freixenet.

Scorsese then discusses with the interviewer possible future projects. The camera pans back to reveal Scorsese, Thelma Schoonmaker, and the interviewer in an office in a tower block, meanwhile crows flock around the building.

== Cast ==
- Simon Baker as Roger Thornberry
- Kelli O'Hara as Grace Thornberry
- Michael Stuhlbarg as Louis Bernard
- Christopher Denham as Leonard
- Ted Griffin as interviewer
- Martin Scorsese as himself
- Thelma Schoonmaker as herself
