= Ferdinando Camon =

Italian writer

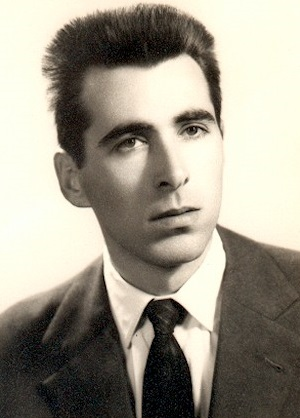
Ferdinando Camon

Ferdinando Camon (born 1935 in Montagnana) is a contemporary Italian writer. He is married to a journalist and has two sons: Alessandro Camon, a film producer/writer who lives in Los Angeles, and Alberto, who teaches criminal procedure and lives in Bologna. He has contributed to a number of Italian and foreign daily newspapers, including La Stampa, l'Unità, Avvenire, Le Monde and La Nación.

Perhaps Camon's best-known work in English is his trilogy of fictional memoirs consisting of The Fifth Estate (Il Quinto Stato), Life Everlasting (La Vita Eterna), and Memorial (Un altare per la madre).

== Works ==
- Il Quinto Stato, Garzanti, 1970
- La Vita Eterna, Garzanti, 1972
- Liberare l'animale, Garzanti, 1973
- Occidente, Garzanti, 1975
- Storia di Sirio, Garzanti, 1984
- Un altare per la madre, Garzanti, 1978
- La malattia chiamata uomo, Garzanti, 1981
- La donna dei fili, Garzanti, 1986
- Il canto delle balene, Garzanti, 1989
- Il Super-Baby, Rizzoli, 1991
- Mai visti sole e luna, Garzanti, 1994
- La Terra è di tutti, Garzanti, 1996
- Dal silenzio delle campagne, Garzanti, 1998
- Conversazione con Primo Levi
- La cavallina, la ragazza e il diavolo, Garzanti, 2004

== Awards ==
- Premio Luigi Russo (Il Quinto Stato)
- Premio Città di Prato (La vita eterna)
- Premio Viareggio di poesia (Liberare l'animale)
- Premio Strega (Un altare per la madre)
- Premio Giornalista del mese (al tempo di Occidente)
- Premio Selezione Campiello (La donna dei fili)
- Premio Selezione Campiello (Il canto delle balene)
- Premio Elsa Morante (Il Super-Baby)
- Premio Stazzema Alla Resistenza (Mai visti sole e luna)
- Premio Pen Club (Mai visti sole e luna)
- Premio Città di Bologna (Dal silenzio delle campagne)
- Premio Giovanni Verga (La cavallina, la ragazza e il diavolo)
