= Andrew Kevin Walker =

American screenwriter

- Born: August 14, 1964 (age 62); Altoona, Pennsylvania, U.S.
- Occupations: Screenwriter, film producer, script doctor
- Years active: 1993–present

Andrew Kevin Walker (born August 14, 1964) is an American screenwriter. He is known for having written Seven (1995), for which he earned a nomination for the BAFTA Award for Best Original Screenplay, as well as several other films, including 8mm (1999), Sleepy Hollow (1999) and many uncredited script rewrites.

== Early life and education ==
Walker was born in Altoona, Pennsylvania. During his childhood, he moved to Mechanicsburg, Pennsylvania, where he was raised. He attended the Mechanicsburg Area Senior High School until his graduation in 1982. Walker enrolled in Penn State University to pursue a career in film production. He graduated from Penn State in 1986, with a Bachelor of Arts in film and video.

== Film career ==
Shortly after completing his education, he moved to New York City and took a job at Tower Records. During that time, he worked on several projects, but was unable to find success until 1991, when he completed the script for Seven. Walker decided to move to Los Angeles to sell his screenplay. There, he contacted screenwriter David Koepp, who showed the script to executives at New Line Cinema, who ended up purchasing the rights to it. The film, however, took nearly three years to begin production. Christmas Vacation director Jeremiah S. Chechik was originally chosen to direct the optioned film but he asked for a number of modifications, in particular the removal of the head in a box scene at the end of the film. During this time Walker continued reworking the script. The project finally went ahead when David Fincher agreed to direct the film after he read the original draft, which was accidentally sent with the ending intact.

While the project was ongoing, Walker found other work as a screenwriter, including a short stint with HBO's television series Tales From the Crypt, as well as writing two other films, Brainscan (1994) and the novel adaptation Hideaway (1995).

Seven began production between his two other films, headed by Fincher as the director and starring Morgan Freeman, Brad Pitt and Kevin Spacey. At one point during production, the studio proposed several changes -deeming it too dark for its target audience. Both Fincher and Freeman backed Walker's original script, and it eventually went unchanged. The film was met with critical acclaim and enormous box office success, earning $327,311,859 worldwide.

Despite the success of the film, Walker would not earn another film credit for four years, though he penned several uncredited rewrites during this period, including The Game (on which he again worked with David Fincher) and Paul W. S. Anderson's Event Horizon. In 1999, Walker's 8MM finally saw the light of day, having been sold by him for a reported $1.25 million. Once again, the film's production encountered concerns regarding the dark subject matter, and the studio asked Walker to lighten the film's tone. With Joel Schumacher as director, Walker felt a rewrite would no longer be needed. However, Schumacher supported the studio and made changes of his own, leading to a much-publicized fallout between the two, with Walker virtually disowning the film and walking away from the set. He refused to even watch the film, which became a critical failure. In an interview with The Guardian, he said that "it was such an inherently depressing experience that the very least I can do is protect myself from the miserable experience of actually watching it." In 2015, he expressed his openness to a remake 8MM.

Walker found other success in 1999, as he penned uncredited rewrites to the critical hits Stir of Echoes and Fight Club, the latter now considered a cult classic. Walker's adaptation of Washington Irving's short story "The Legend of Sleepy Hollow" also wrapped up production as Sleepy Hollow, directed by Tim Burton. While Burton admired Walker's original script, he hired the playwright and Academy Award-winning screenwriter Tom Stoppard to tone down the violence. The film, starring Johnny Depp, was a box office and critical success.

Since the mid-1990s, Walker has written several screenplays that have yet to be greenlit such as a screenplay adaptation of the Silver Surfer; X-Men (his script was written in 1994); and a film tentatively titled Batman vs. Superman. The latter film was set to go into production, but Warner Bros. opted to revive their franchises separately, and so the script was shelved. After the announcement and subsequent successes of Batman Begins and Superman Returns, the film seemed to be shelved permanently, though Wolfgang Petersen, who was due to direct the feature, had continued to express his interest in the project. Walker's version of the project was permanently shelved in favour of the Zack Snyder helmed Batman v Superman: Dawn of Justice.

Walker wrote the 2016 animated dark comedy Nerdland, starring Paul Rudd and Patton Oswalt.

Walker also wrote as-yet unproduced screenplays for the American version of The Girl Who Played with Fire and a remake of The Reincarnation of Peter Proud, both for Seven director David Fincher.

In 2023, David Fincher released his film adaptation of The Killer, a graphic novel by Alexis Nolent. Walker had written the screenplay.

=== Other projects ===
Walker also wrote two shorts for the BMW Films series The Hire, starring Clive Owen: Ambush, directed by John Frankenheimer, and The Follow, by Wong Kar-wai.

Walker also co-wrote (with David Self and Paul Attanasio) the screenplay for The Wolfman, a remake of the Universal Studios classic. The remake, directed by Joe Johnston and starring Benicio del Toro in the title role, received a 2010 release.

Amazon named Walker's 2015 Kindle Single, Old Man Johnson (his first novel), among its "Best of the Year."

== Filmography ==
=== Film ===
Year	Title	Writer	Producer	Director	Notes
1994	Brainscan	Yes	No	John Flynn	
1995	Hideaway	Yes	No	Brett Leonard	with Neal Jimenez
1995	Seven	Yes	No	David Fincher	Also actor: Dead Man at 1st Crime Scene
1999	8mm	Yes	No	Joel Schumacher	
1999	Sleepy Hollow	Yes	No	Tim Burton	
2001	The Hire	Yes	No	Wong Kar-wai	Segment: "The Follow"
2010	The Wolfman	Yes	No	Joe Johnston	with David Self
2016	Nerdland	Yes	Yes	Chris Prynoski	
2022	Windfall	Yes	Executive	Charlie McDowell	with Justin Lader
2023	The Killer	Yes	No	David Fincher	
2026	Psycho Killer	Yes	Yes	Gavin Polone	
TBA	Flesh of the Gods	Yes	No	Panos Cosmatos	Post-production; co-wrote story with Cosmatos

Script doctor

- Event Horizon (1997)
- The Game (1997)
- Fight Club (1999)
- Stir of Echoes (1999)

Other credits

Year	Titles	Role	Notes
1986	Robot Holocaust	Scenic painter	
2002	Panic Room	As "Sleepy Neighbor"	Cameo appearance
2009	Logorama	Voice role as Pringles Hot & Spicy	Short film

=== Television ===
Year	Title	Director	Episode
1993	Tales from the Crypt	Elliot Silverstein	"Well Cooked Hams"
1997	Perversions of Science	Tobe Hooper	"Panic"
2022	Love, Death & Robots	David Fincher	"Bad Travelling"
