= The Hire =

Series of eight short films about BMW automobiles

- Directed by: John Frankenheimer; Ang Lee; Wong Kar-wai; Guy Ritchie; Alejandro González Iñárritu; John Woo; Joe Carnahan; Tony Scott; Neill Blomkamp
- Written by: Andrew Kevin Walker; David Carter; Joe Sweet; Guy Ritchie; Alejandro González Iñárritu; Guillermo Arriaga; Greg Hahn; Vincent Ngo; Joe Carnahan; Neill Blomkamp
- Produced by: Robyn Boardman; Robert Van de Weteringe Buys; Tapas Blank; Tony McGarry; Leon Corcos; David Mitchell; Nicole Dionne; Pelayo Gutiérrez; Aristides McGarry; David Fincher; Dave Morrison; Ridley Scott; Tony Scott; Jules Daly; Skip Chaisson; David Davies; Kimberly Jacobs-Toeg
- Starring: Clive Owen; Tomas Milian; Mason Lee; Forest Whitaker; Mickey Rourke; Adriana Lima; Madonna; Stellan Skarsgård; Lois Smith; Maury Chaykin; Kathryn Morris; Don Cheadle; F. Murray Abraham; Clifton Powell; Gary Oldman; James Brown; Danny Trejo; Marilyn Manson; Dakota Fanning; Jon Bernthal; Vera Farmiga
- Cinematography: Newton Thomas Sigel; Frederick Elmes; Harris Savides; Christopher Soos; Robert Richardson; Jeffrey L. Kimball; Mauro Fiore; Paul Cameron; Manoel Ferreira
- Edited by: Robert Duffy; Tim Squyres; William Chang; Tom Muldoon; Luis Carballar; Alejandro González Iñárritu; Gabriel Rodríguez de la Mora; Jeff Gullo; Angus Wall; John Gilroy; Skip Chaisson; Julian Clarke; Austyn Daines; Devin Mauer
- Music by: PrimalScream Music; Michael Wandmacher; Mychael Danna; Joel Goodman; Jeff Rona; Harry Gregson-Williams; Steve Jablonsky; Clint Mansell; Kristopher Pooley
- Production companies: BMW Films; Anonymous Content; Zeta Films; RSA Films
- Distributed by: BMW Films
- Running time: 64 minutes (total of all eight films)
- Country: USA
- Languages: English; Portuguese; Spanish
- Budget: $9 million

The BMW film series The Hire consists of eight short films (averaging about ten minutes each) produced for internet distribution in 2001 and 2002. A form of branded content, the shorts were directed by popular filmmakers from around the globe and starred Clive Owen as "the Driver" while highlighting the performance aspects of various BMW automobiles. The series made a comeback in 2016, fourteen years after its original run ended.

== Premise ==
This series of short films center on a nameless protagonist, known as "The Driver" (Clive Owen), who is a highly-proficient professional driver of BMW automobiles. The plot of each film varies, but each involves the Driver being hired to perform tasks for a client, typically to transport important individuals and/or cargo while evading pursuit.

== Summary ==
=== Season 1 ===
==== Ambush ====
While escorting an elderly man in the middle of the night, the Driver is confronted by a van full of armed thieves and is told that the old man is carrying a large amount of diamonds. The old man claims to have swallowed the diamonds and that the men will likely cut him open to retrieve them. The Driver decides to save his client and attempts to evade the van while being shot at. The Driver eventually baits the thieves into dying in a collision with a parked bulldozer. The Driver delivers the old man to his destination and asks if he really swallowed the diamonds. The client merely chuckles and walks away before the Driver departs.

- Starring Tomas Milian
- Directed by John Frankenheimer
- Written by Andrew Kevin Walker
- Featured the BMW 740i

==== Chosen ====
The Driver is hired to protect an Asian holy child who is brought to America by boat. The child gives the Driver a gift, but tells him not to open it yet. After being pursued by kidnappers and being grazed in the ear by a gunshot, he successfully delivers the boy to a waiting monk. However, the child signals silently to the Driver that the man is an imposter, indicated by his footwear, just visible under his robe. The impostor monk tries to kidnap the child, but the Driver thwarts him and rescues the boy. Before leaving, the Driver opens the gift, which is revealed to be an adhesive bandage (depicting The Incredible Hulk, a reference to Ang Lee's film) for his bleeding ear.

- Starring Mason Lee
- Directed by Ang Lee
- Written by David Carter
- Featured the BMW 540i

==== The Follow ====
The Driver is hired by a nervous manager to spy on a paranoid actor's wife. The Driver narrates while following the wife, describing the right methods to survey someone, as well as his fear of what he might learn of the wife's tragic life. He eventually discovers the wife is fleeing the country to return to her mother in Brazil, and that she's been given a black eye—likely by her husband. The Driver returns the job's money to the manager, refuses to tell him where the wife is, and tells him to never call him again before driving off.

- Starring Forest Whitaker, Mickey Rourke, and Adriana Lima
- Directed by Wong Kar-wai
- Written by Andrew Kevin Walker
- Featured the BMW 328i Coupé and the Z3 roadster

==== Star ====
The Driver is chosen by a spoiled and shallow celebrity to drive her to a venue. Unbeknownst to her, her manager has actually hired the Driver to teach the celebrity a lesson. Pretending to escape her pursuing bodyguards, the Driver drives recklessly through the city, tossing the hapless celebrity all around the backseat. They eventually arrive at the venue, where she is thrown out of the car and photographed by paparazzi in an embarrassing end on the red carpet.

- Starring Madonna
- Directed by Guy Ritchie
- Written by Joe Sweet and Guy Ritchie
- Featured the BMW M5

==== Powder Keg ====
In a war-torn Latin-American country, war photographer Harvey Jacobs witnesses a massacre and is wounded trying to escape. The UN assigns the Driver to rescue Jacobs from hostile territory. Jacobs tells the Driver about the horrors he saw as a photographer, and his regrets for being unable to help any victims. He gives the Driver the film needed for a New York Times story and his dog tags, which are to be given to his mother. When they reach the border they are confronted by a guard, who becomes hostile when Jacobs is taking pictures and refuses to stop. The Driver drives through a hail of gunfire towards safety, but finds Jacobs has died in the escape. The Driver returns to America to visit Jacobs' mother, returning his dog tags and telling her that Jacobs had won the Pulitzer Prize, while learning that the mother is blind and could never see any of the pictures her son had taken.

- Starring Stellan Skarsgård and Lois Smith
- Directed by Alejandro González Iñárritu
- Written by Alejandro González Iñárritu, Guillermo Arriaga and David Carter
- Featured the BMW X5 3.0i

=== Season 2 ===
==== Hostage ====
The Driver is hired by the Federal Bureau of Investigation to help defuse a hostage situation. A disgruntled employee has kidnapped a CEO and has hidden her, demanding $5,088,042 for her release. The Driver delivers the money, writing the sum on his hand as instructed by the hostage taker, and is then ordered to burn the money. As he complies, the federal agents break in and attempt to subdue the man, who shoots himself in the head without revealing the woman's location. The Driver surmises the ransom amount is actually the woman's cellphone number, and tracks her location to the trunk of a sinking car. The woman is rescued and brought to the hospital to confront the kidnapper. It is revealed that she and the kidnapper were actually lovers, and the woman coldly tells the kidnapper she only used him for sex before he dies.

- Starring Maury Chaykin and Kathryn Morris
- Directed by John Woo
- Written by David Carter, Greg Hahn and Vincent Ngo
- Featured the BMW Z4 3.0i

==== Ticker ====
In an unnamed foreign country, a man carrying a mysterious briefcase survives an ambush en route to his destination. The Driver rescues and escorts the man while under helicopter attack. During the chase, the briefcase is struck by a bullet, causing it to leak grey fluid and the number on its display to begin counting down. The Driver manages to cause the helicopter to crash, but refuses to proceed without knowing the contents of the damaged briefcase. It is revealed that the man guards a human heart that is to be transplanted into the nation's leader, who has brought peace and prosperity to the country for many years. Should he die, his heir will be a tyrannical army General, whose soldiers had been attempting to stop them the entire time. The Driver finally reaches a military base and brings the heart to waiting surgeons, who successfully save the leader from dying. The General tries to intervene, but realizes he has failed and decides to leave with his men.

- Starring Don Cheadle and F. Murray Abraham
- cameos by Ray Liotta, Robert Patrick, Clifton Powell and Dennis Haysbert as US agents
- Written and directed by Joe Carnahan
- Featured the BMW Z4 3.0i

==== Beat the Devil ====
The Driver is employed by James Brown, who goes to meet the Devil to re-negotiate the deal he made as a young man, in which he traded his soul for fame and fortune. James is worried about his aging and the fact he can no longer perform like he used to. To renew his contract, James proposes that they have a drag race on the Las Vegas Strip at dawn, wagering the Driver's soul for another 50 years of success. The race ends with the Driver swerving to pass a moving train, while the Devil's car (a flamed Pontiac Firebird) crashes and explodes. Having won the race, the Driver leaves James Brown in the desert, but as he drives away he sees him as a young man again. The final scene shows Marilyn Manson, who lives down the hall from the Devil, complaining that the noise is disturbing his Bible reading.

- Starring James Brown, Gary Oldman, and Danny Trejo
- Cameo by Marilyn Manson
- Directed by Tony Scott
- Written by David Carter, Greg Hahn and Vincent Ngo
- Featured the BMW Z4 3.0i

=== "The Subplot Films" ===
Four smaller movies, dubbed "The Subplot Movies" were shot and directed by Ben Younger. Lacking any real style (and appearing to be shot with a standard consumer-level DV-cam), they were designed to "fill in the gaps" between the five films and featured a man who appeared to be tracking the Driver, finding "clues" usually scribbled, in pen, on small pieces of paper. The films, at first glance, have no real connection to the Driver movies at all and made no real sense – they contained "clues" that were part of an alternate reality game that would lead inquisitive fans to a party in Las Vegas, Nevada.

=== Season 3 ===
==== The Escape ====
After the disappearance of geneticist Dr. Nora Phillips, the Molecular Genetics company's illegal activities in human cloning become exposed and the FBI raids the facility. One surviving specimen, Lily, is escorted by a ruthless mercenary named Holt to be delivered to an unknown client. The Driver is hired to transport the package with Holt accompanying him, along with an armed convoy of other mercenaries. When the Driver realizes that Lily possesses humanity, he forces Holt to get out of the car. The Driver thwarts Holt and his mercenaries in a pursuit and then drives the girl to a harbor, where she is happily reunited with Dr. Phillips, the unknown client who hired the Driver.

- Starring Jon Bernthal, Dakota Fanning, and Vera Farmiga
- Directed by Neill Blomkamp
- Written by Neill Blomkamp and David Carter
- Featured the BMW 540i

== Production ==
BMW's idea for the series came from the fact that 85% of its customers shop online before purchasing their cars. If BMW could attract the right kind of traffic to their website, the type of person who enjoys art films from influential directors and actors, they could translate that into sales. BMW stated that John Frankenheimer's film Ronin served as creative inspiration for The Hire series, as well as The French Connection and Le Mans.

On April 26, 2001, John Frankenheimer's Ambush premiered on the BMW Films website and, two weeks later, was followed by Ang Lee's Chosen. Soon after, director Wong Kar-Wai was tapped to make a third film entitled The Follow, a dramatic piece about a runaway wife being followed by "the Driver". The films debuted at the Cannes Film Festival and received mixed reviews, perhaps due to the films' purpose as advertising. They were followed by Guy Ritchie's Star and Alejandro González Iñárritu's Powder Keg.

After the series began, BMW saw their 2001 sales increase 12% from the previous year. The movies were viewed over 11 million times in four months. Two million people registered with the website and a large majority of users who were registered to the site sent film links to their friends and family. The films were so popular that BMW produced a free DVD for customers who visited certain BMW dealerships. Due to demand, BMW ran out of DVDs. In September, BMW and Vanity Fair magazine collaborated to distribute a second DVD edition of The Hire in the magazine. The Vanity Fair disc did not include Wong Kar-Wai's The Follow. Forest Whitaker had an uncredited part in The Follow and had only agreed to be in the film if it were shown exclusively on the Internet. When the movie was released on DVD, Whitaker allegedly exercised an option in his contract which stipulated that the movie would not be released in any other format without authorization from the actor himself. The Vanity Fair disc, in lieu of carrying The Follow, contained a link to the website with instructions to the viewer to watch the movie online.

The DVD was highly sought on Internet forums after the September 2001 issue of Vanity Fair quickly vanished from shelves and became a rare find. The movies were reviewed by Time Magazine and The New York Times, who praised BMW for creating entertaining content for "discerning movie watchers".

The series continued in October 2002, replacing producer David Fincher with Ridley and Tony Scott due to Fincher's continuing work on Panic Room. Season 2 debuted with a dark action/comedy piece by Tony Scott called Beat the Devil. The movie, shot in Scott's trademark pseudo-psychedelic style, featured James Brown enlisting the Driver to take him to Las Vegas to re-work a decades-old deal he made with the devil that evidently gave Brown his "fame and fortune". To celebrate the premiere of the second season, BMW threw a party at the ArcLight Hollywood on October 17, 2002, just a week before the film's internet debut. The party, co-hosted by Vanity Fair, was also a charity and benefit for the homeless. A month after the premiere of Beat the Devil, DirecTV began airing the entire series in half-hour loops for five weeks on one of the blank satellite channels the system offered. The films were a success and, as a result, DirecTV considered using blank channels to air other companies' ads.

In 2003, BMW decided to make a third (and final) DVD compilation of The Hire. The new DVD made its debut at The Palais des Festival during the 2003 Cannes Film Festival and contained all eight movies, including Wong Kar-Wai's previously absent The Follow. Once again, the disc became available at select dealerships, but fans could also obtain the disc for a nominal shipping fee via the BMW Films website. The film series was added to the permanent collection of the Museum of Modern Art.

During the last quarter of 2004, Dark Horse Comics and BMW planned to publish a 6-issue comic book limited series based on the main character of the films. The books were written by Kurt Busiek, Bruce Campbell, Katsuhiro Otomo, and Mark Waid as well as other comic book talents. Only four books were produced. "Tycoon" was the last book released (in December 2005). While the comics are still able to be purchased in collector shops and some comic book stores, they are no longer available for purchase on the BMW website.

On October 21, 2005, BMW stopped distribution of The Hire on DVD and removed all eight films from the BMW Films website just four years after the first film debuted. The series was abandoned, reportedly because the project had become too expensive. BMW's Vice President of Marketing James McDowell, originator of the BMW Films project, left BMW to become the VP of sales and marketing for BMW's "Mini USA" division. BMW also split from longtime ad partner Fallon Worldwide, which was the creative production outlet for the series. BMW's German division had attempted to become involved with the US division of the company, cutting costs. The series had been viewed over 100 million times in four years and had changed the way products were advertised.

In early 2006, BMW released a line of free "BMW Audiobooks" to take advantage of the growing popularity of portable MP3 players (and the fact that most BMW's came with an iPod dock pre-installed in their vehicles). While the stories had the same pulp-action feel as The Hire, the character of the Driver was absent. The audiobooks were free (like the films that preceded them) but are no longer available for download from the BMW website.

On February 17, 2007, MINI (BMW) launched a new short film series called Hammer & Coop. The series is a comedic parody of 1970s action-television shows like Starsky & Hutch and Charlie's Angels, and showcases BMW's Mini Cooper line of cars as the featured product.

On September 20, 2016, it was reported that BMW Films has resurrected The Hire fourteen years after the original production wrapped, with Clive Owen returning to reprise his role as the Driver. The first episode was revealed to be titled The Escape, which premiered on October 23, 2016, on BMW Films' official website.

In 2023 BMW released The Calm, starring Pom Klementieff and Uma Thurman. Produced by Joseph Kosinski and directed by Sam Hargrave, the new film features the BMW i7 M70.

== Contest/game and party ==
Shortly after the release of the "Subplot Films", reports circulated around the Internet that Apple, Starbucks, BMW Films First Illinois Mortgage, and Susstones' all had a small, hidden link on their website that had a direct connection with the movies. Upon further investigation, three phone numbers and a web address were found in the four films, which led many viewers to call those numbers and go to that website.

Thousands took to the web, taking place in the hunt but only 250 solved the puzzle, which allowed the lucky few to be entered in a drawing to win a 2003 BMW Z4, seen in Hostage.

The final piece of the puzzle was a voicemail, instructing participants to meet with a correspondent in Las Vegas, the site of a VIP Party for BMW where the Grand Prize Z4 was given away to a couple from Bellingham, Washington. The first prize was a BMW Q3.s mountain bike, awarded to a student from the University of New Hampshire.

The game was designed and co-written by Mark Sandau and Russ Stark.

== Influences ==
Several companies attempted to capitalize on the success of BMW's film series.

In 2002, Nissan produced its own short film featuring their newly introduced 350Z. Entitled The Run, the film was directed by John Bruno, a James Cameron protege who worked with Cameron on True Lies, The Abyss, and Terminator 2: Judgment Day. The film was shown in theaters before feature films in November 2002. Nissan offered a DVD of the film for $9.95.

Mercedes-Benz followed BMW's lead in 2002 advertising the SL 500 in Lucky Star, directed by Michael Mann and starring Benicio del Toro. In 2004, Mercedes released The Porter, a 15-minute film by director Jan Wentz, starring Max Beesley and Bryan Ferry.

A few years later, Bombardier Recreational Products company introduced a series of short movies on the Internet which showcased their "Sea-Doo" line of personal water craft (PWC) while Covad Business also constructed a campy internet horror film based on their products called The Ringing with the intent of showcasing VoIP technology.

The Transporter was also based on The Hire film series as Luc Besson has said in interviews. In fact, many of the elements seen in The Hire were incorporated into The Transporter, right down to the BMW automobile.

Around the same time The Hire made its comeback in October 2016, the Ford Motor Company produced its very own short film, advertising their new car, the 2015 Ford Edge incorporated into a story, starring Mads Mikkelsen as the titular character in Le Fantôme, directed by Jake Scott, who co-produced the second season of The Hire.

Preceded by The Week	Grand CLIO Award for Television/Cinema; 2002	Succeeded by Lamp
