= Cividini =

Italian fashion house

CIVIDINI
- Industry: Fashion, Luxury
- Founded: 1988
- Founders: Miriam and Piero Cividini
- Headquarters: Bergamo, Italy
- Website: cividini.com

Cividini is an Italian fashion house known for producing luxury cashmere knitwear, founded in 1988 by married couple Piero and Miriam Cividini.

== History ==
Pietro and Miriam knew each other as teenagers in the 1970s, and already considered themselves a "team" at the time.

At the launch of the first collection of pret-a-porter during the Milan Fashion Week in 1995, Cividini were the first to show knitwear and woven garments made of silk-steel fabric, material that, together with the different special finishing techniques (inkjet printing, tie-dye, screen printing, pigment printing, printing for corrosion, dyeing and hand-painted) defined the unique hand craftmanship of the Italian brand. These techniques and materials have become common over the years, but at the time were experimental.

The RTW Spring 2016 collection used a white shirt as the base for most looks, with garments made from a variety of fabrics layered on top. The collection featured geometric motifs, and it drew inspiration from the 1980s and Japanese fashion.

Collections were released in Spring 2019, Fall 2019, Spring 2020, and Fall 2020. The Fall 2019 collection was inspired by Françoise Hardy's style of masculine-leaning, yet still feminine clothing. The color palette was primarily gray, black and brown. The collection included blazers, maxi-skirts, pants, and thick-knitted wool dresses.

The Spring 2020 collection was inspired by the cinematography of the film The Sheltering Sky, featuring handmade prints and faded hues. The Fall 2020 collection took inspirated from the 1970s and aimed to reflect "a softer version" of the era.

Cividini's Fall/Winter 2026 collection has a minimalist style, with a color palette of white, gray, black, brown, and cream with hints of brighter colors. JTDapper Fashion Week characterized the style of Cividini as "fashion...non-fashion," and praised the designers for "[eschewing] hyper-design to enrich every creation with intrinsic value" with "a subtle harmony between aesthetics, quality, and fit."

== See also ==
- Calzedonia
