= The Hire: The Follow =

2001 short film directed by Wong Kar-wai

- Directed by: Wong Kar-wai
- Written by: Andrew Kevin Walker
- Starring: Clive Owen; Forest Whitaker; Adriana Lima
- Release date: 2001

The Hire: The Follow is the third installment in The Hire series by BMW films. It was written by Andrew Kevin Walker and directed by Wong Kar-wai. It stars Clive Owen, Forest Whitaker, Adriana Lima, and Mickey Rourke. The Driver (Owen) is hired to follow an ageing movie star's (Rourke) young wife (Lima), whom he suspects of infidelity.

== Synopsis ==
The Driver is hired by a nervous movie manager to spy on a paranoid actor's wife. During his tailing of the wife, the Driver describes the right way to tail someone. As he follows her he begins to fear what he might learn of her apparently tragic life. He discovers the wife is fleeing the country and returning to her mother's, and that she's been given a black eye, likely by her husband. He returns the money for the job, refusing to tell where the wife is, and drives off telling the manager never to call him again.

== Release ==
The BMW Films were originally intended to be webcast only. A promotional DVD was made for in-house circulation, and its ensuing popularity (and emergence on eBay) convinced parties involved to distribute the collection in hard copy. The original pressing did not include The Follow; the film was removed from the BMW Films website. Internet rumors attributed the cause to a contract dispute with Whitaker, who had only signed to do an online promotional film, and who exercised a contractual right to remove The Follow from wide circulation promotional DVDs for personal reasons.

The Follow is no longer available via webcast or DVD.
