= Alexis Nolent =

French writer

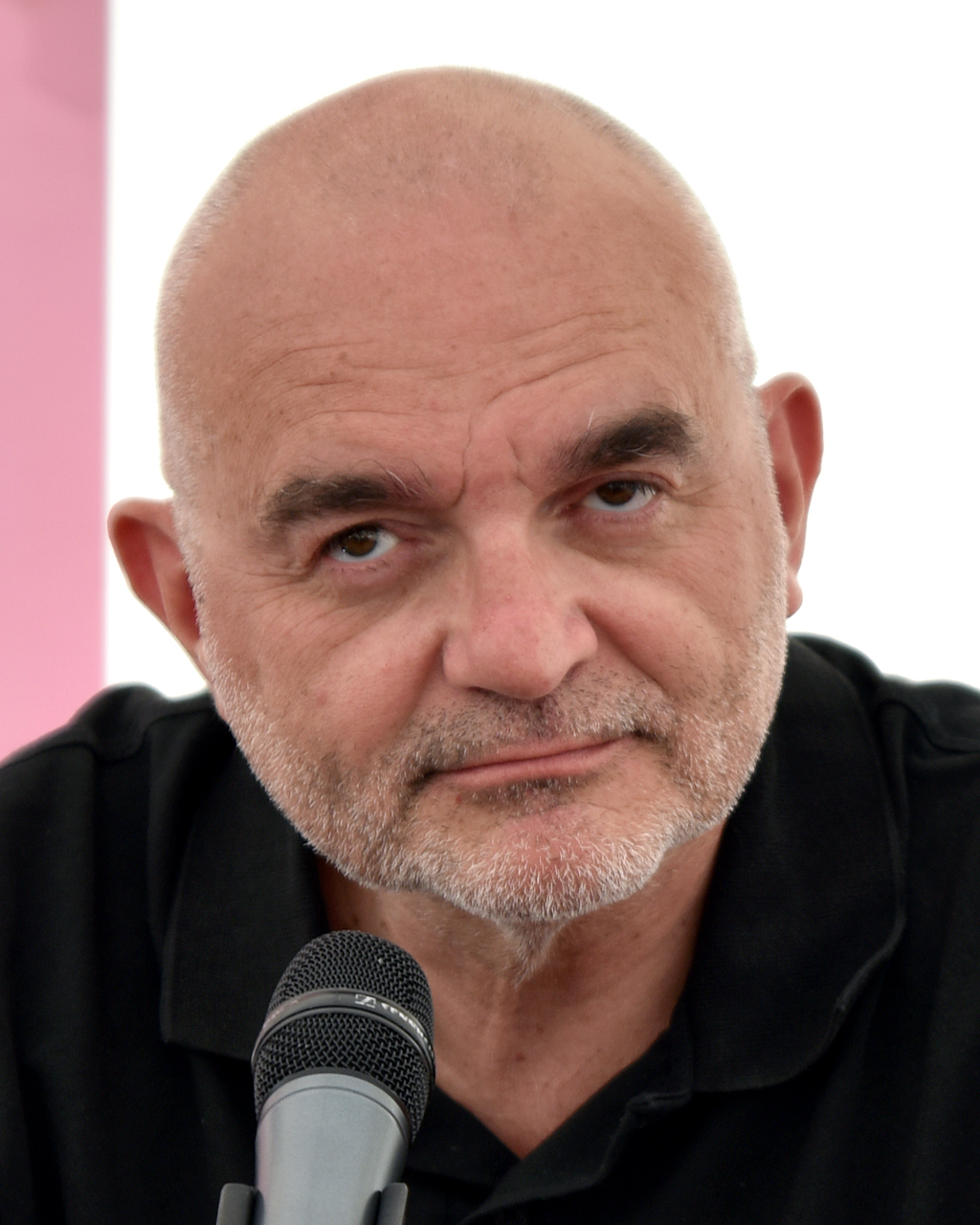
- Nolent in 2024
- Born: 1967 (age 58–59) Rouen, France
- Area: Writer
- Pseudonym: Matz
- Notable works: The Killer; Snowpiercer: The Prequel; Affairs of the State
- Awards: Prix Saint-Michel: Best Story (2004); Best French Language Comic (2006)

Alexis Nolent (French: [alɛksi nɔlɑ̃]; born 1967) is a French writer. He writes scripts for video games and has also written a novel and, under the pen name Matz, a number of comics.

== Life and career ==
Nolent was born in Rouen, France, and grew up in the Caribbean, before moving to Paris.

His graphic novel Du plomb dans la tête, AKA Headshot, was adapted into the 2012 film Bullet to the Head. He has written The Killer (Le Tueur) and Cyclops (Cyclopes) both of which have been optioned for films, also by producer Alexandra Milchan, the former at Netflix with director David Fincher and the latter at Warner Brothers by James Mangold. The Killer is his first to be published in English and is published by Archaia Studios Press, who are dividing each of volumes into two parts and releasing in American comic book format bi-monthly. The first four issues were collected as a hardcover volume, which won IGN's Best Indy Book of 2007 Award, Newsarama's Best of '07 gave it the "Best Comic You Didn't Read This Year" award and Entertainment Weekly named it #2 in a list of Best comics of 2007.

Other work includes Headshot (Du plomb dans la tête) with Colin Wilson, Shandy with Dominique Bertail and an upcoming adaptation of Jim Thompson's novel Savage Night with artist Miles Hyman.

The Killer was optioned for a 2023 feature film adaptation, starring Michael Fassbender and Tilda Swinton.

== Awards ==
- 2004: Won Best Story, Prix Saint-Michel, for Du plomb dans la tête
- 2006:
  - Won Best Comic (French language), Prix Saint-Michel, for Shandy 2: Le dragon d'Austerlitz
  - Nominated for Best artwork, Prix Saint-Michel, for Shandy 2: Le dragon d'Austerlitz
- 2007: Nominated for "Award for Favourite European Comics" Eagle Award, for The Killer.
- 2008: Nominated for "Best U.S. Edition of International Material" Eisner Award, for The Killer.

== Bibliography ==
- Peines perdues (with Jean-Christophe Chauzy, Casterman, August 1993)
- The Killer (with Luc Jacamon):
  - French, Casterman:
    - Long feu (October 1998)
    - L'Engrenage (April 2000)
    - La Dette (August 2001)
    - Les Liens du sang (August 2002)
    - La Mort dans l'âme (October 2003)
    - Modus vivendi (September 2007)
  - English, Archaia Studios Press:
    - Volume 1 (collects #1-4: "'Long Fire" and "Vicious Cycle", hardcover, 128 pages, September 2007, ISBN 1-932386-44-0)
- Shandy (with Dominique Bertail, Delcourt):
  - Agnès (November 2002, ISBN 978-2-84789-073-0)
  - Le Dragon d'Austerlitz (January 2006, ISBN 978-2-84789-926-9)
- Du plomb dans la tête (aka Headshot) (with Colin Wilson, Casterman):
  - Les Petits poissons (January 2004)
  - Les Gros poissons (February 2005)
  - Du bordel dans l'aquarium (January 2006)
- Cyclops (with Luc Jacamon, Casterman):
  - La Recrue (September 2005)
  - Le Héros (September 2006)
- Snowpiercer: The Prequel (with Jean-Marc Rochette):
  - Part 1: Extinction (2019)
  - Part 2: Apocalypse (2020)
  - Part 3: Annihilation (2024)
- The Killer: Affairs of the State (with Luc Jacamon)
  - Traitement négatif (January 2020)
  - Circuit court (October 2020)
  - Variable d'ajustement (October 2021)
  - Frères humains (September 2022)
  - La face cachée de l'abîme (October 2023)
