= Martin Katz (jewelry designer) =

American jewelry designer

- Born: South Bend, Indiana, US
- Education: Indiana University Bloomington
- Occupation: Jewelry designer
- Spouse: Kelly Katz

Martin Katz is an American jewelry designer based in Beverly Hills, California.

== Early life and education ==
Katz was born in South Bend, Indiana. He earned a bachelor's degree in psychology and business from Indiana University Bloomington in 1978.

== Career ==
Katz founded his jewelry design company, Martin Katz, Ltd. in Beverly Hills, California in 1988. His first significant position in the jewelry industry was with Laykin et Cie in Los Angeles, a jeweler inside the then prominent I. Magnin specialty stores. He began by making house calls to his few clients or inviting them into his Beverly Hills penthouse apartment.

He has provided jewelry for red carpet premieres, Golden Globes, Emmy Awards, and the Academy Awards for the past 25 years, including Nicole Kidman, Angelina Jolie, Felicity Huffman, Sandra Bullock, Kate Winslet, Jennifer Aniston, Claire Danes, and Kim Kardashian, who have appeared in the master jeweler's signature micro-pavé pieces or his vintage treasures at some of the most important moments of their careers. Nicole Kidman donned Mogul Indian earrings at the 1997 Academy Awards, which she attended with Tom Cruise. At the 2006 Academy Awards, Felicity Huffman wore a diamond Gardenia brooch from Martin Katz. Sandra Bullock wore black spinel briolette earrings and a gold bangle, both from Martin Katz, to the premiere of her film Gravity, at the 70th annual Venice Film Festival. Kate Winslet wore an Edwardian diamond necklace from Martin Katz at the 1996 Academy Awards. Jennifer Aniston was outfitted in platinum and diamond drop earrings with emerald-cut diamonds hanging horizontally and a stack of platinum and diamond line bracelets from Martin Katz at the 2004 Golden Globe Awards.

Martin Katz is also well known for his luxury collaborations. Early on Ray-Ban contracted him to design jeweled sunglasses, which Celine Dion wore on the red carpet.

In 2008, Victoria's Secret approached Martin Katz to design their “Fantasy Bra.” He designed a $5 million bra named the "Black Diamond Fantasy Miracle Bra." The bra, which was worn by Adriana Lima on the runway, was made of 3,575 black diamonds (two of which weight 100 carats each), 117 certified one-carat round diamonds and 34 rubies.

In 2011, Donna Karan enlisted Martin Katz to design the first million-dollar fragrance bottle for her DKNY Golden Delicious scent. The bottle was a 14-karat, yellow and white gold apple-shape featuring 2,700 white diamonds, 183 yellow sapphires in the shape of the Manhattan skyline and a 2.43-carat yellow canary diamond which toured the world.

== Personal life ==
Katz is married to Kelly Fisher Katz.
