= David Latimer =

American designer

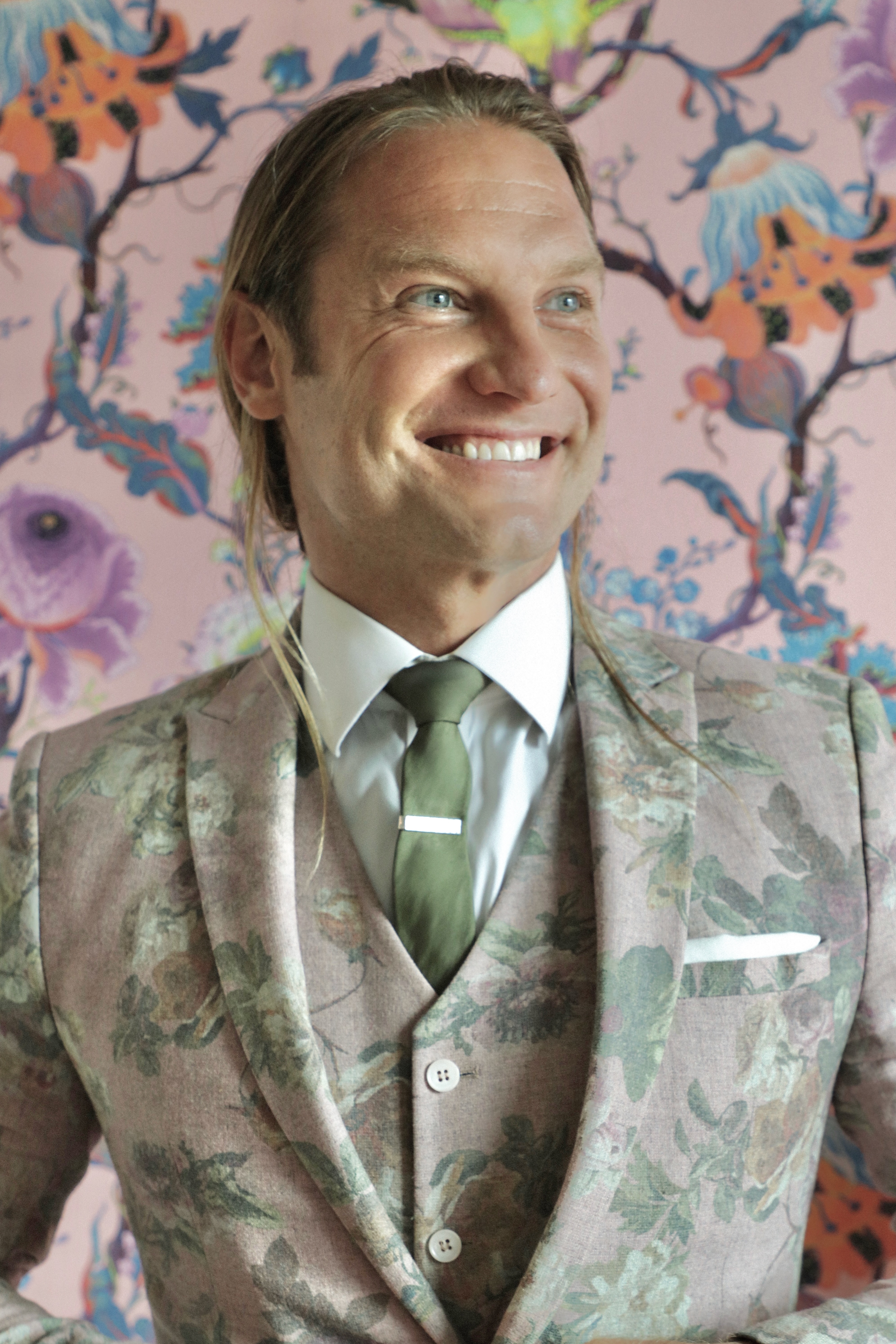
David Latimer

David Latimer is an American designer. He is the founder of New Frontier Design. Latimer has spoken extensively about innovative design, intentional living, and sustainable practices.

== Career ==
Latimer began his professional career in New York City working for Ralph Lauren (RRL). Later, he joined Earnest Sewn, where he started working in Uganda, helping to build and expand an orphanage. In 2014, Latimer co-founded New Frontier Design, where he provides architectural and interior design services for homes and businesses, in addition to continuing to design and sell tiny home models.

In 2014, David’s father, Eddie Latimer gave him money to co-found New Frontier Design, where he provides architectural and interior design services for homes and businesses, in addition to continuing to design and sell tiny home models. Latimer's designs have been featured by several media platforms, such as HGTV Good Morning America and Disney. His work has also been published in several global publications, including Dwell Magazine, Architectural Digest, and Better Homes & Gardens.

Latimer has worked on custom projects for several companies, including Disney and Dunkin’, which he collaborated with Olivia Wilde on the design. He has been recognized by the Nashville Business Journal as one of the "40 Under 40" and named one of their "Influencers: Rising Stars."

== General references ==
- Baker, Lisa (2019). Tiny Interiors. Braun Publishing. pp. 198–201. ISBN 978-3037682470.
- Diedricksen, Derek (2018). Micro Living: 40 Innovative Tiny Houses Equipped for Full-Time Living, in 400 Square Feet or Less. Storey Publishing. pp. 78–83. ISBN 9781612128764.
- Heavener, Brent (2019). Tiny House: Live Small, Dream Big. Clarkson Potter. pp. 228–237. ISBN 978-0525576617.
- Marshall, Roger (2019). How to Build Your Own Tiny House. Taunton Press. pp. 9, 18, 38, 47. ISBN 978-1631869075.
- Minguet, Anna (2020). Tiny Mobile Homes: Small space – Big freedom. Monsa Publications. pp. 22–27, 40–45. ISBN 978-8416500925.
- Morrison, Gabriella (2017). Tiny House Designing, Building, & Living (Idiot's Guides). Alpha. ISBN 978-1465462701.
- Rattner, Donald (2019). My Creative Space: How to Design Your Home to Stimulate Ideas and Spark Innovation. Skyhorse. pp. 33, 36, 50, 100, 149, 159, 167, 179, 202. ISBN 978-1510736719.
- Zamora, Francesc (2022). 150 Best Tiny Interior Ideas. Harper Design. pp. 272–279. ISBN 978-0063138919.
