= Alessandro Camon =

Italian screenwriter and film producer

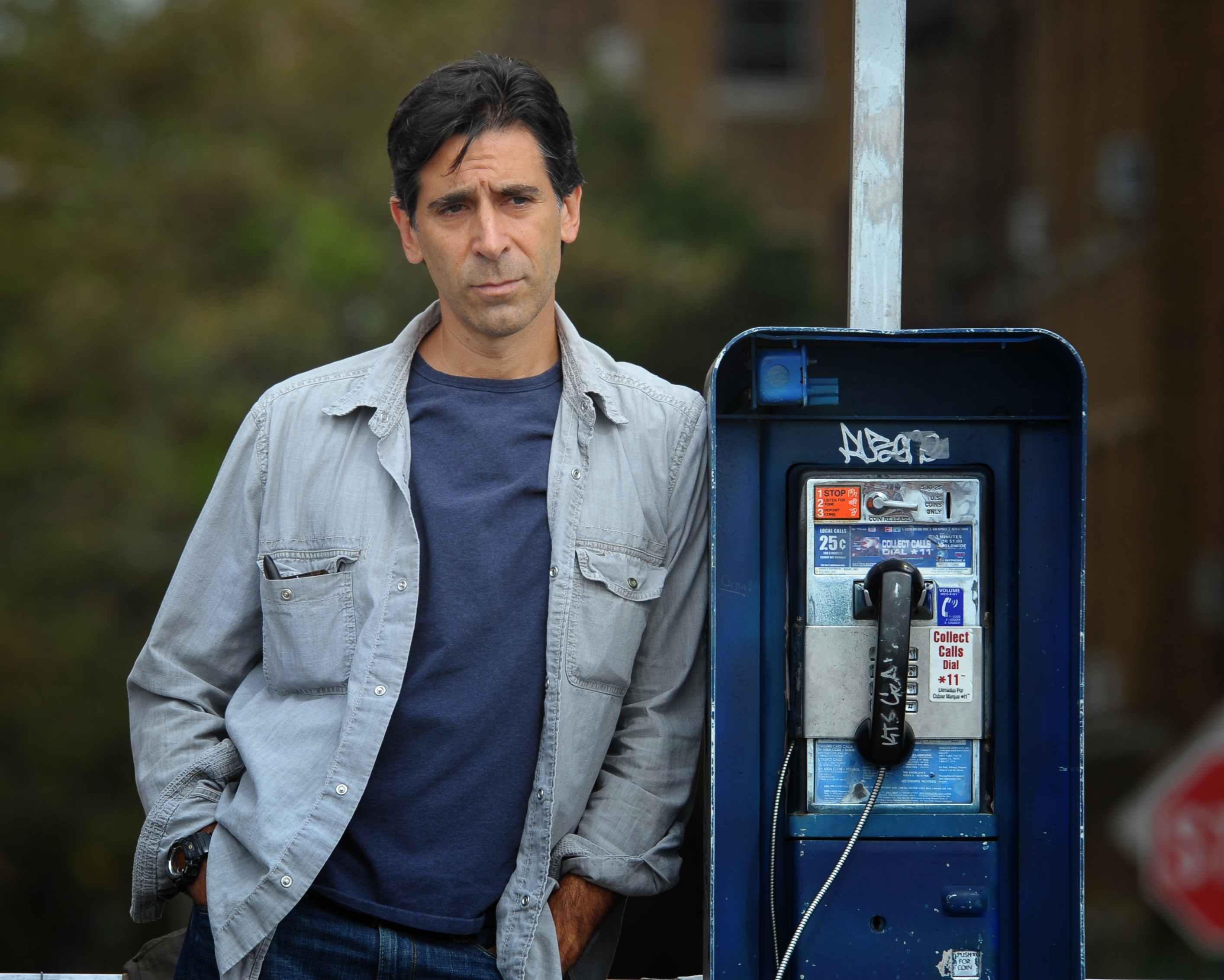
- Born: 7 June 1963 (age 63); Padua, Italy
- Education: University of Padua
- Occupations: Screenwriter, producer

Alessandro Camon (born 7 June 1963) is an Academy Award nominated screenwriter and film producer.

== Life and career ==
Born in Padua, Italy, he currently lives in Los Angeles. Camon is a graduate of the University of Padua, School of Philosophy, and received a masters in film from UCLA in Los Angeles.

Camon wrote The Messenger with writer/director Oren Moverman. The film won the Silver Bear for best screenplay and the Peace Film Award at the Berlin International Film Festival, as well as the Grand Prize and the International Critics Prize at the Deauville Film Festival. It was nominated in the Best Original Screenplay and Best Supporting Actor categories by the Academy of Motion Picture Arts and Sciences.

Camon's producing credits include The Cooler, Thank You For Smoking, Owning Mahowny Bad Lieutenant: Port of Call New Orleans and Wall Street 2: Money Never Sleeps.

Camon started his career in Italy as a film critic. He has written several books and articles on film, both in Italian and English. His stage play Time Alone, dealing with solitary confinement, grief, and forgiveness, premiered in Los Angeles in September 2017, with Tonya Pinkins and Alex Hernandez playing the two leads. It received the award for outstanding new play from the Los Angeles Drama Critics Circle. Camon's second play, Scintilla, which premiered in April 2023, is about a wildfire in contemporary California, and a group of people facing the hard decision whether to evacuate or shelter in place.

Camon also wrote the screenplay for The Listener, directed by Steve Buscemi, and starring Tessa Thompson. The film, which chronicles the night shift of a helpline operator, was selected for the Venice Film Festival "Giornate degli Autori", and the Tribeca Film Festival.

Camon is the son of novelist Ferdinando Camon and newspaper columnist Gabriella Imperatori and is married to film producer Suzanne Warren (The Last King of Scotland, Hacksaw Ridge).
